= Rick James discography =

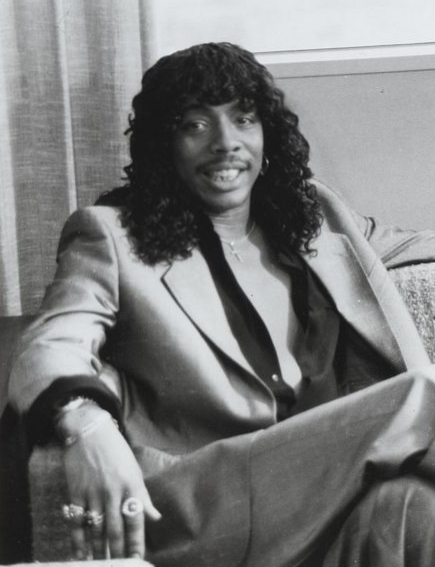
Rick James in 1984

This is the discography documenting albums and singles released by American funk/R&B singer/musician Rick James.

== Albums ==
=== Studio albums ===
Year	Album	Chart positions								Certifications	Record label
Year	Album	US	US R&B	AUS	CAN	NLD	NZ	SWE	UK	Certifications	Record label
1978	Come Get It!	13	3	—	35	—	—	—	—	RIAA: Gold	Gordy
1979	Bustin' Out of L Seven	16	2	—	16	—	—	—	—		Gordy
1979	Fire It Up	34	5	—	—	—	—	—	—		Gordy
1980	Garden of Love	83	17	—	—	—	—	—	—		Gordy
1981	Street Songs	3	1	76	24	19	13	—	—	RIAA: Platinum	Gordy
1982	Throwin' Down	13	2	—	32	41	16	—	93	RIAA: Gold	Gordy
1983	Cold Blooded	16	1	—	67	—	—	48	—	RIAA: Gold	Gordy
1985	Glow	50	7	—	89	36	—	—	—		Gordy
1986	The Flag	95	16	—	—	—	—	—	—		Gordy
1988	Wonderful	148	12	—	—	—	—	—	—		Reprise
1989	Kickin'	—	—	—	—	—	—	—	—		Reprise
1997	Urban Rapsody	170	31	—	—	—	—	—	—		Private I
2007	Deeper Still	185	19	—	—	—	—	—	—		Stone City
"—" denotes the album failed to chart or was not certified

=== Compilation albums ===
Year	Album	Chart positions			Record label
Year	Album	US	US R&B	CAN	Record label
1984	Reflections	41	10	96	Gordy
1994	Bustin' Out: The Best of Rick James	—	—	—	Motown
1997	Ultimate Collection	—	—	—	Motown
2000	The Millennium Collection: The Best of Rick James	—	—	—	Motown
2002	Anthology	—	—	—	Motown
2004	Greatest Hits	—	—	—	Motown
2005	Gold	—	—	—	Motown
2005	The Millennium Collection: The Best of Rick James, Vol. 2	—	—	—	Motown
2006	The Definitive Collection	—	—	—	Motown
2014	The Complete Motown Albums	—	—	—	Motown
"—" denotes the album failed to chart

=== Albums credited to The Stone City Band ===
Year	Album	Chart positions		Record label
Year	Album	US	US R&B	Record label
1980	In 'N' Out	122	30	Gordy
1981	The Boys Are Back	—	53	Gordy
1983	Out from the Shadow	—	56	Gordy
"—" denotes the album failed to chart

=== Albums recorded as sideman ===
- Bruce Palmer – The Cycle Is Complete (1970) (vocals and percussion)

== Singles ==
Year	Single	Chart positions							Certifications	Album
Year	Single	US	US R&B	US Dance	AUS	NLD	NZ	UK	Certifications	Album
1974	"My Mama"	—	—	—	—	—	—	—		Non-album singles
1976	"Get Up and Dance"	—	—	—	—	—	—	—		Non-album singles
1978	"You and I"	13	1	3	—	—	—	46		Come Get It!
1978	"Mary Jane"	41	3	—	—	—	—	—		Come Get It!
1978	"Hollywood"	—	—	—	—	—	—	—		Come Get It!
1979	"High on Your Love Suite"	72	12	—	—	—	—	—		Bustin' Out of L Seven
1979	"Bustin' Out"	71	8	—	—	—	—	—		Bustin' Out of L Seven
1979	"Fool on the Street"	—	35	—	—	—	—	—		Bustin' Out of L Seven
1979	"Love Gun"	—	13	32	—	—	—	—		Fire It Up
1980	"Come into My Life (Part 1)"	—	26	—	—	—	—	—		Fire It Up
1980	"Big Time"	—	17	38	—	—	—	41		Garden of Love
1980	"Summer Love"	—	—	—	—	—	—	—		Garden of Love
1981	"Give It to Me Baby"	40	1	1	—	—	—	47		Street Songs
1981	"Super Freak"	16	3	1	26	3	4	—	RIAA: Gold; BPI: Platinum	Street Songs
1981	"Ghetto Life"	102	38	1	—	—	—	—		Street Songs
1981	"Fire and Desire"	—	—	—	—	—	—	—		Street Songs
1982	"Standing on the Top (Part 1)" (with The Temptations)	66	6	—	—	—	—	53		Throwin' Down
1982	"Dance wit' Me (Part 1)"	64	3	7	—	48	—	53		Throwin' Down
1982	"Hard to Get"	—	15	—	—	—	—	—		Throwin' Down
1982	"She Blew My Mind (69 Times)"	—	62	—	—	—	—	—		Throwin' Down
1982	"Teardrops"	—	—	—	—	—	—	—		Throwin' Down
1982	"Throwdown"	—	—	—	—	—	—	—		Throwin' Down
1983	"Cold Blooded"	40	1	17	—	—	—	93		Cold Blooded
1983	"U Bring the Freak Out"	101	16	—	—	—	—	—		Cold Blooded
1983	"Ebony Eyes" (with Smokey Robinson)	43	22	—	—	—	—	96		Cold Blooded
1984	"17"	36	6	—	—	—	—	76		Reflections
1984	"You Turn Me On"	—	31	—	—	—	—	89		Reflections
1985	"Can't Stop"	50	10	9	—	—	—	—		Glow
1985	"Glow"	106	5	1	—	9	—	80		Glow
1985	"Spend the Night with Me"	—	41	—	—	—	—	—		Glow
1986	"Sweet and Sexy Thing"	—	6	4	—	—	—	—		The Flag
1986	"Forever and a Day"	—	—	—	—	—	—	—		The Flag
1988	"Loosey's Rap" (featuring Roxanne Shanté)	—	1	25	—	29	—	80		Wonderful
1988	"Wonderful"	—	50	—	—	—	—	—		Wonderful
1988	"Sexual Luv Affair"	—	—	—	—	—	—	—		Wonderful
1989	"This Magic Moment"/"Dance with Me" (medley)	—	74	—	—	—	—	—		Rock, Rhythm & Blues
1997	"Player's Way" (featuring Snoop Dogg & Bobby Womack)	—	—	—	—	—	—	—		Urban Rapsody
1997	"Turn It Out"	—	—	—	—	—	—	—		Urban Rapsody
2004	"On the Run" (with Bump J)	—	62	—	—	—	—	—		Non-album single
2006	"In the Ghetto" (with Busta Rhymes)	—	50	—	—	—	—	—		The Big Bang
"—" denotes the single failed to chart

== Writing and production discography ==
=== Albums ===
Year	Artist	Album details	Peak chart positions						Certifications	Notes
Year	Artist	Album details	US	US R&B	CAN	NZ	AUS	UK	Certifications	Notes
1979	Teena Marie	Wild And Peaceful: Release date: 1979; Label: Gordy	94	18	—	—	—	—		Rick James produced and wrote all the songs on the album
1982	Bobby Militello	Rick James Presents Bobby M – Blow: Release date: 1982; Label: Gordy	—	—	—	—	—	—		
1983	Mary Jane Girls	Mary Jane Girls: Release date: 1983; Label: Gordy	56	6	—	—	—	51	RIAA: Gold	Rick James produced and wrote all the songs on the album
1985	Mary Jane Girls	Only Four You: Release date: 1985; Label: Gordy	18	5	67	28	—	—	RIAA: Gold	Rick James produced and wrote all the songs on the album
1985	Val Young	Seduction: Release date: 1985; Label: Gordy	—	—	—	—	—	—		
1985	Eddie Murphy	How Could It Be: Release date: 1985; Label: CBS	26	17	—	—	—	—	RIAA: Gold	Rick James produced and wrote two songs on the album
2014 (recorded 1986)	Mary Jane Girls	Conversation: Release date: 2014; Label: Gordy	—	—	—	—	—	—		Rick James produced and wrote all the songs on the album
"—" denotes releases that did not chart

=== Singles ===
Year	Artist	Title	Peak chart positions										Certification	Album	Notes
Year	Artist	Title	US	US R&B	US Dan	AUS	BEL	CAN	IRE	NLD	NZ	UK	Certification	Album	Notes
1983	Mary Jane Girls	"Candy Man"	101	23	8	—	—	—	—	—	—	60		Mary Jane Girls	Rick James wrote and produced all these songs
1983	Mary Jane Girls	"All Night Long"	101	11	8	—	—	—	18	—	—	13		Mary Jane Girls	Rick James wrote and produced all these songs
1983	Mary Jane Girls	"Boys"	102	29	8	—	—	—	—	—	—	74		Mary Jane Girls	Rick James wrote and produced all these songs
1984	Mary Jane Girls	"Jealousy"	106	84	—	—	—	—	—	—	—	—		Mary Jane Girls	Rick James wrote and produced all these songs
1985	Mary Jane Girls	"In My House"	7	3	1	19	8	6	—	6	6	77		Only Four You	Rick James wrote and produced all these songs
1985	Mary Jane Girls	"Wild and Crazy Love"	42	10	3	—	26	—	—	—	—	—		Only Four You	Rick James wrote and produced all these songs
1985	Mary Jane Girls	"Break It Up"	—	79	33	—	—	—	—	—	—	—		Only Four You	Rick James wrote and produced all these songs
1985	Eddie Murphy	"Party All the Time"	2	8	19	21	—	—	—	—	3	87	US: Platinum	How Could It Be	Rick James wrote and produced all these songs
1985	Eddie Murphy	"How Could It Be" (with Crystal Blake)	—	63	—	—	—	—	—	—	—	—		How Could It Be	Rick James wrote and produced all these songs
1986	Mary Jane Girls	"Walk Like a Man"	41	91	—	—	26	97	—	—	49	—		Conversation	Rick James wrote and produced all these songs
"—" denotes a recording that did not chart or was not released in that territory.

== Videography ==
=== Video albums ===
Title	Album details
The Best of Rick James	Released: 2005; Label: Motown; Format: DVD
Rick James at Rockpalast	Released: 2005; Label: Studio Hamburg; Format: DVD
I'm Rick James - The Definitive DVD	Released: 2009; Label: Universal Music DVD Video; Format: DVD

=== Music videos ===
Year	Title	Album
1980	"Give It to Me Baby"	Street Songs
1981	"Super Freak"	Street Songs
1982	"Hard to Get"	Throwin' Down
1982	"She Blew My Mind (69 Times)"	Throwin' Down
1982	"Throwdown"	Throwin' Down
1983	"Ebony Eyes" (with Smokey Robinson) (original and edited versions)	Cold Blooded
1985	"Glow"	Glow
1988	"Loosey's Rap" (with Roxanne Shanté)	Wonderful
1988	"Wonderful"	Wonderful
1989	"This Magic Moment"/"Dance with Me" (medley)	Rock, Rhythm & Blues

=== Collaborations in music videos ===
Year	Title	Other Performer	Album
1982	"Standing on the Top"	The Temptations	Reunion
1985	"Party All the Time"	Eddie Murphy	How Could It Be
2006	"In the Ghetto"	Busta Rhymes	The Big Bang
