= Reflections (Rick James album) =

Compilation album by Rick James
- Released: 1984
- Recorded: 1977–1984
- Label: Gordy
- Producer: Rick James

Rick James chronology
Cold Blooded (1983)	Reflections (1984)	Glow (1985)

Reflections is a compilation of Rick James songs released in 1984. It also contains three until then unreleased tracks: "17", "Oh What a Night (4 Luv)", "You Turn Me On" and also contained a double sided poster. It was released on the Gordy Records imprint of Motown Records.

== Track listing ==
Side A
No.	Title	Length
1.	"17"	6:40
2.	"Oh What a Night (4 Luv)"	5:07
3.	"You Turn Me On"	4:44
4.	"Fire and Desire"	5:30

Side B
No.	Title	Length
1.	"Bustin' Out (On Funk)"	3:55
2.	"You and I"	3:38
3.	"Mary Jane"	3:58
4.	"Dance Wit' Me"	4:04
5.	"Give It to Me Baby"	4:09
6.	"Super Freak"	3:24
