= Reunion (The Temptations album) =

Studio album by The Temptations
- Released: April 7, 1982
- Recorded: 1982
- Genre: R&B, Soul, Funk
- Length: 45:37
- Label: Gordy
- Producer: Berry Gordy, Rick James, Smokey Robinson, Barrett Strong, Iris Gordy

The Temptations chronology
The Temptations (1981)	Reunion (1982)	Surface Thrills (1983)

Professional ratings
Review scores
Source	Rating
AllMusic	3/5 stars
The Rolling Stone Album Guide	3.5/5 stars

Reunion is a 1982 album by The Temptations for Gordy Records. The album was released during the 1982 Temptations Reunion tour, which reunited David Ruffin and Eddie Kendricks with the Temptations after a decade-long absence. The album also features then-current Temptations Dennis Edwards, Glenn Leonard, Richard Street, and founding members Otis Williams and Melvin Franklin. Reunion featured the single "Standing on the Top", produced by and featuring Motown funk star Rick James, who had used the Temptations as the background vocalists for his 1981 hit "Super Freak". It was their first album to reach the top 40 since Wings of Love (1976).

The Reunion tour, which began in March 1982, was only partially successful. Ruffin, by then a full-blown cocaine addict, missed several shows, causing the group to be fined thousands of dollars for each performance he missed, and Eddie Kendricks' falsetto voice had weakened due to constant smoking. Group leader Otis Williams decided that the reunion would not be a permanent thing, and fired Ruffin and Kendricks in November 1982.

== Critical reception ==
Andrew Hamilton of Allmusic, in a 3/5 star review wrote, "Reunion is a very good Temptations album that could have been great...Not a bad album, but the product doesn't equal the sum of the voices and producers."

== Track listing ==
Side one
No.	Title	Writer(s)	Lead vocalist(s)	Length
1.	"Standing on the Top (arranged by Rick James)"	Rick James	Edwards, Ruffin, Kendricks, Street, Leonard, Franklin, James	9:48
2.	"You Better Beware (arranged by Rudy Robinson, Curtis Nolen and Raymond Crossley)"	Barrett Strong	Ruffin, Franklin, Leonard	5:00
3.	"Lock It in the Pocket (arranged by Benjamin Wright, William Bickelhaupt and Kerry Gordy)"	Kerry Gordy, Benny Medina	Edwards, Leonard, Franklin	4:30

Side two
No.	Title	Writer(s)	Lead vocalist(s)	Length
4.	"I've Never Been to Me (arranged by Daniel Kane, Ken Hirsch and Ron Miller)"	Ron Miller, Ken Hirsch	Edwards	5:57
5.	"Backstage (arranged by Paul Riser)"	Smokey Robinson	Edwards, Street	4:31
6.	"More On the Inside (arranged by Paul Riser)"	Robinson	Edwards	3:49
7.	"Money's Hard to Get (arranged by Benjamin Wright, Kerry Gordy and William Bickelhaupt)"	K. Gordy, Medina	Edwards	4:44

CD issue bonus tracks
No.	Title	Writer(s)	Lead vocalist(s)	Length
8.	"Like a Diamond in the Sky"	Robinson	Edwards	3:06
9.	"Don't Hold it In"	Angelo Bond, Berry Gordy, Jr., Melvin Ragin (arranged by Melvin Ragin)	Ruffin, Edwards, Kendricks	4:12

== Personnel ==
Performers

- Dennis Edwards – vocals (lead baritenor)
- Melvin Franklin – vocals (bass)
- Eddie Kendricks – vocals (first tenor)
- Glenn Leonard – vocals (first tenor)
- David Ruffin – vocals (baritenor)
- Richard Street – vocals (second tenor)
- Otis Williams – vocals (baritone)
- Rick James – guest vocals, producer
- Mary Jane Girls – background vocals ("Standing on the Top")

Musicians

- Oscar Alston, Freddie Washington, Jervonny Collier, Nathan Watts, Eddie Watkins – bass guitar
- Paulinho da Costa, Gary Coleman, Nathan Hughes – percussion
- Bill Elliott – electric piano, synthesizer
- Kerry Ashby, Rudy Robinson, Erskine Williams, Clarence McDonald – keyboards
- Bobby Nunn, Levi Ruffin – synthesizer
- Ken Hirsch – piano
- Chris Powell – saxophone
- Ken Scott, LaMorris Payne – trumpets
- Benjamin Wright – synthesizer, arranger
- Leon "Ndugu" Chancler, Ed Greene, Jerry Jones, Lanise Hughes, Quentin Dennard – drums
- Robert Bowles, Bruce Nazarian, Dennis Herring, Louis Russell, Wah Wah Watson, Tom McDermott – guitars

== Production ==
- Executive Producer: Berry Gordy
- Tracks 3, 7 and 9 produced by Berry Gordy; track 9 co-produced by Melvin Ragin. Recording and mix by Barney Perkins, Bob Robitalle, Bobby Brooks, Fred Law, Glen Jordan, Jane Clark, Russ Terrana.
- Track 1 produced by Rick James. Recording and mix by Tom Flye, Ann Fry and Michael Johnson.
- Track 2 produced by Iris Gordy and Barrett Strong. Recording and mix by Warren Woods.
- Track 4 produced by Ron Miller. Recording and mix by Barney Perkins, Bob Robitalle, Russ Terrana, Fred Law, Kevin Sorrells, Michael Johnson.
- Tracks 5, 6 and 8 produced by Smokey Robinson. Recording and mix by Howard Wolen and Louis Russell.

== Charts ==
Year	Album	Chart positions	
Year	Album	US	US R&B
1982	Reunion	37	2

=== Singles ===
Year	Single	Chart positions			
Year	Single	US	US R&B	US AC	UK
1982	"Standing On the Top – Pt. 1" (featuring Rick James)	66	6	—	53
1982	"More On the Inside"	—	82	—	—
"—" denotes releases that did not chart
