= Deeper Still (album) =

Studio album by Rick James
- Released: May 15, 2007
- Recorded: 2003−2004
- Genre: Funk, soul
- Length: 52:20
- Label: Stone City Records
- Producer: Rick James

Rick James chronology
Urban Rapsody (1997)	Deeper Still (2007)

Deeper Still is the thirteenth and final album by American funk singer Rick James. It was released on May 15, 2007, by Stone City Records, three years after James' death.

The album peaked at No. 195 on the Billboard 200 and No. 19 on the Billboard Top R&B/Hip-Hop Albums chart in June 2007.

== Critical reception ==
Professional ratings
Review scores
Source	Rating
Allmusic	3.5/5 stars

In his review on Allmusic, Alex Henderson states that the album "doesn't contain a lot of hard, aggressive, in-your-face funk of the "Super Freak"/"Love Gun" variety, but rather, is funky in a smoother, more polished and refined way à la 1980s underrated Garden of Love." He goes onto to comment that "while soul/funk/urban is Deeper Still's primary direction, James incorporates jazz on 'Sapphire' and successfully moves into rock/pop territory on 'Maybe'." Concluding that "Deeper Still is not among James' essential releases, but hardcore fans can take comfort in knowing that it is a respectable and dignified swan song from the influential funkster.

Detrel Howell on SoulTracks states that the album "is a strong posthumous release that, in its diversity and in James' strong, sincere delivery, reminds us of the broad talent that Rick James possessed and why, years after his commercial peak, he was still an artist of importance."

Billboard considers that "rather than rely on the tried-and-true formula that brought fame and misfortune, James channels an introspective muse while expanding his musical purview." It goes onto to state "Overall the album reveals a still rich voiced singer and a talented songwriter who was determined to mount another comeback."

Keith Murphy in his review in Vibe states "This is far from the gritty hardcore funk of 1981s Street Songs (Motown) that made James famous. It's a curiously mild exit for such a furious singer."

== Track listing ==
All tracks composed by Rick James, except where noted.

1. "Deeper Still" (Rick James, Daniel LeMelle)
2. "Guinnevere" (David Crosby)
3. "Stop It" (Bryan Loren, David Stark III, Doug Grisby, James)
4. "Taste" (Loren, Stark III, Grisby, James)
5. "Stroke"
6. "Do You Wanna Play"
7. "Not Alone" (Barry Shepherd)
8. "Sapphire"
9. "Maybe"
10. "Secrets"
11. "Funk Wit Me" (James, Ron Spearman)

== Charts ==
Chart (2007)	Peak position
U.S. Billboard 200	185
U.S. Billboard Top R&B/Hip-Hop Albums	19
