= Glos (disambiguation) =

Glos is a commune in the Calvados département, Basse-Normandie region of France.

Glos may also refer to:

- Glös, an American indie rock band
- Gloucestershire, an English county
- Michael Glos (born 1944), German politician

== See also ==
- GLO (disambiguation)
- Głos (disambiguation)
