= Art Stewart (producer) =

American songwriter

- Occupations: Audio engineer, record producer, song writer
- Years active: 1960s - ?

Art Stewart is an American record producer, audio engineer, and composer who has worked on many Motown recordings. He worked on the Blue album by Diana Ross, and recordings by Teena Marie, including her Wild and Peaceful album, released in 1979. With Marvin Gaye, he has worked on the Let's Get It On album and Gaye's single "Got to Give It Up". He has also worked with Rick James on his Motown debut album Come Get It!, and his second Motown album, Bustin' Out of L Seven.

== Background ==
Stewart has been a staff engineer for Motown Records and had worked on sessions with Marvin Gaye and Diana Ross. His work as a producer appears on the Motown Grammy Rhythm & Blues Performances Of The 1960s & 1970s various artists compilation album. He is also a songwriter and has composed songs for the group Platypus, which appear on the Cherry album, released on Casablanca Records in 1980. He worked on the mixing of the Has Arrived album for The Whole Darn Family, a group that featured Tyrone Thomas. In 1977, he was rated No 45 in a list of 100 pop producers by Billboard magazine in the December 1977 issue.

Due to the thinning out of the staff of Motown, a downsizing plan, and after having been an engineer with the record label, Stewart later was working at a television station in the video production department.

He is also the president of music publishing company Famosonda Music / A. Stewart Publications which in the 1990s was located at Canoga Park, California, which has been a publisher for recordings by the Eboni Band, Jack Ashford, and Platypus.

== Producer ==
=== Rick James ===
After hearing "Got To Give It Up" by Marvin Gaye and knowing that the session was produced by Stewart, Rick James was interested in him. As a producer, James found him to be modest and easy going, and with his work in the studio, he saw a flair that he had not seen before. James said that with the subtle suggestions that he made for the positioning of the horns or changes to the bass line, he was just the man he needed. He co-produced Rick James's 1978 Come and Get It which was released in April 1978. According to James, Suzanne de Passe said that he couldn't have made a better choice to use Stewart. Jet Magazine credits Stewart with helping to put together the album that gave James overnight success. He reunited with James and co-produced Bustin' Out of L Seven, as well as the single "Bustin' Out" which was released in 1979. He had also worked on James's other single "Spacey Love".

=== Marvin Gaye ===
Stewart had a working relationship with Marvin Gaye for nearly a decade. According to Michael Eric Dyson, in his book Mercy, Mercy Me: The Art, Loves and Demons of Marvin Gaye, Stewart had worked on some of Gaye's finest recordings. He had a significant influence on the "Bobby Scott sessions" with Gaye. He was the producer and engineer on "Got To Give It Up" by Marvin Gaye. With the percussion which was played by Jack Ashford, Stewart managed to make a coke bottle sound like a cowbell by rolling off the highs.

=== Other ===
During the 1970s, one of the artists he co-produced for was Jack Ashford. he co-produced Ashfords Hotel Sheet album which was released in 1977 on the Magic Disc label. Other productions include the single for Jimmy Sterling, "Let's Do It", which was released in 1981 on Americom Records. He had previously produced "At Least I Tried" for Sterling. After Sterling left Americom Records, Stewart got him in the studio to record Marvin Gaye's "Got To Give It Up". He produced the Lil' Suzy album by eight-man group, Ozone. The album which was released on Motown in 1982 also featured Mel Carter and Syreeta Wright on a couple of tracks. He was engineer and producer on the Connections album by The Charades, which was released in 2010.

== Compositions, production (selective) ==
Compositions
| Song | Artist | Release | Year | Notes # |
|---|---|---|---|---|
| "Get Right On Top (Cause I Need Someone)" | Jack Ashford | Hotel Sheet (album) | 1977 | Co-written with Jack Ashford |
| "Bustin' Out" | Rick James | Love Gun (single) | 1979 | Co-written with Rick James |
| "Color Blind" | Platypus | Cherry (album) | 1980 | Co-written with Henry A. Hayes |
| "Comin' After Your Love" | Ozone | Li'l Suzy (album) | 1982 | Co-written with David L. Stewart, Anthony Haynes, Tracy Greathouse |
| "You'll Never Know How Much (I Love You)" | Ozone | Li'l Suzy (album) | 1982 | Co-written with Mel Carter |
| " Li'l Suzy " | Ozone | Li'l Suzy (album) | 1982 | Co-written with Ozone |
| "Shake It Down" | Ozone | Li'l Suzy (album) | 1982 | Co-written with David L. Stewart, Gregg Middleton |
| "Shake It Down" | Eboni Band | Shake It Down / Get Together (single) | | Sole composer |
| "Get Together" | Eboni Band | Shake It Down / Get Together (single) | | Sole composer |

Production
| Song | Artist | Release | Year | Notes # |
|---|---|---|---|---|
| "Got To Give It Up" Pt.1 | Marvin Gaye | "Got To Give It Up" Pt.1 / "Got To Give It Up" Pt.2 (single) | 1977 | |
| "Got To Give It Up" Pt.2 | Marvin Gaye | "Got To Give It Up" Pt.1 / "Got To Give It Up" Pt.2 (single) | 1977 | |
| 'You And I" | Rick James | "You And I" / "Hollywood" (single) | 1978 | |
| "Hollywood" | Rick James | "You And I" / "Hollywood" (single) | 1978 | |
| "Mary Jane" | Rick James | "Mary Jane" / "Dream Maker" (single) | 1978 | |
| "Dream Maker" | Rick James | "Mary Jane" / "Dream Maker" (single) | 1978 | |
| "High On Your Love Suite" | Rick James | "High On Your Love Suite" / "Stone City Band, Hi!" (single) | 1979 | |
| "Stone City Band, Hi!" | Rick James | "High On Your Love Suite" / "Stone City Band, Hi!" (single) | 1979 | |
| "Bustin' Out" | Rick James | "Bustin' Out" / "Sexy Lady" (single) | 1979 | |
| "Sexy Lady" | Rick James | "Bustin' Out" / "Sexy Lady" (single) | 1979 | |
| "Fool On The Street" | Rick James | "Fool On The Street" / "Jefferson Ball" (single) | 1979 | Co-produced with Rick James |
| "Jefferson Ball" | Rick James | "Fool On The Street" / "Jefferson Ball" (single) | 1979 | Co-produced with Rick James |
| "I'm A Sucker For Your Love" | Teena Marie | "I'm A Sucker For Your Love" / "De Ja Vu" (I've Been Here Before) (single) | 1979 | Co-produced with Rick James |
| "De Ja Vu" (I've Been Here Before) | Teena Marie | "I'm A Sucker For Your Love" / "De Ja Vu" (I've Been Here Before) (single) | 1979 | Co-produced with Rick James |
| "Don't Look Back" | Teena Marie | "Don't Look Back" / "I'm Gonna Have My Cake" (And Eat It Too) (single) | 1979 | Co-produced with Rick James |
| "I'm Gonna Have My Cake" (And Eat It Too) | Teena Marie | "Don't Look Back" / "I'm Gonna Have My Cake" (And Eat It Too) (single) | 1979 | Co-produced with Rick James |
| "Appreciate Your Love" | Platypus | "Appreciate Your Love" (mono) / "Appreciate Your Love" (stereo) (single) | 1980 | |
| "Li'l Suzy" | Ozone | "Li'l Suzy" / "I'm Not Easy" (single) | 1982 | Co-produced with Ozone |
| "I'm Not Easy" | Ozone | "Li'l Suzy" / "I'm Not Easy" (single) | 1982 | Co-produced with Ozone |
| "Rock House" | Sir Arthur | "Rock House" / "Rock House" (single) | 1988 | |
| "Shake It Down" | Eboni Band | "Shake It Down" / "Get Together" (single) | | |
| "Get Together" | Eboni Band | "Shake It Down" / "Get Together" (single) | | |

== Engineer ==
In the early 1970s Stewart worked on the Lady Sings The Blues album Diana Ross, and the Chameleon album by Frankie Valli & the Four Seasons, both released in 1972. Stewart handled the engineering and remixing chores for the soundtrack album to the 1974 Fred Williamson film Hell Up in Harlem by Edwin Starr. In the late 1970s, he recorded Bonnie Pointer's Bonnie Pointer album which was released on Motown M7-911R1 in 1978. In the 1980s, he worked on the Leon Ware produced Shadow album, Shadows In The Streets, which was released in 1981.
