= Uglow =

Uglow is a surname. Notable people with the surname include:

- George Uglow Pope (1820–1908), Christian missionary to Tamil Nadu, translator of Tamil texts into English
- Alan Uglow (1941–2011), English-born abstract painter
- Euan Uglow (1932–2000), British painter
- Jenny Uglow OBE (born 1947), British biographer, critic and publisher
- Nikita Uglow (born 1993), Russian sprinter
- William James Uglow Woolcock (1878–1947), Liberal Party politician in England

== See also ==
- Glow (disambiguation)
- Hugh Low
