= Dance wit' Me =

Single by Rick James

from the album Throwin' Down
- B-side: "Dance Wit' Me (Part 2)"
- Released: April 22, 1982
- Genre: Synth-funk, post-disco
- Length: 7:16 (album version); 4:16 (single version)
- Label: Gordy
- Songwriter(s): Rick James
- Producer(s): Rick James

Rick James singles chronology
"Standing on the Top" (1982)	"Dance wit' Me" (1982)	"Hard to Get" (1982)

"Dance wit' Me" is a song by American singer Rick James. It is the opening track on James' 1982 album Throwin' Down.

== Background ==
The song features Roy Ayers playing a vibes solo on the song.

== Chart performance ==
Released as the second single from Throwin' Down, it peaked at number three on the Billboard R&B Singles chart, and number sixty-four on the Hot 100. On the US dance chart, "Dance wit' Me" peaked at number seven.
