= Glow =

Glow or GLOW may refer to:

== In science and technology ==
=== In computing and telecommunications ===
- Glow (JavaScript library), an open-source JavaScript library created by the BBC
- Glow (Scottish Schools National Intranet), a telecommunications project in Scotland
- Glow (company), Israeli cybersecurity company

=== In linguistics ===
- GLOW (linguistics society), a linguistics society in Europe

=== In physics ===
- Incandescence, the emission of electromagnetic radiation from a hot object
- Luminescence, any form of light emission not resulting from heat
- List of light sources

=== Other uses in science and technology ===
- Glow or Bloom (shader effect), computer graphics effect
- GLOW (gross lift-off weight), see maximum takeoff weight

== In arts and entertainment ==
=== In film and television ===
- The Glow (film), a 2002 TV film starring Portia de Rossi
- Glow (2000 film), a film starring Frankie Ingrassia
- Glow (2011 film), a film starring Tony Lo Bianco
- The Glow (TV series), a 2000s television series starring Dean Cain
- GLOW TV, a syndicated televised version of the Gorgeous Ladies of Wrestling events from 1986 to 1990 with 104 episodes
- GLOW: The Story of the Gorgeous Ladies of Wrestling, a 2012 documentary about the 1980s TV show
- GLOW (TV series), a 2017 comedy-drama series based on the Gorgeous Ladies of Wrestling

=== In music ===
==== Albums ====
- Glow (Al Jarreau album), 1976
- Glow (Brett Eldredge album), 2016
- Glow (Andy Hunter album), 2012
- Glow (Donavon Frankenreiter album), 2010
- Glow (The Innocence Mission album), 1995
- Glow (Jackson and His Computerband album), 2013
- Glow (Joey Yung album), or the title song, 2007
- Glow (Kaki King album), 2012
- Glow (Raven album), 1994
- Glow (Reef album), 1997
- Glow (Rick James album), 1985
- Glow (Tensnake album), 2014
- The Glow (Bonnie Raitt album), 1979
- The Glow (Gold Celeste album), 2015
- The Glow (DMA's album), 2020
- The Glow Pt. 2, by The Microphones, 2001

==== Songs ====
- "Glow" (Alien Ant Farm song), 2003
- "Glow" (Drake song), 2017
- "Glow" (Ella Henderson song), 2014
- "Glow" (Jessica Mauboy song), 2021
- "Glow" (Kelly Clarkson and Chris Stapleton song), 2021
- "Glow" (Madcon song), 2010
- "Glow" (Rick James song), 1985
- "Glow" (Spandau Ballet song), 1981
- "G.L.O.W." (song), by Smashing Pumpkins, 2008
- "Glow", by Donna De Lory from In the Glow, 2003
- "Glow", by Gavin James, 2018
- "Glow", by Kelis from Tasty, 2003
- "Glow", by Kesha from Period, 2025
- "Glow", by Kylie and Garibay from Sleepwalker, 2014
- "Glow", by Kym Marsh from Standing Tall, 2003
- "Glow", by Nelly Furtado from Loose, 2006
- "Glow", by Retro Stefson, 2012
- "Glow", by Salvador Sobral from Excuse Me, 2016
- "Glow", by Stray Kids from Mixtape, 2018
- "The Glow", by the Microphones from It Was Hot, We Stayed in the Water, 2000
- "The Glow Pt. 2", by the Microphones from The Glow Pt. 2, 2001

=== Other uses in arts and entertainment ===
- Glow, a 2014 book by Ned Beauman
- glow (magazine), a Canadian beauty and health magazine
- GLOW (Gorgeous Ladies of Wrestling), wrestling promotion
- GLOW (Greenville Light Opera Works), operetta company
- Glow (video game), a game developed by Empty Clip Studios for the iPhone
- GLOW Festival Eindhoven

== Other uses ==
- GLOW (LGBT), acronym meaning gay, lesbian, or whatever
- Gay and Lesbian Organisation of the Witwatersrand, a South African LGBTQ rights organisation
- Glow by JLo, a perfume
- Glow Energy, a utility company in Thailand
- Glów, a village in southern Poland
- The Glow, a plot device from the Scott Pilgrim comics.

== See also ==
- Glo (disambiguation)
