= The Confessions of Rick James =

Book by Rick James

The Confessions of Rick James: Memoirs of a Super Freak
- Author: Rick James
- Language: English
- Genre: Memoir
- Publisher: Colossus Book
- Publication date: 2007

The Confessions of Rick James: Memoirs of a Super Freak is a book that funk musician Rick James was working on, before his death on 6 August 2004. The book was published in 2007 by Colossus Books. David Ritz, who had been employed by James to work on the book with him, later said that this version did not truly reflect how the musician wanted it published. In 2014, Ritz published his own re-edited version entitled Glow: The Autobiography of Rick James.
