= Shadow (group) =

Funk and soul band

- Years active: 1979–1981
- Label: Elektra
- Spinoff of: Ohio Players
- Past members: James "Diamond" Williams; William "Billy" Beck; Clarence "Chet" Willis

Shadow was a music group in the funk-soul genre that was a spin-off from the Ohio Players. They released three albums on the Elektra label. They were Love Lite in 1979, Shadow in 1980, and Shadows in the Street in 1981. They also released a number of singles over the period from 1979 to 1981. There seems to be a degree of mystery as to who the actual members of the group were.

== Background ==
The group was made up by three former members of the Ohio Players. They appeared to deliberately disguise their identity. On one of their performances in 1980, they were playing in the shadows which added to their somewhat secretive image portrayal. They were probably made up of James "Diamond" Williams on drums, William "Billy" Beck on keyboards, and guitarist Chet Willis. Those were the main members. Other musicians that played on the recordings were, Daniel Zazurus on keyboards, Kenneth Williams on drums. Others were Robert Bryant, Garnett Brown, Ernie Fields, Delbert Taylor, Azar Lawrence, and Fred Wesley. In spite of the mystery surrounding the make up of the group, two members of the group were pictured in an October, 1981 issue of Billboard chatting in a studio with John Deacon, bassist for Queen and sound engineer Art Stewart.

== Album releases ==
In 1979, they released the album Love Lite on Electra 6E-233. It was produced by Kenneth Williams, Willie Beck, Clarence Willis and Don Mizell. The credited musicians on the album were Daniel Lazarus on keyboards, Kenneth Williams on drums and percussion, Clarence Willis on vocals, guitars and bass. On horns were Robert Bryant Snr, Garnett Brown, Ernie Fields Jnr, Delbert Taylor, Azar Lawrence and Fred Wesley. The string section was made up of Bill Henderson and his Strings, Don Palmer, Janise Gower, Jerome Webster, Sid Page and Pam Gates. Willie Beck, Clarence Willis, and James Williams were the credited composers.

Their second album Shadow was released in 1980 on Elektra 6E-293. It featured "I Can't Keep Holding Back (My Love)" which was written by Linda Clay and "Beyond the Finish Line". The single off the album, "Mystery Dancer" was released in July 1980.

Their third album Shadows in the Street was released in 1981 on Elektra 6E-345. Most of the lead vocals were sung by Willis. The album included "Born to Hustle", "Best Lady" and Piece of Cake", and "Clouds". The single from the album was "Party in the Streets". The album was produced by Leon Ware and the engineer was Art Stewart.

== Discography ==
=== Albums ===
Title	Label and cat	Year	Format	Notes
Love Lite	Elektra 6E-233	1979	LP	Produced by Don Mizell, Williams, Beck, Willis, Inc.
Shadow	Elektra 6E-293	1980	LP	Produced by Leon Ware
Shadows in the Streets	Elektra – 6E-345	1981	LP	Produced by Leon Ware

=== Singles ===
Year	Song	US R&B
1979	"I Need Love"	77
1980	"No Better Love"	72
1980	"Mystery Dancer"	68
1980	"Hot City"	75
1981	"Clouds"	—
1981	"Born to Hustle"	—
1981	"Sinister Way"	—
1981	”New Years Evil”	—
"Party in the Streets"	—	
"—" denotes releases that did not chart.

== Musicians (listed alphabetically) ==
- William "Billy" Beck - keyboards
- Garnett Brown
- Robert Bryant
- Ernie Fields
- Azar Lawrence
- Delbert Taylor
- Fred Wesley
- James "Diamond" Williams - drums
- Kenneth Williams - drums
- Clarence "Chet" Willis - guitar
- Daniel Zazurus a.k.a. Lazarus / Zarus etc. - keyboards
