= Mary Jane Girls (album) =

Studio album by Mary Jane Girls
- Released: April 13, 1983
- Recorded: 1982
- Studio: The Record Plant (Sausalito, California)
- Genre: R&B, funk, soul, post-disco
- Length: 35:50
- Label: Gordy
- Producer: Rick James

Mary Jane Girls chronology
Mary Jane Girls (1983)	Only Four You (1985)

Mary Jane Girls is the debut studio album by American girl group the Mary Jane Girls, released on April 13, 1983, by Gordy Records. It peaked at number 56 on the Billboard 200 chart.

The album was produced and written entirely by Rick James. Three singles were released and each enjoyed success on the Hot Black Singles charts: "Candy Man" (number 23 R&B), "All Night Long" (number 11 R&B), and "Boys" (number 29 R&B). All three songs charted together on the Hot Dance Club Play chart, peaking at number 8.

Professional ratings
Review scores
Source	Rating
Allmusic	3/5 stars

== Track listing ==
All songs written and composed by Rick James.

No.	Title	Length
1.	"Candy Man"	4:39
2.	"Boys"	5:34
3.	"Prove It"	4:28
4.	"Jealousy"	3:28
5.	"You Are My Heaven"	3:14
6.	"On the Inside"	3:55
7.	"All Night Long"	5:34
8.	"Musical Love"	5:07

== Personnel ==
- Joanne "Jojo" McDuffie – lead and backing vocals
- Cheryl "Cheri" Bailey aka Cheri Wells – lead and backing vocals
- Candice "Candi" Ghant – backing vocals
- Rick James – guitar, synthesizer, bass, drums, percussion, sitar, timpani
- Levi Ruffin, Jr. – synthesizer, synth strings, Fender Rhodes, backing vocals
- Greg "Bubbles" Levias – synthesizer, Fender Rhodes, organ
- Danny LeMelle – saxophone, wind controller, synth strings, percussion
- Oscar Alston – synth bass
- Tom McDermott – lead guitar
- Alan McGrier – bass
- Steve Price, Tony Nolasco – percussion
- LaMorris Payne – backing vocals

== Charts ==
=== Weekly charts ===
Chart (1983)	Peak position
US Billboard 200	56
US Top R&B/Hip-Hop Albums (Billboard)	6

=== Year-end charts ===
Chart (1983)	Position
US Top R&B/Hip-Hop Albums (Billboard)	22

=== Singles ===
Year	Single	Chart positions		
Year	Single	US	US R&B	US Dance
1983	"Candy Man"	—	23	8
1983	"Boys"	—	29	8
1983	"All Night Long"	—	11	8

== Samples ==
- "All Night Long" has been sampled in many songs, including "Smooth Operator" by Big Daddy Kane on his 1989 LP, It's a Big Daddy Thing, "Around the Way Girl" by LL Cool J, "Tonight's da Night" by Redman and "Mary Jane (All Night Long)" by Mary J. Blige, "Da Bitchez" by Jeru The Damaja, "Can't Wait" by Redman.
- Kylie Minogue sampled "Candy Man" in "Always Find the Time" from her hit album, Rhythm of Love.
