= Only Four You =

Studio album by Mary Jane Girls
- Released: February 14, 1985
- Recorded: 1984
- Genres: R&B; funk; soul
- Length: 35:11
- Label: Gordy
- Producer: Rick James

Mary Jane Girls chronology
Mary Jane Girls (1983)	Only Four You (1985)	Sweet Conversations (1986)

Singles from Only For You
- 1. "In My House" Released: October 30, 1984; 2. "Wild and Crazy Love" Released: 1985; 3. "Break It Up" Released: 1985

Professional ratings
Review scores
Source	Rating
Allmusic	4/5 stars

Only Four You is the second and final studio album by the American vocal girl group Mary Jane Girls, released on February 14, 1985. As with their debut album, Mary Jane Girls, the album was produced and written by Rick James.

== Background ==
It peaked at number 18 on the Billboard 200 chart. The album includes their biggest hit single, "In My House" (#7 Pop, #3 R&B, #1 Dance). Other singles included "Wild and Crazy Love" (#42 Pop, #10 R&B, #3 Dance) and "Break It Up" (#79 R&B, #33 Dance). Only Four You was certified Gold by the RIAA in June 1985. Each of the other girls was also given a chance to sing lead vocals on a track from the album, with Corvette singing lead on "Girlfriend", Candi with "I Betcha" and Maxi with "Leather Queen".

== Track listing ==
All songs written and composed by Rick James, except where noted.

No.	Title	Writer(s)	Length
1.	"In My House"		4:28
2.	"Break It Up"		4:20
3.	"Shadow Lover" (Interlude)		0:30
4.	"Shadow Lover"		4:22
5.	"Lonely for You"		4:12
6.	"Wild and Crazy Love"	Kenny Hawkins; Rick James	5:48
7.	"Girlfriend"		4:23
8.	"I Betcha"		3:50
9.	"Leather Queen"	Rick James; Danny LeMelle	3:50

== Personnel ==
- Joanne "JoJo" McDuffie – lead and backing vocals
- Candice "Candi" Ghant – lead and backing vocals
- Yvette "Corvette" Marine – lead and backing vocal
- Kimberly "Maxi" Wuletich – lead and backing vocals
- Curtis Williams – piano
- Danny LeMelle – sax, synthesizers
- Kenny Hawkins – rhythm and lead guitar, keyboards
- Tom McDermott: acoustic, electric guitars
- Rick James – guitars, sitar, keyboards, bass, drums, percussion
- Levi Ruffin – keyboards, string arrangements
- Gregg Levias – keyboards, synthesizers
- Jerry Livingston – Bass
- Jerry Rainey – drums, percussion
- Nate Hughes – percussion, cymbals
- Rick James – arranger and producer
- Bill Waldman, Bruce Kane – engineer
- Rick James, Tom Flye – mixed

== Charts ==
=== Weekly charts ===
Chart (1985)	Peak position
US Billboard 200	18
US Top R&B/Hip-Hop Albums (Billboard)	5

=== Singles ===
Year	Single	Chart positions		
Year	Single	US	US R&B	US Dance
1985	"In My House"	7	3	1
1985	"Wild and Crazy Love"	42	10	3
1985	"Break It Up"	—	79	33
