= Throwin' Down =

Studio album by Rick James
- Released: May 13, 1982
- Recorded: 1981–1982
- Studios: Record Plant (Sausalito), Motown/Hitsville U.S.A. Studios (Hollywood)
- Genres: Funk, soul, R&B
- Length: 40:43
- Label: Gordy
- Producer: Rick James

Rick James chronology
Street Songs (1981)	Throwin' Down (1982)	Cold Blooded (1983)

Singles from Throwin' Down
- 1. "Dance wit' Me" Released: April 22, 1982; 2. "Hard To Get" Released: 1982

Throwin' Down is the sixth studio album by Rick James, released in 1982 via the Gordy imprint of Motown Records. It peaked at No. 13 on the Billboard 200. Although not as popular as Street Songs, Throwin' Down is certified gold by the RIAA. It was nominated for an American Music Award for Favorite Soul/R&B Album.

== Production ==
Michael Walden, Roy Ayers, and Grace Slick appear on the album.

== Critical reception ==
Professional ratings
Review scores
Source	Rating
AllMusic	4/5 stars
Robert Christgau	B+
The Encyclopedia of Popular Music	3/5 stars
The Rolling Stone Album Guide	3.5/5 stars

Robert Christgau wrote: "Stealing his licks from G. Clinton & Co. (or maybe himself, who cares anymore?), he's the nearest thing to a pop musician in the rock and roll sense that today's black charts—not to mention today's white charts—can offer." The Washington Post wrote that "the musical settings are clumsy reworkings of Parliament's funk and the Temptations' psychedelic soul." The Boston Phoenix said that the album "is the sort of follow-up record you'd expect from a journeyman rocker who’s just stumbled into the Top 10 with a hot single. ... [It] chugs along with throwaway fun, staying just a notch below Street Songs in general utility."

== Track listing ==
All tracks composed by Rick James, except where noted.

Side A

1. "Dance wit' Me" 7:16
2. "Money Talks" 4:50
3. "Teardrops" 4:49
4. "Throwdown" 3:17

Side B

1. "Standing on the Top" (with the Temptations) 3:51
2. "Hard to Get" 4:07
3. "Happy" (with Teena Marie) 5:29
4. "She Blew My Mind (69 Times)" 4:11
5. "My Love" (James, Le Roi Johnson) 2:53

2014 digital remaster bonus tracks / 2014 Complete Motown Albums bonus tracks

10. "Standing on the Top" (Long Version) - 9:50
11. "Hard to Get" (12" Instrumental) - 4:12
12. "She Blew My Mind (69 Times)" (12" Extended Mix) - 6:30
13. "She Blew My Mind (69 Times)" (12" Instrumental) - 7:28

== Personnel ==
- Rick James – vocals, guitars, bass guitar, harmonica, keyboards, synthesizers, Linn Drum programming, percussion
- Daniel LeMelle – flute, saxophone, trumpet, string synthesizers, backing vocals
- Levi Ruffin, Jr. – electric and acoustic piano, synthesizers, backing vocals
- John McFee, Tom McDermott – guitars
- Erskine Williams – piano
- Oscar Alston – bass guitar, backing vocals
- Lanise Hughes, Narada Michael Walden, Paul Hines – drums, percussion
- Nate Hughes – percussion, handclaps, backing vocals
- Roy Ayers, Donny Keider – vibraphone
- Teena Marie – duet lead vocals on "Happy"
- Grace Slick, Jean Carn, Julia Tillman Waters, Lawrence Hilton-Jacobs, Maxine Willard Waters, Patti Brooks, Tabby Johnson, Diane Nixon, Jeri Fields – backing vocals
- Moses Johnson, JoAnne McDuffe, Lisa Sarna – handclaps, backing vocals
- Aaron Dublin, "Bi"g John Main, "Jennifer", Ronald Byrd – handclaps
- Karat Faye – engineer, Record Plant L.A.

== Certifications ==
Region	Certification	Certified units/sales
United States (RIAA)	Gold	500,000^{^}
^{^} Shipments figures based on certification alone.
