= HAL Awards =

American annual awards ceremony

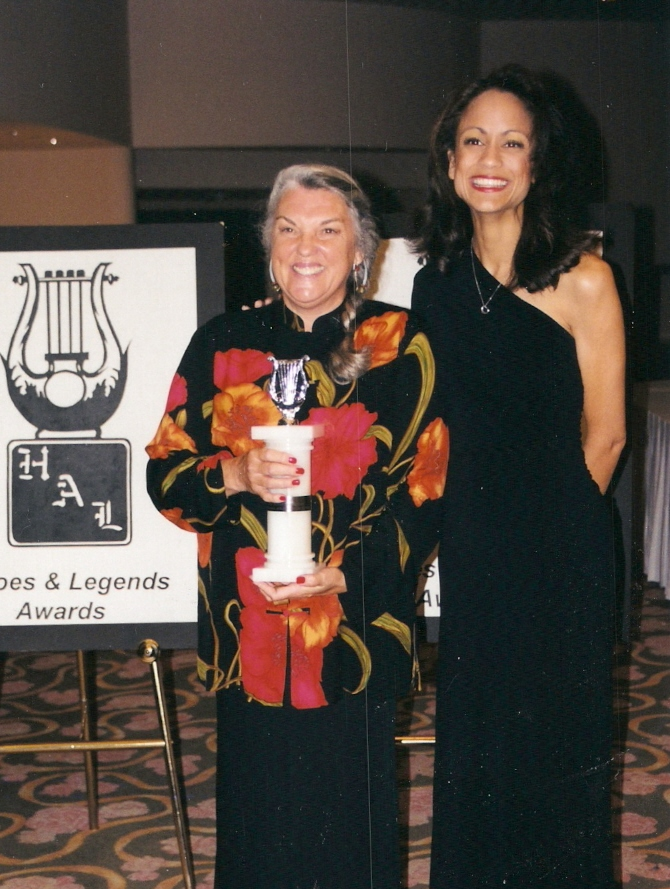
Honoree Tyne Daly and presenter Anne Marie Johnson at 2001 HAL Awards

The Tribute to Heroes and Legends Awards (HAL) is an annual awards ceremony, established to honor entertainers, sports figures and business executives who have not only achieved success in their areas of expertise, but have utilized their celebrity status to benefit the community, via charitable activities and community service. The awards ceremony began in 1990, and the first event was held on September 23, 1990, at the Hollywood Roosevelt Hotel in Los Angeles. Initial honorees included actors, Marla Gibbs, Jo Marie Payton and Zsa Zsa Gabor; recording artists Nancy Wilson and M.C. Trouble and executives from Chrysler, CBS, GM and the Laker Organization.

== History ==
The HAL Awards were created by celebrated songwriter, and Motown Alumna, Janie Bradford. The event raises money for the HAL Scholarship Fund, which provides funding for performing arts students. One of the organization’s most celebrated scholarship recipient is electronic musician and rapper, Flying Lotus, who has released four albums on Warp Records. Each year, scholarship funds are presented to talented students who have maintained at least a 2.0 grade average and who show promise in the area of performing arts. The scholarship provides the financial assistance these students need to continue their education. The students are honored at the star-studded Hollywood event.

The nine awards that HAL bestows each year include Outstanding Achievement in Music, Theatre and TV/Film, The Icon Award, Legacy Award, Pioneer Award, Cornerstone Award, Pacesetter Award and The Unsung Hero Award. Recipients have included: The Temptations, Smokey Robinson, Isley Brothers, The Whispers, The Originals (band), Thelma Houston, Chaka Khan, Diana Ross and The Supremes, The Four Tops, Wesley Snipes, Tyne Daly, Reginald Veljohnson, Craig T. Nelson, Toni Basil, Della Reese, Roger Mosley, Regina King, Tyrese Gibson, Ernie Hudson, George Clinton. Notable presenters include Vivica A. Fox, Tom Selleck, David Cassidy, Quincy Jones, Gladys Knight, James Avery, Billy Vera, Ray Parker, Jr., Mel Carter and Berry Gordy. In 2014, New Edition, Eddie Floyd and the Mary Jane Girls were added to the list. The organization also honors songwriters, like Harold Lilly, who wrote Alicia Keys's "You Don't Know My Name" and the legendary team of Holland-Dozier-Holland, who wrote numerous Motown hits. Producers, such as Clarence Avant, and Gamble & Huff are also honored as well as influential entertainment industry executives, such as BMI's Thomas Cain, Universal's Jim Urie, Jon Platt and new Motown president, Ethiopia Habtemarian. The 2015 event featured tributes to El DeBarge, Bobby Brown, The Dramatics, featuring LJ Reynolds, Dennis Edwards, jazz stylist Barbara Morrison, Brenda Holloway, 90's chart toppers Tony, Toni, Tone and Universal Records executive, Andy Skurow.

Actress Jo Marie Payton has hosted the event since 1991.

== Associated Events ==
Each year a series of additional events are scheduled leading up to the Awards Dinner and Show. Those events include a Welcome Reception for the honorees and presenters; a Celebrity Breakfast giving fans an opportunity to meet the honorees and purchase autographed items; and the Legends of Soul Concert, featuring R&B artists from the 60’s and 70’s, such as Brenda Holloway, Gene Chandler, Brenton Wood and Al B. Sure.
