= GLO =

Glo or GLO may refer to:

== Science ==
- 3267 Glo, an asteroid
- Gulonolactone oxidase

== Transport ==
- GLO Airlines, a defunct American airline
- Glossop railway station, England
- Gloucestershire Airport, England
- Gol Transportes Aéreos

== Other uses ==
- Glo (album), by the band Delirious?
- Glo (band), a Canadian band
- Glo, Kentucky
- Galambu language
- United States General Land Office, a former US agency
- glo, a heated tobacco product from British American Tobacco
- Globacom, a Nigerian telecommunications company
- Group litigation order, in England and Wales
- Kobo Glo, an e-reader
- Greek letter organizations, fraternities and sororities on colleges and Universities
- Nickname of TV Globo, known in Portuguese as Glô
- Lhoba people, an ethnic group in southeastern Tibet
- Texas General Land Office, a state agency
- Billboard Global 200, a chart with the shortcut "GLO"
- Glo (company), the second largest network operator in Nigeria

== See also ==
- Glow (disambiguation)
