= Ghetto Life (song) =

Song by Rick James

- German 12-inch single cover

Single by Rick James

from the album Street Songs
- B-side: "Below the Funk (Pass the J)"
- Released: 1981
- Genre: Funk
- Length: 3:52 (7-inch single version); 4:20 (album & 12-inch version)
- Label: Gordy
- Songwriter: Rick James
- Producer: Rick James

Rick James singles chronology
"Super Freak" (1981)	"Ghetto Life" (1981)	"Standing on the Top (Part 1)" (1982)

"Ghetto Life" is a song written by Rick James that was first released on his 1981 album Street Songs and was later released as the third single from the album.

== Lyrics and music ==
The lyrics of "Ghetto Life" reflect James' youth in Buffalo, New York. According to cultural historian Craig Werner, after many factories in Buffalo closed at the time "there was no hope of making any kind of a living. So you could see the hustling culture developing at the time. And Rick catches that beautifully." A poignant line in the song describes how the ghetto persists: "One thing 'bout the ghetto, you don't have to hurry/it'll be there tomorrow, so brother don't you worry."

The music represents the "Punk funk" dance music sound that James popularized. The music incorporates fuzz tone guitars, horns, handclaps, and backing vocals by the Temptations, who also provided backing vocals on James' single "Super Freak."

== Reception ==
"Ghetto Life" received praise from critics but not as much success on the charts. It only reached #102 on Billboard's popular music charts. It performed better on the Hot Soul Singles chart, peaking at #38. A medley with "Give It to Me Baby" and "Super Freak" did reach #1 on the Dance Club Songs chart.

Allmusic critic Alex Henderson described "Ghetto Life" as an "arresting hit." Fellow Allmusic critic Andrew Hamilton described it as "an underrated song with so much going on musically you can't grab it all in one bite" and claimed its lack of chart success was "downright embarrassing." uDiscoverMusic critic Charles Waring agreed that "Ghetto Life"'s chart performance "didn’t reflect the song’s quality." New York Times writer Jonathan Lethem wrote that "here's where the promise of punk-funk is kept" and that with its "ragged, furious guitars, blended with Rick's ragged, furious voice and ragged, furious lyrics...genuine pride and defiance are impossible to mistake." OPS staff writer Krista Summitt praised the "steady soulful beat and excellent rhythm guitar work."

"Ghetto Life" was included on several Rick James compilation albums, including Bustin' Out: The Very Best of Rick James and Ultimate Collection.

== "In the Ghetto" ==
In 2006 Busta Rhymes sampled "Ghetto Life" for his song "In the Ghetto" utilizing vocals James recorded. "In the Ghetto" reached #50 on the Hot R&B/Hip-Hop chart.
