= All Night Long (Mary Jane Girls song) =

1983 single by Mary Jane Girls

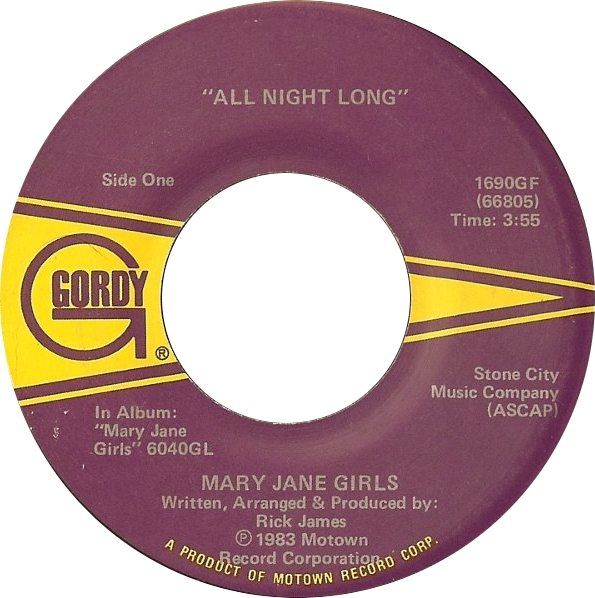
- A-side label of US vinyl single

Single by Mary Jane Girls

from the album Mary Jane Girls
- Released: February 6, 1983
- Recorded: 1982
- Studio: Record Plant (Sausalito, California)
- Genre: R&B; funk; soul; post-disco
- Length: 5:34 (album version); 3:55 (single version)
- Label: Gordy
- Songwriter(s): Rick James
- Producer(s): Rick James

Mary Jane Girls singles chronology
"Candy Man" (1983)	"All Night Long" (1983)	"Boys" (1983)

Audio
- All Night Long - Mary Jane Girls" on YouTube

"All Night Long" is a song written, arranged, and produced by American musician Rick James for the Mary Jane Girls.

In the US, the song enjoyed success on the Hot Black Singles Chart, peaking at No. 11; on the Dance Chart it peaked at No. 8. But it failed to succeed with the general public, peaking at No. 101 (Billboard Bubbling Under). It is their only major hit on the UK Singles Chart, peaking at No. 13.

The song has been heavily sampled by other artists. Billboard ranked the song No. 61 on their list of the 100 Greatest Girl Group Songs of All Time.

== Charts ==
Chart performance for "All Night Long"
Chart (1983)	Peak position
Ireland (IRMA)	18
UK Singles (OCC)	13
US Hot R&B/Hip-Hop Songs (Billboard)	11
