= Bustin' Out of L Seven =

Studio album by Rick James
- Released: January 16, 1979
- Recorded: 1978
- Studio: Sigma Sound, New York City; Magic Wand, Hollywood, California
- Genre: R&B
- Length: 40:16
- Label: Gordy
- Producer: Rick James, Art Stewart

Rick James chronology
Come Get It! (1978)	Bustin' Out of L Seven (1979)	Fire It Up (1979)

Singles from Bustin' Out of L Seven
- 1. "Bustin' Out (On Funk)" Released: January 12, 1979; 2. "Fool on the Street" Released: 1979

Professional ratings
Review scores
Source	Rating
AllMusic	4/5 stars
MusicHound Rock: The Essential Album Guide	3.5/5 stars
The Rolling Stone Album Guide	2.5/5 stars
The Village Voice	B−

Bustin' Out of L Seven is the second album by the American musician Rick James, released in 1979 through Gordy Records. Included on the album is the top ten R&B hit, "Bustin' Out (On Funk)". L7 is slang for "square", as in the opening lyrics of "Bustin' Out (On Funk)", "Well, alright, you squares, it's time you smoked, Fire up this funk and let's have a toke". The letter L and the number 7 form a square.

== Track listing ==
All tracks composed by Rick James.

Side A

1. "Bustin' Out" - 5:24
2. "High on Your Love Suite/One Mo Hit (Of Your Love)" - 7:24
3. "Love Interlude" - 1:57
4. "Spacey Love" - 5:50

Side B

1. "Cop N Blow" - 5:04
2. "Jefferson Ball" - 7:21
3. "Fool on the Street" - 7:20

2014 digital remaster bonus track

7. "Bustin' Out (12" Extended Mix) - 7:21

2014 Complete Motown Albums bonus tracks

8. "Bustin' Out (12" Extended Mix) - 7:21
9. "Bustin' Out (12" Instrumental) - 5:24

== Personnel ==
- Rick James - vocals, guitar, bass, keyboards, percussion
- Oscar Alston - bass
- Levi Ruffin - synthesizer, percussion
- Wally Ali - guitar on "Cop 'N' Blow"
- Ernie Fields Jr. - saxophone
- Michael Brecker - saxophone
- Randy Brecker - trumpet
- Fred Jackson Jr. - alto saxophone, alto flute
- Al Szymanski - guitar
- Lanise Hughes - drums, percussion
- Lorenzo Shaw - drums, percussion
- Shondra Akiem - percussion
- Maxine Willard Waters - background vocals
- Clydene Jackson - background vocals
- Fernando Harkness - tenor saxophone on "High on Your Love Suite" and "Fool on the Street"
- Garnett Brown - trombone
- Dorothy Ashby - harp on "Spacey Love" and "Jefferson Ball"
- Clarence Sims - keyboards, percussion
- Wayne Jackson - trumpet on "Spacey Love" and "Fool on the Street"
- Jackie Ruffin - percussion
- Oscar Brashear - trombone
- George Bohanon - trombone
- Teena Marie - background vocals
- Billy Nunn, Bobby Nunn - keyboards, Freddie Rappilo - guitar, Richard Shaw - bass, Lorenzo Shaw - drums on "High on Your Love Suite"
- Julia Tillman Waters - background vocals
- Bobby Nunn, Billy Nunn, Sascha Meeks, Richard Shaw, Jackie Ruffin - background vocals on "High on Your Love Suite"

== Charts ==
=== Album ===
Year	Chart positions	
Year	US	US R&B
1979	16	2

=== Singles ===
Year	Single	Chart positions		
Year	Single	US	US R&B	US Dance
1979	"Bustin' Out (On Funk)"	71	8	—
1979	"Fool on the Street"	—	35	—
