= Fire It Up (Rick James album) =

Studio album by Rick James
- Released: October 16, 1979
- Recorded: 1979
- Studio: The Record Plant, Sausalito, CA
- Genre: Funk, punk funk, funk rock
- Length: 37:00
- Label: Gordy
- Producer: Rick James

Rick James chronology
Bustin' Out of L Seven (1979)	Fire It Up (1979)	Garden of Love (1980)

Fire It Up is the third studio album by American musician Rick James. It was released on October 16, 1979, on the Motown sub-label Gordy Records. The first single was "Love Gun". The album has sold under a million copies, according to Rolling Stone.

== Critical reception ==
Professional ratings
Review scores
Source	Rating
AllMusic	2.5/5 stars
The Rolling Stone Album Guide	2.5/5 stars
The Virgin Encyclopedia of R&B and Soul	3/5 stars

The Bay State Banner wrote that "James' vocal style remains functional, and the punk-funk horn section average... His strength is in his torrid compositions and captivating presentation." The San Bernardino County Sun noted that James relishes "loud, rowdy hand-clapping funk straight from the street." Newsday determined that "when James sticks with unadulterated hard stuff ... he is among the most crackerjack practitioners of funk rock."

The Rolling Stone Album Guide deemed the album "secondhand Bootsy Collins."

== Track listing ==
All tracks composed by Rick James.

Side A

1. "Fire It Up" – 3:59
2. "Love Gun" – 5:44
3. "Lovin You Is a Pleasure" – 4:08
4. "Love in the Night" – 6:22

Side B

1. "Come into My Life" – 7:10
2. "Stormy Love" – 2:05
3. "When Love Is Gone" – 7:32

2010 Bonus Track / 2014 digital remaster bonus track / 2014 Complete Motown Albums bonus track

8. "Love Gun" (Promotional 12-Inch version) – 10:46

== Personnel ==
- Rick James – vocals, acoustic guitar, piano, organ, Harpsichord, timbales, timpani (tympani), electronic drums [syndrums], drums, percussion

The Stone City Band

- Levi Ruffin – synthesizer, synthesizer (strings ensemble), percussion, backing vocals
- Tom McDermott – six- and twelve-string acoustic and electric guitars
- Greg Levias – keyboards, Fender Rhodes electric piano
- Danny LeMelle – alto and tenor saxophone, flute, harpsichord
- Lanise Hughes – drums
- Lorenzo Shaw — drums
- Oscar Alston – bass guitar
- Shondu Akiem – electronic drums (syndrums), percussion
- Cliff Ervin – trumpet, flugelhorn
- John Ervin – trombone
- Julia Waters, Maxine Waters, Pat Henderson, Jackie Ruffin, Lisa Sarna – backing vocals
- California St. Clair, Cynthia Gable, Cynthia Nettles, Danny LeMelle, Jackie Ruffin, Julia Waters, Keith "Star" Ragin, Lisa Sarna, Maxine Waters, Pat Henderson, Tom McDermott, Winston L. Allen - choir on "Love in the Night"
- John Cabalka - art direction
- Ron Slenzak - photography

== Charts ==
Year	Album	Chart positions	
Year	Album	US	US R&B
1979	Fire It Up	34	5

=== Singles ===
Year	Single	Chart positions		
Year	Single	US	US R&B	US Dance
1979	"Love Gun"	—	13	—
1980	"Love Gun"	—	—	32
