= Urban Rapsody =

Studio album by Rick James
- Released: October 14, 1997
- Genre: Funk
- Length: 72:28
- Label: Private-I/Mercury/PolyGram
- Producer: Rick James, Daniel LeMelle

Rick James chronology
Kickin' (1989)	Urban Rapsody (1997)	Deeper Still (2007)

Urban Rapsody is the twelfth studio album by the American funk singer Rick James. It was released through Mercury Records and Private-I Records in 1997, and was the final album released in his lifetime. The album combines rap and funk.

Urban Rapsody received a Parental Advisory sticker, James's only album with one. It was his first release since 1988's Wonderful, due to substance abuse problems and an extended period of incarceration.

The album peaked at No. 170 on the Billboard charts.

== Critical reception ==
Professional ratings
Review scores
Source	Rating
AllMusic	3/5 stars
The Encyclopedia of Popular Music	3/5 stars
Entertainment Weekly	B−

(The New) Rolling Stone Album Guide gave the album 1.5 stars (out of 5), writing that it is a "cannily conservative attempt to recapture the R&B portion of his audience, but it lacks the fire of his early hits."

== Track listing ==
All tracks composed by Rick James, except where noted.

1. "Urban Rapsody" (James, LeMelle, Rappin' 4-Tay)
2. "West Coast Thing" (James, Shepherd)
3. "Somebody's Watching You" (James, Shepherd)
4. "Back in You Again"
5. "Turn It Out"
6. "Good Ol' Days"
7. "Player's Way" (James, Snoop Doggy Dogg, Shepherd)
8. "Never Say You Love Me"
9. "It's Time" (James, Shepherd, Neb Love)
10. "So Soft So Wet" (James, Shepherd)
11. "Bring On the Love"
12. "Mama's Eyes" (James, Shepherd)
13. "Soul Sista"
14. "Favorite Flava" (James, Shepherd, Neb Love)
15. "Urban Rapsody (Reprise)" (James, LeMelle)
