= Glo (band) =

Canadian rock band

- Origin: Montreal, Quebec, Canada
- Genres: Alternative rock
- Years active: 2001–present
- Labels: GloMusicGroup
- Members: Rick Cordi; Eddie Mazzola; Patrick Rowan

Glo is a Canadian alternative rock band from Montreal, Quebec formed in 2001. They consist of Riccardo "Rick" Cordi (vocals, guitars), Eddie Mazzola (guitar, bass, keyboards), and Patrick Rowan (drums).

== Career ==
Their self-titled debut included the single "Wither", which appeared on the soundtrack for the TV series Higher Ground. Soon after the release of Glo, they were invited to perform at NXNE in Toronto, Ontario, Canada and the ‘In the City’ music festival in Manchester, England.

After taking a brief hiatus, Glo released their follow-up Off to the Races Vol. 1, in early 2007. On the Outside was released in 2010 through the GloMusicGroup. While the album was completed in 2009, the band was dissatisfied with the production and turned to veteran producer Paul Lani. The albums first single, "Move Along", stayed on the Canadian Active Rock charts for 12 weeks, peaking at number 41.

The band returned to the studio in 2012 and collaborated with producer John Nathaniel. The result was an EP called "No One Hears Me". The EP resulted in their second nomination for "Best Out of Province Artist" at the 2012 Toronto Independent Music Awards. Off to the Races Vol. 1 was named Best Provincial Rock EP and the single "Off to the Races" was named Best Provincial Rock Song in the 2007 Toronto Exclusive Magazine Awards.

The songs "Dopamine" and "Drown in Me" were featured on the soundtrack to the motion picture The Power of Attorney.
