= The Flag (album) =

Studio album by Rick James
- Released: 1986
- Recorded: 1985−1986
- Label: Gordy
- Producer: Rick James

Rick James chronology
Glow (1985)	The Flag (1986)	Wonderful (1988)

The Flag is the ninth studio album by Rick James, released in 1986. It was his last album on the Gordy Records imprint of Motown Records. James considered The Flag to be a political album.

The album peaked at No. 95 on the Billboard Top 200.

== Critical reception ==
Professional ratings
Review scores
Source	Rating
AllMusic	2/5 stars
Robert Christgau	C+
The Encyclopedia of Popular Music	2/5 stars
The Rolling Stone Album Guide	1.5/5 stars

People wrote that James's "strong, supple voice and superb arranging talents are wasted." The Los Angeles Times wrote that the album "is meant to be a return to the hard-core funk sound that established James, and while it’s a step in the right direction, it doesn’t stomp hard enough."

== Track listing ==
All tracks composed by Rick James.

1. "Freak Flag"
2. "Forever and a Day"
3. "Sweet and Sexy Thing"
4. "Free to Be Me"
5. "Save It for Me"
6. "Freak Flag"
7. "R U Experienced"
8. "Funk in America / Silly Little Man"
9. "Slow and Easy (Interlude)"
10. "Slow and Easy"
11. "Om Raga"
12. "Painted Pictures"
13. "Freak Flag"

2014 digital remaster bonus tracks

14. "Sweet and Sexy Thing (12" Extended Mix)" - 9:06
15. "Forever and a Day (12" Extended Mix)" - 7:37

2014 Complete Motown Albums bonus tracks

14. "Sweet and Sexy Thing (12" Extended Mix)" - 9:06
15. "Sweet and Sexy Thing (12" Instrumental)" - 8:08
16. "Sweet and Sexy Thing (12" Version)" - 7:41
17. "Forever and a Day (12" Extended Mix)" - 7:37
18. "Forever and a Day (Instrumental)" - 7:34
