= Come Get It! =

Studio album by Rick James
- Released: April 20, 1978
- Recorded: 1977–1978
- Studio: Cross-Eyed Bear, Clarence, New York and Record Plant, New York, NY
- Genre: Funk; soul
- Length: 38:56
- Label: Gordy
- Producer: Rick James, Art Stewart

Rick James chronology
Come Get It! (1978)	Bustin' Out of L Seven (1979)

Singles from Come Get It!
- 1. "You and I" Released: March 1978; 2. "Mary Jane" Released: September 9, 1978; 3. "Hollywood" Released: December 15, 1978

Come Get It! is the debut album by Rick James and the Stone City Band. It was released in April 1978 via the Motown sub-label Gordy Records. The singles "You and I" and "Mary Jane" propelled Come Get It! to gold status.

== Critical reception ==
Professional ratings
Review scores
Source	Rating
AllMusic	4/5 stars
The Encyclopedia of Popular Music	3/5 stars
The Rolling Stone Album Guide	3/5 stars

Rolling Stone, in a retrospective, praised "You and I", writing that "James unleashed his brash 'punk-funk' movement with this gloriously strutting single, which boasted a colossal synth-bass groove, James' boa-tossing vocal panache and double-entendres directed at his ex-wife."

== Track listing ==
All tracks composed and arranged by Rick James

Side A

1. "Stone City Band, Hi!" – 3:30
2. "You and I" – 8:04
3. "Sexy Lady" – 3:52
4. "Dream Maker" – 5:16

Side B

1. "Be My Lady" – 4:48
2. "Mary Jane" – 4:57
3. "Hollywood" – 7:27
4. "Stone City Band, Bye!" – 1:10

2014 digital remaster bonus track

9. "You and I" (Extended M+M Mix) – 9:55

2014 Complete Motown Albums bonus tracks

10. "You and I" (Extended M+M Mix) – 9:55
11. "You and I" (Extended M+M Instrumental) – 9:13

== Personnel ==
- Rick James – vocals, guitars, keyboards, synthesizers, bass
- Levi Ruffin, Jr. - Keyboards
- Billy Nunn – keyboards
- Bobby Nunn – keyboards
- Freddy Rapillo – guitar
- Andy Rapillo – bass
- Mike Caputy – drums
- Randy and Mike Brecker – horns
- Richard Shaw – bass
- Lorenzo Shaw – drums
- Flick, Berry, Steve Williams – horns
- Levi Ruffin – background vocals
- Jackie Ruffin – background vocals
- Bobby Nunn – background vocals
- Billy Nunn – background vocals
- Sascha Meeks – background vocals
- Richard Shaw – background vocals
- Vanessa Brooks Nunn – background vocals
- Joey Diggs – background vocals
- Anthony Caesar – background vocals
- Roger Brown – background vocals
- Calvin Moore – background vocals
- Bennie McCullough – background vocals
- Chuck Madden, Shelly – engineers

== Charts ==
=== Weekly charts ===
Chart (1978)	Peak position
US Billboard 200	13
US Top R&B/Hip-Hop Albums (Billboard)	3

=== Year-end charts ===
Chart (1978)	Position
US Billboard 200	83
US Top R&B/Hip-Hop Albums (Billboard)	24

=== Singles ===
Year	Single	Chart positions		
Year	Single	US	US R&B	US Dance
1978	"You and I"	13	1	3
1978	"Mary Jane"	41	3	—

== Certifications ==
Region	Certification	Certified units/sales
United States (RIAA)	Gold	500,000^{^}
^{^} Shipments figures based on certification alone.
