= Wonderful (Rick James album) =

Studio album by Rick James
- Released: July 5, 1988
- Recorded: 1987–88
- Length: 52:21
- Label: Reprise
- Producer: Rick James

Rick James chronology
| The Flag (1986) | Wonderful (1988) | Kickin' (1989) |

Wonderful is the tenth studio album by American musician Rick James, released in 1988 via Reprise Records. It includes the hit song "Loosey's Rap", which topped the US R&B Charts.

The album peaked at No. 148 on the Billboard 200.

== Production ==
James wrote and produced the album.

== Critical reception ==
Professional ratings
Review scores
| Source | Rating |
|---|---|
| AllMusic | 1.5/5 stars |
| Robert Christgau | C+ |
| The Encyclopedia of Popular Music | 2/5 stars |
| Los Angeles Times | 3/4 stars |
| Orlando Sentinel | 3/5 stars |
| The Philadelphia Inquirer | 1/4 stars |
| The Rolling Stone Album Guide | 2.5/5 stars |

The Orlando Sentinel wrote that "despite the dumb lyrics, Wonderful sports some great dance-party music." The Los Angeles Times praised "Loosey's Rap", writing that featured rapper Roxanne Shanté is "tougher than a truckload of leather-wearing Mary Jane Girls, and her B-girl boasting—which she sounds fully capable of backing up—makes her a formidable foil for James and his sly, teasing innuendoes."

== Track listing ==
All tracks composed by Rick James.

1. "Wonderful" – 4:19
2. "Judy" – 4:58
3. "Loosey's Rap" (duet with Roxanne Shanté) – 3:54
4. "So Tight" – 4:28
5. "Sexual Luv Affair" – 5:13
6. "Love's Fire" – 4:43
7. "I Believe in U" – 5:53
8. "In the Girls' Room" – 4:41
9. "Hypnotize" – 4:19
10. "Sherry Baby" – 4:43
11. "Hot Summer Nights" (duet with Chrissi Scinta) – 5:10

Note

- Track 11 available on CD only.

== Personnel ==
Adapted from the album's liner notes.

- Rick James – lead vocals, backing vocals, bass guitar, drums, percussion, keyboards

Stone City Band:

- Levi Ruffin, Jr. – strings, synthesizer, backing vocals
- Tom McDermott – lead guitar
- William Echols – bass guitar
- Gregory Treadwell – keyboards, strings
- Kenny Hawkins – guitar
- Val Young – backing vocals
- Jackie Ruffin – backing vocals

Other musicians

- Roxanne Shanté – rapping (track 3)
- Chrissi Scinta – vocals (track 11)

Production

- Produced and arranged by Rick James
- Mixing engineers: Rick James, Bruce Kane and Levi Ruffin, Jr.
- Assistant engineer: Michael Nally
- Recorded and mixed at The Joint Studios, Buffalo, New York
- Mastered at Sterling Sound, New York by Jack Skinner
- Album coordinators: Levi Ruffin, Jr and Ann Mabin
- Art direction and design: Mary Ann "My Thang" Dibs
- Cover concept: Rick James
- Photography: Caroline Greyshock, Stuart Watson
- Executive producer: Benny Medina
