= Głos =

Głos (Polish: voice) may refer to:

- Głos (1886–1905), a social, literary and political weekly review published in Warsaw
- Głos (1991), a socio-political weekly magazine headed by Antoni Macierewicz
- Głos (Czech Republic) (formerly Głos Ludu), a daily newspaper of the Polish minority in the Czech Republic
- Głos – Tygodnik Nowohucki, a weekly magazine founded in 1957, published in Kraków
