= The Scintas =

The Scintas were a music and comedy variety group.

The group began in 1977 as The Scinta Brothers, consisting of Frankie and Joey Scinta, brothers from Buffalo, New York. They got a job performing at the chain of Playboy Clubs, including a stint at the Playboy Hotel and Casino in Atlantic City in 1981. Their younger sister, Chrissi Scinta, joined later. Drummer Pete O'Donnell was added to the group around 1987. In the late 1980s, after Frankie overcame a cocaine addiction, the Scintas became prominent supporters of the "Just Say No" anti-drug campaign.

The group toured throughout the eastern United States for many years. They were particularly popular in Akron, Ohio, where they performed regularly at the Tangier cabaret.

In 2000, the Scintas moved to Las Vegas and began performing at casinos, with resident shows at the Las Vegas Hilton, Rio, Sahara, The D, and Plaza casinos through the years.

Chrissi retired from the group in 2013 because of throat hemorrhaging. She was replaced first by Ashlee Amoia and later by Janien Valentine. Joey Scinta died in 2017, and the group continued on without him. A year later, Frankie transitioned to performing under his own name, rather than as The Scintas, though O'Donnell continued to play a major part in the show.
