= Glow (Rick James song) =

Single by Rick James

from the album Glow
- Released: 1985
- Genre: Funk
- Length: 5:40
- Label: Gordy
- Songwriter(s): Rick James
- Producer(s): Rick James

Rick James singles chronology
"Can't Stop" (1985)	"Glow" (1985)	"Spend the Night With Me" (1985)

Music video
- "Glow" on YouTube

"Glow" is a 1985 single by Rick James from his album of the same title. The single was James' tenth release to reach the top ten on the R&B singles chart, peaking at number five. On the dance chart, the single was his second and final number one. Both James’ appearance and the song were featured in The A-Team Episode The Heart Of Rock 'N Roll (1985). The song's melody was quite similar to that of Chaka Khan's "I'm Every Woman".
