= Loosey's Rap =

Single by Rick James

from the album Wonderful
- Released: 1988
- Label: Reprise
- Songwriter: Rick James
- Producer: Rick James

Rick James singles chronology
"Sweet and Sexy Thing" (1986)	"Loosey's Rap" (1988)	"Wonderful" (1988)

"Loosey's Rap" is a 1988 song written and recorded by Rick James with a rap performed by Roxanne Shanté. The single was one of the last of Rick James's releases to make the Hot Black Singles chart, and was his first number one on that chart since 1983. "Loosey's Rap" was the last of his four number ones on the Black Singles chart, staying at the top spot for one week. The single did not make the Hot 100; it peaked at number 25 on the dance chart.
