= Kickin' =

- Cover of 2014 release

Studio album by Rick James
- Released: 1989 (promo copy); July 8, 2014 (commercial digital release)
- Recorded: 1988–1989
- Genre: Funk, R&B, Soul, Rock
- Length: 49:34
- Label: Warner Bros. Records
- Producer: Rick James (Executive Producer: Benny Medina)

Rick James chronology
Wonderful (1988)	Kickin' (1989)	Urban Rapsody (1997)

Kickin' is the eleventh Rick James album from 1989. Officially shelved at the time, the album was released as a series of promotional copies in the United Kingdom by Warner Bros. Records.

After James' death in 2004, Kickin' became available to download via torrent websites. In July 2014, in celebration of the release of his autobiography "Glow," the James' Estate released the album digitally, along with the rest of his discography.

== Track listing ==
1. "Kickin'"
2. "Day and Night"
3. "Teach Me"
4. "Black and White"
5. "Runaway Love"
6. "School You" (re-titled "School Me" for commercial release)
7. "Anything and Everything"
8. "U Got It Real Good" (re-titled "You Got It Real Bad" for commercial release)
9. "Get wit It"
10. "Rock and Roll Eyes"
