= In My House =

1984 single by Mary Jane Girls

- Standard artwork (US 7-inch vinyl pictured)

Single by Mary Jane Girls

from the album Only Four You
- Released: October 30, 1984
- Recorded: 1984
- Studio: The Joint (Buffalo, New York)
- Genre: R&B; funk; soul
- Length: 4:28 (album version)
- Label: Gordy; Motown
- Songwriter: Rick James
- Producer: Rick James

Mary Jane Girls singles chronology
| "Boys" (1983) | "In My House" (1984) | "Wild and Crazy Love" (1985) |

"In My House" is a song written and produced by American musician Rick James and recorded by his protégées, the Mary Jane Girls, for their second studio album, Only Four You (1985). It was released as the album's lead single in October 30, 1984 by Gordy Records. In the United States, the single topped the Billboard Dance/Disco Club Play chart in April 1985 and remained atop the chart for two weeks. It also reached the top 10 on both the Billboard Hot 100 and Billboard Hot Black Singles charts, peaking at number seven on the Hot 100 in June 1985 and remained in the top 40 for 12 weeks. It is the group's highest-peaking single and their only top-40 entry on the Billboard Hot 100. In 2009, VH1 ranked "In My House" at number 52 on its program 100 Greatest One Hit Wonders of the 80s.

== Controversy ==
In 1985, the Parents Music Resource Center (PMRC) was organized in the United States to draw attention to music which the group believed contained inappropriate content for children. "In My House" was chosen on the group's "Filthy Fifteen" list due to its alleged sexual innuendo. However, during the VH1 100 Greatest One Hit Wonders of the 80s program, the group went on record as saying the song is about love, not sex. The group's follow-up single, "Wild and Crazy Love", was even more suggestive in its lyrical content, but the PMRC was not known to have attacked it as openly as it condemned "In My House".

== Track listings ==
- 7-inch single

A. "In My House" – 3:59
B. "In My House" (instrumental) – 5:00

- 12-inch single

A. "In My House" (12-inch version) – 5:00
B. "In My House" (instrumental 12-inch version) – 7:16

== Charts ==
=== Weekly charts ===
Weekly chart performance for "In My House"
| Chart (1985) | Peak position |
|---|---|
| Australia (Kent Music Report) | 19 |
| Belgium (Ultratop 50 Flanders) | 6 |
| Canada Retail Singles (The Record) | 6 |
| Canada Top Singles (RPM) | 6 |
| Netherlands (Dutch Top 40) | 6 |
| Netherlands (Single Top 100) | 6 |
| New Zealand (Recorded Music NZ) | 6 |
| UK Singles (Official Charts) | 77 |
| US Billboard Hot 100 | 7 |
| US 12-inch Singles Sales (Billboard) | 1 |
| US Dance/Disco Club Play (Billboard) | 1 |
| US Hot Black Singles (Billboard) | 3 |
| US Cash Box Top 100 | 5 |
| US Top 100 Black Contemporary Singles (Cash Box) | 4 |

=== Year-end charts ===
Year-end chart performance for "In My House"
| Chart (1985) | Position |
|---|---|
| Belgium (Ultratop 50 Flanders) | 52 |
| Canada Top Singles (RPM) | 64 |
| Netherlands (Dutch Top 40) | 58 |
| Netherlands (Single Top 100) | 73 |
| US Billboard Hot 100 | 63 |
| US 12-inch Singles Sales (Billboard) | 6 |
| US Hot Black Singles (Billboard) | 6 |
| US Cash Box Top 100 | 44 |
| US Top 100 Black Contemporary Singles (Cash Box) | 10 |

== See also ==
- List of number-one dance singles of 1985 (U.S.)
