= Give It to Me Baby =

1981 single by Rick James

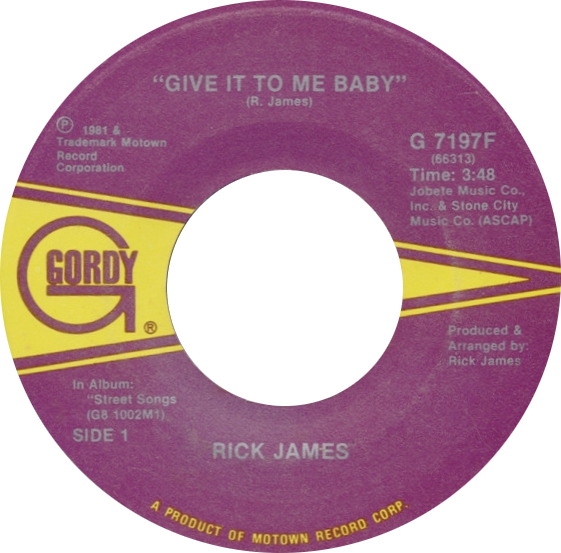
- Side A label of the US single

Single by Rick James

from the album Street Songs
- B-side: "Don't Give Up on Love"
- Released: February 20, 1981
- Recorded: 1980
- Genre: Disco; funk
- Length: 3:48 (single version); 4:07 (album version)
- Label: Gordy
- Songwriter: Rick James
- Producer: Rick James

Rick James singles chronology
"Big Time" (1980)	"Give It to Me Baby" (1981)	"Super Freak" (1981)

Music video
- "Give It to Me Baby" on YouTube

"Give It to Me Baby" is a song written by American singer Rick James. Taken from his album Street Songs, the song charted on the Billboard Hot 100, spending two weeks at No. 40 and spent five weeks at No. 1 on the R&B chart. Two other tracks from Street Songs, "Super Freak" and "Ghetto Life", topped the American dance chart for three weeks in the summer of 1981. The song proved to be even more successful with R&B and dance club audiences. Part of the background vocals were sung by Temptations member Melvin Franklin.

== Music Video ==
"Give It to Me Baby"’s accompanying video shows Rick James following Jere Fields in her house, but she refuses to be his partner until she changes into her bikini to attract James and they both swim in the pool. During the second verse, James and Fields are seen sitting in the couch at a house party as he flirts with her. In the end, both James and Fields get out of the pool and he picks her up taking them into the house.

== Charts ==
Chart (1981–1982)	Peak position
UK Singles (OCC)	47
US Billboard Hot 100	40
US Billboard Hot Soul Singles	1
US Billboard Hot Dance Club Play	1
US Cash Box Top 100	34

== See also ==
- List of Billboard number-one dance club songs
- List of number-one R&B singles of 1981 (U.S.)
