= You and I (Rick James song) =

Single by Rick James

from the album Come Get It!
- B-side: "Hollywood"
- Released: March 26, 1978
- Recorded: 1977
- Genre: Funk, R&B, disco
- Length: 8:04 (album version); 3:08 (single edit)
- Label: Gordy
- Songwriter: Rick James
- Producers: Rick James & Art Stewart

Rick James singles chronology
"You and I" (1978)	"Mary Jane" (1978)

"You and I" is the debut single by R&B/funk musician Rick James, released in 1978 from his debut album, Come Get It!. It spent two weeks at number one on the Billboard R&B charts and reached number thirteen on the Billboard Hot 100. "You and I" also peaked at number three on the disco chart.

== Personnel ==
- Rick James - vocals, keyboards, synthesizers
- Levi Ruffin, Jr. - keyboards
- Billy Nunn – keyboards
- Bobby Nunn – keyboards
- Freddie Rappilo – guitar
- Andy Rapillo – bass
- Richard Shaw – bass
- Lorenzo Shaw – drums
- Mike Caputy – drums
- Randy Jay Beckenstein (sax), Rick Bell (Trombone) and Mike Brecker – horns
- Flick (sax), Barry (trumpet), Steve Williams (trombone) - horns
- Levi and Jackie Ruffin, Bobby and Billy Nunn, Sascha Meeks, Richard Shaw, Vanessa Brooks Nunn, Joey Diggs, Anthony Ceasar, Roger Brown, Calvin Moore, Bennie McCullough - background vocals
- Art Stewart - co-producer
