= Glow (Rick James album) =

Studio album by Rick James
- Released: May 21, 1985
- Recorded: 1984−1985
- Genre: Funk; rock; pop; new wave
- Length: 42:29
- Label: Gordy
- Producer: Rick James

Rick James chronology
Reflections (1984)	Glow (1985)	The Flag (1986)

Singles from Glow
- 1. "Glow" Released: 1985; 2. "Can't Stop" Released: 1985

Professional ratings
Review scores
Source	Rating
AllMusic	4/5 stars
Robert Christgau	C
The Encyclopedia of Popular Music	2/5 stars
The Rolling Stone Album Guide	2/5 stars

Glow is the eighth studio album, and 9th overall by Rick James, released in 1985 on the Gordy Records imprint of Motown Records.

It peaked at No. 50 on the Billboard album chart.

== Critical reception ==
The Rolling Stone Album Guide wrote that James had "[run] out of ideas," describing the album as a "waste."

== Track listing ==
All tracks composed and arranged by Rick James.

Side A

1. "Can't Stop" - 6:10
2. "Spend the Night with Me" - 4:12
3. "Melody Make Me Dance" - 5:17
4. "Somebody (The Girl's Got)" - 5:11

Side B

1. "Glow" - 5:44
2. "Moonchild" - 4:22
3. "Sha La La La La (Come Back Home)" - 5:24
4. "Rock and Roll Control" - 4:39
5. "Glow (Reprise)" - 1:45

2014 digital remaster bonus tracks

Glow / Glow (Reprise) - 6:59
1. Spend the Night with Me (12" Extended Version) - 7:20
2. 17 - 6:44
3. Oh What a Night (4 Luv) - 5:05
4. You Turn Me On - 4:42

2014 Complete Motown Albums bonus tracks

10. Glow / Glow (Reprise) - 6:59
11. Glow (12" Instrumental) - 8:20
12. Spend the Night with Me (12" Extended Version) - 7:20
13. Spend the Night with Me (12" Instrumental) - 7:33
14. Can't Stop (Instrumental) - 6:13
15. 17 - 6:44
16. 17 (12" Instrumental) - 5:40
17. Oh What a Night (4 Luv) - 5:05
18. You Turn Me On - 4:42
19. You Turn Me On (12" Long Version) - 5:30
20. You Turn Me On (12" Long Version Instrumental) - 5:33

== Personnel ==
- Backing Vocals – Greg Levias, LaMorris Payne, Levi Ruffin Jr., Maxwell Karmason, Val Young
- Bass – Jerry Livingston, Rick James
- Drums – Steve Ferrone, Lanise Hughes
- Flute – Daniel LeMelle
- Guitar – Kenny Hawkins, Rick James, Tom McDermott
- Harmonica – Rick James
- Keyboards – Rick James
- Percussion – Nate Hughes, Rick James
- Piano – Greg Levias
- Saxophone – Daniel LeMelle
- Strings – Levi Ruffin Jr.
- Synthesizer – Daniel LeMelle, Greg Levias, Levi Ruffin Jr.
- Vocoder – Rick James
