= Garden of Love (album) =

Studio album by Rick James
- Released: 1980
- Recorded: 1979–1980
- Studios: Record Plant (Sausalito, CA); Criteria Studios (Miami, FL); Blank Tape Studios (New York City, NY)
- Genre: Funk
- Length: 33:50
- Label: Gordy
- Producer: Rick James

Rick James chronology
Fire It Up (1979)	Garden of Love (1980)	Street Songs (1981)

Professional ratings
Review scores
Source	Rating
AllMusic	4/5 stars
Robert Christgau	C−
The Rolling Stone Album Guide	2/5 stars

Garden of Love is the fourth studio album by the American musician Rick James, released in 1980 on Motown sub-label Gordy.

== Track listing ==
All tracks composed by Rick James; except where noted.

Side A

1. "Big Time" (James Calloway, Leroy Burgess, Sonny T. Davenport) – 6:27
2. "Don't Give up on Love" – 6:15
3. "Island Lady" – 4:07

Side B

1. "Gettin' It On (In the Sunshine)" – 3:03
2. "Summer Love" – 6:19
3. "Mary-Go-Round" – 6:59
4. "Gettin' It On (In the Sunshine) Reprise" – 0:40

2010 bonus tracks / 2014 digital remaster bonus tracks / 2014 Complete Motown Albums bonus tracks

7. "Gettin' It On (In the Sunshine)" [Reprise] – 1:36
8. "Big Time" (Extended version – Previously unreleased) – 11:40
9. "Gypsy Girl" (Unreleased demo) – 3:41

== Charts ==
Chart (1980)	Peak position
Billboard Top LPs	83
Billboard Top Soul LPs	17

=== Singles ===
Year	Single	Chart positions	
Year	Single	US R&B	US Dance
1980	"Big Time"	17	38
