= Mary Jane (Rick James song) =

Single by Rick James

from the album Come Get It!
- B-side: "Dream Maker"
- Released: September 9, 1978
- Recorded: 1978
- Genre: Funk; R&B
- Length: 4:57
- Label: Gordy / Motown
- Songwriter: Rick James
- Producers: Rick James, Art Stewart

Rick James singles chronology
"You and I" (1978)	"Mary Jane" (1978)	"High on You Love Suite" (1979)

"Mary Jane" is a song by American musician Rick James. It was released on September 9, 1978, as the second single from his debut album Come Get It!. The song peaked in the top five on the R&B charts in the United States in 1978, and crossed over to the US Hot 100.

== Background ==
As one of his earliest hits as a solo artist, it is one of his most notable songs. It was composed by James, along with keyboardist Billy Nunn, who was credited for the keyboards, strings, background vocals, helping to compose the song, arranging flute parts, and other instrumentation work. The lyrics of the song are a thinly veiled ode to James' love of marijuana aka "Mary Jane". During live performances of the song, James frequently had stage props that looked like giant joints and then would light up an actual joint.

== Sampling (live versions) ==
"Mary Jane" has been sampled many times within rap, pop, and R&B, mainly coming from James's live performances of the song in 1981 (from Live in Long Beach, CA, July 1981) and in 1982.

The 1-second phrase "look at ya" from the 1981 recording was used 20 years later as the vocal refrain following a piano intro in Kanye West's song "Runaway". Three months before, West appeared on and produced "Live Fast, Die Young" for Rick Ross which sampled the same performance 20 seconds earlier ("I wanna show you how you all look like beautiful stars tonight") and three minutes later ("sing!"). The "sing" clip was additionally used in Lana Del Rey's "Blue Jeans" and on Travis Scott's song "Sin City" from West's album Cruel Summer. In January 2011, West sampled once again, with James saying "Come on, baby", on the song "Eyez Closed" on Snoop Dogg's 2011 album Doggumentary.

The 1982 live performance of "Mary Jane" was sampled by Kendrick Lamar on his song "DNA", where Rick James exclaimed, "Give me some ganja".

== Charts ==
Chart (1978)	Peak position
US Billboard Hot 100	41
US Billboard Hot Soul Singles	3
