= Mary Jane Girls =

American R&B, soul and funk group

- Left to right: Maxi, JoJo, Corvette and Candi

Background information
- Origin: Los Angeles, California, U.S.
- Genres: R&B; soul; funk; post-disco
- Years active: 1981–1987, 1995–1997, 2010–present
- Label: Gordy
- Past members: Joanne "JoJo" McDuffie; Cheryl "Cheri" Wells; Candice "Candi" Ghant; Kimberly "Maxi" Wuletich; Yvette "Corvette" Marine

The Mary Jane Girls are an American girl group formed in Los Angeles, California, in 1981. Formed by Rick James, the original lineup comprised JoJo McDuffie, Cheri Wells, Candice Ghant, and Kimberly Wuletich. Known for their on-stage sexual image, the group debuted on Motown's imprint Gordy Records with the release of their Top 10 dance songs "Candy Man" and "All Night Long" from their debut album Mary Jane Girls (1983).

The group achieved their first gold album with Only Four You in 1985. The album's single, "In My House", became their highest-charting single, peaking in the top ten on the US Billboard Hot 100. During the recording of their third album, the group was disbanded after a contractual dispute between Rick James and Gordy Records. The Mary Jane Girls briefly reformed as a trio with McDuffie, Ghant, and Wuletich in 1995, only to disband again in 1997.

In 2010, two spin-off groups featuring original members appeared. Original member Candice Ghant billed her spin-off group as the Mary Jane Girls, which include singers Val Young and Farah Melanson. Original members Cheri Wells and Kimberly Wuletich billed their group as MJG Starring Maxi and Cheri of the Original Mary Jane Girls. The Mary Jane Girls have been inducted into the Rhythm & Blues Music Hall of Fame in 2019.

== History ==
=== 1981–1982: Formation and early years ===
In 1981, American singer and musician Rick James was looking for background vocalists for his Street Songs Tour. JoJo McDuffie, a local session singer who was working at a record store, was introduced to James by his bass guitarist Oscar Alston. During the tour, James referred to his female backup singers as the Mary Jane Band, which consisted of McDuffie, Taborah Johnson, and Lisa Sarna. After touring as a background vocalists for his concert tour, James wrote and produced songs for the group. Although press photos were taken and several songs were recorded, Johnson and Sarna departed before the project went any further.

James eventually proposed to Motown that McDuffie be offered a solo career but miscommunication caused the label to sign an all-female group, which he determined would be the Mary Jane Girls. Cheri Wells was the second member selected for the group. James later added Candice Ghant, a Motown session singer and former member of the disco group SofTouch. Kimberly Wuletich was the fourth member added to the group after being introduced to James by one of his brother. Although James insisted that the group's name was a reference to the candy mary jane rather than to marijuana, McDuffie later confirmed the group was named after the slang word for marijuana which was also a favored recreational drug of James.

=== 1983–1984: Mary Jane Girls ===
In January 1983, Rick James began working on the Mary Jane Girls' album, along with members of the Stone City Band. During the recording of the album, McDuffie chosen to be the lead singer and she was mainly backed by session singers Julia Waters Tillman and Maxine Waters Willard. However according to liner notes, Cheri Wells sang lead on the song "Jealously" while Candice Ghant co-leads "You Are My Heaven" alongside McDuffie. The resulting debut album, Mary Jane Girls, was released on April 13, 1983, to critical acclaim. Mary Jane Girls peaked at number fifty-six on the Billboard 200 and number six on the Top R&B/Hip-Hop Albums chart. The album's lead single, "Candy Man", peaked at number 23 on the US Hot Black Singles chart. The follow-up single "All Night Long" peaked at number 11 on the US Hot Black Singles chart and number 13 on the UK Singles chart. The group toured as the opening act for Rick James' Cold Blooded Tour and were backed by the Stone City Band. The male band members also sang the background vocals to support McDuffie as lead vocalist.

=== 1985–1986: Lineup changes and Only Four You ===
After their tour came to its conclusion, Cheri Wells departed from the group, citing feeling limited by James' control over the group. During an audition to replace Jody Watley in the group Shalamar, Wells met Yvette Marine. After Marine spoke to Wells about her departure from the Mary Jane Girls, Marine reached out to Rick James to audition for his group. After adding Marine to the lineup, the group began recording their second album. In the US, Only Four You was released on February 14, 1985, to generally positive reviews. It peaked at number 18 on the Billboard 200, selling over 500,000 copies within five months and earning a gold certification by the Recording Industry Association of America (RIAA). The lead single, "In My House", followed the album's release and peaked at number seven on the Billboard Hot 100. "Wild and Crazy Love", the second single from the album, peaked number 42 on the Billboard Hot 100 and number 10 on the US Hot Black Singles chart. The album's final two singles "Break It Up" and "Shadow Lover" failed to meet the success of its predecessors.

The group proceeded to tour as the opening act for Rick James' Glow Tour. In September 1985, the group headlined their concert tour. In July 1986, the group released a single titled "Walk Like a Man", a cover of The Four Seasons hit, on the soundtrack of the comedy film A Fine Mess. Their version peaked at number 41 on the Billboard Hot 100. In the summer of 1986, the group embarked on another tour alongside The Stone City Band, Val Young, and Process and the Doo Rags. By late 1986, the group had completed the recording their third album Conversations, which was planned to be released in the final quarter of 1986. Despite this, plans to release the album were derailed when Rick James engaged in a contractual dispute with Gordy Records over the status of his career and his various bands. The ending resulted in James leaving Gordy Records and taking the Mary Jane Girls along with him.

=== 1987–present: Disbandment and aftermath ===
With lack of financial and marketing support, the Mary Jane Girls disbanded in 1987. Although in a 2012 interview, McDuffie attributed the group's disbandment to several factors including work ethic, the group's vocal ability, and egos. JoJo McDuffie left the music industry and worked as a school teacher and receptionist. Kimberly Wuletich also left the music industry and became a celebrity chef. Cheri Wells joined Morris Day's all-female band The Day Zs in a one-off self-titled album in 1990 on Reprise Records, which spawned a single titled "Certainly". Candice Ghant continued working as a session singer and at music industry trade magazine Black Radio Exclusive. Yvette Marine also became a session singer, performing background vocals on albums by Teena Marie, Pebbles, and Paula Abdul. She eventually sued Virgin Records, claiming that she had shared lead vocals on the songs "Opposites Attract", "Knocked Out", and "I Need You", on Abdul's album Forever Your Girl. Her lawsuit was dismissed in 1993.

In 1995, the Mary Jane Girls reformed as trio with McDuffie, Ghant, and Wuletich. A remix of "All Night Long" by Michael Gray and Jon Pearn, was released as a single at peaked number 51 on the UK Singles chart. The group made a televised performance on The Jenny Jones Show. The group featured on American rapper Mack 10's song "On Them Thangs" for his self-titled album. Released as the second single from his album, "On Them Thangs" peaked number 74 on the US Hot R&B/Hip-Hop Songs chart. The group disbanded again in 1997. McDuffie continued performing and eventually recorded with Rick James on his album Urban Rapsody, released in October 1997.

In 2003, the Mary Jane Girls were featured in an episode of VH1's "Where Are They Now?" episode. Ghant, Wells, Wuletich, and Marine were interviewed together. McDuffie, who was touring as a background singer for Barry White in Europe, appeared in a separate interview. In 2009, McDuffie's husband Robert Funderburg applied for control of the trademark "Mary Jane Girls", but the application was abandoned in 2010. By June 2010, Wuletich and Wells reunited and began touring as the Mary Jane Girls. They later filed a trademark to perform as "MJG Starring Maxi and Cheri of the Original Mary Jane Girls". In the same year, Ghant had formed her own version of the Mary Jane Girls, along with singers Farah Melanson and Val Young. In 2013, the estate of Rick James sued Wuletich and Wells, preventing them from performing under the name Mary Jane Girls. The estate held that the group's name was owned by James and not the members. In 2014, the group's third album Sweet Conversations, which was shelved in 1986, was released as part of a larger retrospective of James's work by Motown Records.

As of 2024, Wells and Wuletich continue to perform as MJG Starring Maxi and Cheri of the Original Mary Jane Girls; which consist of Cheri Wells, Kimberly "Maxi" Wuletich, and two other female singers: Kanika Conwright and Makeda Francisco. Ghant performs with singers Val Young and Farah Melanson as the Mary Jane Girls.

== Artistry ==
=== Musical style ===
Majority of their music was written and produced by Rick James. In an interview with Los Angeles Times, James stated, "It's easier for me to write for women than it is to write for myself. When I'm writing for myself, there’s only one perspective: I'm putting my heart on the line. When I write for women, it's not quite as personal and there's many different views, more variety and spice. There's four girls in this group, so I can write from four different perspectives." Rolling Stone magazine have referred to the Mary Jane Girls' first two albums as the most consistent, tuneful and least problematic work of Rick James' career.

=== Public image ===
As part of the group's image, James also had each member adopted an individual persona, as an extension of his fantasy. McDuffie was styled as a street-wise girl, Ghant as a supermodel, Wells, as a valley girl, and Wuletich as a dominatrix. Although the women learned choreographed dance routines and practiced under a vocal coach, the group's profile was inadvertently bolstered by their sexual on-stage attire, titillating lyrics, and sensual music videos. They were often compared to Vanity 6 and Apollonia 6, who were known for their seductive and arousing image. The Mary Jane Girls often dismissed this, stating that unlike their comparison, they have actual vocal talent.

However due to the group's sexual image, they were often viewed as "sex objects first and singers second". Music critic Ron Wynn of AllMusic commented that "They were no great shakes as vocalists, but made up for it with a visual act that took male listeners' minds off the fact that they were hearing, in some instances, minimal harmonies and leads." Lead singer McDuffie expressed on several occasions that the group had to prove several times that they could actually sing. In 1986, the group began to speak out about the double standard in the music industry involving sexism and talent. During an interview with Jet magazine, the group stated, "We like to project the image of being strong women as well as being talented women. We can't help it if we're talented and sexy too." The group also elaborated on their experiences with racism and sexism. As James had creative control over the group, some media outlets referred to them as the singing sexpots or James' girl toys.

== Legacy ==
In 2014, the Mary Jane Girls received an honorary HAL Award. The group was inducted into the Rhythm & Blues Music Hall of Fame in 2019.

== Discography ==
=== Studio albums ===
Title	Album details	Peak chart positions					Sales	Certifications
Title	Album details	US	US R&B	CAN	NZ	UK	Sales	Certifications
Mary Jane Girls	Released: April 13, 1983; Label: Gordy; Formats: CD, cassette, LP	56	6	—	—	51	US: 500,000	
Only Four You	Released: February 14, 1985; Label: Gordy; Formats: CD, cassette, LP	18	5	67	28	—	US: 700,000	RIAA: Gold
Sweet Conversations	Released: 2014; Label: Motown; Formats: Digital download	—	—	—	—	—		
"—" denotes a recording that did not chart or was not released in that territory.

=== Compilation albums ===
- In My House: The Very Best of the Mary Jane Girls (1994, Motown)
- 20th Century Masters – The Millennium Collection: The Best of the Mary Jane Girls (2001, Motown)

=== Singles ===
Year	Title	Peak chart positions										Album
Year	Title	US	US R&B	US Dan	AUS	BEL	CAN	IRE	NLD	NZ	UK	Album
1983	"Candy Man"	101	23	8	—	—	—	—	—	—	60	Mary Jane Girls
1983	"All Night Long"	101	11	8	—	—	—	18	—	—	13	Mary Jane Girls
1983	"Boys"	102	29	8	—	—	—	—	—	—	74	Mary Jane Girls
1984	"Jealousy"	106	84	—	—	—	—	—	—	—	—	Mary Jane Girls
1985	"In My House"	7	3	1	19	8	6	—	6	6	77	Only Four You
1985	"Wild and Crazy Love"	42	10	3	—	26	—	—	—	—	101	Only Four You
1985	"Break It Up"	—	79	33	—	—	—	—	—	—	—	Only Four You
1986	"Shadow Lover"	—	—	—	—	—	—	—	—	—	—	Only Four You
1986	"Walk Like a Man"	41	91	—	—	26	97	—	—	48	—	A Fine Mess
1995	"All Night Long" (The Hustlers Convention Remixes)	—	—	—	—	—	—	—	—	—	51	Non-album single
1995	"On Them Thangs" (Mack 10 featuring the Mary Jane Girls)	105	74	—	—	—	—	—	—	—	—	Mack 10
"—" denotes a recording that did not chart or was not released in that territory.
