= Standing on the Top =

- French release picture sleeve

Single by The Temptations

from the album Reunion
- Released: 1982
- Recorded: 1982
- Genre: Soul, funk
- Length: 4:15 (Single Version) 9:48 (Album Version)
- Label: Gordy (Motown); 1616 GF; Motown (UK); TMGT 1623
- Songwriter: Rick James
- Producer: Rick James

The Temptations singles chronology
"Oh, What a Night" (1981)	"Standing on the Top" (1982)	"More On The Inside" (1982)

"Standing on the Top" is a funk song recorded by the Motown group The Temptations, written and produced by (and featuring) musician Rick James.

== Background ==
The Temptations, after a brief spell at Atlantic Records in the late 1970s, re-signed with Motown, in 1980. In 1982, reunited with three of their former lead singers, David Ruffin, Eddie Kendricks and Dennis Edwards, the group, now a seven-piece act, began a reunion tour. They also recorded a new album together, the aptly titled Reunion, a collaboration Motown founder Berry Gordy, Motown VP Smokey Robinson and punk-funk star Rick James. The Temptations provided backing vocals on James' 1981 hit "Super Freak".

== Details ==
"Standing on the Top" was released as the lead single from the group's Reunion album in April, 1982. The album version was almost ten minutes long (9:48) and the single release split the track into two halves; "Part 1" was released as the A-side (4:15) and "Part 2" as the B-side (5:33).

== Personnel ==
- Lead vocals by David Ruffin, Eddie Kendricks, Melvin Franklin, Dennis Edwards, Richard Street, Glenn Leonard and Rick James
- Background vocals by Otis Williams, Mary Jane Girls, David Ruffin, Eddie Kendricks, Melvin Franklin, Dennis Edwards, Richard Street and Glenn Leonard
- Clavinet by Rick James
- Bass by Oscar Alton
- Drums by Lanise Hughes
- Guitar by Tom McDermott
- Keyboards by Erskine Williams
- Synthesizer by Levi Ruffin
- "Punk Funk" Horns:
  - Saxophone by Chris Powell
  - Trumpets by Ken Scott and LaMorris Payne
- Percussion by Nathan Hughes

== Chart history ==
It proved to be one of The Temptations' biggest hits in several years, making it into the R&B Top Ten (#6), but performing only moderately on both the US and UK Singles Chart, peaking at #66 and #53, respectively. In Canada it peaked on the RPM Top 50 at #32 on July 10, 1982.

Chart (1982)	Peak position
U.K. Singles Chart	53
U.S. Billboard Hot 100	66
U.S. Billboard Dance/Disco Top 80	11
U.S. Billboard Hot Soul Singles	6
