= Street Songs =

Studio album by Rick James
- Released: April 7, 1981
- Recorded: December 1980 – January 1981
- Studios: Record Plant (Sausalito, California); Motown / Hitsville U.S.A. Recording Studios (Hollywood, Los Angeles)
- Genres: Funk; synth-funk; R&B
- Length: 34:45
- Label: Gordy
- Producer: Rick James

Rick James chronology
Garden of Love (1980)	Street Songs (1981)	Throwin' Down (1982)

Singles from Street Songs
- 1. "Give It to Me Baby" Released: February 20, 1981; 2. "Super Freak" Released: August 1981; 3. "Ghetto Life" Released: 1981; 4. "Fire and Desire" Released: 1981

Street Songs is the fifth studio album by American musician Rick James, released in April 1981 on Gordy Records. It contained three of James' biggest hits: the singles "Give It to Me Baby", "Super Freak", and "Fire and Desire".

== Release ==
"Give It to Me Baby", the lead single from the album, became James' second number one single on the R&B chart, spending five weeks at the top spot. The next single, "Super Freak", was an even bigger hit, reaching number 16 on the Billboard Hot 100.

A Deluxe Edition was released in 2001 containing an additional 17 mixes and live versions of the album tracks. Although the song "Fire and Desire" (a duet he performed with singer Teena Marie) was not originally released as a single, the song itself received much airplay on R&B radio stations and has since become a classic hit. James and Marie would reunite to perform the song at the 2004 BET Awards five weeks before James' death.

== Critical reception ==
Professional ratings
Review scores
Source	Rating
AllMusic	5/5 stars
Robert Christgau	A−

The album became an immediate success upon its release, eventually reaching number three on the US Pop chart—James's highest-charting album during his career—and spending twenty weeks at number one on the US R&B chart. The album was certified platinum in the US in July 1981. By 1983, the album had sold nearly four million copies worldwide. At the 24th Annual Grammy Awards (1982), James was nominated for Best Male Rhythm and Blues Vocal Performance for the album while being the first African American artist to be nominated in the Best Male Rock Vocal Performance category for the song "Super Freak".

== Track listing ==
All tracks composed and arranged by Rick James, except where noted.

Side A

1. "Give It to Me Baby" – 4:07
2. "Ghetto Life" – 4:20
3. "Make Love to Me" – 4:48
4. "Mr. Policeman" – 4:17

Side B

1. "Super Freak" (James, Alonzo Miller) – 3:24
2. "Fire and Desire" (Duet with Teena Marie) – 7:17
3. "Call Me Up" – 3:53
4. "Below the Funk (Pass the J)" – 2:36

=== 2001 Deluxe edition ===
Disc one

9. "Give It to Me Baby" (12" version) – 5:42
10. "Give It to Me Baby" (instrumental) – 6:48
11. "Super Freak" (12" version) – 7:05
12. "Super Freak" (instrumental) – 3:33

Disc two (Recorded Live at Long Beach, California, July 30, 1981)

1. "Introduction" – 1:46
2. "Ghetto Life" – 4:21
3. "Big Time" – 7:08
4. "Come Into My Life" – 4:14
5. "I'm a Sucker for Love" – 8:28
6. "Square Biz" – 7:01
7. "Fire It Up" – 3:35
8. "Love Gun" – 5:42
9. "Do You Want Some Funk (Interlude)" – 2:22
10. "Mary Jane" – 10:39
11. "Super Freak" – 4:21
12. "You and I" – 11:48
13. "Give It to Me Baby" – 6:05

=== 2002 remastered edition ===
9. "Give It to Me Baby" (12" version) – 5:42
10. "Super Freak" (12" version) – 7:05

== Personnel ==
Performers

- Rick James – lead vocals
- Ja'net Dubois – background vocals
- Melvin Franklin – background vocals ("Give It to Me Baby")
- Lawrence Hilton-Jacobs – background vocals
- Teena Marie – lead vocals ("Fire and Desire"), background vocals ("Give It to Me Baby", "Mr. Policeman")
- Mary Jane Girls – background vocals
- The Temptations (Dennis Edwards, Melvin Franklin, Glenn Leonard, Richard Street, Otis Williams) – background vocals ("Ghetto Life", "Super Freak")

Musicians

- Gerald Albright – tenor flute ("Make Love to Me", "Fire and Desire")
- Oscar Alston – bass, handclaps, percussion
- Reggie Andrews – string arranger
- Rollice Dale – string contractor
- Clifford J. Ervin – flugelhorn, piccolo, trumpet
- John Ervin – flute, trombone
- Fernando Harkless, Roy Poper – trumpet
- Nathan Hughes, Armando Peraza, Raul Rekow, Bugsy Wilcox – percussion
- Rick James – arranger, bass guitar, composer, drums, guitar, horns, percussion, producer, timbales, timpani
- Daniel LeMelle – flute, handclaps, horn arrangements, alto and tenor saxophone, string arrangements
- Tom McDermott – guitar, percussion
- Alonzo Miller – producer, composer
- Narada Michael Walden – drums
- Stevie Wonder – harmonica soloist ("Mr. Policeman")
- Levi Ruffin – synthesizers

== Charts ==
=== Weekly charts ===
Chart (1981)	Peak position
Australian Albums (Kent Music Report)	76
US Billboard 200	3
US Top R&B/Hip-Hop Albums (Billboard)	1

=== Year-end charts ===
Chart (1981)	Position
US Billboard 200	36
US Top R&B/Hip-Hop Albums (Billboard)	1

Chart (1982)	Position
US Billboard 200	40
US Top R&B/Hip-Hop Albums (Billboard)	19

=== Singles ===
Year	Single	Chart positions		
Year	Single	US	US R&B	US Dance
1981	"Give It to Me Baby"	40	1	1
1981	"Super Freak"	16	3	1
1982	"Ghetto Life"	102	38	—

== Certifications ==
Region	Certification	Certified units/sales
Canada (Music Canada)	Platinum	100,000^{^}
United States (RIAA)	Platinum	1,000,000^{^}
^{^} Shipments figures based on certification alone.
