= Super Freak =

1981 single by Rick James

- French 7-inch cover art

Single by Rick James

from the album Street Songs
- B-side: "Super Freak (instrumental)"
- Released: August 1981
- Genre: Funk; synth-funk; new wave; R&B
- Length: 3:24 (album/7" version); 7:05 (12" version)
- Label: Gordy
- Songwriters: Rick James; Alonzo Miller
- Producer: Rick James

Rick James singles chronology
"Give It to Me Baby" (1981)	"Super Freak" (1981)	"Ghetto Life" (1981)

Music video
- "Super Freak" on YouTube

"Super Freak" is a 1981 single produced and performed by American singer Rick James. The song, co-written by James and Alonzo Miller, was first released on James' fifth album, Street Songs (1981) and became one of James' signature songs. "Freak" is a slang term for the sexually adventurous, as described in the song's lyrics, "She's a very kinky girl / The kind you don't take home to mother". Rolling Stone magazine ranked the song number 477 in its list of the 500 Greatest Songs of All Time in 2004, number 481 in 2010, and number 153 in an updated list in 2021. The song was nominated for the Grammy for Best Male Rock Vocal Performance at the 1982 Grammys. The song has been sampled by MC Hammer in 1990, Jay-Z in 2006, and Nicki Minaj in 2022.

== Recording ==
"Super Freak" was recorded with other tracks for the Street Songs album during December 1980 – January 1981 at the Record Plant, in Sausalito, California and Motown / Hitsville U.S.A. Recording Studios, Hollywood, California. It features background vocals from James' Motown labelmates the Temptations—whose bass singer, Melvin Franklin, was one of James's idols—and Canadian singer Taborah Johnson. The bass was played by Oscar Alston. The tenor saxophone solo is by Stone City Band member Daniel LeMelle. James' improvised lyrics were later toned down by Los Angeles DJ Alonzo Miller, who received co-writing credit. James apparently was not particularly excited about the song, but reputedly wanted to have something on the album that "white folks could dance to."

== Charts ==
=== Weekly charts ===
Chart (1981–1982)	Peak position
Australia (Kent Music Report)	26
Belgium (Ultratop 50 Flanders)	2
Canada Top Singles (RPM)	40
Netherlands (Dutch Top 40)	2
Netherlands (Single Top 100)	3
New Zealand (Recorded Music NZ)	4
US Billboard Hot 100	16
US Hot Dance Club Play (Billboard)	1
US Hot Soul Singles (Billboard)	3
US Cash Box Top 100	17
US Record World Singles	14

=== Year-end charts ===
Chart (1981)	Position
Belgium (Ultratop 50 Flanders)	54
Netherlands (Dutch Top 40)	24
Netherlands (Single Top 100)	26

== Certifications ==
Region	Certification	Certified units/sales
Canada (Music Canada)	Gold	50,000^{^}
New Zealand (RMNZ)	Platinum	30,000^{‡}
United Kingdom (BPI)	Platinum	600,000^{‡}
United States (RIAA)	Gold	500,000^{*}
^{*} Sales figures based on certification alone.^{^} Shipments figures based on certification alone.^{‡} Sales+streaming figures based on certification alone.

== Beatfreakz version ==
"Superfreak"

Single by Beatfreakz
- Released: September 29, 2006
- Studio: Beatfreakz (Weesp, Netherlands); Scorccio.com (Barcelona, Spain)
- Genre: House
- Length: 3:25
- Label: Spinnin'
- Songwriters: Rick James; Alonzo Miller
- Producer: Beatfreakz

Beatfreakz singles chronology
"Somebody's Watching Me" (2006)	"Superfreak" (2006)	"Bring the Ghost" (2007)

In 2006, Dutch music group Beatfreakz covered the song as "Superfreak" and released it as a single. This cover reached number seven on the UK Singles Chart and number six in Finland and Hungary.

=== Track listings ===
Dutch CD single

1. "Superfreak" (radio edit)
2. "Superfreak" (club mix)
3. "Superfreak" (Fonzerelli remix)
4. "Superfreak" (Dennis Christopher De-Electro remix)
5. "Streetgirl" (album version)

UK 12-inch single

A1. "Superfreak" (Beatfreakz club mix)
A2. "Superfreak" (Fonzerelli remix)
B1. "Superfreak" (Dennis Christopher De-Electro remix)
B2. "Superfreak" (Friday Night Posse remix)

UK CD1

1. "Superfreak" (radio edit)
2. "Superfreak" (Beatfreakz club mix)

UK CD2

1. "Superfreak" (radio edit)
2. "Superfreak" (Fonzerelli remix)
3. "Superfreak" (Dennis Christopher De-Electro remix)
4. "Superfreak" (Verdez remix)
5. Extended interactive CD-ROM

=== Credits and personnel ===
Credits are lifted from the Dutch and UK CD1 liner notes.

Studios

- Recorded at Beatfreakz Studios (Weesp, Netherlands)
- Sample replays recorded at Scorccio.com Studio (Barcelona, Spain)

Personnel

- Rick James, Alonzo Miller – writing
- Sandro – vocals
- Jassy Tamar Husk – additional vocals
- Beatfreakz – production
- Hal Ritson – vocal production
- Mark Summers – sample replay production
- Ben Cook – executive production
- Dipesh Parmar – executive production assistant
- Antonio Petronzio – photography

=== Charts ===
==== Weekly charts ====
Chart (2006–2007)	Peak position
Belgium (Ultratip Bubbling Under Flanders)	5
CIS Airplay (TopHit)	30
Czech Republic Airplay (ČNS IFPI)	34
Finland (Suomen virallinen lista)	6
France (SNEP)	56
Hungary (Dance Top 40)	6
Hungary (Single Top 40)	6
Ireland (IRMA)	20
Netherlands (Dutch Top 40)	34
Netherlands (Single Top 100)	26
Romania (Romanian Top 100)	66
Russia Airplay (TopHit)	24
Scottish Singles Sales (Official Charts)	6
Ukraine Airplay (TopHit)	145
UK Singles (Official Charts)	7
UK Dance (Official Charts)	5

==== Year-end charts ====
Chart (2006)	Position
Russia Airplay (TopHit)	200
UK Singles (OCC)	189

Chart (2007)	Position
CIS Airplay (TopHit)	184
Russia Airplay (TopHit)	171

=== Release history ===
Region	Date	Format(s)	Label(s)	Ref.
Netherlands	2006	CD	Spinnin'	
United Kingdom	9 October 2006	12-inch vinyl; CD	Data	

== Sampling ==
The predominant riff of the song was most popularly sampled in 1990 by MC Hammer in "U Can't Touch This". The song would then be sampled by Jay-Z in his 2006 song "Kingdom Come", by American group Black Eyed Peas in their 2020 single "Vida Loca", and by Nicki Minaj in her 2022 single, "Super Freaky Girl". Minaj previously appeared in the remix of Big Sean's "Dance (A$$)" (2011), which sampled "U Can't Touch This".

== See also ==
- List of number-one dance singles of 1981 (U.S.)
