= Rick James =

American musician (1948–2004)

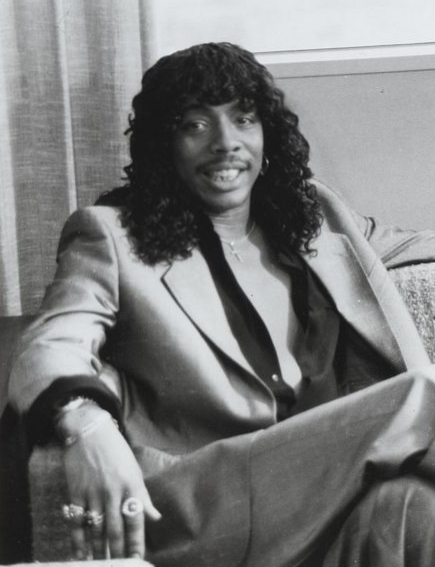
- James on Lifestyles of the Rich and Famous in 1984
- Born: James Ambrose Johnson Jr. February 1, 1948; Buffalo, New York, U.S.
- Died: August 6, 2004 (aged 56); Los Angeles, California, U.S.
- Other name: Ricky Matthews
- Occupations: Singer; songwriter; record producer
- Years active: 1964–2004
- Spouse: Tanya Hijazi (m. 1996; div. 2002)
- Children: 3
- Musical career
- Genres: R&B; soul; funk; rock; disco; doo-wop; post-disco
- Instruments: Vocals; bass guitar; guitar; keyboards; drums; percussion
- Labels: Gordy; Reprise; A&M; Mercury
- Website: rickjames.com

James Ambrose Johnson Jr. (February 1, 1948 – August 6, 2004), better known by his stage name Rick James, was an American singer, songwriter, and record producer.

Born and raised in Buffalo, New York, Rick James began his musical career in his teenage years. He was in various bands before entering the U.S. Naval Reserve to avoid being drafted into the Army. In 1964, James moved to Toronto, Canada, where he formed the rock band The Mynah Birds, who eventually signed a recording deal with Motown Records in 1966. James' career with the group halted after military authorities discovered his whereabouts and eventually convicted him of desertion related charges. He served several months in jail.

After being released, James moved back to Toronto to pull together a new version of the Mynah Birds, with whom he returned to Motown to record. When that lineup folded, he moved to California, where he took over an existing group of Toronto ex-pats, Merryweather, added a new bassist and changed the group's name to Salt and Pepper. After a strong start and some recording for the Atlantic label, the group split and Rick and the group's keyboardist returned to Toronto to form Heaven and Earth with local players. They later merged with a local horn group, Milestone, and continued under a new name, Great White Cane. That group went to Los Angeles, signed to MGM Records' Lion subsidiary. Their ensuing self-titled LP, released in 1972, was well received critically but sold poorly and was out of print very quickly.

After forming the locally popular Stone City Band in his hometown of Buffalo in 1977, James found success as a recording artist after signing with Motown's Gordy Records, releasing the album Come Get It! in 1978 which produced the hits "You and I" and "Mary Jane". In 1981, James released his most successful album, Street Songs, which included career-defining hits such as "Give It to Me Baby" and "Super Freak", the latter song becoming his biggest crossover single, mixing elements of funk, disco, rock, and new wave. James was also known for his soulful ballads such as "Fire & Desire" and "Ebony Eyes". He also had a successful career as a songwriter and producer for other artists, including Teena Marie, the Mary Jane Girls, The Temptations, Eddie Murphy, and Smokey Robinson.

James' mainstream success peaked by the release of his album Glow in 1985 and his appearance on the popular TV show, The A-Team. His subsequent album releases failed to sell as well as their predecessors. Rapper MC Hammer sampled "Super Freak" for his breakout 1990 hit, "U Can't Touch This", which won Best R&B Song at the 33rd Annual Grammy Awards in 1991. James received his only Grammy for composing the song. By the early 1990s, James' career was hampered by his drug addiction, and he was embroiled in legal issues. In 1993, he was convicted of two separate instances of kidnapping and assaulting two different women while under the influence of crack cocaine, resulting in a three-year sentence at Folsom State Prison. He was released on parole in 1996. His health problems halted his career again after he had a mild stroke during a concert in 1998, and he announced a semi-retirement.

In 2004, James returned to pop culture notoriety after he appeared in an episode of Chappelle's Show. The segment involved a Charlie Murphy True Hollywood Stories-style sketch that satirized James' wild lifestyle in the 1980s. This resulted in renewed interest in his music, and that year he returned to perform on the road. He died later that year from heart failure at age 56.

== Life and career ==
=== Early life ===
James Ambrose Johnson Jr. was born on February 1, 1948, in Buffalo, New York, to Mabel (née Sims) and James Ambrose Johnson Sr. He was one of eight children. He was an altar boy and choir member at St. Bridget's Catholic Church. Rick James' father, an autoworker, left the family when Rick James was 10. His mother was a dancer for Katherine Dunham, and later worked as a cleaner in the day, and as a numbers-runner for the Buffalo crime family at night to earn a living.

=== Early career ===
In 1964, Rick James dodged the US Military draft by fleeing to Toronto. Soon after his arrival three drunk men tried to attack him outside a club; a trio of other men came to his aid. One of them, Levon Helm, was at the time a member of Ronnie Hawkins' backing band. Helm invited Rick James to their show later that night and he ended up performing onstage with the band. To evade US military authorities, Rick James went under the assumed name "Ricky James Matthews". That same year, Rick James formed The Mynah Birds, a band that produced a fusion of soul, folk, and rock music. In 1965, the band briefly recorded for the Canadian division of Columbia Records, releasing a single, "Mynah Bird Hop"/"Mynah Bird Song". At one point, Nick St. Nicholas, later of Steppenwolf fame, was a member; by the time "Mynah Bird Hop" was recorded, bassist Bruce Palmer had replaced him. Rick James and Palmer recruited guitarists Tom Morgan and Xavier Taylor and drummer Rick Mason to form a new Mynah Birds lineup, and soon traveled to Detroit to record with Motown. Before the group began recording their first songs for the label, Morgan left, unhappy about the label's attitude toward the musicians. Neil Young eventually took Morgan's place. It was while in Detroit that Rick James met his musical heroes, Marvin Gaye and Stevie Wonder. After meeting Wonder and telling him his name, Wonder felt the name "Ricky James Matthews" was "too long" and told Rick James to shorten it to "Ricky James".

In 1966, a financial dispute in Toronto between Rick James and the Mynah Birds' handler, Morley Shelman led to Motown's learning of Rick James' fugitive status with the Navy. Hoping to prevent any scrutiny, Motown execs told Rick they would not be releasing any more of his material and convinced him to come back and work with them after straightening out his legal issues. Rick James surrendered himself to the FBI, and, in May 1966, was sentenced by the Navy to five months' hard labor for unauthorized absence. He was not yet 19 years old. Rick James escaped from the Brooklyn Naval Brig after only six weeks' confinement, but following another six months as a fugitive, surrendered himself a second time. With help from his mother, Rick James found legal assistance from his cousin, future Congressman Louis Stokes, and another attorney, former Marine Captain John Bracken, who pled Rick James' second court-martial down from a potential five years' hard labor to five months. After his release from Portsmouth Naval Prison in August 1967, Rick James returned to Toronto and endured another detention, initially derailing resumption of his career with Mynah Bird bandmate Neil Merryweather, with whom he would later collaborate, first at Motown and then in Los Angeles.

In 1968, again working under the pseudonym Ricky Matthews, Rick James produced and wrote songs at Motown for acts such as The Miracles, Bobby Taylor & the Vancouvers, and The Spinners. It was during this third stint at Motown that Rick James met musician Greg Reeves. Reeves, hoping to find a better situation than the US$38 a week (US$787 in 2025 dollars) he was earning as a session bassist for Berry Gordy, joined Rick James, looking to "hitch a lift from Neil Young's rising star," and relocated to Los Angeles.

On one of his first nights in Los Angeles, Rick James was crashing on musician Stephen Stills' couch. When he awoke, he saw a stoned young man sitting on the floor in the lotus position. The man's wrists were bleeding, so a scared Rick James sought help. Rick James was later formally introduced to the man, who was Jim Morrison, lead singer of the Doors. After the Doors opened for Buffalo Springfield at the Whisky a Go Go, Morrison tricked Rick James into taking acid.

In California, Rick James initially worked as a duo with Greg Reeves, but soon after Rick James introduced Reeves to Neil Young, it was Reeves, not Rick James, who was hired as bassist for the newly formed rock supergroup, Crosby, Stills, Nash & Young. Around this time Rick James formed several versions of the rock band Salt'N'Pepper. Rick James claimed that in 1969 friend and hairstylist Jay Sebring invited him to attend a party at actress Sharon Tate’s house, but he was too hungover to get out of bed. The next morning, he discovered that Sebring had been murdered when he saw the Los Angeles Times headline "Sharon Tate, Four Others Murdered."

In 1970, Rick James and Salt'N'Pepper member Ed Roth participated in the recording of Bruce Palmer's solo album The Cycle Is Complete. The duo also recorded as part of the group Heaven and Earth in Toronto. Heaven and Earth eventually changed their name to Great White Cane and recorded a self-titled album for the Los Angeles label Lion Records, released in 1972. Rick James formed another band, Hot Lips, afterwards. He also briefly replaced Mendelson Joe in the Toronto blues band McKenna Mendelson Mainline. During this period, Rick James and Mainline guitarist Mike McKenna co-wrote the song "You Make the Magic", which would later be released by The Chambers Brothers as a B-side to their single "Boogie Children."

=== Solo career ===
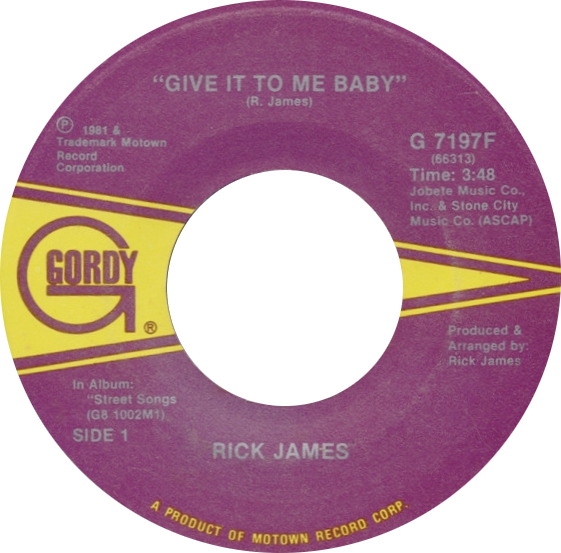
US vinyl single of "Give It to Me Baby" by Rick James

In 1973, James signed with A&M Records, under the name Rick James. The first single, "My Mama", was released in 1974, becoming a club hit in Europe.

In 1976, Rick James returned to Buffalo and formed the Stone City Band. Shortly thereafter, he recorded "Get Up and Dance!", his second single to be released. In 1977, Rick James and the Stone City Band signed a contract with Motown's Gordy Records imprint and began recording their first album in both New York City and Los Angeles.

In April 1978, Rick James released his debut solo album, Come Get It!, which included the Stone City Band. The album launched the top 20 hit, "You and I", which became his first number-one R&B hit. The album also included the hit single, "Mary Jane". It eventually sold a million copies, launching Rick James' musical career to stardom and helping out Motown Records at a time when label fortunes had dwindled. In early 1979, Rick James' second album, Bustin' Out of L Seven, followed the previous album's success, reaching the top 20 of the Billboard 200 and reached number two on the R&B album charts. A third album, Fire It Up, was released in late 1979. Around that same period, Rick James launched his first headlining tour, the Fire It Up Tour, and agreed to invite the then-upcoming artist, Prince, as well as singer Teena Marie, as his opening act. The Fire It Up Tour was marked by elaborate stage production and increasingly provocative performances, further enhancing James' reputation for flamboyance and excess during the late 1970s.

Following the end of the tour in 1980, Rick James released the ballads-heavy Garden of Love, which was a relative flop, only reaching number 83 on the Billboard 200. In 1981, Rick James recorded his best-selling album to date, Street Songs, which, like his previous four albums, was a concept album. Street Songs featured a fusion mix of different genres, including rock and new wave, as well as Rick James' brand of crossover funk, enabling Rick James' own style of "punk funk". The album featured hit singles such as "Ghetto Life", the Teena Marie duet "Fire and Desire", "Give It to Me Baby", and his biggest crossover hit to date, "Super Freak", which peaked at number 16 on the Billboard Hot 100 and sold more than a million copies in the United States. Street Songs peaked at number one R&B and number three pop and sold more than 4 million copies worldwide. Following up that success, Rick James released two successive gold-certified albums, 1982's Throwin' Down and 1983's Cold Blooded. In 1982, Rick James produced the Temptations' Top 10 R&B comeback hit, "Standing on the Top". In 1983, Rick James recorded the hit duet, "Ebony Eyes", with singer Smokey Robinson, as well as a ballad "Tell Me What You Want" with an introduction by Billy Dee Williams.

During this period, as Prince also became a success as a producer of other acts including The Time and Vanity 6, Rick James pursued a similar path, launching the acts Process and the Doo-Rags, and the Mary Jane Girls, the latter of which featuring his former background singer Joanne "JoJo" McDuffie as the lead vocalist and background performer. The Mary Jane Girls became successful, on the strength of the James-produced hits "All Night Long", "Candy Man", and "In My House". In 1985, Rick James produced another hit for entertainer Eddie Murphy with the song "Party All the Time". That same year, he even found time to release his next solo album, Glow and also appeared on an episode of The A-Team with Isaac Hayes. After the release of his ninth solo album, The Flag, in 1986, Rick James signed with Warner Bros. Records, which released the album Wonderful in 1988, featuring the hit, "Loosey's Rap".

Rick James' controversial and provocative image became troublesome sometimes. Famous for promoting the use of marijuana live in concerts during a time that simple possession could lead to a long-term prison sentence, Rick James was often threatened by cops in various cities that he would be arrested if he smoked marijuana on stage during performances of songs such as "Fire It Up" and "Mary Jane". According to Kerry Gordy, most Motown executives erroneously thought the latter song was a "simple cute love song to a girl," not knowing the song was about marijuana.

Rick James' overtly sexual bravado made it tough for him to be a bigger mainstream act. After the debut of the fledgling music video network MTV in August 1981, Rick James tried to present the music video for "Super Freak" to the label, only for the channel to turn the video down. Rick James accused the network of racism. MTV denied this, stating the real reason "Super Freak" was turned down by MTV was because they felt Rick James' video was too vulgar for the channel. When younger artists such as Michael Jackson and Prince found fame on the channel, Rick James accused the two singers of being "tokens" in a 1983 interview, demanding that any black artist who had a video aired on MTV take their video off the channel in protest. Rick James' rant was cosigned by David Bowie, who argued with MTV VJ Mark Goodman about the lack of black artists being featured on the channel despite the successes of Jackson and Prince. Rick James finally appeared on MTV a couple years later with Murphy's music video to "Party All the Time".

=== Decline ===
In 1989, Rick James' 11th album, Kickin', was released only in the UK, and only as a promotional release. By 1990, he had lost his deal with Reprise/Warner Bros., and Rick James began struggling with personal and legal troubles. That year, MC Hammer released his hit signature song, "U Can't Touch This", which sampled the prominent opening riff from "Super Freak". Rick James and his co-writer on "Super Freak", Alonzo Miller, sued Hammer for shared songwriting credit, and all three received a Grammy Award for Best R&B Song in 1991.

In 1997, Rick James released Urban Rapsody, his first album since his release from prison on assault charges, and he toured to promote the album. That year, he discussed his life and career in interviews for the VH1 musical documentary series Behind the Music, which aired in early 1998. Rick James' musical career slowed again after he suffered a minor stroke during a concert in 1998. He was featured on the song "Love Gravy" with Ike Turner for the 1998 soundtrack album Chef Aid: The South Park Album. Rick James accepted an offer by Eddie Murphy to appear in the comedy-drama Life (1999).

=== Resurgence ===
Rick James enjoyed a career revival after his appearance on Chappelle's Show. He supported Teena Marie's tour of her album La Doña and toured with her in May 2004, playing with her at the KBLX Stone Soul Picnic, Pioneer Amphitheatre, Hayward, California. James gave his last public appearance and performance at the fourth annual BET Awards on June 29, 2004. He performed a live rendition of "Fire & Desire" with Teena Marie. Rick James called out a girl backstage who didn't recognize him by saying, "Never mind who you thought I was, I'm Rick James, bitch!" The audience erupted and gave Rick James a standing ovation as he walked off the stage.

=== Autobiography ===
At the time of his death, Rick James was working on an autobiography, The Confessions of Rick James: Memoirs of a Super Freak, as well as a new album. The book was finally published in 2007 by Colossus Books and features a picture of his tombstone. Noted music journalist/biographer David Ritz, who had been employed by Rick James to work on the book with him, later said that this version did not truly reflect how the musician wanted himself portrayed. In 2014, Ritz published his own, re-edited version, Glow: The Autobiography of Rick James.

=== Music publishing sale ===
In November 2020, Rick James' estate confirmed the sale of a 50% stake in his publishing and masters catalog to the Hipgnosis Songs Fund, founded by Canadian music industry executive and entrepreneur Merck Mercuriadis.

=== Documentary ===
In 2021, Rick James was the subject of a documentary film, Bitchin': The Sound and Fury of Rick James, directed by Sacha Jenkins, that was produced and broadcast by Showtime. According to Rotten Tomatoes, the documentary has 100% positive reviews from 13 professional reviewers.

=== Stage musical ===
Rick James' life was depicted in a 2024 touring stage production musical titled Super Freak: A Rick James Story produced by Je'Caryous Johnson and Rick James' daughter Ty James. Stokley Williams of the notable R&B band Mint Condition is set to star in the titular role.

== Personal life ==
=== Relationships and children ===
Rick James had two children with Syville Morgan, a former singer and songwriter. They had a daughter, Tyenza, and a son, Rick Jr.

He dated actress Linda Blair from 1982 to 1984. They met after James read an interview where Blair called him sexy. He contacted her and spent time getting to know the actress during a short stint living at the Chateau Marmont in Hollywood. Early in their relationship, Blair became pregnant and had an abortion. He wrote in his memoir, "I loved Linda and it hurt me that she would choose to abort our child without even wanting to talk to me about it first. I still look back on her choice with sadness and wonder about our baby, and how having that child might have changed my life." His hit song "Cold Blooded" was about his relationship with Blair. "It was about how Linda could freeze my blood," he wrote in his memoir.

In 1989, James met 17-year-old party-goer Tanya Hijazi. The two began a romance shortly after. In 1993, the couple had their only child and his youngest, Tazman. Following their respective releases from prison for assaulting Mary Sauger and Frances Alley, they married in 1996 and divorced in 2002.

Rick James was very close with Teena Marie, whom he met and began collaborating with in 1979. Teena Marie stated they were engaged "for two weeks." Their professional partnership lasted into 2004, when Marie released her comeback album, La Doña, which included her and James' duet "I Got You". When he died, Teena Marie said she was "devastated by his death" and struggled with a painkiller addiction following his passing.

=== Friendships ===
Rick James had a close friendship with Eddie Murphy, whom he met in 1981. He was also close to Murphy's older brother Charlie, who worked as a security guard for his brother.

Rick James was good friends with actress Debbie Allen. He said that Allen once invited him to a Broadway show and sent a car to pick him up, but that during the show, he fell asleep due to exhaustion from prior sexual activities. James also said that afterwards, Allen confronted him in the dressing room, pinned him down and pleaded that he was throwing his life away, prompting him to promise to change his ways, but he broke his promise that same night.

Rick James was also a friend of fellow Motown act performers Smokey Robinson and Marvin Gaye, singers he idolized as a teenager. Additionally, he befriended Gaye's second wife, Janis, and became the godfather of Gaye's daughter Nona. His relationship with Robinson began shortly after James signed with Motown and, in 1983, the duo recorded the hit "Ebony Eyes".

Rick James also idolized former Temptations lead singer David Ruffin and Ruffin's self-proclaimed cousin, bass vocalist Melvin Franklin, and grabbed at the chance to produce the hit "Standing on the Top" for them in 1982. Before that, the then-current lineup of the group recorded background vocals on two Rick James-associated projects—Rick James' Street Songs (singing "Ghetto Life" and "Super Freak") and Teena Marie's It Must Be Magic (singing on the title track). In "Super Freak", "It Must Be Magic", and "Standing on the Top", Rick James famously shouted out, "Temptations, SING!"

=== Drug abuse and health problems ===
Rick James' drug abuse began in his teens, first with marijuana and heroin. He began using cocaine in the late 1960s. Although Rick James claimed that he quit cocaine when he entered prison, his autopsy showed there was a small amount of the drug in his bloodstream at the time of his death.

His drug use led to major health problems. In April 1984, he was hospitalized after being found unconscious at his house by a friend. By the 1990s, Rick James' drug abuse was public knowledge. He was heavily addicted to cocaine and later admitted to spending about $7,000 per week on drugs for five years straight. In 1998, Rick James suffered a stroke after a blood vessel ruptured in his neck during a concert at Mile High Stadium in Denver. Earlier that year, he had hip replacement surgery to repair bone damage "from jumping around on stage and substance abuse."

=== Kidnapping, rape, and assault convictions ===
On August 2, 1991, Rick James and his girlfriend Tanya Hijazi were arrested on charges of holding 24-year-old Frances Alley hostage for up to six days, tying her up, forcing her to perform sexual acts, and burning her legs and abdomen with the hot end of a crack cocaine pipe during a week-long cocaine binge. James faced a maximum sentence of life in prison if convicted on all charges, which included assault with a deadly weapon, aggravated mayhem, torture, forcible oral copulation, false imprisonment and kidnapping.

On November 3, 1992, while out on bail for that incident, Rick James, under the influence of cocaine, assaulted music executive Mary Sauger at Sunset Tower (then the St. James Club and Hotel) in West Hollywood. Sauger said she met Rick James and Hijazi for a business meeting, but that the two then kidnapped and beat her over a 20-hour period.

In September 1993, Hijazi was sentenced to four years for her role. Rick James was found guilty of both offenses but was cleared of a torture charge that could have put him in prison for the rest of his life. In January 1994, James was sentenced to five years and four months. While serving his time at Folsom State Prison, Rick James lost a civil suit to Sauger, who was awarded nearly $2 million in damages in 1994. James was ordered to pay her about $1 million; the hotel and a private security firm were found liable for nearly $750,000 in damages due to negligence. Rick James was released from prison on August 21, 1996, after serving more than two years.

In 1998, Rick James was accused of sexually assaulting a 26-year-old woman, but the charges were later dropped. In 2020, his estate was sued for $50 million by a woman who accused him of raping her when she was 15 years old at a group home for troubled youths in Buffalo, New York, in 1979. The suit was later dismissed.

== Death ==
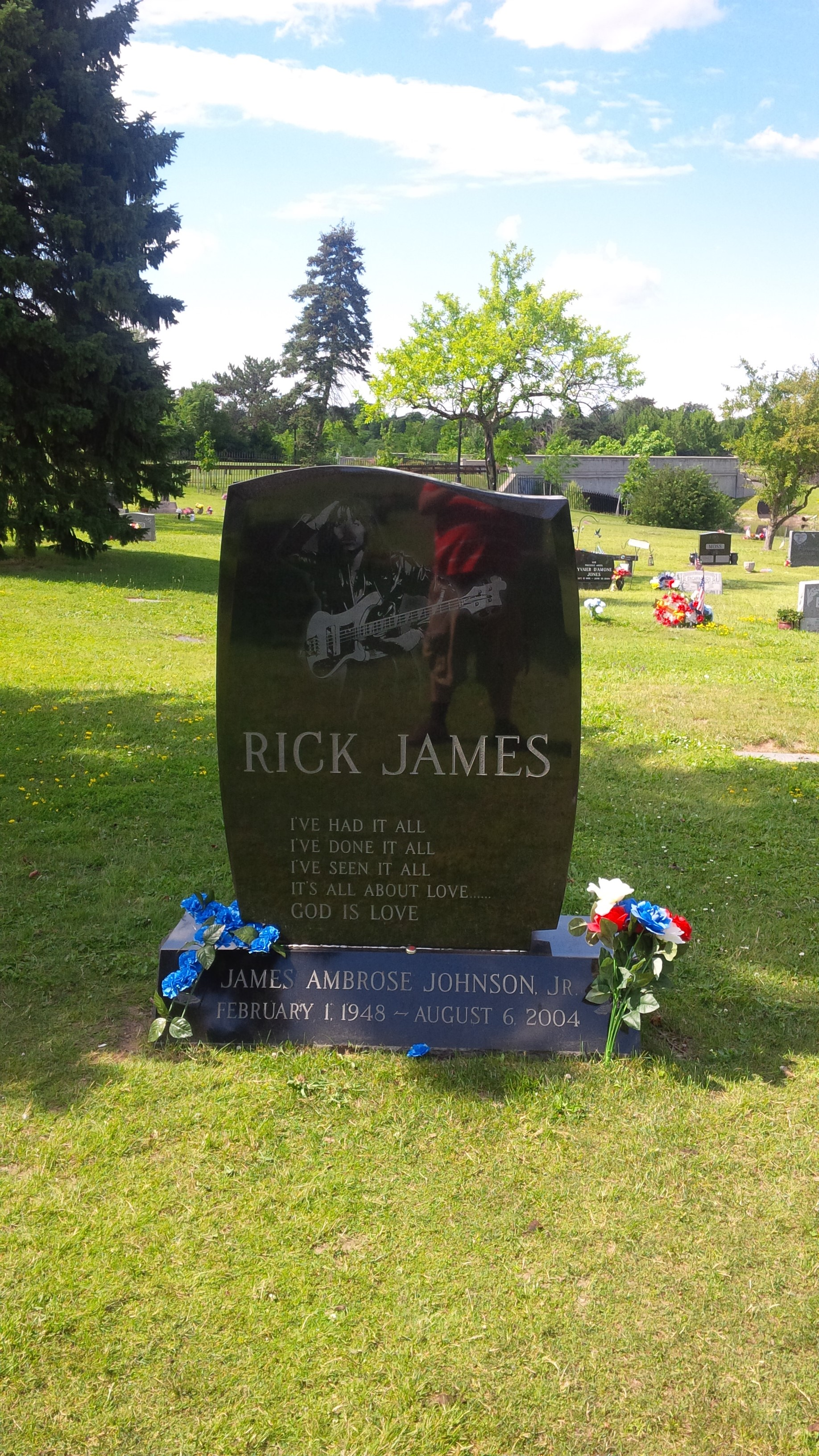
James' grave at Forest Lawn Cemetery, Buffalo, New York

On the morning of August 6, 2004, Rick James' caretaker found him dead in his Los Angeles home at the Oakwood Toluca Hills apartment complex, just outside Burbank. He was 56 years old. His longtime publicist, Sujata Murthy, released a statement to the media stating he died of natural causes. Rick James died from pulmonary failure and cardiac failure, associated with his various health conditions of diabetes, a stroke, pacemaker, and heart attack. His autopsy found alprazolam (Xanax), diazepam (Valium), bupropion (Wellbutrin), citalopram (Celexa), hydrocodone, chlorpheniramine, methamphetamine, cocaine and digoxin (Digitalis) in his blood. However, the coroner stated that "none of the drugs or drug combinations were found to be at levels that were life-threatening in and of themselves".

Following a public viewing for fans, a private memorial was held at Forest Lawn Memorial Park – Hollywood Hills. A public funeral was held at St. John Baptist Church in Buffalo, New York, on Saturday, August 14, 2004, with an estimated 6,000 fans attending the viewing, and cremation following the service; a free tribute concert took place later that day in Martin Luther King Jr. Park. His ashes were buried at the Forest Lawn Cemetery in Buffalo. In the 2025 Netflix documentary Being Eddie, Eddie Murphy stated that he paid for James' funeral expenses.

== Accolades ==
Rick James received the following honors:

- 1982: American Music Award for Favorite Soul/R&B Album (Street Songs)
- 1996: Inducted into the Buffalo Music Hall of Fame.
- 2025: Inducted into the National Rhythm and Blues Hall of Fame.

=== Grammy Awards ===
Rick James was nominated for three Grammy Awards, winning one as a co-writer for MC Hammer's song "U Can't Touch This".

Year	Nominee / work	Award	Result
1982	"Super Freak"	Grammy Award for Best Rock Vocal Performance, Male	Nominated
1982	Street Songs	Best R&B Vocal Performance, Male	Nominated
1991	"U Can't Touch This"	Grammy Award for Best R&B Song	Won

== Discography ==
Studio albums

- Come Get It! (with The Stone City Band, 1978)
- Bustin' Out of L Seven (1979)
- Fire It Up (1979)
- Garden of Love (1980)
- Street Songs (1981)
- Throwin' Down (1982)
- Cold Blooded (1983)
- Glow (1985)
- The Flag (1986)
- Wonderful (1988)
- Kickin' (1989)
- Urban Rapsody (1997)
- Deeper Still (2007)

== Bibliography ==
- Benjaminson, Peter (2017). Super Freak: The Life of Rick James. Chicago Review Press. ISBN 978-1-613-74957-9.
- Denisof, R. Serge (1988). Inside MTV. Transaction Publishers. ISBN 978-0-88738-864-4.
- Durchholz, Daniel (2010). Neil Young: Long May You Run: The Illustrated History, Updated Edition. Voyageur Press. ISBN 978-1-610-60453-6.
- James, Rick (2014). Glow: The Autobiography of Rick James. Atria Books. ISBN 978-1-4767-6416-0.
