= 20th Century Masters – The Millennium Collection: The Best of The Jets =

Greatest hits album by The Jets
- Released: October 9, 2001
- Recorded: 1985–1990
- Genre: Pop; R&B
- Label: MCA
- Producer: Vassal Benford, D'LaVance, David Z, Don Powell, Aaron Zigman, Jerry Knight, Michael Verdick, Rick Kelly, Bobby Nunn, Leroy Wolfgramm, Denny Diante, & Stephen Bray

The Jets chronology
Then & Now (1998)	20th Century Masters – The Millennium Collection: The Best of The Jets (2001)	Greatest Hits (2004)

20th Century Masters – The Millennium Collection: The Best of The Jets is the second greatest hits album by Tongan-American family band The Jets, released on October 9, 2001, by MCA Records.

This album contains many of their biggest hits, including "Crush on You", "Sendin' All My Love", "You Got It All", "Rocket 2 U", "Cross My Broken Heart" and "Make It Real". The only singles this package omits are "Anytime", "Christmas in My Heart", "Somebody to Love Me", and "Under Any Moon".

== Track listing ==
1. "Crush on You" – 4:30
2. "Private Number" – 4:03
3. "You Got It All" – 4:08
4. "Curiosity" – 4:58
5. "Cross My Broken Heart" – 4:07
6. "I Do You" – 3:38
7. "Rocket 2 U" – 4:18
8. "Make It Real" – 4:17
9. "Sendin' All My Love" – 3:49
10. "You Better Dance" – 3:51
11. "The Same Love" – 3:58
12. "Special Kinda Love" – 4:33
