= The Best of The Jets =

Greatest hits album by The Jets
- Released: July 13, 1990
- Recorded: 1985–1990
- Studio: 62:17
- Genres: Pop; R&B; dance-pop
- Label: MCA
- Producers: Vassal Benford; D'LaVance; David Z; Don Powell; Aaron Zigman; Jerry Knight; Michael Verdick; Rick Kelly; Bobby Nunn; Leroy Wolfgramm; Denny Diante; Stephen Bray

The Jets chronology
Believe (1989)	The Best of The Jets (1990)	Love People (1995)

Singles from The Best of The Jets
- 1. "Special Kinda Love" Released: August 19, 1990; 2. "Forever in My Life" Released: November 28, 1990

The Best of The Jets is the first compilation album by Tongan-American family band The Jets, released by MCA Records on June 13, 1990. The album features four new songs and a selection of their greatest hits from 1985 to 1987.

== Track listing ==
No.	Title	Writer(s)	Original release	Length
1.	"Special Kinda Love"	Vassal Benford; Ron Spearman	New recording	4:32
2.	"Forever in My Life"	Benford; Spearman	New recording	5:15
3.	"Crush on You"	Jerry Knight; Aaron Zigman	The Jets, 1985	4:31
4.	"Curiosity"	Knight; Zigman	The Jets	4:58
5.	"Sendin' All My Love"	Stephen Bray; Linda Mallah	Magic, 1987	4:32
6.	"You Got It All"	Rupert Holmes	The Jets	4:09
7.	"Rocket 2 U"	Bobby Nunn	Magic	4:18
8.	"Sendin' Out a Message"	Antonina Armato; Rick Neigher	New recording	4:00
9.	"La-La (Means I Love You)" (The Delfonics cover) (1990 remix)	Thom Bell; William Hart	The Jets	3:50
10.	"Cross My Broken Heart"	Bray; Tony Pierce	Magic	4:07
11.	"Another You"	Armato; Ian Prince	New recording	4:25
12.	"Make It Real"	Mallah; Rick Kelly; Don Powell	Magic	4:18
13.	"Special Kinda Love" (Vogue extended club version)	Benford; Spearman	New recording	9:00
Total length:				62:17

1996 Japanese release
No.	Title	Writer(s)	Original release	Length
1.	"Special Kinda Love"	Benford; Spearman	New recording	4:32
2.	"Forever in My Life"	Benford; Spearman	New recording	5:15
3.	"Crush on You"	Knight; Zigman	The Jets	4:31
4.	"Curiosity"	Knight; Zigman	The Jets	4:58
5.	"You Got It All"	Holmes	The Jets	4:09
6.	"Private Number"	Knight; Zigman	The Jets	4:03
7.	"La-La (Means I Love You)" (1990 remix)	Bell; Hart	The Jets	3:50
8.	"Cross My Broken Heart"	Bray; Pierce	Magic	4:07
9.	"I Do You"	Mallah; Kelly	Magic	3:38
10.	"Rocket 2 U"	Nunn	Magic	4:18
11.	"Somewhere Out There" (Linda Rondstadt and James Ingram cover)	James Horner; Barry Mann; Cynthia Weil	Christmas with The Jets, 1986	3:42
12.	"Sendin' All My Love"	Malah; Bray	Magic	4:32
13.	"Another You"	Armato; Prince	New recording	4:25
14.	"Make It Real"	Mallah; Kelly; Powell	Magic	4:18
15.	"Sendin' Out a Message"	Armato; Neigher	New recording	4:00
16.	"Anytime"	Holmes	Magic	3:52
17.	"Special Kinda Love" (Vogue extended club version)	Benford; Spearman	New recording	9:00

== Personnel ==
The Jets

- Elizabeth Wolfgramm – vocals, percussion
- Moana Wolfgramm – vocals, percussion
- Kathi Wolfgramm – keyboards, vocals
- Leroy Wolfgramm – keyboards, guitars, percussion, vocals
- Eddie Wolfgramm – keyboards, drums, percussion, tenor saxophone, vocals
- Haini Wolfgramm – bass, vocals
- Rudy Wolfgramm – drums, vocals, choreography
- Eugene Wolfgramm – percussion, vocals

Additional musicians

- Vassal Benford – all instruments (1, 2), programming (1, 2), arrangements (1, 2), vocal arrangements (1, 2)
- Randy Waldman – programming (8), arrangements (8)
- Ian Prince – programming (11), arrangements (11)
- Neal Pogue – drum programming (1)
- Ron Spearman – drum programming (1), vocal arrangements (1, 2)

== Singles released ==
- "Special Kinda Love" – #83 US R&B
