= Then & Now (The Jets album) =

Studio album by The Jets
- Released: August 25, 1998
- Recorded: 1998
- Studio: Public Recording (Brea, California)
- Genre: Pop, dance-pop, R&B
- Length: 68:11
- Label: Cold Front
- Producer: Leroy Wolfgramm

The Jets chronology
Love Will Lead the Way (1997)	Then & Now (1998)	20th Century Masters – Millennium Collection (2001)

Then & Now is the seventh studio album by Tongan-American family band The Jets, released on August 25, 1998, by Cold Front.

At this point, the band only had four of the original members remaining but also had three new members, all younger siblings of the older members. It features three new songs: "That's Why God Made the Moon", "The Truth", and "Sacrifice". 9 of the 12 tracks included are re-recordings of songs that were originally recorded on previously released albums. The album did not sell nearly as well as their previous efforts, with only around 50,000 copies sold to date.

== Track listing ==
1. "Curiosity" (Jerry Knight, Aaron Zigman) – 4:43
2. "Crush on You" (Jerry Knight, Aaron Zigman) – 4:16
3. "Make It Real" (Rick Kelly, Linda Mallah, Don Powell) – 4:20
4. "Rocket 2 U" (Bobby Nunn) – 4:19
5. "Cross My Broken Heart" (Stephen Bray, Tony Pierce) – 4:08
6. "You Got It All" (Rupert Holmes) – 4:22
7. "I Do You" (Rick Kelly, Linda Mallah) – 3:37
8. "No Time To Lose" (Elizabeth Wolfgramm, Leroy Wolfgramm) – 3:33
9. "That's Why God Made the Moon" (John Elefante, Dino Elefante) – 4:28
10. "The Truth" (Cathy Massey, Claire Massey, Mark Jiaras, Mike Chapman, Tommy Gawenda) – 4:02
11. "Ooh Baby" (Elizabeth Wolfgramm, Leroy Wolfgramm) – 3:55
12. "Sacrifice" (Mike Chapman) – 3:31

NOTE: Tracks 1–8 and 11 are re-recordings and are not the original versions, tracks 9, 10 and 12 are new and original tracks that are not on past albums and were released for the first time on this album

== Personnel ==
The Jets

- Elizabeth Wolfgramm – vocals (1–3, 6, 11), backing vocals (8)
- Moana Wolfgramm – vocals (2, 5, 7–11), backing vocals (8)
- Leroy Wolfgramm – keyboard programming, drum programming, MIDI programming, guitars (1, 3, 5–7), backing vocals (4, 8), instrumental arrangements (9, 11, 12), music arrangements (10), vocals (12)
- Haini Wolfgramm – bass (3, 6, 9), vocals (4), backing vocals (8)

Additional musicians

- Matthew Neely – acoustic piano (9)
- Kipp Hotzinger – guitars (9, 10)
- Keith Harleson – drums (9)
- Steve Hommel – saxophone (6)
- Donnie Wolfgramm – backing vocals (6)
- Mali Wolfgramm – backing vocals (6)
- Mika Wolfgramm – backing vocals (6)
- Natalia Wolfgramm – backing vocals (6)

=== Production ===
- Leroy Wolfgramm – producer, mixing
- David Longeuay – recording, mixing, mastering
- Tony Alvarez – assistant engineer
- Suba – assistant engineer
- Megan McGinley – art direction
- William Rich – photography
- Julia Knapp – hair, make-up
- Rudy Wolfgramm –management
