= Greatest Hits (The Jets album) =

Greatest hits album by The Jets
- Released: August 8, 2004
- Recorded: 1998
- Genre: Pop, dance-pop, R&B
- Label: K-tel

The Jets chronology
20th Century Masters – Millennium Collection (2001)	Greatest Hits (2004)	Versatility (2006)

Greatest Hits is the third greatest hits album by Tongan-American family band The Jets, released on August 8, 2004, by K-tel International, Inc. All songs included are from the Then & Now album with a slightly modified title, a slightly different track listing and a different album cover. Thus, it isn't a traditional greatest hits album, but rather a compilation of 7 re-recordings, along with 1 newer track that were originally recorded for 𝘛𝘩𝘦𝘯 & 𝘕𝘰𝘸. It was rated two stars by AllMusic.

== Track listing ==
1. "Curiosity" (Jerry Knight, Aaron Zigman) – 4:43
2. "Crush on You" (Jerry Knight, Aaron Zigman) – 4:16
3. "Make It Real" (Rick Kelly, Linda Mallah, Don Powell) – 4:20
4. "Rocket 2 U" (Bobby Nunn) – 4:19
5. "Cross My Broken Heart" (Stephen Bray, Tommy Pierce) – 4:08
6. "You Got It All" (Rupert Holmes) – 4:22
7. "I Do You" (Rick Kelly, Linda Mallah) – 3:37
8. "That's Why God Made the Moon" (John Elefante) – 4:28
