= Stephen E. Rivkin =

American film editor

Stephen E. Rivkin ACE
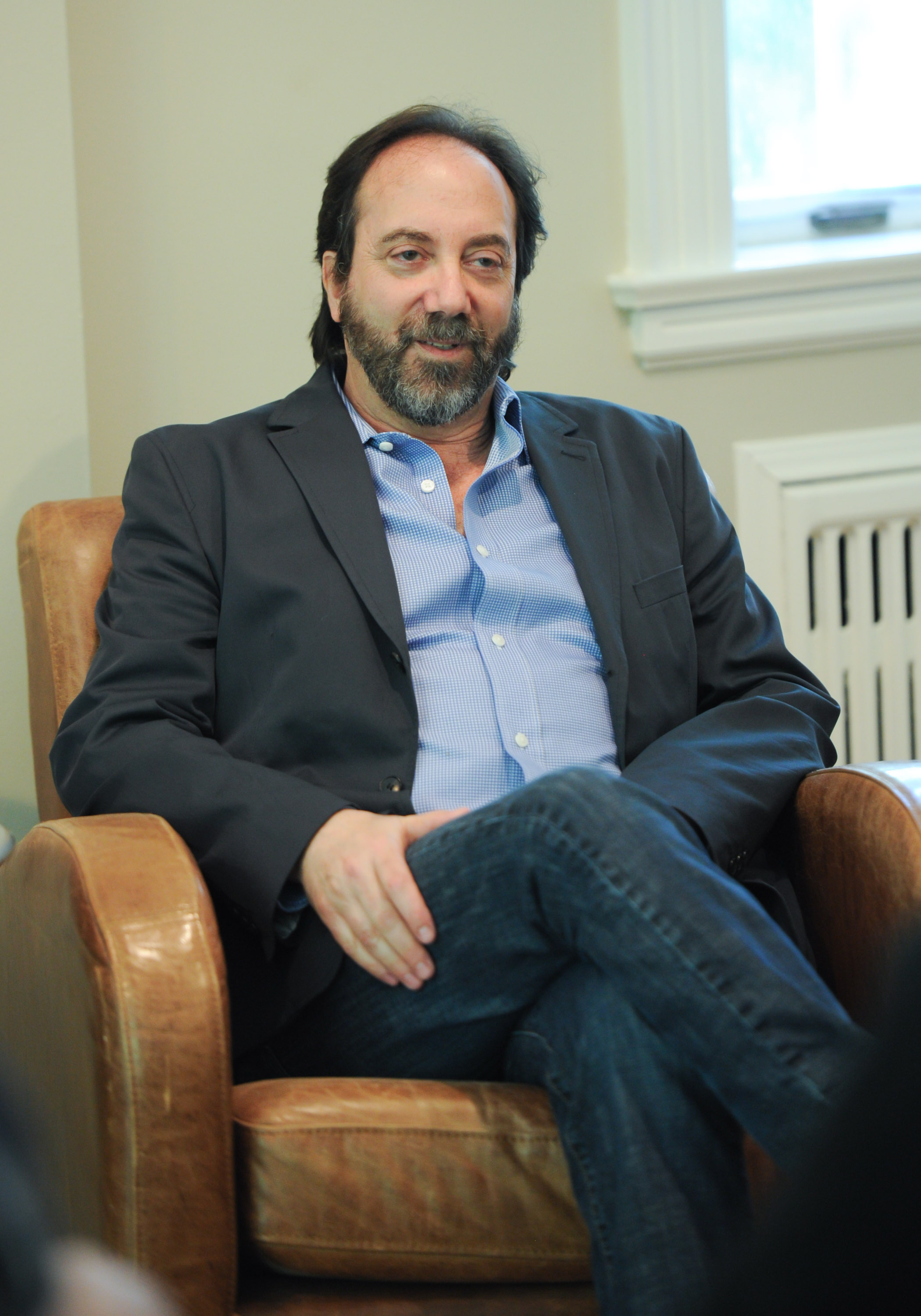
- Rivkin in 2013
- Born: Stephen Elliot Rivkin; May 5, 1955 (age 71); Minneapolis, Minnesota, US
- Education: Minneapolis College of Art and Design
- Occupations: Film editor, music video director
- Notable work: Avatar: Creating the World of Pandora (2010 Documentary / Short)
- Spouse: Dina Morrone
- Relatives: Bobby Z., David Z (brothers)

Stephen Elliot Rivkin (born May 5, 1955) is an American film editor and music video director. He is best known for his editing work on the Pirates of the Caribbean film series as well as his work with director James Cameron as an editor on Avatar, for which he was nominated for an Academy Award. Rivkin has edited four films for director Norman Jewison; Rivkin has worked on three films with director Gore Verbinski. He continues to work on the Avatar franchise for director James Cameron. Rivkin is an elected member of the American Cinema Editors and is a former president of the organization. He was also associate producer on two films.

== Early life ==
Rivkin graduated in 1975 from the Minneapolis College of Art and Design.

== Personal life ==
Rivkin's brothers are musicians Bobby Z. and David Z.

He is married to Dina Morrone who is a voiceover actor, playwright, actress, and executive editor and contributing writer for The Eden Magazine.

== Selected filmography ==
Year	Title	Director	Notes
1982	The Personals	Peter Markle	—N/a
1984	Hot Dog…The Movie	Peter Markle	—N/a
1986	Youngblood	Peter Markle	—N/a
1986	Band of the Hand	Paul Michael Glaser	—N/a
1987	Stranded	Fleming B. Fuller	—N/a
1988	Bat*21	Peter Markle	—N/a
1989	Nightbreaker	Peter Markle	Television film
1990	El Diablo	Peter Markle	Television film
1991	Run	Geoff Burrowes	Co-edited with Jack Hofstra
1991	Wildflower	Diane Keaton	Television film
1992	My Cousin Vinny	Jonathan Lynn	—N/a
1992	The Comrades of Summer	Tommy Lee Wallace	Television film
1993	Fire in the Sky	Robert Lieberman	—N/a
1993	Robin Hood: Men in Tights	Mel Brooks	—N/a
1994	Only You	Norman Jewison	—N/a
1995	Outbreak	Wolfgang Petersen	Co-edited with Lynzee Klingman, Neil Travis, and William Hoy
1995	Nine Months	Chris Columbus	Co-edited with Raja Gosnell
1996	Bogus	Norman Jewison	—N/a
1996	The Last Days of Frankie the Fly	Peter Markle	—N/a
1997	Excess Baggage	Marco Brambilla	—N/a
1999	Idle Hands	Rodman Flender	—N/a
1999	The Hurricane	Norman Jewison	—N/a
2001	Swordfish	Dominic Sena	—N/a
2001	Wooly Boys	Leszek Burzynski	Co-edited with Andrew S. Eisen
2001	Ali	Michael Mann	Co-edited with Lynzee Klingman, Stuart Waks, and William Goldenberg
2003	Pirates of the Caribbean: The Curse of the Black Pearl	Gore Verbinski	Co-edited with Arthur Schmidt, and Craig Wood; Credited as Stephen Rivkin
2003	The Statement	Norman Jewison	Co-edited with Andrew S. Eisen
2005	Stealth	Rob Cohen	—N/a
2006	Pirates of the Caribbean: Dead Man's Chest	Gore Verbinski	Co-edited with Craig Wood; Credited as Stephen Rivkin
2007	Pirates of the Caribbean: At World's End	Gore Verbinski	Co-edited with Craig Wood; Credited as Stephen Rivkin
2009	Avatar	James Cameron	Co-edited with John Refoua and James Cameron; Credited as Stephen Rivkin
2014	Exodus: Gods and Kings	Ridley Scott	—N/a
2015	Blackhat	Michael Mann	Co-edited with Jeremiah O'Driscoll, Joe Walker, and Mako Kamitsuna
2015	Fantastic Four	Josh Trank	Co-edited with Elliot Greenberg; Credited as Stephen Rivkin
2019	Alita: Battle Angel	Robert Rodriguez	Co-edited with Ian Silverstein
2022	Avatar: The Way of Water	James Cameron	Co-edited with David Brenner, John Refoua, and James Cameron; Credited as Stephen Rivkin
2025	Avatar: Fire and Ash	James Cameron	Co-edited with Nicolas de Toth, John Refoua, Jason Gaudio, David Brenner and James Cameron; Credited as Stephen Rivkin

== Music videos ==
Year	Song	Artist	Ref(s)
1985	"Curiosity"	The Jets	
1986	"Crush on You"	The Jets	
1986	"Private Number"	The Jets	
1986	"You Got It All"	The Jets	
1986	"Christmas In My Heart"	The Jets	
1987	"I Do You"	The Jets	

== Awards and nominations ==
- 2010 - Academy Award Nomination "Film Editing" - Avatar (shared with editors John Refoua and editor/director James Cameron)
- 2010 - BAFTA Award Nomination "Film Editing" - Avatar (shared with editors John Refoua and editor/director James Cameron)
- 2010 - American Cinema Editors Nomination "Film Editing" Feature Film (Dramatic) - Avatar (shared with editors John Refoua and editor/director James Cameron)
- 2008 - American Cinema Editors Nomination "Film Editing" Feature Film - Comedy or Musical - Pirates of the Caribbean: At World's End
- 2007 - American Cinema Editors Nomination "Film Editing" Feature Film - Comedy or Musical - Pirates of the Caribbean: Dead Man's Chest
- 2004 - American Cinema Editors Winner "Best Edited Feature Film" - Comedy or Musical - Pirates of the Caribbean: The Curse of the Black Pearl
