= Reunited (The Jets album) =

Studio album by The Jets
- Released: January 15, 2014
- Recorded: 2013
- Genre: Pop, dance-pop, R&B
- Label: Refinement Records
- Producer: Craig Poole, Junior Fenga, Joseph Gileadi, Tony Uesi, LeRoy Wolfgramm

The Jets chronology
Greatest Hits Live (2007)	Reunited (2014)

Professional ratings
Review scores
Source	Rating
Allmusic	2.5/5 stars

Reunited is the ninth studio album by Tongan-American family band The Jets, released on January 15, 2014, by Refinement Records. As of July 2025, it is their most recent release.

Reunited features six new songs, as well as four re-recordings of these past hits: "Cross My Broken Heart", "Make It Real", "Crush on You", and "You Got It All" At this point, the band was composed of Eddie, Elizabeth, Haini, Kathi, Leroy, Moana, Natalia and Rudy Wolfgramm.

== Track listing ==
1. "Cross My Broken Heart" - 3:56
2. "Make It Real" - 3:47
3. "Pass Me By" (EtiVise Epenisa, Tony Usei) - 4:04
4. "So Cool" (Anthony Green, Joslyn Petty, Craig Poole, Rob Wannamaker) - 4:10
5. "Take My Hand" (Junior Feinga, Moana Feinga) - 3:53
6. "Crush on You" - 3:54
7. "You Got It All" - 4:14
8. "Pride" (EtiVise Epenisa, Moana Feinga, Craig Poole, Tony Usei, Natalia Wolfgramm, Tiare Wolfgramm) - 4:26
9. "Believe in Love" (Analea Brown, Sharif Colbert, Joseph Fotu, Gregory Reid) - 4:23
10. "Don't" (Junior Feinga, Moana Feinga, Aaron Watene) - 3:20

== Personnel ==
The Jets

- Elizabeth Wolfgramm Atuaia – lead vocals, backing vocals
- Moana Wolfgramm Feinga – lead vocals, backing vocals, vocal arrangements
- Natalia Wolfgramm – lead vocals, backing vocals, vocal arrangements
- Leroy Wolfgramm – guitars, acoustic guitars
- Eddie Lavatai – bongos
- Kathi Wolfgramm
- Haini Wolfgramm
- Rudy Wolfgramm

Additional musicians

- Craig Poole – synthesizers, programming, synthesizer programming, guitars, acoustic guitars, bass, drum programming, vocal arrangements
- Courtney Smith – acoustic piano
- Rob Wannamaker – acoustic piano, synthesizers, drums
- Joe Gilesdi – synthesizer programming, drum programming
- James Waddell – synthesizers, drums
- Thomas Hopkins – guitars, acoustic guitars
- Marty Lyman – guitars, acoustic guitars
- Nioshi Jackson – drums
- David Halliday – saxophones
- Tom E. Politzer – saxophones
- Mic Gillette – trombone, trumpet
- Dave Eskridge – horn arrangements
- Junior Feinga – vocal arrangements
- Joslyn Petty – backing vocals
- Mika Wolfgramm – backing vocals
