= Beverly Hills Cop II (soundtrack) =

Beverly Hills Cop II: The Motion Picture Soundtrack Album

Soundtrack album by various artists
- Released: May 18, 1987
- Length: 45:14
- Label: MCA Records
- Producers: Don Simpson (exec.); Jerry Bruckheimer (exec.); André Cymone; Giorgio Moroder; Keith Forsey; George Michael; Harold Faltermeyer; Howie Rice; Michael Verdick; Narada Michael Walden; Ready for the World; Stephen Bray

Singles from Beverly Hills Cop II
- 1. "Shakedown" Released: May 1987; 2. "I Want Your Sex" Released: May 1987; 3. "Cross My Broken Heart" Released: May 1987

Professional ratings
Review scores
| Source | Rating |
|---|---|
| AllMusic | 3/5 stars |

Beverly Hills Cop II: The Motion Picture Soundtrack Album is the soundtrack to Tony Scott's 1987 action comedy film Beverly Hills Cop II. It was released in 1987 through MCA Records. Composed of eleven songs, production was handled by André Cymone, Giorgio Moroder, Keith Forsey, George Michael, Harold Faltermeyer, Howie Rice, Michael Verdick, Narada Michael Walden, Ready for the World and Stephen Bray.

The song "Hold On" as sung by Keta Bill plays during the scene wherein Axel, Rosewood and Taggart confront Dent at the Playboy Mansion. However, the film's soundtrack CD released by MCA Records includes only a different song entitled "Hold On", sung by Corey Hart. This song has different music and slightly altered lyrics. The film introduced George Michael's controversial song "I Want Your Sex", a number 2 hit on the Billboard Hot 100. It also includes "Cross My Broken Heart" by The Jets (a Top 10 hit on the Billboard Hot 100) and "Shakedown" by Bob Seger (which became a No. 1 hit on that same chart), as well as "Better Way" performed by James Ingram. The Pointer Sisters scored a moderate hit with "Be There" (42 on the Hot 100), their single from the soundtrack. It was the second time the sisters had contributed to the Beverly Hills Cop franchise; they'd notched a top 10 single with "Neutron Dance" from the Beverly Hills Cop soundtrack. Harold Faltermeyer's 1988 album, Harold F, includes a song called "Bad Guys", which is used as part of the film's score—an instrumental section of the song plays during the opening jewelry store robbery scene, and also during several other scenes throughout the film.

The soundtrack debuted at No. 8 on the Billboard 200 albums chart and spent 26 weeks on the charts. One song from the album, "Shakedown", was nominated for an Academy Award and the Golden Globe Award for Best Original Song. However, another song from the album, "I Want Your Sex", won the Razzie Award for Worst Song, despite it going on to achieve a platinum certification for sales by the Recording Industry Association of America.

== Track listing ==
| No. | Title | Writer(s) | Producer(s) | Length |
|---|---|---|---|---|
| 1. | "Shakedown" (performed by Bob Seger) | Bob Seger; Keith Forsey; Harold Faltermeyer | Harold Faltermeyer; Keith Forsey | 4:01 |
| 2. | "Be There" (performed by The Pointer Sisters) | Allee Willis; Franne Golde | Narada Michael Walden | 4:17 |
| 3. | "In Deep" (performed by Charlie Sexton) | Charlie Sexton; Scott Wilk | Keith Forsey | 3:34 |
| 4. | "Hold On" (performed by Corey Hart) | James Wirrick | Giorgio Moroder | 3:46 |
| 5. | "I Want Your Sex" (performed by George Michael) | George Michael | George Michael | 4:47 |
| 6. | "Better Way" (performed by James Ingram) | André Cymone | André Cymone | 4:10 |
| 7. | "Love/Hate" (performed by Pebbles) | André Cymone; Julian Jackson | André Cymone | 4:02 |
| 8. | "Cross My Broken Heart" (performed by The Jets) | Stephen Bray; Tony Pierce | Michael Verdick; Stephen Bray | 4:12 |
| 9. | "36 Lovers" (performed by Ready for the World) | Gary Spaniola; John Eaton; Melvin Riley Jr. | Ready for the World | 4:19 |
| 10. | "I Can't Stand It" (performed by Sue Ann Carwell) | David Allen Jones; Harold Payne | Howie Rice | 4:04 |
| 11. | "All Revved Up" (performed by Jermaine Jackson) | Giorgio Moroder; Tom Whitlock | Giorgio Moroder | 4:02 |
| Total length: | | | | 45:14 |

== Official score album ==
In 2016, La-La Land Records issued a limited edition album featuring the score from the movie composed by Harold Faltermeyer as well as the notable songs from the movie.

1. "Adrianos" (2:52)
2. "Bogomil Oil Well Jog / Bogomil Gets Shot" (2:28)
3. "Axel Gets the News" (1:10)
4. "Warehouse" (0:34)
5. "Hospital Visit" (1:05)
6. "Mansion" (1:07)
7. "Loyalty / Drive to Shooting Club" (1:51)
8. "Boys Car Talk" (1:11)
9. "Shoot Screens / Meet Dent and Cain" (2:53)
10. "I'll Be Sure to Duck" (0:54)
11. "Drive to Bogomil's" (0:58)
12. "Axel Shoes / Boys at Mansion" (1:24)
13. "Splash / Drive to 385" (0:41)
14. "Shootout" (0:53)
15. "Boys at Rosewood's" (0:42)
16. "Axel Calls Jeffrey" (1:01)
17. "Fingerprint" (0:27)
18. "Sneak to Shooting Club" (2:33)
19. "Jeffrey Calls Todd / Lutz Calls Jeffrey" (1:29)
20. "City Deposit" (4:12)
21. "The Tread to Hef's / Drive to Bernstein's" (theme suite) (1:44)
22. "Racetrack" (5:04)
23. "Drive to Oil / Hit Vic" (2:25)
24. "Sneak to Shack / Alarm" (1:44)
25. "Oil Field Shootout / Kill Dent and Karla" (4:11)
26. "Wrap Up" (0:56)
27. "Goodbye" (1:11)
28. "Loyalty" (alternate) (0:12)
29. "Bad Guys" - Keith Forsey (4:35)
30. "Shakedown" - Bob Seger (4:02)
31. "I Want Your Sex" - George Michael (4:45)
32. "The Heat is On" - Glenn Frey (3:45)
33. "Be There" - The Pointer Sisters (4:12)
34. "All Revved Up" - Jermaine Jackson (4:00)
35. "Better Way" - James Ingram (4:09)
36. "In Deep" - Charlie Sexton (3:32)

== Charts ==
=== Weekly charts ===
| Chart (1987) | Peak position |
|---|---|
| Australia (Kent Music Report) | 22 |
| Canada Top Albums/CDs (RPM) | 5 |
| German Albums (Offizielle Top 100) | 37 |
| New Zealand Albums (RMNZ) | 26 |
| Swedish Albums (Sverigetopplistan) | 19 |
| Swiss Albums (Schweizer Hitparade) | 17 |
| UK Albums (Official Charts) | 71 |
| US Billboard 200 | 8 |
| US Top R&B Albums (Billboard) | 36 |

=== Year-end charts ===
| Chart (1987) | Position |
|---|---|
| Canada Top Albums/CDs (RPM) | 18 |
| US Billboard 200 | 69 |

== Certifications ==
| Region | Certification | Certified units/sales |
|---|---|---|
| Canada (Music Canada) | Platinum | 100,000^{^} |
| United States (RIAA) | Platinum | 1,000,000^{^} |
^{^} Shipments figures based on certification alone.
