= Magic (The Jets album) =

Studio album by the Jets
- Released: 1987
- Recorded: December 1986 – July 1987
- Studios: Conway, The Sound Factory and Sunset Sound (Hollywood, California); Monterey and Yamaha R&D (Glendale, California); Lighthouse (Studio City, California); Monday to Sunday (Burbank, California); The Hit Factory, 29th Street Music and Blank Tape (New York City, New York); Sammy Fields (Demarest, New Jersey); Westwood (Minneapolis, Minnesota)
- Genres: Pop; dance-pop
- Length: 40:55
- Label: MCA
- Producers: Michael Verdick; Rick Kelly; Tom Keane; Don Powell; Lotti Golden; Tommy Faragher; Bobby Nunn; Rupert Holmes; Stephen Bray

The Jets chronology
Christmas with The Jets (1986)	Magic (1987)	Believe (1989)

Singles from Magic
- 1. "Cross My Broken Heart" Released: May 20, 1987; 2. "I Do You" Released: October 19, 1987; 3. "Rocket 2 U" Released: January 14, 1988; 4. "Make It Real" Released: April 13, 1988; 5. "Sendin' All My Love" Released: August 1, 1988; 6. "Anytime" Released: October 6, 1988

Magic is the third studio album by Tongan-American family band the Jets, released in 1987 by MCA Records. It was the first album without Eugene Wolfgramm, who left the group to form Boys Club.

The album spawned multiple hit singles. "Cross My Broken Heart" also appeared on the soundtrack to Beverly Hills Cop II.

The album included their first US dance chart number 1 hit "Sendin' All My Love", as well as "Make It Real", which stayed at the top of the adult contemporary chart for 4 weeks and cracked the top five on the US pop chart, peaking at number 4. "Rocket 2 U" was also another hit from the album, reaching number 6 on the Hot 100.

The album reached number 35 in the U.S. It was certified Gold.

== Critical reception ==
Professional ratings
Review scores
Source	Rating
AllMusic	4/5 stars
The Encyclopedia of Popular Music	3/5 stars
Los Angeles Times	2.5/4 stars
The Philadelphia Inquirer	3/4 stars
The Rolling Stone Album Guide	1.5/5 stars

AllMusic wrote that the album "stands apart simply because, for all of its timeless appeal, it is remindful of youth without seeming juvenile—a formula few pop artists ever seem to master." The Christian Science Monitor thought that the band "work the same punchy dance grooves—but with an added touch of sophistication this time."

== Track listing ==
Side one
No.	Title	Writer(s)	Producer(s)	Length
1.	"I Do You"	Linda Mallah; Rick Kelly	Michael Verdick; Kelly	3:37
2.	"The Only Dance"	Tom Keane; Michael Himelstein	Keane	4:35
3.	"Believe It or Not, It's Magic"	Bernard Jackson; David Townsend; David Conley	Don Powell; Lotti Golden; Tommy Faragher	3:50
4.	"Make It Real"	Powell; Mallah; Verdick; Kelly	Powell; Verdick; Kelly	4:11
5.	"Rocket 2 U"	Bobby Nunn	Nunn	4:17

Side two
No.	Title	Writer(s)	Producer(s)	Length
1.	"Sendin' All My Love"	Malah; Stephen Bray	Verdick; Kelly	3:30
2.	"Anytime"	Rupert Holmes	Powell; Holmes	3:50
3.	"When You're Young and in Love" (The Marvelettes cover)	Van McCoy	Powell; Golden; Faragher	4:25
4.	"First Time in Love"	Duncan Payne; Gerry Stober	Golden; Faragher	4:05
5.	"Cross My Broken Heart"	Bray; Tony Pierce	Verdick; Bray	4:08
Total length:				40:55

== Personnel ==
The Jets

- Kathi Wolfgramm
- Elizabeth Wolfgramm
- Moana Wolfgramm
- Leroy Wolfgramm
- Rudy Wolfgramm
- Eddie Wolfgramm
- Haini Wolfgramm

Musicians

- Rick Kelly – keyboards (1, 4, 6, 7), programming (1, 4, 7)
- Tom Keane – keyboards (2)
- Rhett Lawrence – programming (2), bass (2)
- Tommy Faragher – keyboards (3, 8, 9), programming (3, 8, 9)
- Lotti Golden – keyboards (3, 8, 9), programming (3, 8, 9)
- Bobby Nunn – instruments (5)
- Stephen Bray – other instruments (6), instruments (10)
- Richard Feldman – guitars (1)
- Michael Landau – guitars (2, 4)
- Ira Siegel – guitars (3, 8, 9)
- Dann Huff – guitars (6, 10)
- T.M. Stevens – bass (4, 7–9)
- John Keane – drum programming (2)
- Jimmy Bralower – drum programming (3, 8, 9)
- Art Wood – drums (7)
- Paulinho da Costa – percussion (1–3, 7, 9)
- Lincoln Adler – saxophone (7)

Arrangements

- Stephen Bray (instrumental and vocal)
- Tommy Faragher (instrumental)
- Lotti Golden (instrumental)
- Rupert Holmes (instrumental)
- Tom Keane (instrumental and vocal)
- Rick Kelly (instrumental)
- Bobby Nunn (instrumental and vocal)
- Don Powell (vocal)
- Michael Verdick (instrumental and vocal)
- Leroy Wolfgramm (vocal)

Production

- Don Powell – executive producer, producer (3, 4, 7), direction
- Michael Verdick – producer (1, 4, 6, 10), principle engineer, mixing (1, 6, 10)
- Tom Keane – producer (2)
- Tommy Faragher – producer (3, 8, 9)
- Lotti Golden – producer (3, 8, 9)
- Rick Kelly – producer (4, 6)
- Bobby Nunn – producer (5)
- Rupert Holmes – co-producer (7)
- Stephen Bray – producer (10)
- Coke Johnson – principle engineer, mixing (2–4, 7–9)
- Lance McVickar – principle engineer
- Barney Perkins – mixing (5), additional engineer
- Jimmy Preziosi – assistant engineer
- Dennis Wall – assistant engineer
- Andrea Bella – additional engineer
- Sue Fischer – additional engineer
- Jim Johnson – additional engineer
- Mike Kloster – additional engineer
- David Knight – additional engineer
- Marc Paul Leonard – additional engineer
- Ray Pyle – additional engineer
- Brian Soucy – additional engineer
- Roger Talkov – additional engineer
- Al Theurer – additional engineer
- Jeffrey "Woody" Woodruff – additional engineer
- Steve Hall – mastering at Future Disc (Hollywood, California)
- Dale Wehlacz – art direction, design, back cover artwork
- Stafford Wehlacz – photo illustrations
- Stafford – additional photography
- Annette Zeglen – hair, make-up
- David Maderich – wardrobe stylist

== Singles released ==
1. "Cross My Broken Heart" – Pop number 7 / R&B number 11 / Dance number 8
2. "I Do You" – Pop number 20 / R&B number 19
3. "Rocket 2 U" – Pop number 6 / R&B number 5 / Dance number 3
4. "Make It Real" – Pop number 4 / R&B number 24 / AC number 1 / Year Ending (1988) 51
5. "Sendin' All My Love" – Pop number 88 / R&B number 72 / Dance number 1
6. "Anytime" – AC number 35 / R&B number 98
