= Reunited =

Reunited may refer to:

== Music ==
- Reunited Tour, a 2004 concert tour by Judas Priest

=== Albums ===
- Reunited (Gaither Vocal Band album), 2009
- Reunited (Gloria Jones album), 1982
- Reunited (Highway 101 album), 1996
- Reunited (The Jets album), 2014
- Reunited (Mafikizolo album), 2013
- Reunited – Cliff Richard and The Shadows, 2014

=== Songs ===
- "Reunited" (song), by Peaches & Herb, 1979
- "Reunited", by Wu-Tang Clan from Wu-Tang Forever, 1997
- "Reunited", a track from the soundtrack of the 2015 video game Undertale by Toby Fox

== Television ==
- Reunited (New Zealand TV series), a 2022 New Zealand documentary series
- Reunited (TV pilot), a 2010 British television pilot
- Reunited (American TV series), a 1998 American sitcom
- Reunited: The Real World Las Vegas, a 2007 American reality series
- "Reunited" (Dawson's Creek), a 1999 episode
- "Reunited" (Steven Universe), two 2018 episodes
- "Reunited" (What We Do in the Shadows), a 2022 episode
- "Reunited" (RuPaul's Drag Race season 5), a 2013 episode
- "Reunited!" (RuPaul's Drag Race season 6), a 2014 episode
- "Reunited: Alone Together", a 2020 episode of RuPaul's Drag Race

== See also ==
- Reunited National Party (Herenigde Nasionale Party), a 1940s South African political party
- Reunited with Jimmy Webb 1974–1988, a 1999 album by Glen Campbell
