= Sweet Melody (disambiguation) =

"Sweet Melody" is a 2020 song by Little Mix.

Sweet Melody may also refer to:

- Sweet Melody, a 2010 album by Fiona Fung
- "Sweet Melody", a song by the Jets from the 1995 album Love People
- "Sweet Melody", a song by Zap Mama from the 2004 album Ancestry in Progress
