= Boys Club (duo) =

American pop duo

Boys Club was a pop duo consisting of Eugene Wolfgramm (Gene Hunt) and Joe Pasquale from Minneapolis, Minnesota and was created and put together by Don Hunter Powell. They had a big hit with "I Remember Holding You" in 1989, which peaked at #8 on the U.S. Billboard Hot 100. Upon the release of their debut album, the duo was compared to Wham! by Star Tribune music critic Jon Bream. "I Remember Holding You" was their only song to reach the Billboard Hot 100 Top 40, making them a one-hit wonder. Their second single, "The Loneliest Heart" peaked at #39 on the US Adult Contemporary chart a few months after "I Remember Holding You" had peaked at #4 on the same chart.

In radio interviews conducted during the height of their success, both Hunt and Pasquale stated that one of their primary musical influences was George Michael, and more specifically, the work Michael did during the Wham! years. "The way he arranged songs and melodies was quite unique and we tried to emulate that with our own music," Hunt was quoted as saying during one of those early interviews.

Boys Club was the first recording artist to appear on the All-New Mickey Mouse Club as a musical guest during the first episode.

Hunt was previously a member of the family group The Jets.

== Later years ==
In 1990, Hunt briefly reunited with The Jets to record four new tracks for The Best of The Jets (1990). He was featured on the cover and inside album sleeve and he appeared in the "Special Kinda Love" music video.

Hunt died on April 15, 2024.
