= The Jets (album) =

Studio album by the Jets
- Released: October 14, 1985
- Recorded: 1985
- Studios: Nicolett Studios (Minneapolis, Minnesota); The Sound Factory and Sunset Sound Recorders (Hollywood, California); Devonshire Sound Studios (North Hollywood, California)
- Genres: Pop; R&B; Minneapolis sound
- Length: 37:59
- Label: MCA
- Producers: David Z; Don Powell; Jerry Knight; Aaron Zigman; Joey Gallo; Wardell Potts

The Jets chronology
The Jets (1985)	Christmas with The Jets (1986)

Singles from The Jets
- 1. "Curiosity" Released: October 14, 1985; 2. "Crush on You" Released: March 12, 1986; 3. "Private Number" Released: April 7, 1986; 4. "You Got It All" Released: August 2, 1986

The Jets (released in the UK as Crush on You) is the debut studio album by Tongan-American family band the Jets, released on October 14, 1985, by MCA Records. The Jets gained airplay on MTV, VH1 and BET with the release of their first single "Curiosity". The song reached number 8 on the Billboard R&B singles chart.

The second single, "Crush on You", became their first song to chart on the Billboard Hot 100, peaking at number three. On the R&B singles chart, it reached number 4. The third single, "Private Number", peaked at number 47 on the Hot 100 and number 28 on the R&B chart. The fourth and final single was the ballad "You Got It All". It reached number 3 on the Hot 100, number 2 on the R&B chart, and number one on the Adult Contemporary chart.

The album peaked at number 21 on the U.S. pop albums chart and was certified Platinum by the RIAA.

== Track listing ==
All tracks are written by Jerry Knight and Aaron Zigman, except where noted.

Side one
No.	Title	Writer(s)	Lead vocals	Length
1.	"Curiosity"		Elizabeth	4:58
2.	"Crush on You"		Elizabeth and Moana	4:26
3.	"You Got It All"	Rupert Holmes	Elizabeth	4:05
4.	"Love Umbrella"		Eugene	4:33

Side two
No.	Title	Writer(s)	Lead vocals	Length
1.	"Private Number"		Elizabeth	4:03
2.	"Heart on the Line"		Eugene	3:34
3.	"Right Before My Eyes"		Rudy and Eugene	3:49
4.	"La-La (Means I Love You)" (The Delfonics cover)	Thom Bell; William Hart	Elizabeth and Rudy	3:48
5.	"Mesmerized"		Eugene	4:17
Total length:				37:59

== Personnel ==
The Jets

- Elizabeth Wolfgramm – vocals, keyboards, percussion
- Moana Wolfgramm – vocals, keyboards, percussion
- Kathi Wolfgramm – vocals, keyboards, percussion
- Leroy Wolfgramm – vocals, keyboards, guitars, percussion
- Haini Wolfgramm – vocals, keyboards, bass, percussion
- Eddie Wolfgramm – vocals, keyboards, drums, congas, tenor saxophone
- Rudy Wolfgramm – vocals, drums, percussion
- Eugene Wolfgramm – vocals, congas, percussion, alto saxophone

Musicians and arrangements

- Jerry Knight – keyboards, guitars, bass, drum programming, arrangements (1, 2, 4, 5), instrumental arrangements (8), vocal arrangements (8)
- Aaron Zigman – keyboards, arrangements (1, 2, 4, 5), instrumental arrangements (8)
- Ricky Peterson – keyboards, bass, drum programming, instrumental arrangements (3, 6, 7)
- Roger Dumas – keyboards
- Matt Fink – keyboards
- Joey Gallo – keyboards, arrangements (9)
- Jim Behringer – guitars
- Horace Coleman – guitars
- Paul Peterson – guitars, bass
- Bob Parr – bass
- David Rivkin – drum programming
- Wardell Potts – drum programming, arrangements (9)
- Brian Alexis – percussion
- Don Powell – percussion, vocal arrangements (3, 6–8)
- Rick O'Dell – tenor saxophone

Production

- Don Powell – producer (1–8), management, clothes styling
- David Rivkin – producer (1–8), engineer (1–7), mixing
- Jerry Knight – co-producer (1, 2, 4, 5, 8)
- Aaron Zigman – co-producer (1, 2, 4, 5, 8)
- Joey Gallo – producer (9)
- Wardell Potts – producer (9)
- Bob Brown – engineer (9)
- Jim Shifflett – engineer (9)
- John "Chopper" Black – assistant engineer (1–7)
- Steve Felstad – assistant engineer (1–7)
- Coke Johnson – assistant engineer (1–7), engineer (8)
- Paul Stark – assistant engineer (1–7)
- Steve Hall – mastering at Future Disc (Hollywood, California)
- Tom Lowe – photography
- Terra Andrews – hair, make-up
- Tim Olson – hair, make-up
- The Jets – clothes styling

== Charts ==
=== Weekly charts ===
Chart (1985–1986)	Peak position
New Zealand Albums (RMNZ)	33
US Billboard 200	21
US Top R&B/Hip-Hop Albums (Billboard)	16

=== Year-end charts ===
Chart (1986)	Position
US Billboard 200	64
US Top R&B Albums (Billboard)	17
