= Bob & Gene =

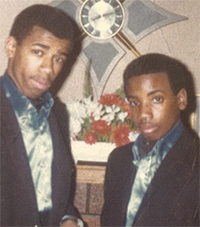

Background information
- Genres: R&B, pop, soul
- Occupations: Singers-songwriters record producers
- Instruments: Vocals, keyboards
- Years active: 1960s–1970s
- Labels: MoDo Records, Daptone

Bob & Gene is an American R&B, singing, songwriting, duo. The duo consists of Bobby Nunn and Eugene Coplin Jr. In 1967, in their home town of Buffalo, New York, the two teenagers started writing and recording original songs that were released locally on the MoDo records label.

== MoDo records ==
In the late 1960s, Bobby's father William Nunn started MoDo records as a way to make extra money and to give the neighborhood youth an outlet to learn the music business. MoDo's recording studio was located in the basement of the Nunn home on Orange Street in Buffalo. Bob and Gene spent most of their free time in that basement writing and recording songs. As Bobby says, "We’d see local bands that had one mission... to play cover songs in the local bars. We thought it would be so much cooler to do original music and to have our own songs on the radio." If they did cover songs, they did them their own way, often changing them totally. During this time they also recorded enough material for a full-length album. By the early 1970s MoDo Records had folded, so the album was never released.

== Daptone records ==
In the early 1970s, Bob and Gene went their separate ways and in very different directions. Gene went into the church and other community endeavors in Buffalo. Bobby worked with Rick James before moving to Los Angeles where he continued his music career with quite a bit of success. In 2001, New York soul music historian David Griffiths came across some rare Bob & Gene 45s. The label made reference to an upcoming album titled If This World Were Mine. After some intense searching and many phone calls to William Nunn Sr, Griffiths took the tapes of the unreleased album to Daptone Records. The album was released in 2007. Bob and Gene's songs have since been featured in movies like Why Did I Get Married Too?, Our Family Wedding, and Different from Whom?. In 2011, Bob and Gene were inducted into the Buffalo Music Hall of Fame.

== Possible reunion ==
Inspired by the life and saddened by the death of Sharon Jones, Bob and Gene have had discussions with each other and with Daptone about reuniting for some shows in the near future.
