= Love Will Lead the Way =

Studio album by The Jets
- Released: 1997
- Recorded: 1996–1997
- Studios: Poppi Studio (Nashville, Tennessee); Mountain Aire Studios (Salt Lake City, Utah)
- Genres: Pop, dance-pop, R&B
- Length: 43:44
- Label: Shadow Mountain
- Producers: Leroy Wolfgramm; Brian Blosil (Track 2)

The Jets chronology
Love People (1995)	Love Will Lead the Way (1997)	Then & Now (1998)

Professional ratings
Review scores
Source	Rating
AllMusic	3/5 stars

Love Will Lead the Way is the sixth studio album by Tongan-American family band The Jets, released in 1997 by Shadow Mountain Records.

== Critical reception ==
AllMusic wrote that "while there's nothing earthshaking in terms of musical boundaries pushed, the album is recommended for its ease on the ears and soul."

== Track listing ==
1. "Forever with You" (Leroy Wolfgramm, Moana Wolfgramm, Sarah Wolfgramm, Jacque Watene) – 4:08
2. "Tell Me I'm Not Wrong Again" (Brian Blosil, Don Stirling, Jerry Williams) – 4:34
3. "Jacque's Friend" (Leroy Wolfgramm, Moana Wolfgramm, Don Stirling, Haunga Feinga Jr.) – 4:11
4. "Love People" (Elizabeth Atuaia, Leroy Wolfgramm, Moana Wolfgramm, Haini Wolfgramm) – 4:01
5. "Whispers of My Heart" (Sam Cardon, Don Stirling, Leroy Wolfgramm) – 4:04
6. "Love is the Answer" (Todd Rundgren) – 4:12
7. "Love Will Lead the Way" (Tyler Castleton, Staci Peters) – 4:08
8. "Would I Know You" (Wayne Watson) – 3:24
9. "Face to Face" (Kenneth Cope) – 4:24
10. "Prayer of the Heart" (Tyler Castleton, Staci Peters) – 3:14
11. "I Stand All Amazed" (Charles H. Gabriel) – 3:24

== Personnel ==
The Jets

- Moana Wolfgramm – lead vocals, percussion
- Hola Motuapuka – keyboards, vocals
- Haunga Feinga Jr. – keyboards, percussion, DJ
- Leroy Wolfgramm – guitars, vocals
- Haini Wolfgramm – bass, vocals
- Rudy Wolfgramm – drums, percussion
- Aaron Watene – vocals

=== Album personnel ===
Vocalists

- Moana Wolfgramm – vocals (1–5, 7, 8, 10, 11), backing vocals (6, 7, 9, 10)
- Leroy Wolfgramm – backing vocals (1, 3, 5–7, 10), vocals (6, 9)
- Rudy Wolfgramm – backing vocals (1, 3, 5–7, 10), vocal arrangements (4)
- Hola Motuapuka – backing vocals (1, 3, 5, 10)
- Haini Wolfgramm – backing vocals (3, 10)
- Haunga Feinga Jr. – backing vocals (3, 10)
- Aaron Watene – backing vocals (3, 10, 11)
- Sarah Wolfgramm – backing vocals (3)
- The Katinas – vocals (4)
- Elizabeth Wolfgramm Atuaia – vocals (11)
- Sam Katina – vocal arrangements (4)
- Staci Peters – vocal arrangements (7)

Musicians

- Sam Cardon – acoustic piano, keyboards (1, 2), programming (2), percussion, arrangements (2, 5, 8–11), string arrangements (7), orchestration (8)
- Leroy Wolfgramm – keyboards, programming, guitars, arrangements (1, 5–7), guitars (3)
- Tom Hopkins – guitars, guitars (3), acoustic guitar (7)
- Sean Halley – guitars (6)
- Haini Wolfgramm – bass, bass guitar (7)
- Rudy Wolfgramm – drums
- Kenny Hodges – percussion (3)
- Brandon Fields – soprano saxophone (3)
- Arlen Card – alto saxophone (6), string arrangements (6)
- Bonnie Felger – strings (6)
- Nella Hopkins – strings (6)
- Chris McKellar – strings (6)
- Judy Rich – strings (6)
- Lois Swint – strings (6)
- The Jets – arrangements (3)

Orchestra

- Kenny Hodges – contractor
- Leonard Braus – concertmaster

Woodwinds

- Russell Harlow – clarinet
- Jane Lyman – flute
- Holly Gornik – English horn, oboe

Strings

- Carolee Baron and Ryan Selberg – cello
- Ben Henderson – double bass
- Lysa Rytting – harp
- Leslie Harlow and Chris McKellar – viola
- Tom Baron, Leonard Braus, Kathryn Collier, Lara Messerley, Richard Stout and Gwen Thornton – violin

Percussion

- Kenny Hodges

== Production ==
- Earl Madsen – executive producer, production coordinator
- Leroy Wolfgramm – producer
- Brian Blosil – producer (2)
- Sam Cardon – associate producer
- Daniel Carlisle – engineer, mixing (1, 3–7, 9–11)
- Mike Roskelley – additional engineer
- Sven Mead – assistant engineer
- Barry Gibbons – additional mixing (1, 3–7, 9–11), mixing (8)
- Jeff Carter – mixing (2)
- Doug Sax – mastering at The Mastering Lab (Hollywood, California)
- Shauna Gibby – album design
- Butch Adams – photography
- Michelle Hyde – hair, make-up
- Rudy Wolfgramm – management
