= Love People =

Studio album by The Jets
- Released: September 5, 1995
- Recorded: 1994–1995
- Studio: Pinnacle Studios (Orem, Utah)
- Genre: Pop, R&B
- Label: Liberty Park
- Producer: Haini Wolfgramm; Leroy Wolfgramm; The Jets

The Jets chronology
The Best of The Jets (1990)	Love People (1995)	Love Will Lead the Way (1997)

Love People is the fifth studio album by Tongan-American family band The Jets, released on September 5, 1995. It was released by the band's own independent label, Liberty Park Records.

It was the first release from the band in over 6 years, their previous record being 1989's "Believe".

== Track listing ==
1. "Love People" (The Jets) - 4:30
2. "Need Your Love" (Leroy Wolfgramm, Moana Wolfgramm) - 3:31
3. "One More Try" (Leroy Wolfgramm, Moana Wolfgramm) - 4:33
4. "Ooh Baby" (Elizabeth Wolfgramm) - 3:35
5. "Trust Me" (The Jets) - 4:35
6. "No Time to Lose" (Elizabeth Wolfgramm, Leroy Wolfgramm, Moana Wolfgramm) - 3:50
7. "Moonlight" (Leroy Wolfgramm, Moana Wolfgramm, Eugene Hunt, Keith Peters) - 3:57
8. "Sweet Melody" (Haini Wolfgramm, Leroy Wolfgramm, Aaron Watene) -
9. "Everybody Dance" (Elizabeth Wolfgramm, Haini Wolfgramm, Leroy Wolfgramm, Moana Wolfgramm, Aaron Watene, Ammon Watene) – 3:45
10. "Keep Believing" (Elizabeth Wolfgramm, Leroy Wolfgramm) - 4:00
11. "Never Love Again" (Leroy Wolfgramm, Jacque Kay Ingram) - 3:50
12. "I Stand All Amazed" (Charles H. Gabriel) - 3:15

== Personnel ==
The Jets

- Elizabeth Wolfgramm – lead vocals (1, 4, 10–12), backing vocals (1, 2, 4, 6–9)
- Moana Wolfgramm – lead vocals (1–3, 6, 7, 9, 12), backing vocals (1–4, 6–9)
- Leroy Wolfgramm – all Mac computer programming, digital performer, keyboards (1, 3, 8), acoustic piano (1), guitars (1, 4, 8), backing vocals (1, 4, 7, 9, 10), all instruments (2, 6, 7, 9), drums (3), lead vocals (8, 12), sequencing (10), programming (11)
- Haini Wolfgramm – bass (1, 3, 4), backing vocals (1, 4, 7, 9), lead vocals (12)
- Eddie Wolfgramm – backing vocals (1, 4, 7, 9), lead vocals (12)
- Kathi Wolfgramm – backing vocals (1, 4, 7, 9), lead vocals (12)
- Aaron Watene – backing vocals (1, 3, 4, 7, 9, 12), poly rap (2), lead vocals (3, 8, 12)

Additional musicians

- Sam Cardon – additional keyboards (1), keyboards (4, 10), horns (4), acoustic piano (12), arrangements (12)
- Matthew Neely – keyboards (11)
- Michael Dowdle – guitar solo (10)
- Todd Sorenson – drums (4), tambourine (4)
- Joe Wolfgramm – live drums (8)
- Haunga Feinga Jr. – DJ mix (1, 2, 9)
- Ashton Sillito – backing vocals (1, 9)
- Jacque Kay Ingram – arrangements (11)
- The Wolfgramm Clan and Provo Crew – choir (1)
- Jennifer Wolfgramm – backing vocals (6, 8)
- The Jets – channel choir (10)

== Production ==
- Leroy Wolfgramm – producer, ADAT vocal tracking
- Haini Wolfgramm – producer, ADAT vocal tracking
- The Jets – co-producers
- Don Carlisle – engineer, assistant engineer, digital workstation editing
- Jeff Carter – engineer, mixing
- Michael Greene – engineer
- Aaron Gant – assistant engineer
- Alan Greenall – assistant engineer
- Dale Sandberg – assistant engineer
- Gavin Lurssen – mastering
- Doug Sax – mastering
- The Mastering Lab (Hollywood, California) – mastering location
- Elizabeth Wolfgramm – ADAT vocal tracking
- Aaron Watene – ADAT vocal tracking
- Ron Platt – ADAT vocal tracking
- Butch Adams – photography
- Renee Bailey – additional photography
- Ammon Watene – album cover concept
- Mark Orton – design
- Wolfgramm/Schultz Entertainment – management
