= Triumph (Philip Bailey album) =

Studio album by Philip Bailey
- Released: September 29, 1986
- Studio: Buckman Studio and The Complex (Los Angeles, California); Cherokee Studios (Hollywood, California); Le Gonks West (West Hollywood, California)
- Genre: Gospel
- Length: 42:05
- Label: Word
- Producer: Philip Bailey; George Duke; Jerry Peters

Philip Bailey chronology
Chinese Wall (1984)	Triumph (1986)	Inside Out (1986)

Professional ratings
Review scores
Source	Rating
AllMusic	2/5 stars

Triumph is a gospel album by singer Philip Bailey, released in 1986 by Word Records. The album reached No. 18 on the Billboard Top Christian Albums chart and No. 33 on the Billboard Top Gospel Albums chart. Triumph also won a Grammy in the category of Best Male Gospel Performance.

== Track listing ==
1. "All Soldiers" (Keithen Carter, Patrick Leonard) – 4:47
2. "Thank You" (Bobby Nunn) – 3:40
3. "The Love of God" (Oliver W. Wells) – 3:12
4. "Marvelous" (George Duke, Philip Bailey) – 4:27
5. "The Same Way (You've Always Been)" (Lionel Butts) – 4:32
6. "The Other Side" (Keithen Carter, Patrick Leonard) – 4:45
7. "Bring It To Jesus" (Bob Bailey, Dheric Lee, Raymond Brown) – 5:38
8. "Triumph" (Jerry Peters) – 4:55
9. "Come Before His Presence" (Margaurite Ingram) – 4:31

== Credits ==
=== Musicians ===
- Philip Bailey – vocals, percussion (1, 3, 5–9)
- Robbie Buchanan – keyboards (1–3, 5–9), instruments (9)
- Greg Phillinganes – keyboards (1–3, 5–9)
- Bobby Nunn – keyboards (2)
- George Duke – all instruments (4)
- Paul Jackson Jr. – guitars (1–3, 5–9)
- Kevin Chokan – guitars (2)
- David Williams – guitars (3, 5, 8)
- Jerry Peters – guitars (3, 5, 7, 8)
- "Ready" Freddie Washington – bass (1, 3, 5)
- Byron Miller – bass (5–7)
- Paulinho da Costa – percussion (1, 3, 5–9)
- Andrew Woolfolk – horns (7)
- Carl Carwell – backing vocals
- Lynn Davis – backing vocals
- Winston Ford – backing vocals
- Kathy Hazzard – backing vocals
- Josie James – backing vocals

Music arrangements

- Philip Bailey – vocal arrangements
- George Duke – arrangements (4)
- Robbie Buchanan – arrangements (9)

=== Production ===
- Philip Bailey – producer
- George Duke – producer (4)
- Jerry Peters – producer (8)
- Ed Cherney – engineer (1, 3, 5–9)
- Phil Walters – engineer (2)
- Erik Zobler – engineer (4)
- Chuck Beeson – art direction
- Donald Krieger – graphic design
- Bonnie Schiffman – photography
- Jamie Shoop for Cavallo, Ruffalo & Fargnoli – management

== Charts ==
Chart performance for Triumph
Chart (1986)	Peak position
US Top Gospel Albums (Billboard)	34
US Top Christian Albums (Billboard)	18
