= Noreen Green =

American conductor and educator

Dr. Noreen Green
- Genres: Jewish Music, Classical Music
- Occupations: Artistic Director, Conductor, Educator
- Years active: 1994–present
- Website: lajs.org

Noreen Green is an American conductor and educator. She is Conductor and Artistic Director of the Los Angeles Jewish Symphony, which she founded in 1994, and the Jewish Community Chorale, which she founded in 2020.

== Early life and education ==
Noreen Green was born in the San Fernando Valley in Los Angeles, CA and grew up in Sherman Oaks. She received her Bachelor of Music Education degree, cum laude, from the University of the Pacific Conservatory of Music; a Master of Music degree in Choral Conducting, with distinction, from California State University, Northridge; and a Doctor of Musical Arts degree from the University of Southern California. Green participated in master classes in conducting led by Murry Sidlin at the Aspen Music School.

Green taught Choral Conducting at the University of Southern California, and was Assistant Professor of Music at California State University, Bakersfield and at California State University, Northridge.

== Los Angeles Jewish Symphony ==
On April 10, 1994, with encouragement from Murry Sidlin, Green founded the Los Angeles Jewish Symphony (LAJS), which is “dedicated to the performance and preservation of orchestral works of distinction which explore Jewish culture, heritage and experience.”

The LAJS has performed at the Walt Disney Concert Hall, the Ford Theatres, UCLA’s Royce Hall, the Gindi Auditorium at American Jewish University, the Soraya, and other venues. LAJS guest artists have included Hershey Felder, Theodore Bikel, Melissa Manchester, Billy Crystal, Tovah Feldshuh, Dave Koz and others.

== Conducting career ==
Green founded the Nowakowsky Chorale, a choir dedicated to the performance of the unpublished works of David Nowakowsky. For six years, she served as the West Coast Music Director of the David Nowakowsky Foundation and as Editor of the Nowakowsky manuscripts. Nine performance editions of his choral octavos, edited by Green, were published by Laurendale.

From 1994 to 2013, Green was Music Director and Conductor at Valley Beth Shalom in Encino, California. She has appeared as guest conductor with the Jerusalem Symphony and the Johannesburg Philharmonic. In 2015, she created the touring orchestra of the LAJS, the American Jewish Symphony, which made its debut in New York.

In February 2020, Dr. Green’s life and career was the subject of a Spotlight Series documentary by the Milken Archive of Jewish Music, which was featured on the Archive’s website and YouTube channel in conjunction with their Music Crossing Boundaries Festival.

== Awards ==
In 2012, Green received a Commendation from the Los Angeles County Board of Supervisors for her contribution to the arts in Los Angeles. Other awards include a Recognition of Contribution from State Assemblyman Bob Blumenfield for organizing and conducting a 10th anniversary concert commemorating the attacks of 9/11; a Recognition from Congressman Brad Sherman; the Jewish Cultural Star Award; and the Golda Meir Award from the State of Israel Bonds.

In 2017, she was honored by Musical America as one of its Movers & Shapers, the Top 30 Musical America Professionals of the Year.

== Personal life ==
Since 1992 Green has been married to Dr. Ian Drew, MD, who serves as President of the LAJS. They have a son and a daughter, and reside in Encino, California.

== Discography ==
In 2011, the Los Angeles Jewish Symphony recorded Los Angeles-based composer Sarah Stanton’s Violin Concerto, Ora E Sempre, featuring Mark Kashper, its concertmaster, as violin soloist. It was released on the Amabile Strings label.

In 2017, the symphony recorded Philadelphia-based composer Andrea Clearfield’s oratorio Women of Valor, featuring soloists Hila Plitmann, soprano, and Rinat Shaham, mezzo, with actress Tovah Feldshuh as narrator. The symphony previously presented the World Premiere of Women of Valor in 2000 at UCLA’s Royce Hall.

In 2019, the LAJS released The Music of Eric Zeisl. The recording, conducted by Green, highlighted the works of Jewish composer Eric Zeisl and featured Mark Kashper, violinist, and baritone/narrator Michael Sokol.
