= Aaron Zigman =

American composer and musician (born 1963)

- Born: January 6, 1963 (age 63); San Diego, California, United States
- Occupations: Composer, arranger, conductor, songwriter, producer
- Known for: Award-winning film composer and musician
- Notable work: Film scores for The Notebook; Bridge to Terabithia; John Q. The Proposal; Flicka; The Company Men; For Colored Girls; Flash of Genius; Sex and the City and Sex and the City 2 Co-wrote, arranged, and produced songs with: Quincy Jones; Christina Aguilera; John Legend; Ray Charles; Natalie Cole; Aretha Franklin; Patti LaBelle; Tina Turner
- Website: www.aaronzigman.com

External image
- Zigman at an event for Alpha Dog in 2006

Aaron Zigman (born January 6, 1963) is a classically trained American composer, producer, arranger, songwriter, conductor, and musician who has scored music for films including The Notebook, The Company Men, Bridge to Terabithia, John Q., The Proposal, Flicka, For Colored Girls, Flash of Genius, Sex & the City, Alpha Dog, and Escape from Planet Earth. He has also written, arranged and produced over 50 hit albums, and co-written songs with legendary and contemporary artists including Quincy Jones, Christina Aguilera, Phil Collins, Was (Not Was), John Legend, Dionne Warwick, Ray Charles, Natalie Cole, Aretha Franklin, Tina Turner, and Seal.

== Early life and career ==
Zigman was born in San Diego, California. His mother, a pianist and harpist, was his first music teacher, and he developed an early interest in jazz and concert music, studying with Rocky Slight, Gene Hartwell (a San Diego jazz player), and Florence Stephenson. A graduate of Point Loma High School, he studied at the University of California, Los Angeles.

While still in college, Zigman had a contract with Almo/Irving Music Publishing, wrote songs for Carly Simon and the television show Fame, and co-wrote with David Lasley, Jerry Knight, and Steve Cropper. In 1983, he began studying with his cousin George Bassman (who orchestrated The Wizard of Oz and wrote the music for the films Marty and The Postman Always Rings Twice). Bassman had also penned the Tommy Dorsey Classic, "Getting Sentimental Over You", was the musical arranger for Lena Horne and Benny Goodman, and orchestrated for Andre Kostelanetz.

In the 1980s, Zigman began to make a name for himself as a studio musician and wrote the pop music hits "Crush On You", "Curiosity", and "Private Number", top chart records for The Jets. He then worked for Clive Davis, and produced and arranged for Aretha Franklin and Natalie Cole. During this time he wrote, arranged, and produced songs for many of the top singers and artists in the industry such as Ray Charles, Phil Collins, Dionne Warwick, Boz Scaggs, Tina Turner, Seal, Carly Simon, the Pointer Sisters, Jermaine Stewart, Huey Lewis, Jennifer Holliday, Patti LaBelle, Chicago, Natalie Cole, and Christina Aguilera.

In the 1990s, he entered the film industry, with his producing, arranging, orchestration, and pianistic work being featured on soundtracks for Mulan, What's Love Got to Do With It?, The Birdcage, Licence to Kill, and Pocahontas.

His first film score was for the 2002 film John Q., which won a BMI Film Music Award. This led to his first major television score, for the 2004 Showtime production Crown Heights, and to his first film score for a major motion picture The Notebook, for which he won multiple BMI Awards.

In March 2020, Billie Eilish revealed 32 songs which inspired her Grammy-winning album When We All Fall Asleep Where Do We Go?. "Jesse's Bridge," a song composed by Zigman from his soundtrack for the Disney movie Bridge to Terabithia, was listed as one of the inspirations for Eilish's ILOMILO.

== Concert music ==
Zigman has composed both chamber and full orchestral works on commission, including a viola sonata; a 1994 tone poem Rabin: An Orchestral Work in Five Movements (premiered at Los Angeles' Westside Pavilion on December 25, 1997, repeated in Spring 1999 by the Los Angeles Jewish Symphony under the direction of Noreen Green in memory of Yitzhak Rabin, and recorded live on the Bernard Milken Jewish Community Campus in March 1999); Martyrology: A Tribute to Those Who Have Died in the Face of Persecution; Impressions, a 2004 suite for wind ensemble (premiered by Richard Todd and the USC Symphony Orchestra); Vis Vitae (mixed octet, featured at the historic Beverly Hills Presbyterian Church on Rodeo Drive as part of the "Voices of Hollywood" concert at the Third Annual Beverly Hills International Music Festival in 2006 and in Zigman's score for Flash of Genius; No Strings Attached, a 2007 horn sextet for Brian O' Connor (1951–2016) at UCLA; and a Rhapsody for Cello and Piano (premiered/recorded in 2015 by Andrew Shulman and Robert Thies).

His vocal music includes a setting of Shir L'Shalom (also recorded live on the Bernard Milken Jewish Community Campus in March 1999); two Ave Maria vocalises (one written with bassist Abraham Laboriel Sr., composed as the main title song for the film Virgin of Juarez and one written for the main title song of the film John Q, featuring Joshua Bell on violin); an Emmy Award-winning setting of the Hebrew prayer for peaceSim Shalom (from the Showtime TV film Crown Heights, with Alex Brown); and an Italian aria with chorus (La Donna in Viola, setting a translation of Ntozake Shange's poem "Pyramid", for 3 soprano soloists and SSAAT choir, also featuring Joshua Bell) featured in the film For Colored Girls (2009–2010).

For the soundtrack for the 2016 dramatic film Wakefield, French classical pianist Jean-Yves Thibaudet contributed piano work to Zigman's film score. This was the first time another pianist performed his film work. Zigman had first visited Beijing while working on the film score for Chinese movie Hidden Man, directed by Wen Jiang. Hidden Man was China's entry for Best Foreign Language Film at the 91st Academy Awards. The Tango Manos concerto project was suggested to Jean-Yves Thibaudet and Aaron Zigman by Yu Long, conductor and Chairman of the Beijing Music Festival. Zigman created a three-movement concerto for piano and orchestra, dedicating it to Thibaudet, who premiered the work under Huang Yi's direction with the China Philharmonic at the Beijing Music Festival, October 14, 2019. Zigman attended the October 13, 2019 press conference for the 22nd Beijing Music Festival in Beijing, China. Tango Manos was one of three works written for the Beijing Music Festival, co-commissioned by the China Philharmonic, Radio France and the San Francisco Symphony. The event was of cultural significance, taking place in Jingshan Park, in front of Shouhuang Hall.

Jean-Yves Thibaudet played the US premiere of Tango Manos with the San Francisco Symphony in a multi-concert series under the direction of Fabien Gabel, beginning on February 14, 2020. The work was a National Finalist for the American Prize in Composition (Professional Division, Orchestral Works). Zigman's Rhapsody for Cello and Piano will be premiered in the Baker-Baum Concert Hall at the La Jolla Music Society by Alisa Weilerstein and Inon Barnatan on August 15, 2021.

Zigman collaborated with Yu Long once more on the oratorio Émigré. Émigré premiered in Shanghai on November 17, 2023, and had its US premiere on February 29, 2024. A recording was made by Deutsche Grammophon and released on February 2.

== Filmography ==
=== Film ===
==== 2000s ====
Year	Title	Director(s)	Studio(s)	Notes
2002	John Q.	Nick Cassavetes	New Line Cinema	Won: BMI Film Music Award
2004	The Notebook	Nick Cassavetes	New Line Cinema	Won: BMI Film Music Award
2004	Raise Your Voice	Sean McNamara	New Line Cinema	Composed with Machine Head
2005	The Wendell Baker Story	Andrew Wilson; Luke Wilson	Wendell Distribution	
2005	In the Mix	Ron Underwood	Lionsgate	
2006	Alpha Dog	Nick Cassavetes	Universal Pictures	
2006	The Virgin of Juarez	Kevin James Dobson	First Look Studios	
2006	ATL	Chris Robinson	Warner Bros. Pictures	
2006	Take the Lead	Liz Friedlander	New Line Cinema	Composed with Swizz Beatz
2006	Akeelah and the Bee	Doug Atchison	Lionsgate	Nominated: Black Reel Award for Outstanding Original Score
2006	Step Up	Anne Fletcher	Touchstone Pictures	
2006	10th & Wolf	Robert Moresco	ThinkFilm	
2006	Flicka	Michael Mayer	20th Century Fox	
2007	Bridge to Terabithia	Gábor Csupó	Walt Disney Pictures	Nominated: IFMCA Award, Best Original Score - Fantasy
2007	Pride	Sunu Gonera	Lionsgate	
2007	Good Luck Chuck	Mark Helfrich	Lionsgate	
2007	The Jane Austen Book Club	Robin Swicord	Sony Pictures Classics	
2007	Why Did I Get Married?	Tyler Perry	Lionsgate	
2007	Martian Child	Menno Meyjes	New Line Cinema	
2007	Mr. Magorium's Wonder Emporium	Zach Helm	Icon Film Distribution	Composed with Alexandre Desplat; Nominated: IFMCA Award, Best Original Score - Fantasy
2008	Step Up 2: The Streets	Jon M. Chu	Touchstone Pictures	
2008	Meet the Browns	Tyler Perry	Lionsgate	
2008	Sex and the City: The Movie	Michael Patrick King	New Line Cinema	Won: BMI Film Music Award
2008	The Family That Preys	Tyler Perry	Lionsgate	
2008	Flash of Genius	Marc Abraham	Universal Pictures	
2008	Christmas Cottage	Michael Campus	Lionsgate	
2008	Lake City	Perry Moore; Hunter Hill	Screen Media Films	
2009	Madea Goes to Jail	Tyler Perry	Lionsgate	Won: BMI Film Music Award
2009	The Proposal	Anne Fletcher	Touchstone Pictures	Won: BMI Film Music Award
2009	My Sister's Keeper	Nick Cassavetes	New Line Cinema	
2009	The Ugly Truth	Robert Luketic	Columbia Pictures	Won: BMI Film Music Award
2009	I Can Do Bad All By Myself	Tyler Perry	Lionsgate	

==== 2010s ====
Year	Title	Director(s)	Studio(s)	Notes
2010	The Company Men	John Wells	The Weinstein Company	
2010	The Last Song	Julie Anne Robinson	Touchstone Pictures	Won: BMI Film Music Award
2010	Why Did I Get Married Too?	Tyler Perry	Lionsgate	Won: BMI Film Music Award
2010	Sex and the City 2	Michael Patrick King	New Line Cinema	
2010	For Colored Girls	Tyler Perry	Lionsgate	Nominated: Black Reel Award for Outstanding Original Score
2011	Madea's Big Happy Family	Tyler Perry	Lionsgate	Won: BMI Film Music Award
2011	I Don't Know How She Does It	Douglas McGrath	The Weinstein Company	
2011	What's Your Number?	Mark Mylod	20th Century Fox	
2012	Good Deeds	Tyler Perry	Lionsgate	
2012	Madea's Witness Protection	Tyler Perry	Lionsgate	Won: BMI Film Music Award
2012	Step Up Revolution	Scott Speer	Summit Entertainment	
2012	Yellow	Nick Cassavetes	Medient Studios	
2013	Escape from Planet Earth	Cal Brunker	The Weinstein Company	Won: BMI Film Music Award
2013	Temptation: Confessions of a Marriage Counselor	Tyler Perry	Lionsgate	
2013	Peeples	Tina Gordon Chism	Lionsgate	
2013	Baggage Claim	David E. Talbert	Fox Searchlight Pictures	
2014	The Other Woman	Nick Cassavetes	20th Century Fox	
2014	Addicted	Bille Woodruff	Lionsgate	
2014	The Best of Me	Michael Hoffman	Relativity Media	
2015	Mr. Right	Paco Cabezas	Focus World	
2015	I Saw the Light	Marc Abraham	BRON Studios	
2015	Court of Conscience	James Haven	Independent	Short film
2016	Dear Eleanor	Kevin Connolly	Destination Films	
2016	Wakefield	Robin Swicord	IFC Films	
2017	The Shack	Stuart Hazeldine	Summit Entertainment	

==== 2020s ====
Year	Title	Director(s)	Studio(s)	Notes
2020	A Nice Girl Like You	The Brothers Riedell	Vertical Entertainment	
2020	Gossamer Folds	Lisa Donato	Indican Pictures	
2020	The War with Grandpa	Tim Hill	101 Studios	
2022	A Jazzman's Blues	Tyler Perry	Netflix	
2023	God Is a Bullet	Nick Cassavetes	Wayward Entertainment	
2024	The Six Triple Eight	Tyler Perry	Netflix	
2025	Truth & Treason	Matt Whitaker	Angel	

=== Television ===
Year	Title	Director(s)	Network	Notes
2004	Crown Heights	Jeremy Kagan	Showtime	Television film
2005–2007	The ACLU Freedom Files	Various	Link TV	Documentary series
2010	30 for 30	John Singleton	ESPN	Documentary series Episode "Marion Jones: Press Pause"
2018	American Dream/American Knightmare	Antoine Fuqua	Showtime	Documentary film
2021–2025	And Just Like That...	Various	HBO Max	Television series
