= TAMI Show (band) =

American pop rock band

Tami Show
- the TAMI Show members posing in 1991

Background information
- Origin: Chicago, Illinois, United States
- Genre: Pop rock
- Years active: 1987–1992
- Labels: Chrysalis Records; RCA Records
- Past members: Cathy Massey; Claire Massey; Tommy Gawenda; Peter Spero; George McCrae; Mark Jiaras; Ken Harck
- Website: www.planetclaire.com

Tami Show was a pop rock band that originated from Chicago, Illinois in 1987.

== History ==
The group took its name from a 1964 concert film. The six-member ensemble (including sisters Cathy and Claire Massey on vocals) released an album on Chrysalis Records in 1988 and a second on RCA Records in 1991. They are best remembered for their US top 40 hit "The Truth".

Claire Massey continues to record solo material and maintains a website under the name "Planet Claire".

== Members ==
- Cathy Massey: vocals/guitar
- Claire Massey: vocals
- Tommy Gawenda: guitar
- Peter Spero: keyboards (1987-1991)
- George McCrae: keyboards (1991-1992)
- Mark Jiaras: bass
- Ken Harck: drums

== Discography ==
- Tami Show (Chrysalis Records, 1988)
- Wanderlust (RCA Records, 1991)

== Singles ==
- "She's Only Twenty" (Billboard Hot 100 peak #88, 1988)
- "The Truth" (Billboard Hot 100 peak #28, 1991)
- "Did He Do It To You" (did not chart, 1991)

== Contributions ==
Claire Massey and Cathy Massey are backup singers on the song "I'm A Wimp" from the Steve Dahl album Pet Fishsticks.
