= Why Did I Get Married Too? =

- Theatrical release poster
- Directed by: Tyler Perry
- Screenplay by: Tyler Perry
- Based on: Characters by Tyler Perry
- Produced by: Tyler Perry; Reuben Cannon
- Starring: Janet Jackson; Jill Scott; Sharon Leal; Malik Yoba; Richard T. Jones; Tasha Smith; Louis Gossett Jr. Cicely Tyson; Michael Jai White; Lamman Rucker; Tyler Perry
- Cinematography: Toyomichi Kurita
- Edited by: Maysie Hoy
- Music by: Aaron Zigman
- Production company: Tyler Perry Studios
- Distributed by: Lionsgate
- Release date: April 2, 2010
- Running time: 121 minutes
- Country: United States
- Language: English
- Budget: $20 million
- Box office: $60.7 million

Why Did I Get Married Too? is a 2010 American comedy-drama film directed by Tyler Perry and starring Janet Jackson, Tyler Perry, Tasha Smith, Jill Scott, Louis Gossett Jr., Malik Yoba, Michael Jai White, Sharon Leal, Richard T. Jones, Lamman Rucker, and Cicely Tyson. Produced by Lionsgate and Tyler Perry Studios, it is the sequel to Why Did I Get Married? (2007). The film explores the interactions of four couples who undertake another week-long retreat to improve their relationships that experience upheaval with further personal revelations within themselves.

The movie received mixed reviews from critics and grossed $60 million worldwide. White and Smith reprised their roles for the spinoff For Better or Worse in 2011.

== Plot ==
The four couples prepare for their next marriage retreat in the Bahamas. Sheila (Jill Scott) and her new husband, Troy (Lamman Rucker), are the first to arrive, followed (in order) by Patricia (Janet Jackson) and Gavin (Malik Yoba), Terry (Tyler Perry) and Dianne (Sharon Leal), and Angela (Tasha Smith) and Marcus (Michael Jai White). The men and the women separate to talk about the good and bad about their marriages. In a surprising twist, Sheila's ex-husband, Mike (Richard T. Jones), arrives, and Angela immediately starts a fight until he leaves the women alone to go see the guys. The guys and the girls are upset and annoyed that Mike is there, but they decide to let him stay.

That night, he talks about his and Sheila's relationship, which angers Troy. Dianne accidentally calls Terry "Phil" in the course of conversation. Angela is insistent about getting the password to Marcus' cell phone because she distrusts him, but Marcus distracts her using sex. Dianne and Terry hear arguing later and think it's Angela and Marcus, but it turns out to be Patricia and Gavin. When Dianne goes to investigate, she finds Patricia but cannot get her to tell her what's wrong. The next morning, Mike approaches Sheila and begins a conversation. Realizing his wrongdoing of betrayal and heartbreak towards Sheila, Mike profusely apologizes to her and tells her he misses her and wants her back. However, Sheila makes it very clear to Mike that she has moved on and that there is no future between them as she is happy with Troy. At the beach, the women meet an elderly couple (Louis Gossett Jr and Cicely Tyson) who have accidentally thrown a friend's ashes on Angela. Sheila invites them to dinner and they accept. At the "Why Did I Get Married?" ceremony, Patricia announces to the group that she and Gavin are getting a divorce, causing a distraught and angered Gavin to walk away from her, because he did not know she was going to announce it to them.

Back in Atlanta, Gavin and his lawyer meet Patricia with her lawyer, Dianne. Patricia and Gavin have decided to split everything down the middle in the settlement, but Gavin reveals that Patricia has not offered up the account containing her $850,000 book revenue. Patricia refuses to give Gavin any of her book money, but as she leaves, Gavin advises Dianne to tell Patricia to "prepare for a fight", as he intends to get half of that account as well. Meanwhile, Angela's neighbor tells her she's been hearing sexual noises from the house when Angela is not home. Angela believes Marcus is cheating and confronts him live on his television show before he ultimately gives her the password to his phone. Gavin comes home very drunk and confronts Patricia. He takes their son's baby photos and taunts her about her perceived lack of emotions, even about their divorce and their son's death, and then assaults her, douses her in vodka, and burns the photos.

Elsewhere, at Sheila's request, Mike agrees to help find Troy a job. Angela lectures Dianne and Sheila about how all men cheat. Patricia changes the locks and catches Gavin, Terry, and Marcus moving Gavin's things out, then learns Gavin has taken all their money, including her book money; enraged, Patricia trashes the house with his golf clubs. Angela comes home early to catch Marcus cheating and finds a couple in her bed, but after shooting up the room, she notices it was just the gardener and the maid having sex. Terry finally confronts Dianne about her infidelity; she reveals that she has been having an emotional affair and begs for forgiveness. Marcus and Angela fight, then reconcile, but only to fight again after Angela discovers Marcus has another phone. Troy arrives at Mike's apartment after finding out Mike got him his police job. After finding Sheila there, he angrily attacks Mike. Sheila tearfully confesses that she has been taking Mike to chemotherapy; she tries to apologize for being dishonest, but he leaves her.

The women go to Patricia's house to comfort her. The next day, Troy apologizes to Mike, who forgives him and invites Troy to have a drink with him and the guys, beginning a new friendship. Mike tells the men to fix their marriages because life is too short. Later that day, Gavin is humiliated and told off by an angry Patricia at his job. As Patricia watches him drive off, Gavin is struck and gravely injured by an oncoming truck. While everyone waits to hear the status of his condition, a tearful and regretful Patricia instructs the wives to fix their marriages, and everyone makes up. Gavin's doctor shows up and informs the group that he has died. The couples and Mike decided to have a memorial service for Gavin in the Bahamas.

One year later, as Patricia exits a university building, she is approached by a colleague. She tells Patricia that she knows someone who wants to meet her, a philanthropist, but Patricia refuses. The professor goes on to tell her that she can at least greet him because the university needs funds. Daniel Franklin (Dwayne "The Rock" Johnson) tells her that her books have helped him in grieving his divorce and invites her to have coffee. The movie ends with Patricia smiling at him.

== Cast ==
- Tyler Perry as Terry Brock
- Janet Jackson as Patricia Agnew
- Jill Scott as Sheila Jackson
- Sharon Leal as Dianne Brock
- Tasha Smith as Angela Williams
- Richard T. Jones as Mike
- Malik Yoba as Gavin Agnew
- Lamman Rucker as Troy Jackson
- Michael Jai White as Marcus Williams
- Louis Gossett Jr. as Porter Jones
- Cicely Tyson as Ola Jones
- Valarie Pettiford as Terry's Mom
- Dwayne Johnson as Daniel Franklin (uncredited cameo)

== Production ==
A June 5, 2009, report stated that Janet Jackson would reprise her role as Patricia, making her the third confirmed cast member to reprise her role. Due to her brother's sudden death, film production was halted for a short period of time, after which Jackson returned to continue with the project. On August 6, 2009, Jackson stated that she had finished filming her scenes.

On June 16, 2009, Tyler Perry confirmed that the entire cast from the first film would return for the sequel.

== Soundtrack ==
Janet Jackson recorded a song for the Why Did I Get Married Too? soundtrack entitled "Nothing". It served as the soundtrack's lead single. Also, Cameron Rafati's single "Battles" was featured in this film. Norwegian Christel Alsos was also featured with the song "Still". The soundtrack for the film was released on So So Def Recordings with distribution being handled by Malaco Records.

1. Ziggy Marley – "I Love You Too"
2. Janet Jackson – "Nothing"
3. Irma Thomas – "In the Middle of It All"
4. Mayer Hawthorne – "A Strange Arrangement"
5. John Brown's Body – "Blazing Love"
6. Chaz Shepard – "Chemical Reaction"
7. The Falcons – "I Can't Believe It"
8. The Vanguards – "Woman Come Home"
9. Bob & Gene – "Gotta Find a Way"
10. Christel Alsos – "Still"
11. Ronnie Butler – "Married Man"
12. The Weather Girls – "It's Raining Men"

== Reception ==
=== Critical response ===
The film received mixed reviews from critics. Based on 49 reviews collected by Rotten Tomatoes, the film has an overall approval rating from critics of 27% with an average score of 4.60/10. The website's critical consensus states, "It's bolstered by a strong performance from Janet Jackson, but ultimately, Tyler Perry's Why Did I Get Married Too? doesn't add anything new to Perry's melodramatic formula." Metacritic calculated an average score of 44/100, based on 12 reviews, indicating "mixed or average reviews". Audiences polled by CinemaScore gave the film an average grade of "A" on an A+ to F scale.

Wesley Morris of The Boston Globe gave the film 2½ out of 4 stars, claiming: "If Perry's cinematic vision remains less than 20/20, his sagacity gets stronger by the movie." Lisa Schwarzbaum of Entertainment Weekly graded the film a D, writing in her review: "It's a contradiction in terms to think of the phenomenally successful, prolific entertainment showman Tyler Perry as lazy, but there's no other description for this particular product: Terribly shot and crudely assembled." Scott Wilson concurred, stating: "Why Did I Get Married Too? lacks the underlying goodwill of some of his better work and plays like a gift wrapped present to his detractors." Wilson graded the movie 1.5/5 stars.

=== Box office ===
Why Did I Get Married Too? grossed a total of $30.2 million in its opening weekend placing second behind Clash of the Titans. Its opening weekend gross makes it the third highest opening for films created by Tyler Perry. As of June 6, 2010 the movie has grossed over $60 million domestically.

=== Awards/nominations ===
NAACP Image Awards

- 2011: Nomination - Outstanding Motion Picture
- 2011: Nomination - Outstanding Actress in a Motion Picture - Janet Jackson
- 2011: Nomination - Outstanding Supporting Actress in a Motion Picture - Jill Scott
- 2011: Nomination - NAACP Image Award for Outstanding Writing in a Motion Picture - Tyler Perry

== Sequel ==
In June 2021, Perry entertained the idea of revisiting the franchise with a film called Why Did I Get Married Again?; the sequel was confirmed in a slate announcement made by Netflix in January 2026.

== See also ==
- List of black films of the 2010s
