= Under Any Moon =

Single by Glenn Medeiros and the Jets

from the album Believe and The Karate Kid Part III soundtrack
- B-side: "You're My Woman, You're My Lady"; "High Wire"
- Released: 1989
- Genre: Pop
- Length: 3:48
- Label: Mercury; MCA
- Songwriter(s): Diane Warren
- Producer(s): Don Powell; Michael Verdick

Glenn Medeiros and the Jets singles chronology
"The Same Love" (1989)	"Under Any Moon" (1989)	"Somebody to Love Me" (1990)

"Under Any Moon" is a single by Glenn Medeiros and the Jets, released in 1989.

Written by Diane Warren, the song was released as a single only in the United Kingdom. It was included on the soundtrack for The Karate Kid Part III (1989), on the Mercury label, and was also included on the Jets' album, Believe (1989), on the MCA label.

The song failed to have any chart impact in the UK, and while it did receive minor airplay in the United States, it did not chart either. It was never performed live by the Jets.
