= You Better Dance =

Single by The Jets

from the album Believe
- B-side: "Do You Remember?"
- Released: 1989
- Length: 3:30
- Label: MCA Records
- Songwriter(s): Michael Jonzun
- Producer(s): David Z

The Jets singles chronology
"Anytime" (1988)	"You Better Dance" (1989)	"The Same Love" (1989)

"You Better Dance" is a song by the American sibling group, The Jets. The song was released as the first single from their third album, Believe, in 1989.

On the Billboard Hot 100, the song charted at number 59. It reached number 73 on the R&B chart and had further success on the dance chart, peaking at number 28.

== Chart performance ==
Chart (1989)	Peak position
US Billboard Hot 100	59
US Dance Club Songs (Billboard)	28
US Hot R&B/Hip-Hop Songs (Billboard)	73
