= Believe (The Jets album) =

1989 studio album by The Jets

Studio album by the Jets
- Released: July 8, 1989
- Recorded: November 1988 – June 1989
- Studios: Paisley Park (Minneapolis, Minnesota)
- Genres: Dance, pop
- Length: 42:56
- Label: MCA
- Producers: David Z; Ricky Peterson; Frankie Blue; Les Pierce; Michael Verdick; Gene Hunt; Don Powell

The Jets chronology
Magic (1987)	Believe (1989)	The Best of The Jets (1990)

Singles from Believe
- 1. "You Better Dance" Released: 1989; 2. "The Same Love" Released: October 3, 1989; 3. "Under Any Moon" Released: 1989; 4. "Somebody to Love Me" Released: January 23, 1990

Believe is the fourth studio album by Tongan-American family band the Jets, released on July 8, 1989, by MCA Records.

It includes the singles "You Better Dance", "The Same Love", Somebody to Love Me", and "Under Any Moon". The album peaked at No. 107 on the Billboard 200.

== Critical reception ==
Professional ratings
Review scores
Source	Rating
AllMusic	2.5/5 stars
The Encyclopedia of Popular Music	2/5 stars
The Rolling Stone Album Guide	1/5 stars

The Star Tribune called Believe the band's "most consistent LP," writing that "like the Miami Sound Machine, the Jets divide their repertoire between middleweight, made-for-radio dance music and middle-of-the-road ballads."

== Track listing ==
1. "You Better Dance" (Michael Jonzun) – 3:50
2. "Somebody to Love Me" (Nan Sudduth) – 3:46
3. "How Can I Be Sure" (Lydia Marie) – 3:46
4. "The Same Love" (Diane Warren) – 3:58
5. "In My Dreams" (Frankie Blue, Les Pierce) – 4:07
6. "Under Any Moon" with Glenn Medeiros (Warren) – 3:48
7. "Emotional" (M. Jonzun, Loria Jonzun) – 3:48
8. "Believe in Love" (Jonathan Butler) – 3:59
9. "Do You Remember" (Eugene Hunt, Leroy Wolfgramm) – 3:56
10. "Leave It to Me" (Rupert Holmes) – 3:32
11. "You've Got Another Boyfriend" (Gina Fellicetta, Shaun LaBelle) – 4:20

== Singles released ==
- "You Better Dance" b/w "Do You Remember" – number 28 US Dance, number 59 US Hot 100, number 73 US R&B
- "The Same Love" b/w "Can't Get Over You" – number 15 US Adult Contemporary, number 87 US Hot 100
- "Somebody to Love Me" b/w "You're So Right" – number 35 US Adult Contemporary, number 89 US R&B
- "Under Any Moon" b/w "You're My Woman, You're My Lady" by Glenn Medeiros

== Personnel ==
The Jets

- Elizabeth Wolfgramm – lead vocals (2–4, 6, 10, 11), backing vocals
- Moana Wolfgramm – backing vocals, lead vocals (5, 9)
- Kathi Wolfgramm – keyboards, backing vocals
- Leroy Wolfgramm – guitars, backing vocals, lead vocals (7, 8), vocal arrangements
- Haini Wolfgramm – bass guitar, backing vocals, lead vocals (1, 7)
- Eddie Wolfgramm – drums, saxophones, backing vocals
- Rudy Wolfgramm – drums, backing vocals

Additional musicians and arrangers

- Randy Goodrum – keyboards
- Rick Kelly – keyboards, bass, instrumental arrangements
- Shaun LaBelle – keyboards, bass
- Ricky Peterson – keyboards, bass, drums, percussion, instrumental arrangements, vocal arrangements
- Les Pierce – keyboards, drums
- Levi Seacer Jr. – keyboards, guitars, bass
- Frankie Blue – guitars
- Geoff Bouchieiz – guitars
- Bruce Gaitsch – guitars
- Paul Peterson – guitars, bass
- Freddie Johnson – bass
- Art Wood – drums
- David Z – drums, percussion, instrumental arrangements, vocal arrangements
- Paulinho da Costa – percussion
- Don Powell – percussion, instrumental arrangements, vocal arrangements
- Brian Gallagher – saxophones
- Michael Verdick – instrumental arrangements
- Glenn Medeiros – lead vocals (6)

Production

- Don Powell – executive producer, management, producer (2–8, 10, 11), mixing (9)
- David Z – producer (1, 3–5, 7, 8, 11), engineer (1, 3–5, 7, 8, 11), mixing (1–8, 10, 11)
- Ricky Peterson – producer (2, 10), associate producer
- Frankie Blue – producer (5)
- Les Pierce – producer (5)
- Michael Verdick – producer (6), engineer (6)
- Gene Hunt – producer (9)
- Leroy Wolfgramm – producer (9), mixing (9)
- Coke Johnson – engineer (2, 10)
- David Pinsky – engineer (9)
- Tom Garneau – assistant engineer
- Heidi Hanschu – assistant engineer
- Steve Hall – mastering at Future Disc (Hollywood, California)
- Jeff Adamoff – art direction, design
- Dave Wehlacz – art direction, design
- Randee St. Nicholas – photography
