= Los Angeles Jewish Symphony =

American non-profit orchestra

- Orchestra
- Short name: LAJS
- Founded: 1994
- Location: Los Angeles, California
- Music director: Noreen Green

The Los Angeles Jewish Symphony (LAJS) is a non-profit orchestra based in Los Angeles, California which specializes in presenting music of the Jewish experience. Founded in 1994, the symphony is led by Dr. Noreen Green, the Artistic Director and Conductor.

The symphony performs at a variety of venues in and around Los Angeles, including the Walt Disney Concert Hall, the Ford Theatres, and the Gindi Auditorium at American Jewish University.

According to Ventura Blvd Magazine, “Even though the symphony’s repertoire references the historic and cultural Jewish experience, it maintains broad appeal with programs marked by contemporary themes and issues that affect us all.”

== Biography ==
Since their founding in 1994, the Los Angeles Jewish Symphony has performed with a variety of entertainers, including Tovah Feldshuh, Roslyn Kind, Emily Bear, David Benoit, Hila Plitmann, Leonard Nimoy, Theodore Bikel, Marvin Hamlisch, Randy Newman, Hershey Felder, Laraine Newman, Dave Koz, Melissa Manchester, Amick Byram, and Alberto Mizrahi. They have also performed alongside such groups as the Agape International Choir, the Mariachi Divas, and the Yuval Ron Ensemble.

The symphony has performed concerts at several venues around Southern California, including the Soraya (Valley Performing Arts Center at CSUN), the Orpheum Theatre, Saban Theatre, Royce Hall at UCLA, Gindi Auditorium at American Jewish University, and Boston Court Performing Arts Center.

Beginning in 2004, the LAJS performed a series of concerts at the Ford Amphitheatre as part of the Ford Summer Partnership concert series. The concerts spanned a variety of subjects and themes, with titles including “Hershey Felder in Concert,” “Let’s Play LA!” and “L’Chayim! (To Life!)”.

In 2004, the symphony began the education outreach program “A Patchwork of Cultures: Exploring the Sephardic-Latino Connection.” The program explores the shared music, traditions, and history of both Sephardic Judaism and Latino cultures through a series of classroom workshops and a culminating concert event.

From 2008-2014, the symphony performed in a series of benefit concerts entitled Kindred Spirits at Walt Disney Concert Hall, benefiting a different humanitarian organization each year. In 2019, the symphony will return to Disney Hall to present Friendship and Harmony, a concert in collaboration with the Los Angeles Korean-American Musicians’ Association.

In 2019, the LAJS was announced as one of the collaborators for the Los Angeles County Violins of Hope project. The symphony will be joined by LA violinist Lindsay Deutsch for the Southern California opening concert.

== Recordings ==
In 2011, the Los Angeles Jewish Symphony recorded Los Angeles-based composer Sarah Stanton’s Violin Concerto, Ora E Sempre, featuring Mark Kashper, its concertmaster, as violin soloist. It was released on the Amabile Strings label.

In 2017, the symphony recorded Philadelphia-based composer Andrea Clearfield’s oratorio Women of Valor, featuring soloists Hila Plitmann, soprano, and Rinat Shaham, mezzo, with actress Tovah Feldshuh as narrator. The symphony previously presented the World Premiere of Women of Valor in 2000 at UCLA’s Royce Hall.

In 2019, the LAJS released The Music of Eric Zeisl. The recording, conducted by Green, highlighted the works of Jewish composer Eric Zeisl and featured Mark Kashper, violinist, and baritone/narrator Michael Sokol.

Both Women of Valor and The Music of Eric Zeisl were released on Albany Records.
