= The Same Love (song) =

Single by The Jets

from the album Believe
- B-side: "Can't Get Over You"
- Released: October 3, 1989
- Recorded: 1988–1989
- Genre: R&B; quiet storm; pop
- Length: 3:30
- Label: MCA
- Songwriter: Diane Warren
- Producers: David Z; Don Powell

The Jets singles chronology
"You Better Dance" (1989)	"The Same Love" (1989)	"Under Any Moon" (1989)

"The Same Love" is a single by The Jets, released on October 3, 1989.

== History ==
The ballad, written by Diane Warren, was released as the second single from their album, Believe on the MCA label. The song peaked at number 87 on the Billboard Hot 100 and failed to chart on the R&B chart. However, "The Same Love" reached number 15 on the adult contemporary chart.

== Charts ==
Chart (1989)	Peak position
U.S. Billboard Hot 100	87
U.S. Billboard Adult Contemporary	15

== Cover versions ==
- The freestyle girl group Exposé covered this song for their 1992 self-titled album.
