= Bobby Nunn (R&B musician) =

American music producer, songwriter and vocalist

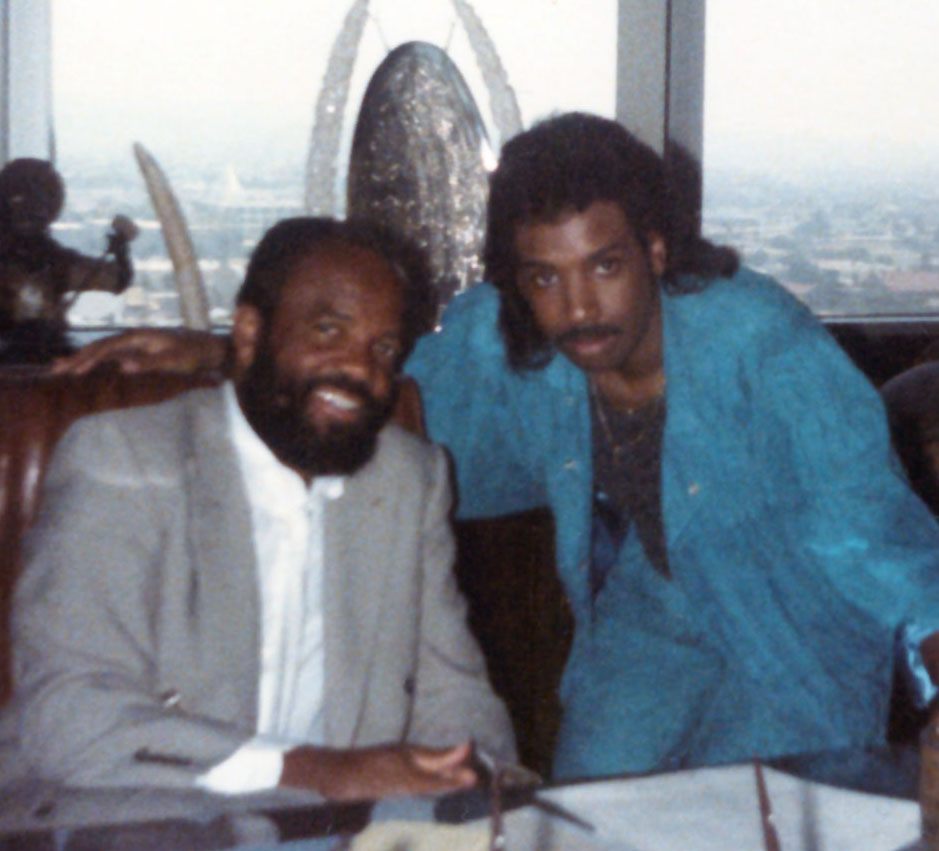
- Berry Gordy and Bobby Nunn in 1984

Background information
- Born: 1952 (age 73–74); Buffalo, New York, United States
- Genres: R&B; pop; funk
- Occupations: Singer; songwriter; record producer
- Instruments: Keyboards; vocals; bass guitar; drums; percussion
- Years active: 1970s–present
- Labels: Motown; Gordy; Columbia; MCA; Sony; Death Row; Interscope; Daptone; A&M; Word; Virgin; Tommy Boy; RCA; So So Def; CCEG; MoDo; BRANJi
- Member of: Bob & Gene

Bobby Nunn (born 1952) is an American R&B music producer, songwriter and vocalist, best known for his top 15 US Billboard R&B chart hit single, "She's Just a Groupie" and for writing and producing the Grammy nominated hit single "Rocket 2U" for The Jets.

== Life and career ==
=== Early years ===
He was born in Buffalo, New York, United States. As a teenager, Nunn honed his writing, producing, singing, musician, and engineering skills at MoDo Records. The MoDo studio was located in the basement of the Nunn family home. Bobby with childhood friend Gene Coplin, was half of the MoDo duo known as Bob & Gene recorded tunes for the Nunn family label, Mo Do Records. Bob and Gene's songs were featured in the films Tyler Perry's Why Did I Get Married Too, Our Family Wedding and Different from Whom? In 2011, Bob and Gene were inducted into the Buffalo Music Hall of Fame.

Nunn's big opportunity came through his association with Rick James. Nunn played keyboards and sang background vocals on some of James's early Motown recordings. Those recordings included the single, "You and I" and most of the tracks on James' Come Get It! and Bustin' Out of L Seven albums.

=== 1980s ===
After settling in L.A., Nunn worked with Earth, Wind & Fire's Philip Bailey on the Splendor album that featured him and his brother Billy Nunn, who co-wrote "Mary Jane" with Rick James and "Splendor" for Columbia Records. Bobby also worked with James on the Temptations' Reunion album.

In the early 1980’s, Bobby worked on an album by Michael Jackson soundalike Alfonzo Jones. Nunn was striding through a Los Angeles studio when he heard a familiar voice. “Oh, my God. That’s Michael Jackson!” he thought. “I guess they snuck him in there.” For Nunn, working in the same building as Jackson was huge. “After I got into my session and I saw Clay [McMurray],” a producer who’d once worked with the Jackson 5, “I said, ‘Man, why didn’t you tell me you had Michael Jackson?'” Nunn recalls. “He said, ‘That’s not Michael.’”

As a solo artist, Bobby Nunn co-produced his 1982 debut Motown album Second to Nunn, with Winston Monseque. He wrote or co-wrote all but one of the tracks. The album peaked at No. 148 on the Billboard 200 album chart. The lead single, "She's Just a Groupie" performed well, peaking at No. 15 on Billboard′s R&B singles chart. On the US Dance chart, the song went to No. 28. The chorus from "She's Just a Groupie" was used as the chorus on Snoop Dogg's song "Groupie" from his double platinum album, Tha Doggfather. It was sung by Charlie Wilson.

Bobby performed on American Bandstand, Soul Train, Thicke of the Night and other shows during that time. Nunn's 1983 follow-up album, Private Party, despite some favorable reviews, failed to equal the success of his first release. His single "Don't Knock It (Until You Try It)" (on Motown TMG 1323) peaked at No. 65 on the UK Singles Chart in February 1984. The album also spawned a club favorite, "Hangin' Out at the Mall" which featured Tata Vega. Nunn's third album titled Fresh was recorded in 1984, but was never released.

After leaving Motown, Nunn spent time working as a writer/producer for many artists and labels. Among them were "Long Distant Love" and "Welcome to the Club", produced by Nile Rodgers for Philip Bailey's Inside Out album. He also wrote the hit single "Thank You" for Bailey's Grammy winning Triumph album. In the late 1980s, Bobby Nunn wrote and produced the 1988 top 5, Grammy nominated hit song "Rocket 2U" for the Jets.

=== NFL incident ===
In July 2022, Nunn sued the National Football League (NFL) and NBC for using "Rocket 2U" during football games broadcast on NBC without a license. The case was settled in April 2023 for an undisclosed amount.

== Discography ==
=== Albums ===
Year	Album	Label	US
1982	Second to Nunn	Motown	148
1983	Private Party	Motown	—
"—" denotes releases that did not chart.

=== Singles ===
Year	Single	Peak chart positions		
Year	Single	US R&B	US Dance	UK
1982	"She's Just a Groupie"	15	28	―
1982	"Got to Get Up on It"	36	―	―
1982	"Sexy Sassy"	―	―	―
1982	"Get It While You Can"	―	―	―
1983	"Private Party"	66	―	―
1983	"Hangin' Out at the Mall"	50	―	―
1983	"Don't Knock It (Until You Try It)"	―	―	65
1983	"Do You Look That Good in the Morning?"	―	―	―
"—" denotes releases that did not chart or were not released in that territory.
