= Sendin' All My Love =

Single by The Jets

from the album Magic
- B-side: "Today It's Your Birthday"
- Released: August 1988
- Genre: Dance-pop
- Length: 3:30
- Label: MCA Records
- Songwriter(s): Stephen Bray, Linda Mallah
- Producer(s): Rick Kelly, Michael Verdick

The Jets singles chronology
"Make It Real" (1988)	"Sendin' All My Love" (1988)	"Anytime" (1988)

"Sendin' All My Love" is a song by the American sibling group The Jets. It was written by Stephen Bray (who is perhaps best known for his frequent collaborations with Madonna during the 1980s) and Linda Mallah.

Released as a single from The Jets' multi-platinum album Magic, the song was not nearly as successful as some other recordings by the group on the Billboard Hot 100 chart, where it stalled at number 88 and only reached number 72 on the R&B chart. However, in October, 1988, "Sendin' All My Love" was The Jets' first (and, to date, only) number 1 song on the dance chart, where it stayed for one week.

== Remixes ==
The 12" single featured the following remixes:

- "Justin Strauss Summer Splash Mix" – 7:20
- "Deep Dive Dubapella" – 7:12
- "Drumapella" – 4:37

== Chart performance ==
Chart (1988)	Peak position
U.S. Billboard Hot 100	88
U.S. Billboard Hot Black Singles	72
U.S. Billboard Hot Dance Club Play	1

== See also ==
- List of number-one dance hits (United States)
