= Special Kinda Love =

Single by the Jets

from the album The Best of The Jets
- Released: 1990
- Genre: Pop; new jack swing
- Length: 5:05
- Label: MCA
- Songwriters: Vassal Benford; Ron Spearman
- Producer: Vassal Benford

The Jets singles chronology
"Somebody to Love Me" (1990)	"Special Kinda Love" (1990)	"Forever in My Life" (1990)

Music video
- "Special Kinda Love" on YouTube

"Special Kinda Love" is a song recorded by American band, the Jets, released in 1990, through MCA Records. Written by Vassal Benford, it was released as the lead single from their greatest hits album, The Best of The Jets (1990), though the song was not nearly as successful as some other previous records by the group. It only reached number 83 on the R&B chart.

== Charts ==
Chart (1990)	Peak position
US Hot R&B/Hip-Hop Songs (Billboard)	83
