= Jerry Knight =

American singer

- Born: Jerry Ernest Knight; April 17, 1952; Los Angeles, California, U.S.
- Died: December 29, 1996 (aged 44) Los Angeles, California, U.S.
- Genres: R&B
- Occupations: Singer, songwriter, producer
- Instruments: Bass guitar, vocals
- Years active: 1978–1996
- Labels: Arista, A&M

Jerry Ernest Knight (April 17, 1952 – December 29, 1996) was an American R&B vocalist and bassist who reached prominence in the late 1970s and early 1980s, during which he was part of several groups and had a brief solo career.

== Career ==
A Los Angeles native, he first gained recognition as a founding member, along with Ray Parker Jr., of the R&B group Raydio, singing vocals on their early hit "Jack and Jill." Prior to this, he was a session player for many artists, notably providing bass on Bill Withers “Lovely Day.”

Knight left Raydio after before their second album was released to pursue a solo career, going on to release three solo albums and achieving moderate success with minor hits such as "Overnight Sensation," "Perfect Fit" and "Turn It Out".

In 1983, Knight teamed with session drummer Ollie E. Brown to form Ollie & Jerry. They provided the title track to the soundtrack for the 1984 movie Breakin', which reached #9 on the Billboard Hot 100. They also recorded the title track for Breakin' 2: Electric Boogaloo, which got to #45 on the Billboard R&B chart.

Shortly after Ollie & Jerry parted ways in 1985, Knight began working with the Jets, co-writing their early hits "Crush On You," "Curiosity," and "Private Number". Although his career as an artist faded, Knight continued to write and produce for other acts such as the Whispers, Patrice Rushen, DeBarge, Howard Hewett and Elkie Brooks.

== Personal life and death ==
According to an interview with his Raydio bandmate Ray Parker Jr., Raydio's song "Jack and Jill" was actually written about Knight and his wife, whose real name was Jill (Maxine) Knight. Parker added that Knight and Jill had two children together (Dereck and Lindsay).

Knight died of cancer in Los Angeles on December 29, 1996, at age 44. He is buried in Inglewood Park Cemetery.

== Solo discography ==
=== Albums ===
Year	Album	Chart positions		Label
Year	Album	US Pop	US R&B	Label
1980	Jerry Knight	165	51	A&M Records
1981	Perfect Fit	146	30	A&M Records
1982	Love's on Your Side	—	—	A&M Records
"—" denotes releases that did not chart.

=== Singles ===
Year	Title	Peak chart positions		
Year	Title	US Pop	US R&B	US Dance
1980	"Overnight Sensation"	103	17	18
1980	"Joy Ride"	—	87	—
1981	"Perfect Fit"	—	16	37
1981	"Turn It Out"	—	65	—
1982	"She's Got to Be (A Dancer)"	—	71	—
"—" denotes releases that did not chart or were not released.

=== Songwriting credits ===
Year	Artist	Song title	Album
1977	Rare Earth	"Is Your Teacher Cool?"	Rarearth
1978	Elkie Brooks	"Since You Went Away"	Shooting Star
1979	Charles Jackson	"Gonna Get Your Love"	I'm Gonna Get Your Love
1980	Dee Edwards	"Don't Walk Away"	Two Hearts Are Better Than One
1981	Four Tops	"Don't Walk Away"	Tonight!
1983	The Whispers	"Tonight"	Love for Love
1983	Philip Bailey	"Desire"	Continuation
1984	Ollie & Jerry	"Breakin'... There's No Stopping Us"	Breakin' Soundtrack
1984	George Duke	"Secret Rendezvous"	Secret Rendezvous
1984	Ollie & Jerry	"They're So Incredible"	Revenge of the Nerds Soundtrack
1984	Philip Bailey	"Photogenic Memory"	Chinese Wall
1984	The Chi Lites	"Running Around"	Steppin' Out
1985	Howard Johnson	"Stand Up"	The Vision
1985	Jeff Lorber	"It Takes a Woman"	Step by Step
1985	Willie Hutch	"Sexy Feelin"	Making a Game Out of Love
1985	The Jets	"Curiosity"	The Jets
1985	The Jets	"Crush on You"	The Jets
1985	The Jets	"Private Number"	The Jets
1985	The Jets	"Love Umbrella"	The Jets
1985	The Jets	"Heart on the Line"	The Jets
1985	The Jets	"Right Before My Eyes"	The Jets
1986	Bunny Debarge	"Save the Best for Me"	In Love
1986	Bunny Debarge	"Life Savier"	In Love
1986	O'Bryan	"Tenderoni"	Surrender
1986	O'Bryan	"You Have Got to Come to Me"	Surrender
1986	O'Bryan	"What Goes Around"	Surrender
1987	Dionne Warwick	"Cry on Me"	Reservations for Two
1987	Natalie Cole	"Everlasting"	Everlasting
1987	Brenda K. Starr	"Drive Another Girl Home"	Brenda K. Starr
1988	Howard Hewett	"Challenge"	Forever and Ever
1988	Five Star	"Physical Attraction"	Rock the World
1992	Nona Gaye	"Give Me Something Good"	Love for the Future
