= Anytime (The Jets song) =

Single by The Jets

from the album Magic
- B-side: "Christmas in My Heart"
- Released: October 6, 1988
- Genre: Pop
- Length: 3:30
- Label: MCA Records
- Songwriter(s): Rupert Holmes
- Producer(s): Rupert Holmes; Don Powell

The Jets singles chronology
"Sendin' All My Love" (1988)	"Anytime" (1988)	"You Better Dance" (1989)

"Anytime" is a song by the American sibling group, The Jets. It was written by Rupert Holmes, best known for his 1979 hit "Escape (The Piña Colada Song)".

"Anytime" was released as the final single from their multi-platinum album, Magic. It reached number 35 on the Billboard Adult Contemporary chart in late 1988.

== Charts ==
Chart (1988)	Peak position
US Adult Contemporary (Billboard)	35
