= Crush on You (The Jets song) =

1986 single by the Jets

Single by the Jets

from the album The Jets
- B-side: "Right Before My Eyes"
- Released: March 12, 1986
- Genre: Freestyle
- Length: 4:30
- Label: MCA
- Songwriters: Jerry Knight; Aaron Zigman
- Producers: Don Powell; David Rivkin; Jerry Knight; Aaron Zigman

The Jets singles chronology
"Curiosity" (1985)	"Crush on You" (1986)	"Private Number" (1986)

Music video
- "Crush on You" by the Jets on YouTube

"Crush on You" is a song by American band the Jets, released in 1986 as the second single from their eponymous debut album. The song reached number three on the Billboard Hot 100 and number five on the UK Singles Chart. Jerry Knight and Aaron Zigman co-wrote the song which put the Jets on the charts. The record was also given away in the UK in flexi disc format by being attached to the cover of Smash Hits magazine.

== Music video ==
In the music video, filmed on December 26, 1985, the Jets play the song and dance to it. It was directed by Stephen Rivkin and produced by Darrell Brand. Unlike the album version, which is 4:30, the music video version is shortened to 3:41. In 2019, Brand uploaded an HD remaster of the music video to his personal YouTube channel as part of "a resumé reel of [his] past work."

== Track listings ==
7-inch single

1. "Crush on You" – 3:40
2. "Right Before My Eyes" – 3:49

12-inch single

1. "Crush on You" (extended version) - 6:35
2. "Crush on You" (radio edit) - 5:25
3. "Crush on You" (instrumental) - 6:35

== Credits ==
- Elizabeth Wolfgramm – vocals
- Moana Wolfgramm – vocals, keyboards
- Eugene Wolfgramm – vocals, percussion
- LeRoy Wolfgramm – electric guitars
- Haini Wolfgramm – bass
- Kathi Wolfgramm – keyboards
- Rudy Wolfgramm – drums
- Eddie Wolfgramm – percussion

== Charts ==
=== Weekly charts ===
Weekly chart performance for "Crush on You" by the Jets
Chart (1986–1987)	Peak position
Canada Retail Singles (The Record)	17
Canada Top Singles (RPM)	9
Ireland (IRMA)	9
New Zealand (Recorded Music NZ)	43
UK Singles (Official Charts)	5
US Billboard Hot 100	3
US Dance Club Songs (Billboard)	4
US Dance Singles Sales (Billboard)	17
US Hot R&B/Hip-Hop Songs (Billboard)	4

=== Year-end charts ===
Year-end chart performance for "Crush on You" by the Jets
Chart (1986)	Rank
Canada Top Singles (RPM)	67
US Billboard Hot 100	52

== Aaron Carter version ==
"Crush on You"

Single by Aaron Carter

from the album Aaron Carter
- Released: August 15, 1997
- Length: 3:25
- Label: Edel America
- Songwriters: Jerry Knight; Aaron Zigman
- Producer: Gary Carolla

Aaron Carter singles chronology
"Crush on You" (1997)	"Crazy Little Party Girl" (1997)

In August 1997, Aaron Carter released a cover of the song on his debut self-titled album, Aaron Carter. It reached the top 10 in several countries, including Australia and the UK.

=== Music video ===
In addition to Aaron Carter, his older brother Nick makes a cameo at the beginning of the video, where he consoles Aaron when he confides that the girl he has a crush on is only into athletes, specifically basketball, football players and weightlifters, which Aaron refers to as "muscle men". Before he leaves, Nick tells his younger brother to not worry about the other guys and to just be himself, saying that girls like that because he "knows these things".

After his brother leaves, Aaron finds a poster advertising a talent show taking place in the park, where he performs the song for the crowd. He also meets his crush while she watches some boys playing basketball, which leads Aaron to try to get her attention, which he cannot seem to do as she does not even acknowledge his presence. Even as he notices the girl flirting with some boys playing football, he is still having no luck and even imagines the football players she was with chasing him down as he is carrying the football. Unbeknownst to him, the first person he told about his crush told another person, and then another, playing a game of telephone until the news finally reaches the girl as he is performing. He seemingly wins the girl at the end as she kisses him on the cheek, but when another girl comes along with cotton candy in her hand, he decides to walk off with that other girl instead, leaving the original girl disappointed.

=== Track listing ===
1. "Crush on You" (main mix) – 3:25
2. "Crush on You" (remix) – 4:07
3. "Crush on You" (Gary's mix) – 4:07
4. "Crush on You" (instrumental) – 4:02

=== Charts ===
==== Weekly charts ====
Weekly chart performance for "Crush on You" by Aaron Carter
Chart (1997–1998)	Peak position
Australia (ARIA)	9
Austria (Ö3 Austria Top 40)	6
Belgium (Ultratop 50 Flanders)	33
Estonia (Eesti Top 20)	20
Europe (Eurochart Hot 100)	17
Germany (GfK)	5
Iceland (Íslenski Listinn Topp 40)	40
Netherlands (Dutch Top 40)	18
Netherlands (Single Top 100)	29
New Zealand (Recorded Music NZ)	35
Norway (VG-lista)	7
Scottish Singles Sales (Official Charts)	7
Sweden (Sverigetopplistan)	18
Switzerland (Schweizer Hitparade)	5
UK Singles (Official Charts)	9
UK Indie (Official Charts)	1

==== Year-end charts ====
1997 year-end chart performance for "Crush on You" by Aaron Carter
Chart (1997)	Position
Europe (Eurochart Hot 100)	91
Germany (Media Control)	53
Sweden (Topplistan)	59
Switzerland (Schweizer Hitparade)	47
UK Singles (OCC)	153

1998 year-end chart performance for "Crush on You" by Aaron Carter
Chart (1998)	Position
Australia (ARIA)	69

=== Certifications ===
Certifications for "Crush on You" by Aaron Carter
Region	Certification	Certified units/sales
Australia (ARIA)	Gold	35,000^{^}
Germany (BVMI)	Gold	250,000^{^}
^{^} Shipments figures based on certification alone.
