= Make It Real =

Single by The Jets

from the album Magic
- B-side: "So True" (cassette)
- Released: April 13, 1988
- Recorded: 1987
- Genre: R&B
- Length: 4:16
- Label: MCA Records
- Songwriter(s): Don Powell; Rick Kelly; Linda Mallah
- Producer(s): Don Powell; Rick Kelly; Michael Verdick

The Jets singles chronology
"Rocket 2 U" (1988)	"Make It Real" (1988)	"Anytime" (1988)

"Make It Real" is a song by the American sibling group the Jets, released as a single from their album, Magic in April 1988.

== Background ==
Moana Wolfgramm of the Jets recalled: "'Make It Real' was given to us at the eleventh hour [i.e. last minute]. We needed a slow ballad [when] we were finishing up the last tracks for the 'Magic' album. Our manager Don Powell, Linda Mallah and Rick Kelly wrote this song and it was simple yet very catchy. I remember Liz [Elizabeth Wolfgramm] recorded it on the road after one of our shows, I think somewhere in Texas." One of the two videos for "Make It Real" showed Elizabeth Wolfgramm singing in front of a basic blue screen background: although Elizabeth Wolfgramm was the only group member to sing on the track, still images of the other Jets were shown during the instrumental break. The other video features the entire band performing the song, with Elizabeth Wolfgramm standing in front of the other group members playing their individual instruments, interspersed with close-up shots of individual band members throughout the song.

The B-side of the cassette single is a non-album track written and produced by oldest member LeRoy titled "So True".

"Make It Real" reflects back upon a past relationship one year since the singer met her lover. The singer is reminded of the happy times in their relationship and wants another opportunity to rekindle the passion.

"Make It Real" was the group's fifth and final Top Ten hit on the Billboard Hot 100 chart, where it spent two weeks at number 4 in late June and early July 1988. On the Adult Contemporary chart, the song was the group's second number 1 hit (following "You Got It All" from the previous year). On the Hot Black Singles, "Make It Real" reached number 24.

== Track listing ==
1. "Make It Real"
2. "So True" (cassette single)

== Chart performance ==
Chart (1988)	Peak position
US Billboard Hot 100	4
US Billboard Hot Black Singles	24
US Billboard Hot Adult Contemporary Tracks	1

=== Year-end charts ===
Chart (1988)	Position
United States (Billboard)	51
