= I Do You =

Single by The Jets

from the album Magic
- B-side: "Cross the Line"
- Released: August 30, 1987
- Genre: Dance-pop
- Length: 3:30
- Label: MCA Records
- Songwriter(s): Ricky Lee Kelly, Linda Mallah
- Producer(s): Rick Kelly, Michael Verdick

The Jets singles chronology
"Cross My Broken Heart" (1987)	"I Do You" (1987)	"Rocket 2 U" (1988)

"I Do You" is a song by the American sibling group The Jets. It was written by Rick Kelly and Linda Mallah.

Released as the second single from The Jets' multi-platinum album Magic in 1987, the song achieved moderate success. It reached number 20 on the Billboard Hot 100 and number 19 on the R&B chart.

== Music video ==
The official music video was directed by Stephen E. Rivkin.

== Chart performance ==
Chart (1987)	Peak position
US Billboard Hot 100	20
US Hot R&B/Hip-Hop Songs (Billboard)	19
