= Christmas with The Jets =

Studio album by The Jets
- Released: October 30, 1986
- Recorded: 1986
- Studios: VPI Sound (Minneapolis, Minnesota); Sunrise Sound Studios (Houston, Texas); Sunset Sound Recorders (Hollywood, California)
- Genres: Pop; R&B; Christmas
- Length: 32:41
- Label: MCA
- Producers: Don Powell; Barry Mann; Steve Tyrell

The Jets chronology
The Jets (1985)	Christmas with The Jets (1986)	Magic (1987)

Christmas with The Jets is the second studio album by Tongan-American family band The Jets, released on November 30, 1986, by MCA Records. It is also their first and only Christmas album to date. Unlike many other holiday albums, it does not include any covers of staple Christmas songs from the past; all are original compositions.

Although a single from this album was not released at the time, "Christmas In My Heart" would appear on the B-side of their single, "Anytime" two years later in 1988. Another notable track includes "Somewhere Out There" from the animated film An American Tail (1986) which was also recorded and released by Linda Ronstadt and James Ingram at the same time to become a hit for the duo a few months later in 1987. Rupert Holmes penned "You Make It Christmas" after previously contributing "You Got It All" to The Jets' first album, and would also write the previously mentioned "Anytime" for their next.

== Track listing ==
Side one
No.	Title	Writer(s)	Lead vocals	Length
1.	"This Christmas"	Charles Fotson Davis III; Bob Marsh; Jerry Marsh; Robert Marsh; Don Powell	Haini	4:08
2.	"Christmas in My Heart"	Holly Dunn; John Rosasco	Elizabeth	4:16
3.	"All Alone on Christmas"	K. Tucker	LeRoy	2:31
4.	"On Christmas Night"	The Jets; Pamela Phillips-Oland	Moana	3:02
5.	"I'm Home for Christmas"	Phillips-Oland; Peter Leinbeiser	Eugene	3:13

Side two
No.	Title	Writer(s)	Lead vocals	Length
1.	"Somewhere Out There" (Linda Rondstadt and James Ingram cover)	James Horner; Barry Mann; Cynthia Weil	Eugene and Moana	3:56
2.	"Love So Rare"	The Jets; Phillips-Oland	LeRoy	2:58
3.	"Christmas Is My Favorite Time of Year"	Pete McCann	Moana	2:05
4.	"You Make It Christmas"	Rupert Holmes	Rudy	3:35
5.	"This Christmas, This Year"	David Lasley; Willie Wilcox	Elizabeth	2:50
Total length:				32:41

== Personnel ==
The Jets

- LeRoy Wolfgramm
- Eddie Wolfgramm
- Eugene Wolfgramm
- Haini Wolfgramm
- Rudy Wolfgramm
- Kathi Wolfgramm
- Elizabeth Wolfgramm
- Moana Wolfgramm

Arrangements

- Dan Johnson (instrumental)
- Doug Johnson (instrumental)
- Don Powell (vocal)
- LeRoy Wolfgramm (vocal)

=== Production ===
- Don Powell – producer, direction
- Barry Mann – producer (6)
- Steve Tyrell – producer (6)
- Dan Johnson – associate producer, engineer
- Doug Johnson – associate producer, engineer
- Coke Johnson – engineer, mixing
- Les Williams – engineer
- Jeff Adamoff – art direction
- Jim Emmerson – design
- Norm Ung – design
- DZN, The Design Group – design
- Tom Lowe – photography
- Terra Andrews – make-up
