= Cross My Broken Heart (The Jets song) =

Single by The Jets

from the album Magic and Beverly Hills Cop II soundtrack
- B-side: "Bad Guys" by the Heat
- Released: May 20, 1987
- Recorded: 1986
- Genre: Dance Pop
- Length: 4:08
- Label: MCA
- Songwriters: Stephen Bray; Tony Pierce
- Producers: Stephen Bray; Michael Verdick

The Jets singles chronology
"Christmas in My Heart" (1986)	"Cross My Broken Heart" (1987)	"I Do You" (1987)

"Cross My Broken Heart" is the title of the first single released from Magic, the second studio album released by the American band The Jets. It also appears on the soundtrack to the Eddie Murphy film, Beverly Hills Cop II. The single reached number seven on the US Billboard Hot 100 in August 1987.

== Music video ==
The accompanying music video features the group performing inside a soundstage, against a backdrop of a movie theater entrance. It does not contain any scenes from the film Beverly Hills Cop II; however, it shows stills of the group posing in front of the film's marquee. Eugene Wolfgramm is in the video, despite having left the group to form Boys Club. The video was the first filmed inside of Paisley Park.

== Charts ==
=== Weekly charts ===
Chart (1987)	Peak position
Belgium (Ultratop 50 Flanders)	28
Italy Airplay (Music & Media)	4
New Zealand (Recorded Music NZ)	32
US Billboard Hot 100	7
US Dance Club Songs (Billboard)	8
US Hot R&B/Hip-Hop Songs (Billboard)	11

=== Year-end charts ===
Chart (1987)	Peak position
US Top Pop Singles (Billboard)	90
