= Stephen Bray =

American musician (born 1956)

- Born: Stephen Pate Bray; December 23, 1956 (age 69); Detroit, Michigan, U.S
- Genres: Pop; dance; R&B; rock
- Occupations: Songwriter; music producer; musician; composer
- Instruments: Drums; keyboards; vocals
- Years active: 1979–present
- Labels: ZE, MCA; Saturn Sounds Studios; Soultone Records

Stephen Pate Bray (born December 23, 1956) is an American songwriter, drummer, and record producer. He is best known for his collaborations with Madonna, being a member of the band Breakfast Club, and for winning the 2017 Grammy Award for the Best Musical Theater Album of the Tony Award-winning revival of The Color Purple. Bray owns and operates Saturn Sound recording studios and the Soultone Records label.

His song "Cross My Broken Heart" was featured on the soundtrack to the 1987 feature film Beverly Hills Cop II.

== Career ==
Bray began studying music through private instruction in Detroit, attended Washtenaw Community College in Ann Arbor. He continued his education at Berklee College of Music in Boston in 1978.

=== Collaborations with Madonna ===
Bray dated Madonna before her fame when she was attending the University of Michigan in Ann Arbor for dance in 1976. He moved to New York after receiving a call from Madonna in November 1980; at that time she was a member of the band Breakfast Club in Queens. Madonna wanted to form a new band and invited Bray to play the drums. They formed the band Emmy and the Emmys. They also rekindled their romance and together they moved into The Music Building in Manhattan for a while.

Madonna obtained a recording contract with Gotham Management, managed by Camille Barbone in 1981. Barbone put together a new band with session musicians although Madonna wanted Bray as her drummer. Barbone knew they had been romantically involved and didn't want love affairs among band members. The music she was producing with them was more rock oriented but Madonna had her eyes set on dance music. She and Stephen Bray continued working on a parallel project, more club oriented.

After being signed to Sire Records in 1982, Madonna opted not to work with Bray for her debut album, but they continued collaborating with her second album Like a Virgin (1984). Together, they wrote and produced some of the biggest hit songs of the 1980s, including several of Madonna's biggest hits. The songs Bray and Madonna composed often followed a distinctive structure, many of which repeat the song's second verse and bridge before fading out with the chorus. Their partnership concluded with their work on Madonna's album Like a Prayer (1989).

=== The Breakfast Club ===
Following Madonna's rise to stardom, Bray rejoined Breakfast Club, and the quartet signed first with ZE Records and later with MCA. The band's eponymous first album was released in early 1987, preceded by the Top 10 hit "Right on Track". Bray co-wrote most of the albums' songs with bandmate Dan Gilroy, and Bray produced several songs. The band's second album was not released, and Breakfast Club broke up shortly afterward.

=== The Color Purple ===
Bray made his Broadway debut in 2005 as composer and lyricist for the Broadway version of Alice Walker's book The Color Purple. He was nominated for a Tony Award for his work on the show.

== Personal life ==
Bray lives in Studio City, California with his wife, movie producer Stephanie Allain, who produced Hustle & Flow and Black Snake Moan. Bray's brother is the music video director Kevin Bray.

According to Mary Gabriel's book Madonna: A Rebel Life, Stephen Bray dated Madonna in 1977.

== Discography ==
=== Singles ===
Song	Artist
"Ain't No Big Deal"	Barracuda (original demo by Madonna)
"Angel"	Madonna
"Stay"	Madonna
"Pretender"	Madonna
"Over and Over"	Madonna
"Into the Groove"	Madonna
"Say It, Say It"	E.G. Daily
"Baby Love"	Regina
"True Blue"	Madonna
"Jimmy, Jimmy"	Madonna
"Where's the Party"	Madonna
"Spotlight"	Madonna
"Cross My Broken Heart"	The Jets
"Sendin' All My Love"	The Jets
"Each Time You Break My Heart"	Nick Kamen (feat. Madonna)
"Right on Track"	Breakfast Club
"Causing a Commotion"	Madonna
"Can't Stop"	Madonna
"Express Yourself"	Madonna
"Keep It Together"	Madonna
"Baby Going Shake"	Royalty
"Get Over"	Nick Scotti (original demo by Madonna)
"Count the Days"	Kylie Minogue
"Rhythm of Love"	Kylie Minogue
"Little Black Book"	Gina G
"That's Why"	The Party
"Needin' Someone"	The Party
"Change on Me"	The Party

=== Unreleased songs ===
Song	Artist
"One More Chance"	Madonna
"Warning Signs"	Madonna
"Desperately Seeking Susan"	Madonna
"Working My Fingers to the Bone"	Madonna
"Pipeline"	Madonna
"Love Attack"	Madonna
"First Is a Kiss"	Madonna

== See also ==
Category:Songs written by Stephen Bray
