= Rocket 2 U =

Single by The Jets

from the album Magic
- B-side: "Our Only Chance"
- Released: January 1, 1988
- Genre: Dance-pop; R&B
- Length: 3:41
- Label: MCA
- Songwriter: Bobby Nunn
- Producer: Bobby Nunn

The Jets singles chronology
"I Do You" (1987)	"Rocket 2 U" (1988)	"Make It Real" (1988)

"Rocket 2 U" is a song by the American sibling group, The Jets. It was written and produced by Bobby Nunn. The single, featuring lead vocals by Haini Wolfgramm, received a nomination for Best R&B Performance by a Duo or Group with Vocals at the 31st Grammy Awards in 1989.

Released as the third single from their album Magic in 1988, the song was the second most successful single released from the album, peaking at number six on the Billboard Hot 100 and number five on the R&B chart.

In July 2022, Nunn sued the NFL and NBC for using "Rocket 2 U" during football games on NBC without a license. The case was settled in April 2023 for an undisclosed amount.

== Background ==
Nunn originally offered "Rocket 2 U" to Earth, Wind & Fire for inclusion on their 1987 album, Touch the World. During that time, Nunn was talking to Bobby Brown, who introduced him to MCA Records executive Louil Silas Jr. Nunn played Silas several demos - one of which was "Rocket 2 U". Silas then wanted to give the song to The Jets. Nunn insisted on Earth, Wind & Fire recording the song, but the group was taking too long to start recording it. After the long wait, Philip Bailey suggested letting The Jets record it, to which Nunn agreed.

== Music video ==
The music video for the song depicts the band performing the song while wearing colorful clothes in front of a grey background, and comedic shots of a woman who has things going wrong all around her house, representing some of the song lyrics.

== Chart performance ==
Chart (1988)	Peak position
Australia (Kent Music Report)	92
Netherlands (Single Top 100)	90
US Billboard Hot 100	6
US Dance Club Songs (Billboard)	3
US Hot R&B/Hip-Hop Songs (Billboard)	5
U.S. Billboard Hot Crossover 30	2
UK Singles (OCC)	69
U.S. Cash Box Top 100	5

=== Year-end charts ===
Chart (1988)	Position
United States (Billboard)	68
