= Private Number (The Jets song) =

Single by The Jets

from the album The Jets
- B-side: "Look, No Strings"
- Released: April 7, 1986
- Recorded: 1985
- Genre: R&B, pop
- Length: 4:03 (album); 3:37 (single)
- Label: MCA
- Songwriter(s): Jerry Knight and Aaron Zigman
- Producer(s): Don Powell, David Rivkin, Jerry Knight and Aaron Zigman

The Jets singles chronology
"Crush on You" (1986)	"Private Number" (1986)	"You Got It All" (1986)

"Private Number" is a song recorded by the pop band The Jets. It features on their 1985 debut album, The Jets and was released as the third single from the album in 1986.

== Music video ==
The music video for "Private Number" opens with someone dialing a telephone number in a phone booth. The Jets are then seen singing in an alley, and in front of an empty phone booth. At the end of the video, a piece of paper tumbles by, with a phone number written on it: 612-420-3226. For some time after this video was released, fans could call the "private number" and listen to pre-recorded messages from members of the Jets; lucky callers could even speak live to members.

== Chart performance ==
Chart (1986)	Peak position
US Billboard Hot 100	47
US Hot R&B/Hip-Hop Songs (Billboard)	28
