= You Got It All =

1986 single by the Jets

Single by the Jets

from the album The Jets
- B-side: "Burn the Candle"
- Released: August 2, 1986
- Recorded: 1985
- Genre: R&B; pop
- Length: 4:11 (album version); 4:22 (music video version)
- Label: MCA
- Songwriter: Rupert Holmes
- Producers: Don Powell; David Rivkin

The Jets singles chronology
"Private Number" (1986)	"You Got It All" (1986)	"Christmas in My Heart" (1986)

"You Got It All" is a song recorded by the American family band the Jets. It was released in 1986 as the fourth single from their debut album The Jets (1985). The song was written by Rupert Holmes, most famous for the 1979 hit "Escape (The Piña Colada Song)", and produced by David Rivkin and Don Powell (not the Slade drummer Don Powell.) Holmes wrote it for his 10-year-old daughter Wendy but she never got to hear it become a hit, as prior to its release she died suddenly of an undiagnosed brain tumor. The song features the second youngest member of the group, then-12-year-old Elizabeth Wolfgramm, on lead vocals.

"You Got It All" peaked at number 3 on the Billboard Hot 100 in the US in early 1987. The song also topped the Adult Contemporary chart for two weeks, and reached number 2 on the R&B chart. It was also featured in the film Jaws: The Revenge as well as 1987 episodes of the daytime soap operas Another World, As the World Turns, Days of Our Lives, and General Hospital. Britney Spears covered the song in 1997.

== Background ==
Jets members and sisters Moana and Elizabeth Wolfgramm were only aged 10 and 12 when they recorded their vocals for the song, and Elizabeth had difficulty connecting with the lyrics because she was too young to grasp the romantic feelings. The manager told her to imagine she was singing it to a puppy.

== Music video ==
The official music video was directed by Stephen E. Rivkin, the brother of song's producer, David Z. The video primarily takes place at a diner, with sisters Elizabeth, Moana, and Kathi as waitresses and their brothers as customers.

== Chart performance ==
=== Weekly charts ===
Chart (1986–87)	Peak position
Canada (The Record)	17
Canada RPM Top Singles	11
Canada RPM Adult Contemporary	3
UK Singles (Official Charts)	79
US Billboard Hot 100	3
US Adult Contemporary (Billboard)	1
US Hot R&B/Hip-Hop Songs (Billboard)	2
US Cash Box Top 100	6

=== Year-end charts ===
Chart (1987)	Rank
Canada RPM Top Singles	77
US Billboard Hot 100	43
US Adult Contemporary	14
US Cash Box	42

== Britney Spears version ==
"You Got It All"

Song by Britney Spears

from the album Oops!... I Did It Again
- Released: May 2000
- Recorded: 1997
- Studio: Battery Studios (New York, NY)
- Genre: Teen pop
- Length: 4:09
- Label: Jive
- Songwriter: Rupert Holmes
- Producer: Eric Foster White

=== Background ===
In 1997, Britney Spears started to work on her debut album ...Baby One More Time. After meeting up with producer Eric Foster White in August, the singer became familiar with the original version of "You've Got It All" by the Jets and decided to record a cover of the song. Steve Lunt, Jive's A&R vice president at the time, revealed that when the label's CEO "heard [the track] in the A&R meeting, he said, 'OK, we've got something.' Up until that, it was in doubt." "You Got It All" was originally intended to be released on Spears' first album as a bonus track, however, a re-recorded version of it was only released on certain international editions of Oops!... I Did It Again (2000) and Oops!...I Did It Again (Remixes and B-Sides) vinyl release.

=== Reception ===
A favorable review from CD Universe said, "The Jets' gem 'You've Got It All' shines brightly as ever with Britney's girlish allure. Take note, however, that Britney's not all bubbles—with an obvious influence from Mariah Carey, she glides quite ably through the key changes and delivers octave leaps and vibratos that should melt just about any heart, young or old."

=== Chart performance ===
Chart (2000)	Peak position
El Salvador (Notimex)	8
