= The Jets (Minnesota band) =

Tongan-American family band from Robbinsdale

- Born: The Wolfgramm Family
- Origin: Robbinsdale, Minnesota, U.S.
- Genres: Teen pop; dance-pop; R&B; freestyle; Minneapolis sound
- Years active: 1985–present
- Labels: MCA, Shadow Mountain, Liberty Park
- Members: LeRoy Wolfgramm; Eddie Wolfgramm; Haini Wolfgramm; Rudy Wolfgramm; Kathi Wolfgramm; Elizabeth Wolfgramm; Moana Wolfgramm
- Past members: Eugene Wolfgramm (deceased)
- Website: thejetsmusic.com

The Jets are a Tongan-American family band from Robbinsdale, a suburb of Minneapolis, Minnesota. The Jets are composed of brothers and sisters LeRoy, Eddie, Eugene, Haini, Rudy, Kathi, Elizabeth, and Moana Wolfgramm, who perform pop, R&B, and dance music. They started performing as a family band in 1977. The group enjoyed worldwide success in 1985–1990, performing three world tours, and producing five top-10 hits on the US Billboard Hot 100.

== Background ==
The original band consisted of the eight oldest children of Maikeli "Mike" and Vaké Wolfgramm, who were originally from Tonga. The family has 17 children: 15 by birth, and two, Eddie and Eugene, by adoption. The children attended Robbinsdale Cooper High School. The family are members of the Church of Jesus Christ of Latter-day Saints.

The band initially called themselves Quasar after a brand of television sets. They changed their name to The Jets, a name taken from the Elton John song "Bennie and the Jets", on the suggestion of manager Don Powell.

== Career ==
The original members of The Jets had a number of Billboard Hot 100 hits, five of which reached the top ten, including the 1986 single "Crush on You", which peaked at No. 3 in July 1986 (No. 5 UK, No. 4 US R&B, No. 4 US Dance). They are also known for the singles "You Got It All", "Cross My Broken Heart", "Rocket 2 U", and "Make It Real". "Sendin' All My Love", which peaked at No. 88 on the Hot 100, reached No. 1 on the Billboard dance chart.

"You Got It All" and "Make It Real", both ballads featuring lead vocals by Elizabeth Wolfgramm, were No. 1 hits on the Billboard adult contemporary chart. The band was nominated for a Grammy Award in 1988 for the song "Rocket 2 U" that featured lead vocals by Haini Wolfgramm. In 1989, The Jets performed the theme song for Chip 'n Dale Rescue Rangers.

The group performed "The Star-Spangled Banner" at the seventh game of the 1987 World Series, held in Minneapolis, and at game three of the 1991 Stanley Cup Final in suburban Bloomington. The band performed at the 1988 Summer Olympics in Seoul, South Korea and the 2002 Winter Olympics in Salt Lake City, Utah.

=== Recent appearances ===
- On October 10, 2009, seven of the original band members reunited to perform at the Mega 80s & 90s Music Festival in Honolulu, Hawaii along with fellow MCA recording artists Ready for the World, the Cover Girls, and En Vogue.
- On April 9, 2010, all of the original members except Eugene performed at the State Theatre in Minneapolis. It was billed as their 25th-anniversary reunion show.
- In 2015, the band celebrated its 30th anniversary with performances in Manila and Cebu, Philippines.
- In July 2015 in Orem, Utah, The Jets performed a hometown concert with Debbie Gibson.
- The Jets were featured on the TV One music documentary Unsung on March 17, 2019.
- In 2021, the original drummer Rudy produced a documentary called "The Jets: Making It Real" with the help of director Kels Goodman, who also produced the YouTube sensation "Will it Blend".

== Line-up ==
The Jets' original lineup consisted of eight of the siblings.

- LeRoy Wolfgramm (born July 19, 1965) – vocals, guitar
- Eddie Wolfgramm (né Lavatai) (born August 14, 1966) – vocals, tenor saxophone, assorted percussion, additional keyboards
- Eugene Wolfgramm (né Hunt) (born September 24, 1967; died April 15, 2024) – vocals, assorted percussion, alto saxophone
- Haini Wolfgramm (born January 25, 1968) – vocals, bass
- Rudy Wolfgramm (born March 1, 1969) – vocals, drums, percussion, choreography
- Kathi Wolfgramm (born September 6, 1970) – vocals, keyboards, additional percussion
- Elizabeth Wolfgramm (born August 19, 1972) – vocals, additional keyboards and percussion
- Moana Wolfgramm (born October 13, 1973) – vocals, additional keyboards and percussion

=== Spin-off ===
In 1988, Eugene Wolfgramm (who reverted to his birth name of Eugene Hunt) and Joe Pasquale formed the duo Boys Club, which recorded for MCA Records. Boys Club released the song "I Remember Holding You", which reached No. 8 on the Hot 100. Eugene reunited for the 1990 album The Best of the Jets (1990), but he and other siblings (Eddie, Elizabeth, Kathi) eventually left the band in succession. Eugene Wolfgramm died on April 15, 2024, at the age of 56.

The band was featured on the soundtrack for The Disney Afternoon, on which they performed the Chip 'n Dale Rescue Rangers theme song. They appeared on the soundtracks for Burglar (1987) ("Tough Guys"), Beverly Hills Cop II (1987) ("Cross My Broken Heart"), The Karate Kid Part III ("Under Any Moon"), and The Family Man (2000) ("La La Means I Love You").

== Influence ==
In 1997, American pop singer Britney Spears recorded a new version of "You Got It All", which appears on international editions of her 2000 album Oops!... I Did It Again. Musical artists Arnee Hidalgo, Pinay, and MYMP have also covered the song. "Crush on You" is featured as the base sample for the French house anthem "Intro" by Alan Braxe and Fred Falke (2000).

Pop singer Aaron Carter included "Crush on You" on his first album, which became a top-10 single in Australia, Germany, and the United Kingdom in 1997. Singer Nayobe recorded a version of "Make It Real" that became a hit in Latin America. Exposé recorded a version of "The Same Love" on their 1992 self-titled album. More recently, the UK electronic music act Nero sampled "Crush on You" on their 2011 track of the same title.

== The Jets and The Jets Original Family Band ==
As of 2022, there are two touring groups of Jets, which include original members:

- The Jets: Elizabeth, Eddie, Kathi, Moana
- The Jets Original Family Band: Haini, LeRoy, Rudy

== Discography ==
=== Studio albums ===
Year	Album	Peak chart positions				Certifications	Record label
Year	Album	US	US R&B	CAN	UK	Certifications	Record label
1985	The Jets	21	16	77	57	RIAA: Platinum	MCA
1986	Christmas with The Jets	—	—	—	—		MCA
1987	Magic	35	26	—	—	RIAA: Gold	MCA
1989	Believe	107	74	—	—		MCA
1995	Love People	—	—	—	—		Liberty Park
1997	Love Will Lead the Way	—	—	—	—		Shadow Mountain
1998	Then & Now	—	—	—	—		Cold Front
2006	Versatility	—	—	—	—		Hip-O
2014	Reunited	—	—	—	—		Refinement Records
"—" denotes a recording that did not chart or was not released in that territory.

=== Live albums ===
Year	Album details
2007	Greatest Hits Live: Released: June 26, 2007; Label: Sbme Special Mkts

=== Compilation albums ===
Year	Album details
1990	The Best of The Jets: Released: November 27, 1990; Label: MCA
2001	20th Century Masters – The Millennium Collection: The Best of The Jets: Released: October 9, 2001; Label: MCA
2004	Greatest Hits: Released: August 8, 2004; Label: K-tel

=== Singles ===
Year	Single	Peak chart positions									Album
Year	Single	US	US R&B	US Dan	US A/C	AUS	CAN	NLD	NZ	UK	Album
1985	"Curiosity"	—	8	21	—	—	—	—	23	41	The Jets
1986	"Crush on You"	3	4	4	—	—	9	—	43	5	The Jets
1986	"Private Number"	47	28	—	—	—	—	—	—	—	The Jets
1986	"You Got It All"	3	2	—	1	—	11	—	—	79	The Jets
1987	"Cross My Broken Heart"	7	11	8	—	—	17	—	32	—	Magic
1987	"I Do You"	20	19	—	—	—	68	—	—	—	Magic
1988	"Rocket 2 U"	6	5	3	—	79	12	90	—	69	Magic
1988	"Make It Real"	4	24	—	1	—	6	—	—	—	Magic
1988	"Anytime"	—	—	—	35	—	—	—	—	—	Magic
1988	"Sendin' All My Love"	88	72	1	—	—	—	—	—	—	Magic
1989	"You Better Dance"	59	73	28	—	—	—	—	—	—	Believe
1989	"The Same Love"	87	—	—	15	—	—	—	—	—	Believe
1990	"Somebody to Love Me"	—	—	—	—	—	—	—	—	—	Believe
1990	"Under Any Moon" (re-issue)	—	—	—	—	—	—	—	—	—	Believe
1990	"Special Kinda Love"	—	83	—	—	—	—	—	—	—	The Best of The Jets
1991	"Forever in My Life"	—	—	—	—	—	—	—	—	—	The Best of The Jets
"—" denotes a recording that did not chart or was not released in that territory.

== Tours ==
- 1985–1986: The Jets World Tour
- 1986: Christmas with The Jets World Tour
- 1987–1988: Magic World Tour
- 1989: Believe World Tour
- 2015: The Jets - 30th Anniversary Concert
