= David Z (producer) =

American music producer (1948–2026)

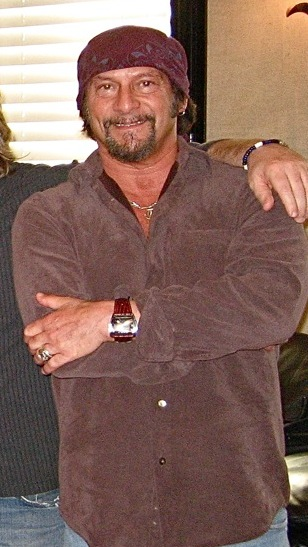
- David Z in 2008

Background information
- Born: David Bruce Rivkin; March 25, 1948
- Origin: Minneapolis, Minnesota, U.S.
- Died: August 2, 2026 (aged 78) Burbank, California, U.S.
- Genres: Rock, funk, pop rock
- Occupations: Record producer, songwriter, audio engineer
- Instruments: Drum machine, guitar, piano
- Years active: 1969–2025

David Bruce Rivkin (March 25, 1948 – August 2, 2026), known professionally as David Z, was an American record producer, engineer and songwriter from Minneapolis, Minnesota. He is best known for his long-standing work with Prince and contributed to albums by Etta James, Billy Idol, BoDeans, Buddy Guy, and Neneh Cherry. He is considered to be an architect of the Minneapolis sound.

Rivkin was a member of Lipps Inc, with whom he had a U.S. number-one and UK number two hit with "Funkytown" (1980). He produced Fine Young Cannibals' "She Drives Me Crazy" (1988), creating the song's signature snare drum sound.

== Background ==
David Rivkin was the eldest of three brothers who have all worked in media entertainment. His youngest brother, Bobby Z., was the original drummer in Prince's band The Revolution. His middle brother, Stephen E. Rivkin, is notable for his work as a film editor, particularly as editor of the Pirates of the Caribbean trilogy of films and Avatar.

== Early work ==
After spending much of his teenage years in a variety of local rock and roll bands around Minneapolis, David Z spent time between Minneapolis and Los Angeles throughout the early 1970s songwriting and engineering. His early work is perhaps most known over this period in his writing contributions for Gram Parsons' first solo album, GP, particularly the track "How Much I've Lied", before going on to play a major role in establishing the Minneapolis sound. Not only that, but through his innovative use of drum machines, loops, and samples much of his production aesthetic is now synonymous with music from the 1980s. Many musical collaborations were produced by David Z at Paisley Park throughout the late 1980s and 1990s.

== Work with Prince ==
During the mid-1970s, David Z encountered Prince playing around the Minneapolis scene. The pair recorded a set of demos with Z engineering which ultimately led to Prince signing a recording deal with Warner Bros. Records. Although much of the detail of David Z's exact contributions to Prince's albums is lost in the myth surrounding Prince and his prolific writing and recording, it is clear that his input, recording technique and production are intertwined intrinsically into those recordings. His most well-documented contributions to Prince's folio of work are his writing, production and engineering on the 1986 hit "Kiss"—originally a song given to the band Mazarati by Prince for their debut album, which David Z was producing—and his recording and engineering of Purple Rain.

== Soundtrack work ==
David Z continued to work successfully in the field of film soundtracks and scoring. Aside from his early work with Prince on Purple Rain and Under the Cherry Moon, David Z's work can be heard on the 1996 John Travolta film Michael directed by Nora Ephron, where he produced songs by Al Green and Kenny Wayne Shepherd. His songs with Tevin Campbell "Stand Out" and "I 2 I" are featured in Disney's film A Goofy Movie.

== Death ==
Rivkin died from complications of an infection at a hospital in Burbank, California, on August 2, 2026, at the age of 78.
