= Teena Marie discography =

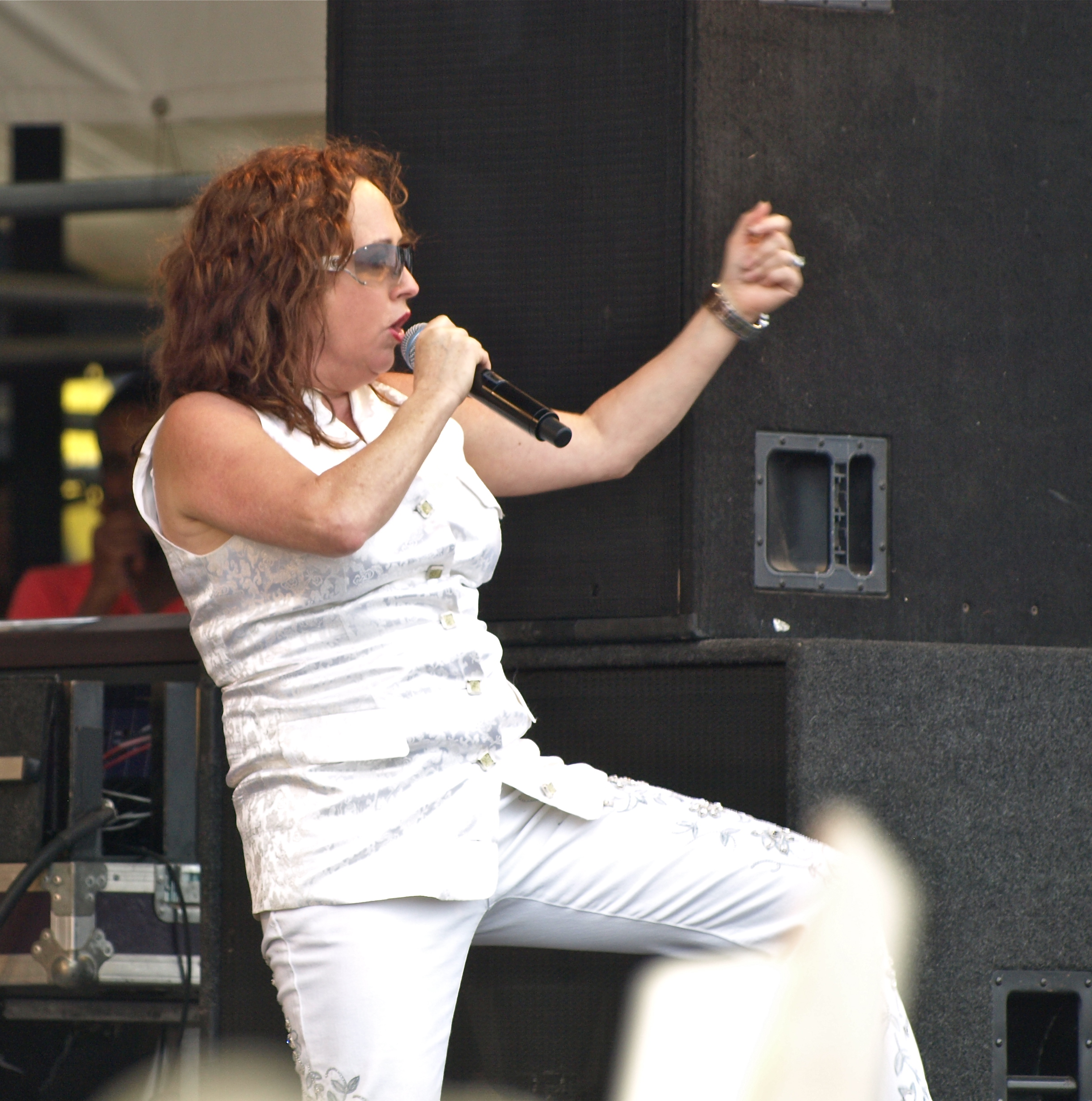
- Studio albums: 14
- Compilation albums: 13
- Singles: 35

The discography of Teena Marie, an American R&B and soul singer, consists of 14 studio albums, 13 compilation albums, and 35 singles since her debut album Wild and Peaceful in 1979. She has been awarded with two gold albums and has 6 top-ten albums and 7 top-ten singles on the United States R&B charts.

== Albums ==
=== Studio albums ===
Year	Album	Peak chart positions			Certifications	Record label
Year	Album	US	US R&B	CAN	Certifications	Record label
1979	Wild and Peaceful	94	18	—		Gordy
1980	Lady T	45	18	—		Gordy
1980	Irons in the Fire	38	9	—		Gordy
1981	It Must Be Magic	23	2	—	RIAA: Gold	Gordy
1983	Robbery	119	13	—		Epic
1984	Starchild	31	9	90	RIAA: Gold	Epic
1986	Emerald City	81	20	—		Epic
1988	Naked to the World	65	15	—		Epic
1990	Ivory	132	27	—		Epic
1994	Passion Play	—	—	—		Sarai
2004	La Doña	6	3	—		Cash Money
2006	Sapphire	24	3	—		Cash Money
2009	Congo Square	20	4	—		Stax
2013	Beautiful	63	13	—		UM^{e}
"—" denotes a recording that did not chart or was not released in that territory.

=== Compilation albums ===
Charting compilations

Year	Album	Peak	Record label
Year	Album	US R&B	Record label
2011	Playlist: The Very Best of Teena Marie	56	Legacy

Complete list

- Greatest Hits (1985, Motown)
- Greatest Hits (1991, Epic)
- I Need Your Lovin': The Best of Teena Marie (1994, Motown)
- Motown Milestones: The Best of Teena Marie (1996, Motown)
- Lovergirl: The Teena Marie Story (1997, Epic)
- Love Songs (2000, Sony Music)
- Ultimate Collection (2000, Hip-O)
- 20th Century Masters – The Millennium Collection: The Best of Teena Marie (2001, Motown)
- Super Hits (2002, Legacy)
- Icon (2011, Motown)
- Playlist: The Very Best of Teena Marie (2011, Legacy)
- First Class Love: Rare Tee (2011, Hip-O Select)
- John Morales presents Teena Marie – Love Songs & Funky Beats, Remixed with Loving Devotion (2021, BBE)

== Singles ==
Year	Single	Peak chart positions					Album
Year	Single	US	US R&B	US Dan	CAN	UK	Album
1979	"I'm a Sucker for Your Love" ^{[A]}	102	8	—	—	43	Wild and Peaceful
1979	"Don't Look Back"	—	91	—	—	—	Wild and Peaceful
1980	"Can It Be Love"	—	57	—	—	—	Lady T
1980	"Behind the Groove"	—	21	4	—	6	Lady T
1980	"Lonely Desire"	—	—	—	—	—	Lady T
1980	"I Need Your Lovin'"	37	9	2	—	28	Irons in the Fire
1981	"Young Love"	—	41	—	—	—	Irons in the Fire
1981	"Square Biz"	50	3	12	—	—	It Must Be Magic
1981	"It Must Be Magic"	—	30	12	—	—	It Must Be Magic
1981	"Portuguese Love"	—	54	—	—	—	It Must Be Magic
1983	"Fix It"	—	21	41	—	—	Robbery
1983	"Midnight Magnet"	—	36	—	—	—	Robbery
1984	"Dear Lover"	—	77	—	—	—	Robbery
1984	"Lovergirl"	4	9	6	13	76	Starchild
1985	"Jammin'"	81	45	—	—	—	Starchild
1985	"Out on a Limb"	—	56	—	—	—	Starchild
1985	"14K"	—	87	—	—	—	The Goonies
1986	"Lips to Find You"	—	28	—	—	—	Emerald City
1986	"Love Me Down Easy"	—	76	—	—	—	Emerald City
1986	"Lead Me On"	—	—	—	—	—	Top Gun
1988	"Ooo La La La"	85	1	—	—	74	Naked to the World
1988	"Work It"	—	10	—	—	—	Naked to the World
1988	"Surrealistic Pillow"	—	—	—	—	—	Naked to the World
1989	"Bad Boy"	—	—	—	—	—	Tap
1990	"Here's Looking at You"	—	11	—	—	—	Ivory
1990	"If I Were a Bell"	—	8	—	—	—	Ivory
1990	"Since Day One"	—	—	—	—	69	Ivory
1991	"Just Us Two"	—	42	—	—	—	Ivory
1994	"Warm as Momma's Oven"	—	123	—	—	—	Passion Play
2004	"Still in Love" (with Baby)	70	23	—	—	—	La Doña
2004	"A Rose by Any Other Name" (with Gerald Levert)	97	53	—	—	—	La Doña
2006	"Ooh Wee"	125	32	—	—	—	Sapphire
2009	"Can't Last a Day" (with Faith Evans)	—	41	—	—	—	Congo Square
2009	"You Baby"	—	100	—	—	—	Congo Square
2012	"Luv Letter"	—	—	—	—	—	Beautiful
"—" denotes a recording that did not chart or was not released in that territory.

Notes

- ^{A} Rick James sang uncredited co-lead vocals on "I'm a Sucker for Your Love".
