= Ernie Fields Jr. =

American baritone saxophonist (1934–2024)

- Born: July 29, 1934; Tulsa, Oklahoma, U.S.
- Died: March 8, 2024 (aged 89) Pasadena, California, U.S.
- Genres: Film score, jazz
- Occupations: Musician, composer

Ernie Fields Jr. (July 29, 1934 – March 8, 2024) was an American baritone saxophonist and session musician.

Son of notable musician Ernie Fields, he worked with blues, soul and funk artists including B. B. King, Bobby Bland, Stevie Wonder, Aretha Franklin, Rick James, and Marvin Gaye.

Fields graduated from Booker T. Washington High School in 1951 and then attended Howard University, playing with his father's band during breaks. In the 1990s he began touring with trombonist Fred Wesley, playing bagpipes as well as saxophone.

Fields wrote the score for the 1978 film Disco Godfather.

On the April 6, 2010 episode of American Idol, Fields played the didgeridoo during Crystal Bowersox's performance of the Lennon and McCartney composition "Come Together".

Ernie Fields Jr. was music contractor for American Idol, The Voice, and X Factor.

Fields lived in Pasadena, California. He died in his sleep on March 8, 2024, at the age of 89.

== Discography ==
- 1978: Here, My Dear – Marvin Gaye
- 1978: Ride a Wild Horse - Motown Special Disco Version Single – Ernie Fields Jr.
- 1979: Wild and Peaceful – Teena Marie
- 1995: Conversation Peace – Stevie Wonder
- 2008: One Kind Favor – B. B. King

2013	Made in California	The Beach Boys	Saxophone
2012	Ladies and Gentlemen, Mr. B.B. King	B.B. King	Sax (Baritone)
2011	A Woman Falling Out of Love	Aretha Franklin	Contractor
2010	American Idol: Season 9		Music Contractor, Flute, Saxophone
2010	Mainstream Straight-Ahead	Stix Hooper	Sax (Baritone)
2009	American Idol Season 8		Woodwind
2009	You Fooled Me/Prime Time	Grey & Hanks	Saxophone
2008	One Kind Favor	B.B. King	Sax (Baritone)
2007	The Heat of the Blues	Albert King	Main Personnel, Flute, Saxophone
2006	It's Never Too Late	Marla Gibbs	Woodwind, Contractor
2006	Milestone Profiles	Jimmy Smith	Sax (Baritone)
2005	A Time to Love	Stevie Wonder	Contractor
2005	Genius & Friends	Ray Charles	Contractor
2005	Ma Vérité	Johnny Hallyday	Production Executive
2005	Shelter in the Rain	Stevie Wonder	Contractor
2004	Reflections Of	Lamont Dozier	Production Arrangement
2003	Portrait	Paul Cacia	Saxophone
2003	The Opening Act	Paul Cacia	Saxophone
2003	Wuda Cuda Shuda	Fred Wesley	Flute, Bagpipes, Sax (Alto), Sax (Tenor), Horn Arrangements, Group Member, Composer
2002	An American Original	Lamont Dozier	Production Arrangement
2001	Fourever	The Four Tops	Saxophone
2001	The Cosmic Storyteller	Unicorn	Saxophone
2000	Live from the Nation's Capital	Buddy Collette	Woodwind
1998	VH1 Divas Live		Saxophone, Contractor, Music Contractor
1997	A Dramatic Christmas: The Very Best Christmas Of All	The Dramatics	Sax (Tenor)
1997	Teen Beat, Vol. 4		Performer
1997	The Very Best of Diane Schuur	Diane Schuur	Saxophone
1996	Groovy, Vol. 1: A Collection of Rare Jazzy Club Tracks		Saxophone
1996	Surrender to Jonathan	Jonathan Richman	Horn
1995	Conversation Peace	Stevie Wonder	Sax (Tenor)
1995	Jamie/Guyden Story		Performer
1995	The Master 1961-1984	Marvin Gaye	Sax (Alto)
1994	The Best of Parlet	Parlet	Horn
1993	Caché	Kirk Whalum	Sax (Baritone)
1993	Get the Feeling	Two Tons o' Fun	Horn
1993	Miki Sings Billie: A Tribute to Billie Holiday	Miki Howard	Contractor
1993	Reggae Ambassadors: 20th Anniversary Collection	Third World	Sax (Alto), Sax (Baritone)
1993	Sum Serious Blues	Jimmy Smith	Sax (Baritone)
1993	The Best of Third World	Third World	Sax (Alto), Sax (Baritone)
1993	The Ultimate Collection	Albert King	Saxophone
1992	Worthy	Rodney Friend	Horn
1991	Atlantic Blues [Box]		Sax (Tenor)
1991	Burnin'	Patti LaBelle	Saxophone
1991	Pure Schuur	Diane Schuur	Saxophone
1990	Dingo [Motion Picture Soundtrack]	Miles Davis / Michel Legrand	Music Consultant
1989	Higher Ground	Vernessa Mitchell	String Contractor, Horn Conductor
1987	Katt Walk	Kathy Mathis	Horn
1986	Atlantic Blues: Vocalists		Sax (Tenor)
1985	More than Music	Phil & Brenda Nicholas	Contractor
1984	Ladies & the Babies	Frankie Lee	Sax (Tenor)
1983	All the Way Strong	Third World	Sax (Alto), Sax (Baritone)
1983	On the Line	Michael Wycoff	String Contractor
1982	Love Changes	O.C. Smith	Saxophone
1981	Swing Street Cafe	Joe Sample / David T. Walker	Main Personnel, Horn
1981	This Kind of Lovin'	The Whispers	Saxophone
1980	Aretha	Aretha Franklin	Horn Arrangements
1980	Night Song	Ahmad Jamal	Sax (Baritone)
197?	On Our Way	Teegarden & VanWinkle	Horn
1979	Bustin' Out of L Seven	Rick James	Saxophone
1979	Happy Holidays to You	The Whispers	Sax (Baritone)
1979	Til Tomorrow Comes	Raul de Souza	Saxophone
1979	Wild and Peaceful	Teena Marie	Saxophone
1978	Acting Up	Marlena Shaw	Contractor, Copyist
1978	Here, My Dear	Marvin Gaye	Sax (Alto)
1978	We Meet Again	Martha Reeves	Flute
1977	Bundle of Joy	Freddie Hubbard	Sax (Baritone)
1976	Albert	Albert King	Flute, Saxophone
1976	Yesterday's Dreams	Alphonso Johnson	Flute, Saxophone, Sax (Baritone)
1973	Let's Get It On	Marvin Gaye	Copyist
	Dependable	Charles Drain	Flute, Sax (Baritone)
	Joue Pas de Rock'n'roll Pour Moi	Johnny Hallyday	Sax (Baritone)
	Quelque chose de Tennessee	Johnny Hallyday	Sax (Baritone)

== Selected filmography ==
2013	A Home For The Holidays With Celine Dion	Music Contractor
2012	The 63rd Primetime Emmy Awards	Music Contractor
2012	X Factor	Music Coordinator
