= La Doña (album) =

Studio album by Teena Marie
- Released: May 11, 2004
- Recorded: 2002–04
- Genres: R&B; soul; hip hop
- Length: 77:18
- Labels: Cash Money; Universal
- Producer: Teena Marie

Teena Marie chronology
Passion Play (1994)	La Doña (2004)	Sapphire (2006)

La Doña is the eleventh studio album by Teena Marie, released on May 11, 2004, by Cash Money Records and Universal Records.

The album includes guest contributions from Rick James ("I Got You" - this was the last recording James made before his death), Gerald Levert ("A Rose by Any Other Name"), Common ("Revelations 3:8 Introduction"), Birdman ("Off the Chain"), MC Lyte ("The Mackin' Game") and Marie's daughter, Alia Rose.

The album peaked at #6 on the Billboard 200, Marie's highest placing (and first top 20 entry) on that chart. It also reached #3 on the R&B Albums chart.

The lead-off single "Still in Love" (which samples Al Green's 1972 track "What a Wonderful Thing Love Is") was Marie's first Top 30 hit on the US Hot R&B Singles chart for 14 years, peaking at #23. It was nominated for a Grammy Award in 2005 in the category Best Female R&B Vocal Performance.

The follow-up single "A Rose By Any Other Name", a duet with Gerald Levert peaked at #53 on the US Hot R&B Singles chart.

She performed "My Body's Hungry" on The Parkers in 2000.

== Track listing ==
All songs written by Teena Marie, except where noted.

1. "La Doña Intro" – 2:15
2. "Still In Love" (Al Green, Marie, Byron Thomas) – 4:16
3. "Honey Call" (Marie, Pamela Williams) – 4:21
4. "Baby I'm Your Fiend" (James Allen, Marie) – 4:56
5. "My Body's Hungry" – 5:33
6. "A Rose by Any Other Name" with Gerald Levert – 5:27
7. "Off the Chain" – 4:37 Performed by Teena Marie and Birdman
8. "Makavelli Never Lied" (Allen, Marie) – 5:06
9. "Revelations 3:8 Introduction" (Common, Marie) – 0:30 Performed by Teena Marie and Common
10. "Recycle Hate to Love" – 4:52 Performed by Teena Marie, Lady Levi and Alia Rose
11. "The Mackin' Game" (Allen, Marie, MC Lyte, Medusa) – 5:34 Performed by Teena Marie, MC Lyte and Medusa
12. "I Love Him Too" – 5:28 Performed by Teena Marie and DeDe O'Neal
13. "I Got You" (Rick James, Marie) – 4:21 Performed by Teena Marie and Rick James
14. "Hit Me Where I Live" (Allen, Doug Grigsby, Marie) – 5:05
15. "High Yellow Girl" – 4:58 Performed by Teena Marie and Alia Rose
16. "Black Rain" – 4:27
17. "I'm on Fire" – 5:32

== Charts ==
=== Weekly charts ===
Chart (2004)	Peak position
US Billboard 200	6
US Top R&B/Hip-Hop Albums (Billboard)	3

=== Year-end charts ===
Chart (2004)	Position
US Top R&B/Hip-Hop Albums (Billboard)	34
