= Irons in the Fire =

Studio album by Teena Marie
- Released: August 14, 1980
- Recorded: 1979–80
- Studios: Motown/Hitsville, Hollywood, California
- Genres: Dance; R&B
- Length: 43:41
- Label: Gordy
- Producer: Teena Marie

Teena Marie chronology
Lady T (1980)	Irons in the Fire (1980)	It Must Be Magic (1981)

Irons in the Fire is the third studio album by American singer-songwriter Teena Marie, released on August 14, 1980, by Motown. Her first self produced effort, it was dedicated to her father, Thomas Leslie Brockert (1919–1976). It received positive reviews on its release. In a 2009 interview she named it as her personal favourite of all her albums.

== Reception ==
Professional ratings
Review scores
Source	Rating
AllMusic	4/5 stars
Robert Christgau	C+
Pitchfork	9.0/10
Spin Alternative Record Guide	5/10

Irons in the Fire peaked at #9 on the Black Albums chart and #38 on the Pop Albums chart. Lead single "I Need Your Lovin'" peaked at #9 on the US Black Singles chart and became her first Top 40 hit on the Billboard Hot 100, peaking at #37. It also reached #28 in the United Kingdom, making it Marie's second and last top 30 single in that country. In addition, along with the track "Chains", "I Need Your Lovin'" peaked at number two for two weeks on the dance charts. "Young Love" was released as the album's second single, peaking just outside the top 40 on the US Black Singles chart.

== Track listing ==
All songs were written by Teena Marie, except where noted.

1. "I Need Your Lovin'" – 7:31
2. "Young Love" – 5:29
3. "First Class Love" – 5:06
4. "Irons in the Fire" – 3:33
5. "Chains" – 7:11
6. "You Make Love Like Springtime" – 4:59
7. "Tune in Tomorrow" (Mickey Hearn, Marie) – 6:26
8. "You Make Love Like Springtime (Reprise)" – 3:26

Bonus tracks – 2011 Expanded Edition

1. "You Make Love Like Springtime (Reprise)" (Extended) – 5:23 (replaces track 8)
2. "I'm a Sucker for Your Love' (Live)" – 8:35
3. "I Need Your Lovin' (Live)" – 5:31
4. "Someday We'll All Be Free (Live)" – 2:26
5. "Deja Vu (Live)" – 10:38
6. "Square Biz (Live)" – 6:29
7. "Gigolette" (Ozone) — 6:44
8. “ "I Need Your Lovin'(West End Mix)" — 6:29

== Personnel ==
- James S. Stewart, Jr. – Piano, Electric Piano
- David Taylor, Greg Hargrove, Wali Ali – Electric Guitar
- Nick Brown – Acoustic Guitar
- Michael Boddicker – Synthesizer
- Bobby Lyle – Piano
- Allen McGrier, James Jamerson – Bass
- Paul Hines, Earl Palmer – Drums
- Paulinho da Costa – Percussion, Congas
- Thomas "T" Bumpass – Trumpet, Flugelhorn
- William Carroll White, Jr. – Alto Saxophone
- Ray C. Woodard – Tenor Saxophone
- Lloyd Lindroth – Harp
- Jill Jones, Mickey Hearn, Shirley Mattison, Ozone – Backing Vocals
- Paul Riser – string arrangements

Technical

- Bobby Brooks – engineer
- Ginny Livingston, Johnny Lee – art direction
- Ron Slenzak – photography

== Charts ==
=== Weekly charts ===
Chart (1980)	Peak position
US Billboard 200	37
US Top R&B/Hip-Hop Albums (Billboard)	9

=== Year-end charts ===
Chart (1981)	Position
US Top R&B/Hip-Hop Albums (Billboard)	48

=== Singles ===
Year	Single	Chart positions			
Year	Single	US	US R&B	US Dance	UK (OCC)
1980	"I Need Your Lovin'"	37	9	2	28
1981	"Young Love"	—	41	—	—

== Covers ==
In 2000, pop singer Sheena Easton covered "I Need Your Lovin'" as a bonus track on her retro Disco covers album Fabulous for the Japanese market. The Cover Girls, Lisa Lisa and Cult Jam and Curiosity Killed the Cat have also covered the song.
