= Ron Slenzak =

American photographer (born 1948)

- Born: Ronald J. Slenzak; January 29, 1948 (age 78)
- Education: ArtCenter College of Design
- Known for: Photography
- Awards: Catalog Awards, Key Art, One Show, Western Art Directors Club

Ronald J. Slenzak (born January 29, 1948) is an American photographer, best known for photographing record album covers. Some of the album covers that he has photographed include Spitfire (Jefferson Starship), Huey Lewis and the News (their self-titled debut album), It Must Be Magic (Teena Marie), Dreams (Grace Slick), Throwin' Down (Rick James) and Beat Street (Prism).

== Biography ==
Slenzak was born on January 29, 1948.

In the 1970s, he became one of the most sought after photographers of album covers. Throughout a career that spans nearly four decades, Slenzak has photographed album covers for a wide range of recording acts including Huey Lewis and the News, Jefferson Starship and numerous Motown artists.

Other clients include: Disney, Fox Family Channel, Paramount Pictures, Sony Entertainment, Twentieth Century-Fox and Warner Brothers Television.

Currently, Slenzak is based in Venice, California. He is a member of the faculty at Art Center College of Design in Pasadena, California.

== Selected Album Cover credits ==
Album	Artist or Group	Label
Alfie	Alfie	Motown
Romance in the Night	José Feliciano	Motown
Sam Harris	Sam Harris	Motown
Sam-I-Am	Sam Harris	Motown
Frenzy	High Inergy	Gordy
Hold On	High Inergy	Gordy
Throwin' Down	Rick James	Gordy
Spitfire	Jefferson Starship	Grunt/RCA
Kagny & the Dirty Rats	Kagny & the Dirty Rats	Motown
KoKo-PoP	Koko-PoP	Motown
Secrets of Lonely Boys	KoKo-PoP	Motown
Huey Lewis and the News	Huey Lewis and the News	Chrysalis
It Must Be Magic	Teena Marie	Gordy
Mary Jane Girls	Mary Jane Girls	Gordy
Just for You	The McCrarys	Capitol
Second To Nunn	Bobby Nunn	Motown
The Right Choice	The Right Choice	Motown
The Genie	Rockwell	Motown
Dreams	Grace Slick	RCA
Beat Street	Prism	Capitol
You Told Your Mama Not to Worry	Hugh Masekela	Casablanca Records
