= Congo Square (album) =

Studio album by Teena Marie
- Released: June 9, 2009
- Recorded: 2008–09
- Genres: R&B; soul; neo-jazz; funk; adult contemporary
- Length: 73:39
- Labels: Stax; Concord
- Producers: Teena Marie; Doug Grigsby; Terri Lyne Carrington

Teena Marie chronology
Sapphire (2006)	Congo Square (2009)	Beautiful (2013)

Singles from Congo Square
- 1. "Can't Last a Day" Released: 2009

Congo Square is the thirteenth studio album by American singer and songwriter Teena Marie. Released in the United States on June 9, 2009, it would be her only album for the revived Stax label and the final album released before her death in late December 2010.

Congo Square peaked at #4 on the US R&B Albums chart and #20 on the Billboard 200. Lead single "Can't Last a Day", a duet with Faith Evans, peaked at #41 on the US R&B singles chart, followed by "You Baby". The album features collaborations with Teena Marie's daughter Alia Rose—who records under the name of Rose LeBeau—and rapper MC Lyte, as well as Faith Evans, George Duke, Howard Hewett and Shirley Murdock.

== Background ==
The album title references Congo Square, in the Tremé in New Orleans, an area in which, during times of slavery, slaves were "allowed to dance and sing in the wardrobe of their mother country on Sundays." Teena Marie said of the album:

"I've been through quite a few trials and tribulations over the last two years. I spent many of those hours in prayer and felt like God was putting his arms around me. I started thinking about the music I grew up on—how inspired it was. Each song I was coming up with began to sound like the style of some favorite artist of mine from the past... Curtis Mayfield and Marvin Gaye, Billie Holliday, the old Chicago soul of The Emotions and the new Chicago vibe of Kanye West... Ice Cube's bumpin' in the trunk vibe and of course, Rick James. It's all in there."

Teena Marie also expressed her appreciation for Faith Evans, saying, "I've always loved Faith and her vocal style. She reminds me of me. Her correlation with Biggie—having a career with him and without him—reminds me of me and Rick [James]. I feel like she's a younger me. Of the younger ladies, she's the one I love most."

== Critical reception ==
Professional ratings
Review scores
Source	Rating
About.com	3.5/5 stars
Allmusic	4/5 stars
USA Today	3/4 stars
Slant	3.5/5 stars
Philadelphia Inquirer	3/5 stars

Elysa Gardner of USA Today, in a 3/4 star review proclaimed, "The soul survivor gives praise to mature virtues here: stability, dignity, faith and, yes, love. Of course, with her spiced-honey vocals and guests such as George Duke, Howard Hewett, Faith Evans and MC Lyte, Lady T can't help but bring a sensual edge to the socially and spiritually conscious material."

Eric Henderson of Slant in a 3.5/5 star review wrote, "Marie’s album, which was in part inspired by her newfound connection with her New Orleans roots, is unforced, breezy, and utterly comfortable in its own skin. While she doesn’t shy away from co-opting trendy production flourishes (yes, she Auto-Tunes in “Milk n’ Honey”) and slightly less trendy collaborations (MC Lyte, Faith Evans, George Duke), there’s something extremely settled and comforting about Congo Square that makes up for what it loses in pop-culture primacy."

Andy Kellman of Allmusic in a 4/5 star review exclaimed, "Inspired by discovering that some of her family roots are in New Orleans, a city with which she has long felt a deep spiritual connection, Teena Marie frames Congo Square around the Crescent City...Like her two prior albums, Congo Square is a long, sprawling set of songs with plenty of room left for guests who share, never steal, the spotlight...What is most remarkable about Congo Square is how Marie continues to fly around in her private orbit, indulging her ambitious whims, while sounding every bit contemporary."

Doug Wallen of the Philadelphia Inquirer, in a 3/5 star review noted, "A slinky R&B affair at once retro and modern, it opens with duets with MC Lyte and Faith Evans. Marie wrote, produced, and contributed guitar, keys, or percussion to every song, her famously soul-informed vocals still dripping with confidence. Aside from bold come-ons and fraught cooing, Marie here looks to Aretha Franklin and Sarah Vaughan for inspiration, while the New Orleans-set title track lingers on jazz heroes."

== Track listing ==
All songs written by Teena Marie, except where noted.

1. "The Pressure" (featuring MC Lyte) (Marie, James Allen, Doug Grigsby) – 5:32
2. "Can't Last a Day" (featuring Faith Evans) – 5:05
3. "Baby I Love You" (Marie, Nairobi Williams) – 4:57
4. "Ear Candy 101" – 4:48 (Ben Del Giorgio, Doug Grigsby)
5. "Lover's Lane" (featuring Howard Hewett) – 5:07
6. "Marry Me" – 5:31
7. "You Baby" – 4:15
8. "Milk N' Honey" (featuring Gail Gotti and Rose LeBeau) (Marie, Rose LeBeau) – 5:26
9. "What U Got 4 Me" (Marie, Allen) – 4:42
10. "Rovleta's Jass" – 0:31
11. "Congo Square" (featuring George Duke) – 4:55
12. "Harlem Blues" – 5:17
13. "Black Cool" – 1:59
14. "Ms. Coretta" – 5:19
15. "Soldier Boy" (featuring Shirley Murdock) – 4:25
16. "The Rose N' Thorn" – 5:30

== Charts ==
=== Weekly charts ===
Chart (2009)	Peak position
US Billboard 200	20
US Top R&B/Hip-Hop Albums (Billboard)	4

=== Year-end charts ===
Chart (2009)	Position
US Top R&B/Hip-Hop Albums (Billboard)	87

== Singles ==
Year	Single	Chart positions	
Year	Single	U.S. R&B	U.S. Adult R&B
2009	"Can't Last a Day" (featuring Faith Evans)	41	14
2009	"You Baby"	100	—
