= Starchild (Teena Marie album) =

Studio album by Teena Marie
- Released: November 11, 1984
- Recorded: 1983–84
- Studio: Ocean Way Recording and A&M Studios (Hollywood, California); Sound Castle Recorders, Westlake Audio and Mad Hatter Studios (Los Angeles, California); The Automatt (San Francisco, California)
- Genre: R&B; soul; techno-funk; freestyle
- Length: 45:36
- Label: Epic
- Producer: Teena Marie

Teena Marie chronology
Robbery (1983)	Starchild (1984)	Emerald City (1986)

Starchild is the sixth studio album by American R&B singer Teena Marie, released on November 11, 1984, by Epic Records. This album peaked at No. 9 on the US Billboard Top Black Albums chart and No. 31 on the US Billboard 200. Starchild was also certified Gold in the US by the RIAA.

== Background ==
The album was written and produced by Marie, with contributions from Leon Ware and Narada Michael Walden. The track "My Dear Mr. Gaye" is a tribute to Marvin Gaye, who had been fatally shot and killed by his father on April 1, 1984. Starchild was eventually re-released, with five bonus tracks, in 2012 by SoulMusic Records.

== Critical reception ==
Professional ratings
Review scores
Source	Rating
AllMusic	4/5 stars
Village Voice	B
Spin Alternative Record Guide	8/10
Philadelphia Inquirer	3/5 stars

Ken Tucker of the Philadelphia Inquirer hailed the album saying, "Teena Marie's version of white rhythm and blues has become so extremely stylized that she has become dance-rock's foremost mannerist. On her new album Starchild...Teena Marie wails, gulps and overemotes so dramatically that her exertions take on a great fascination."

== Track listing ==
All songs written by Teena Marie, except where noted.

1. "Lovergirl" – 4:54
2. "Help Youngblood Get to the Freaky Party" (Bendrix, Marie) – 5:44
3. "Out on a Limb" – 6:37
4. "Alibi" (Marie, Fred Mirza) – 5:23
5. "Jammin" – 5:52
6. "Starchild" – 5:35
7. "We've Got to Stop (Meeting Like This)" (duet with Ronnie McNeir) – 5:07
8. "My Dear Mr. Gaye" (Marie, Penny "P.J." Johnson, Leon Ware) – 5:28
9. "Light" – 1:17

Expanded Edition

10. "Lovergirl" (US Single Edit) – 3:59
11. "Lovergirl" (US Special 12" Dance Mix) – 5:53
12. "Lovergirl" (US Single - Instrumental) – 6:10
13. "Jammin'" (Dance Mix - Long Version) – 8:20
14. "Out on a Limb" (US 12" Single Edit) – 5:31

== Personnel ==
Credits for Starchild adapted from Allmusic

- Teena Marie – lead vocals, backing vocals (1, 2, 6), pianos, synthesizers, guitars, drums, drum machine programming, percussion, arrangements, rhythm and vocal arrangements, synthesizer arrangements (1, 2, 4, 5, 6), string arrangements (7)
- Walter Afanasieff – synthesizers
- Wyman Brown – synthesizers
- Darren Carmichael – synthesizers
- Randy Kerber – acoustic piano, synthesizers, rhythm and synthesizer arrangements (6), string arrangements (7)
- Fred Mirza – synthesizers, synthesizer arrangements (1, 4), rhythm arrangements (4)
- Dan Radlauer – synthesizers
- Preston Glass – guitars
- Dann Huff – guitars
- Tom McDermott – guitars
- Corrado Rustici – guitars
- David Taylor – guitars
- David T. Walker – guitars
- Nathan East – bass
- James Jamerson, Jr. – bass
- Allen McGrier –bass, male lead vocals (2), drum machine programming (6)
- James Gadson – drums
- John Robinson – drums
- Narada Michael Walden – drums, rhythm arrangements (3)
- Michael White – drums
- Paulinho da Costa – percussion
- Ernie Watts – saxophone solo (8)
- Gene Page – string conductor (7, 8), string arrangements (8)
- Harry Bluestone – concertmaster (7, 8)
- Billy Griffin – backing vocals
- Mickey Hearn – backing vocals
- Penny "PJ" Johnson – backing vocals, vocal arrangements (8)
- Yvette Marine – backing vocals
- Leon Ware – backing vocals
- Julia Waters Tillman – backing vocals
- Maxine Waters Willard – backing vocals
- Ronnie McNeir – male lead vocals (7)

=== Production ===
- Larkin Arnold – executive producer
- Teena Marie – producer, cover concept
- Bobby Brooks – engineer (1, 2, 4–9), mixing
- David Frazier – engineer (3)
- Rick Butz – assistant engineer
- Elmer Flores – assistant engineer
- Deni King – assistant engineer
- Richard McKernan – assistant engineer
- Magic Moreno – assistant engineer
- Gary Wagner – assistant engineer
- Bernie Grundman – mastering at Bernie Grundman Mastering (Hollywood, California)
- P.J. – production coordinator, cover concept
- Tony Lane – art direction
- Nancy Donald – art direction
- Ron Slenzak – photography
- Tim Wild – airbrushing
- Renny Roberts – back cover illustration
- The Michael Gardner Company – management

== Singles ==
- "Lovergirl" #4 US Pop Singles/ #9 US Black Singles
- "Jammin'" #81 US Pop Singles/ #45 US Black Singles
- "Out on a Limb" #56 US Black Singles
