= Lady Levi =

Jamaican reggae vocalist and hip-hop MC

- Born: Nairobi Williams
- Origin: Jamaica
- Genres: Dancehall; reggae; hip-hop; ragga; new jack swing
- Occupations: Vocalist; toaster; rapper; DJ
- Years active: Late 1980s–2000s
- Labels: Funki Dreds; Motown

Lady Levi (born Nairobi Williams) is a Jamaican-born, California-based dancehall toaster, reggae vocalist, and hip-hop MC. She is noted for her featured vocal appearances on prominent 1990s West Coast hip-hop and G-funk albums, as well as releasing a solo album in 1991 on Motown Records, via Jazzie B of Soul II Soul's Funki Dreds record label.

== Career ==
=== Solo album ===
In the early 1990s, Lady Levi was signed as a solo artist to Funki Dreds, a Motown-distributed record label founded by Soul II Soul frontman Jazzie B. Her only studio album, The Legend of Lady Levi, was released on 23 July 1991. Recorded in London, Kingston, and Los Angeles, the album features production from Jazzie B, Will Mowat, Terry Morris, Tony Dallas, Jeffrey Valantine, and the Jamaican dancehall duo Steely & Clevie.

The album spawned two 12-inch promotional club singles, "Looking for a Dope Beat" and "Rude Boys". While neither the album nor its singles entered major national charts in the United States or the United Kingdom, AllMusic critic Ron Wynn described the album as "one of the more unusual, unpredictable albums of the early '90s", noting its blend of Jamaican patois toasting, American hip-hop cadences, and socially conscious themes on closing tracks such as "Why Do They Fight" and "Not This Generation".

=== Collaborations and session work ===
Following the release of her album, Lady Levi worked as a session vocalist and guest toaster in the Los Angeles hip-hop and R&B scenes. In 1991, she appeared on "Body and Mind" from the Heavy D & the Boyz' album Peaceful Journey. During the mid-1990s, she contributed vocals to several multi-platinum West Coast hip-hop releases, including the extended club remix of Dr. Dre's "Let Me Ride" (1993), Warren G's "So Many Ways" from the 1994 album Regulate... G Funk Era, and 2Pac's "Heavy in the Game" from the 1995 album Me Against the World. She later reunited with Warren G on his 1997 cover of "I Shot the Sheriff" from Take a Look Over Your Shoulder.

Lady Levi also maintained a long-standing musical partnership with R&B singer Teena Marie, contributing vocals across multiple studio albums including Passion Play (1994), La Doña (2004), and Sapphire (2006).

== Musical style ==
Lady Levi's vocal delivery is characterised by switching between traditional Jamaican dancehall toasting and rapid, American-accented hip-hop rapping. Lyrically, her work balances upbeat, club-oriented dancehall riddims with commentary on social awareness, racial equality, and urban crime.

== Discography ==
=== Studio albums ===
Title	Album details
The Legend of Lady Levi	Released: 23 July 1991; Label: Funki Dreds, Motown; Formats: CD, LP, cassette

=== Singles ===
Title	Year	Album
"Looking for a Dope Beat"	1991	The Legend of Lady Levi
"Rude Boys"	1991	The Legend of Lady Levi

=== Guest appearances ===
Title	Year	Other artist(s)	Album
"Body and Mind"	1991	Heavy D & the Boyz	Peaceful Journey
"Let Me Ride" (Extended Club Mix)	1993	Dr. Dre, Snoop Dogg, Ruben Cruz	Non-album single
"So Many Ways"	1994	Warren G, Wayniac, Lady V	Regulate... G Funk Era
"Smooth Tip"	1994	Teena Marie	Passion Play
"Heavy in the Game"	1995	2Pac, Richie Rich	Me Against the World
"I Shot the Sheriff"	1997	Warren G	Take a Look Over Your Shoulder
"Recycle Hate to Love"	2004	Teena Marie	La Doña
"God Has Created"	2006	Teena Marie	Sapphire
