= Grammy Award for Best Female R&B Vocal Performance =

Grammy award conferred between 1968 and 2011

- Awarded for: Quality R&B songs
- Country: United States
- Presented by: National Academy of Recording Arts and Sciences
- First award: 1968
- Final award: 2011
- Website: grammy.com

The Grammy Award for Best Female R&B Vocal Performance (previously called Best Rhythm and Blues Solo Vocal Performance, Female) was an honor presented at the Grammy Awards, a ceremony established in 1958 and originally called the Gramophone Awards, to female recording artists for quality R&B songs. Awards in several categories are distributed annually by the National Academy of Recording Arts and Sciences of the United States to "honor artistic achievement, technical proficiency and overall excellence in the recording industry, without regard to album sales or chart position."

According to the category description guide for the 52nd Grammy Awards, the award was presented to artists that performed "newly recorded solo R&B vocal performances". Solo numbers by members of an established group were not eligible for the award as "separate entries from the duo or group performances." Albums were also considered for the accolade until 1992.

As a part of the major overhaul of Grammy categories, the award was discontinued in 2011. The Female R&B Vocal Performance category, Male R&B Vocal Performance category and all duo/group vocal performances in the R&B category shifted to the Best R&B Performance category in 2012.

The award for the Best Female R&B Vocal Performance was first presented to Aretha Franklin at the 10th Grammy Awards ceremony in 1968 for the song "Respect". Franklin received the most wins with eleven, followed by Anita Baker with five. Franklin also holds the record for the most nominations with twenty-three, while Chaka Khan is second with eight nominations. Fantasia Barrino became the final recipient of the award, when her song "Bittersweet" won the award in 2011. The award was presented to artists from the United States each year.

== Recipients ==
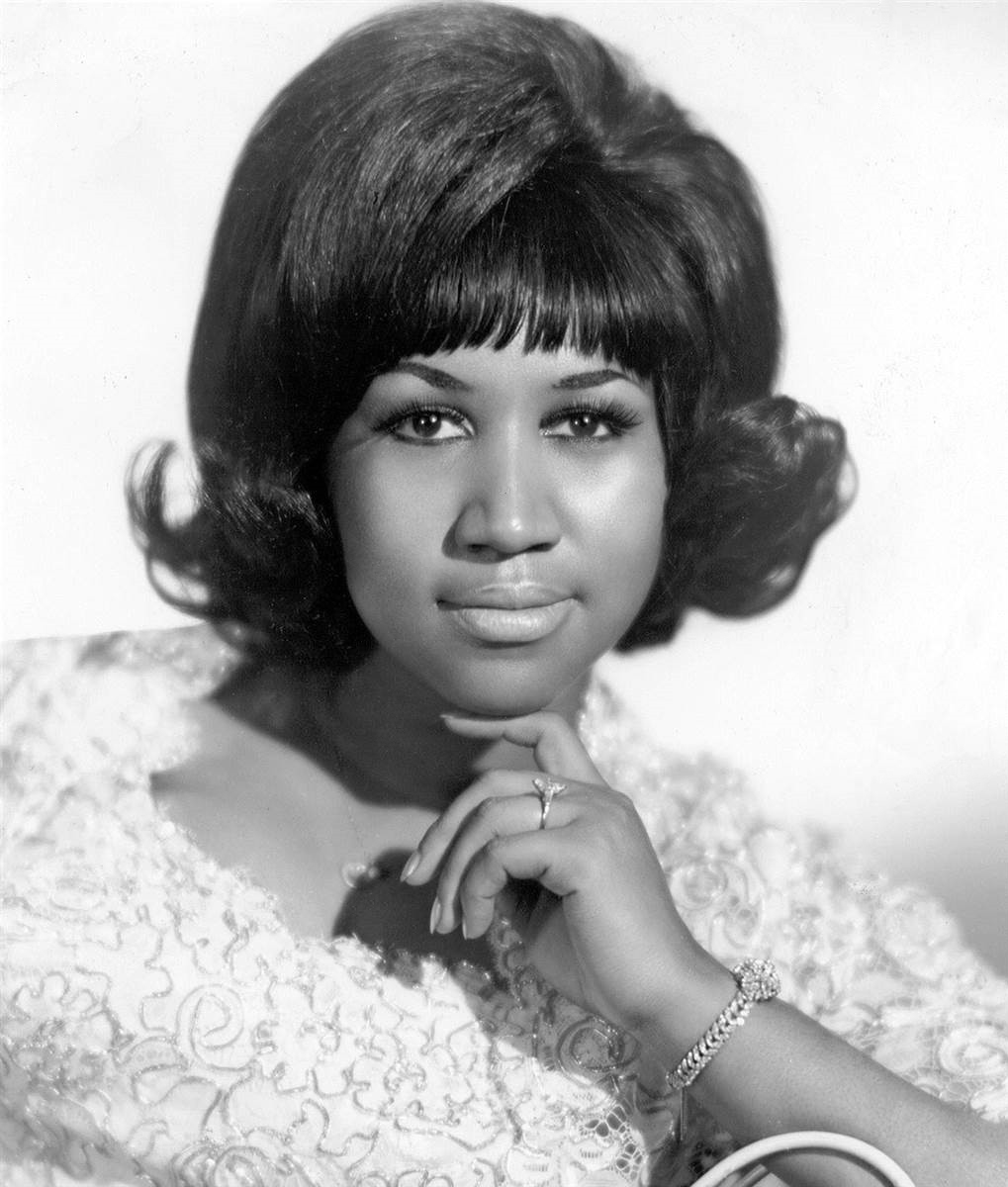
Aretha Franklin was the first recipient of the award in 1968. In total, she won the award eleven times, making her the artist with the most wins in the category.

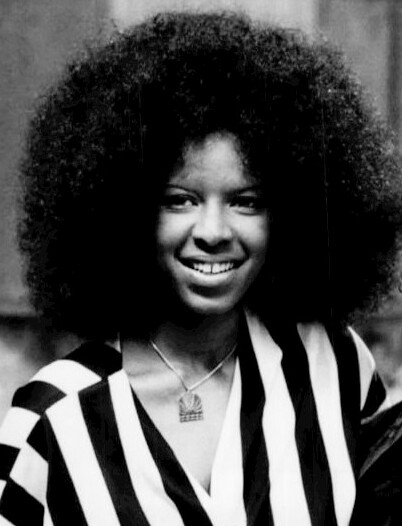
In 1976, Natalie Cole won the award for her song "This Will Be", only the second artist to win the award back then.

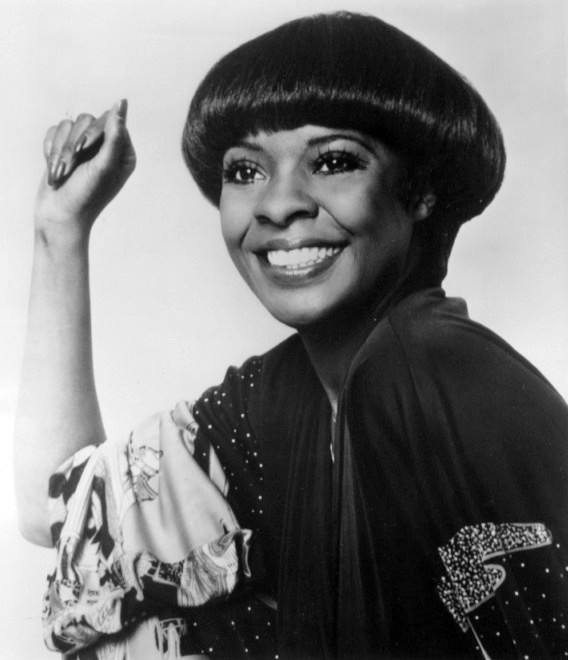
Thelma Houston became the third artist to win the award, in 1978.

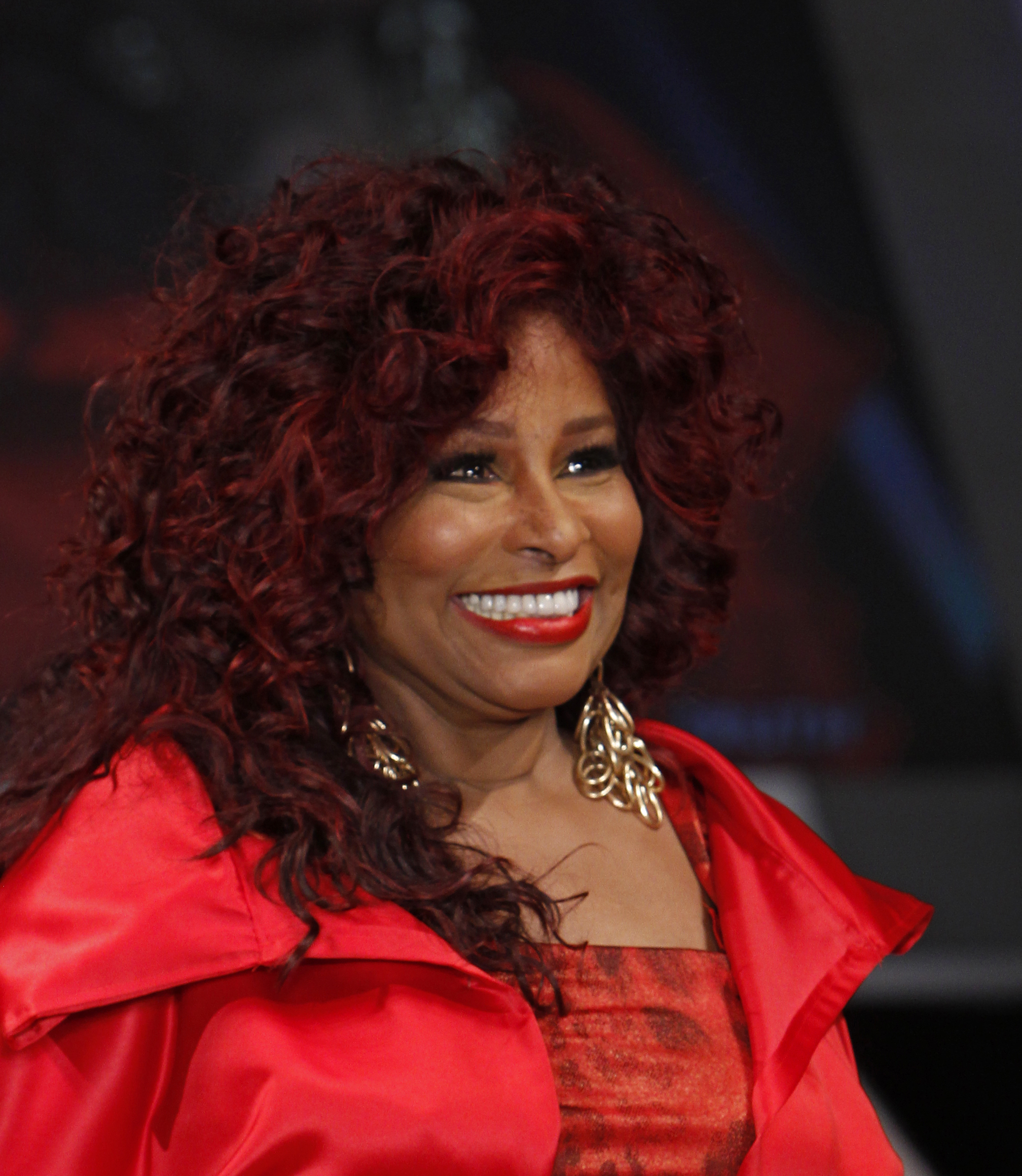
Chaka Khan won the award in 1984 for her album Chaka Khan as well as in 1985 and 1993.

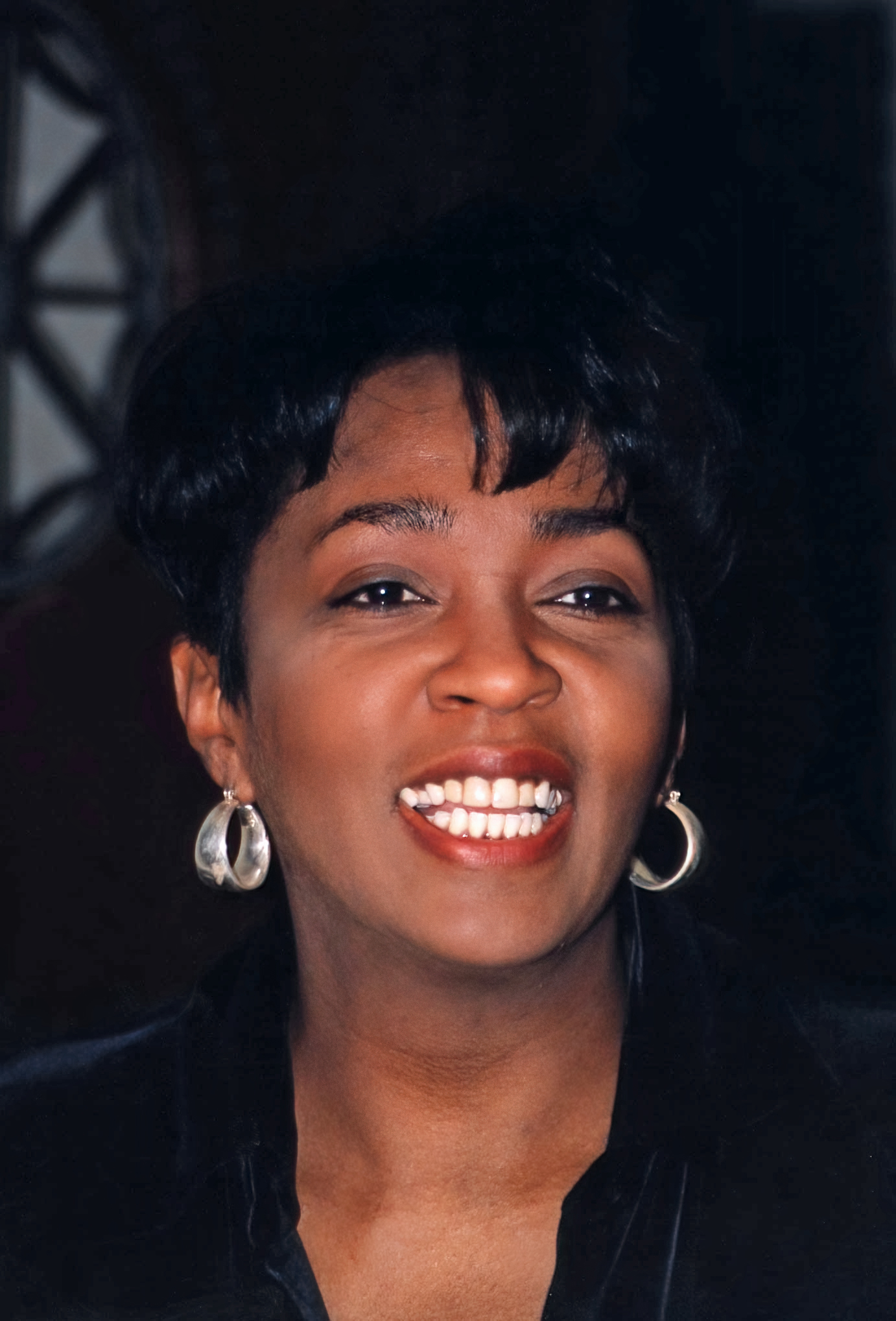
Anita Baker won the award first in 1987. In total, she won the award five times, making her the artist with second most wins.

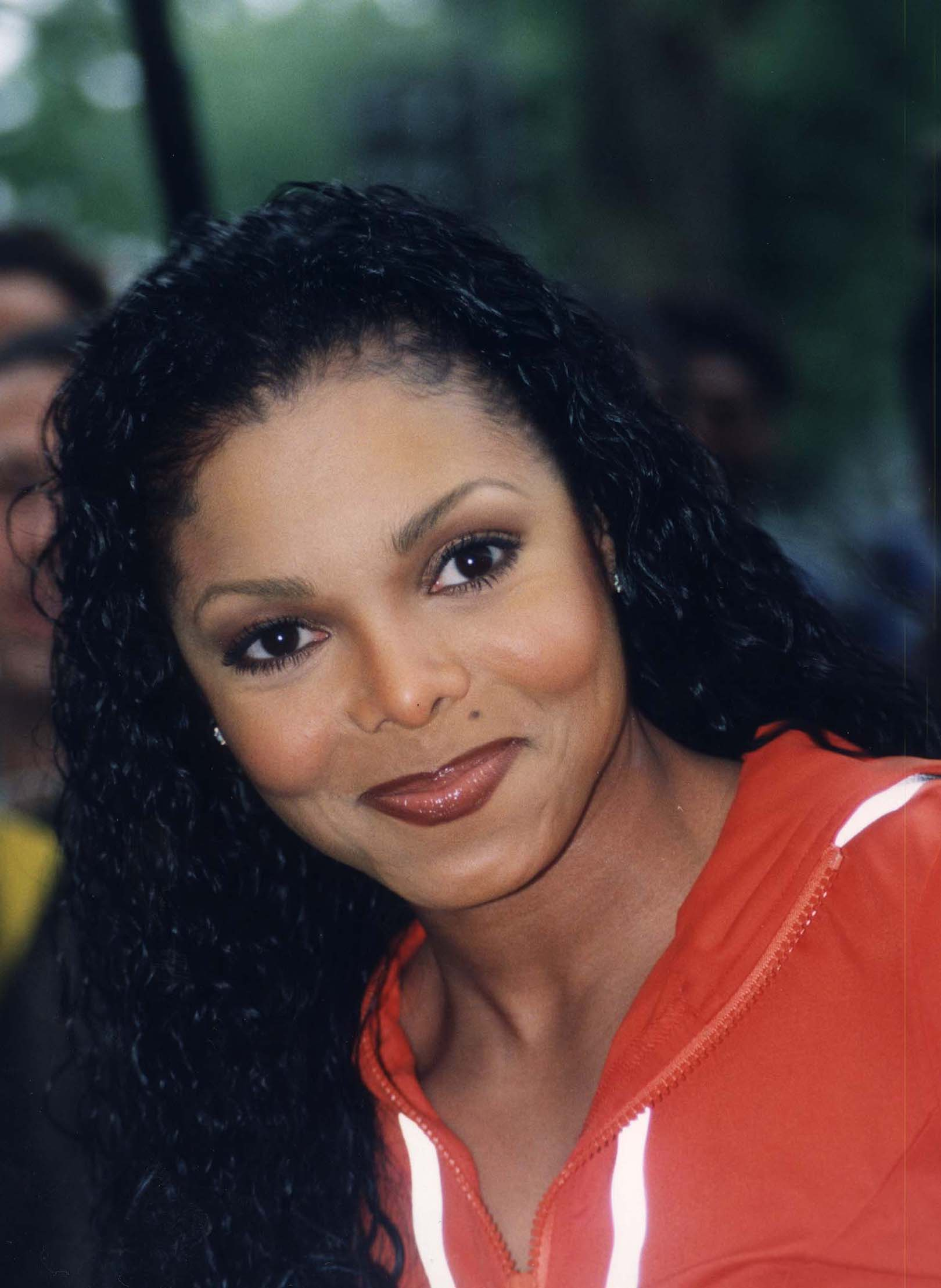
Janet Jackson was nominated six times in the category, but did not win.

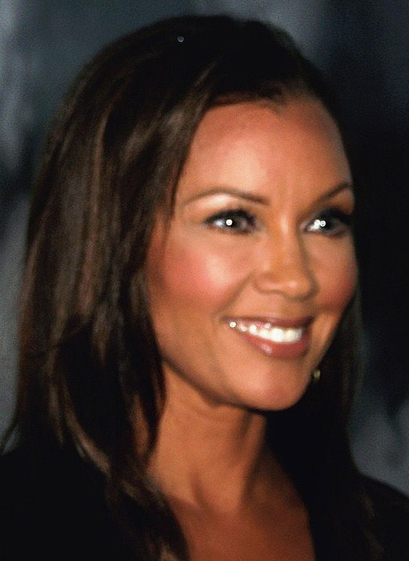
Vanessa L. Williams, five-time nominee in the category

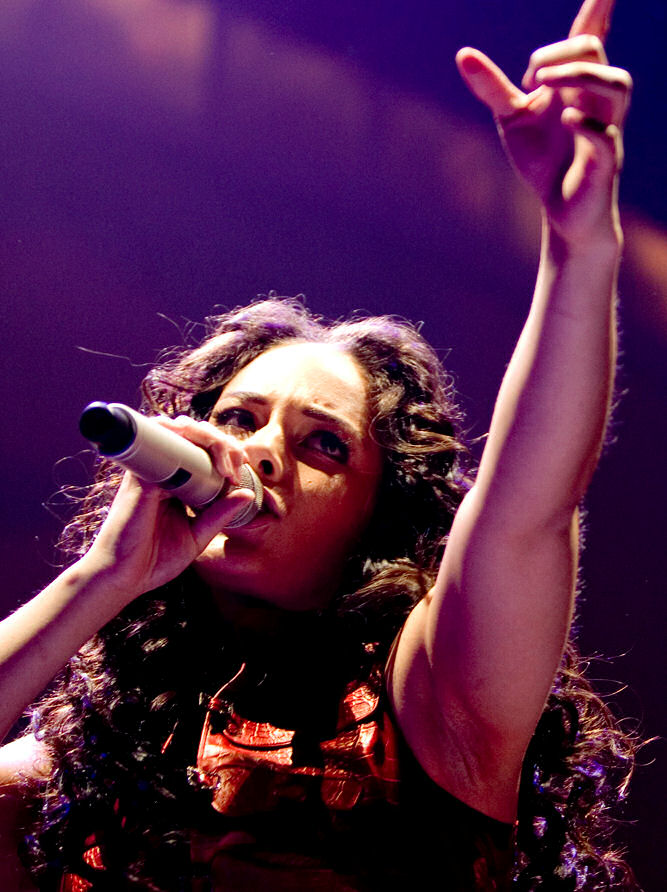
Four-time award winner, Alicia Keys. Keys first won the award in 2002 for her song "Fallin'".

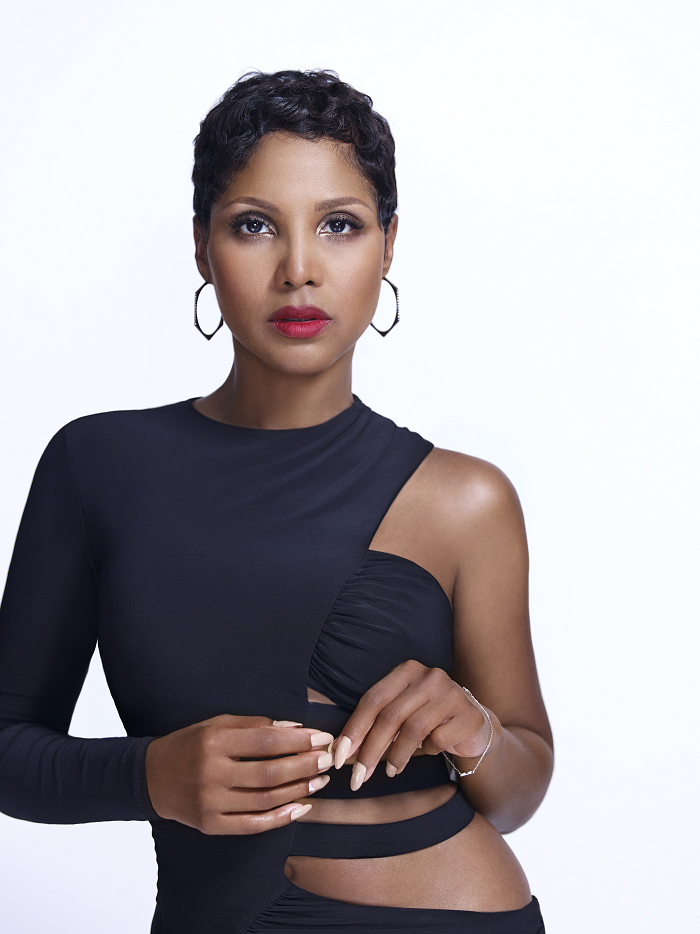
Toni Braxton won the award four times since her debut in 1993.

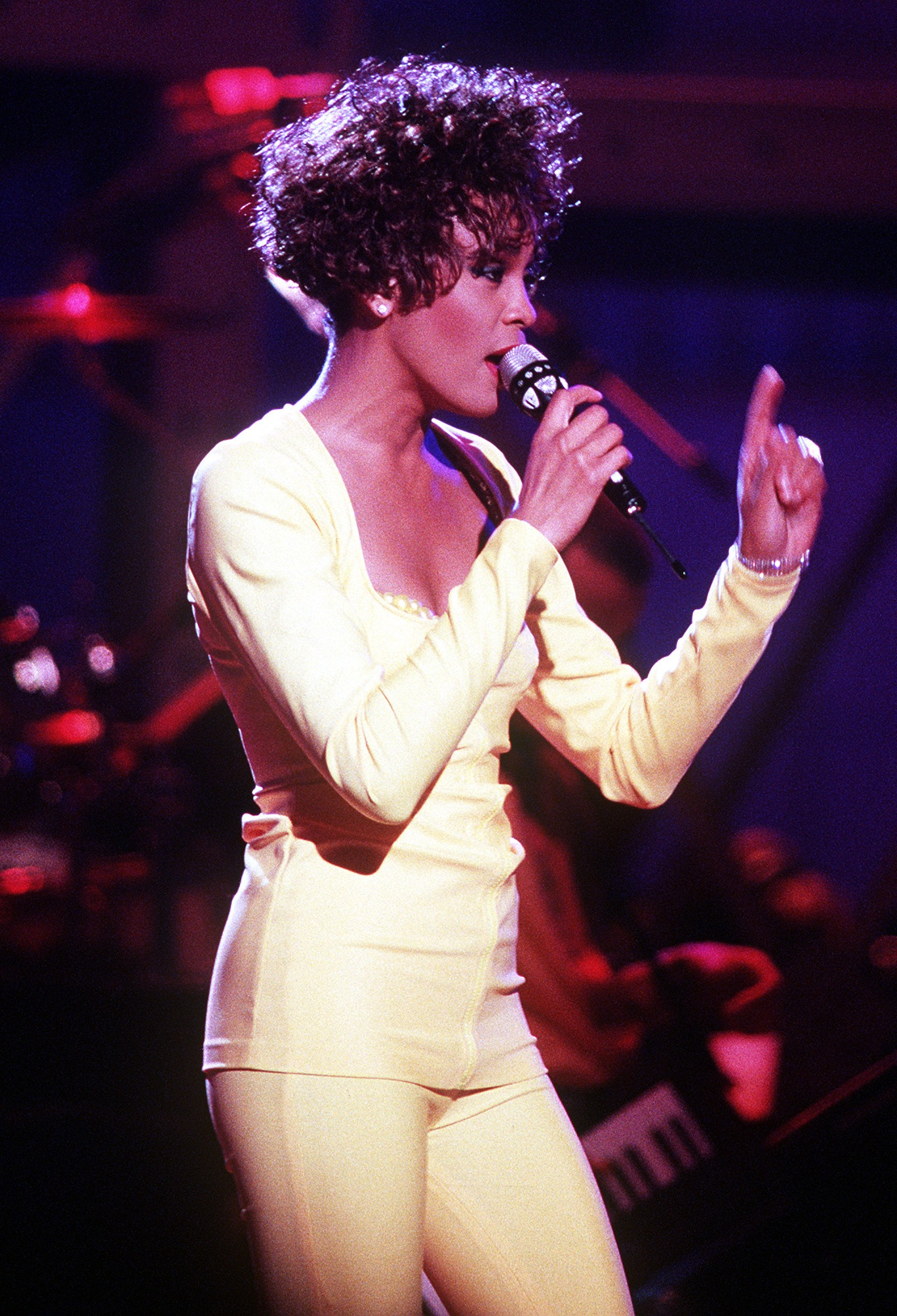
Whitney Houston's song "It's Not Right but It's Okay" won her the award in 2000, making her the first winner of the millennium.

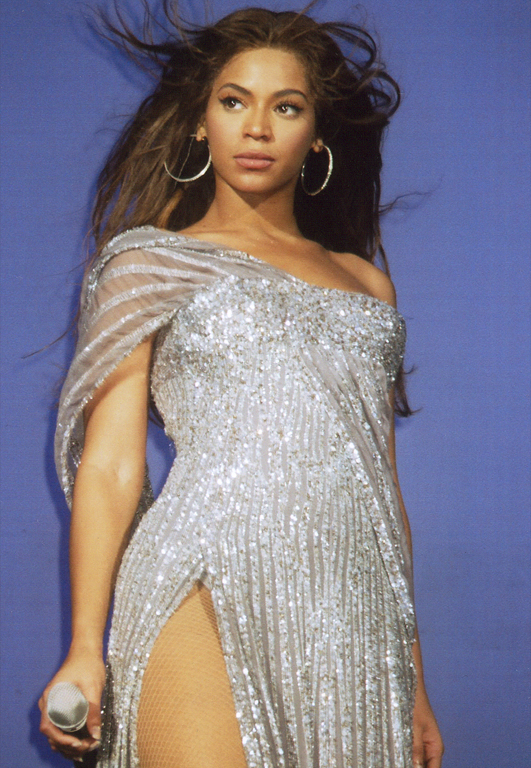
Beyoncé's songs "Dangerously in Love 2" and "Single Ladies (Put a Ring on It)" won her the awards in 2004 and 2010, respectively.

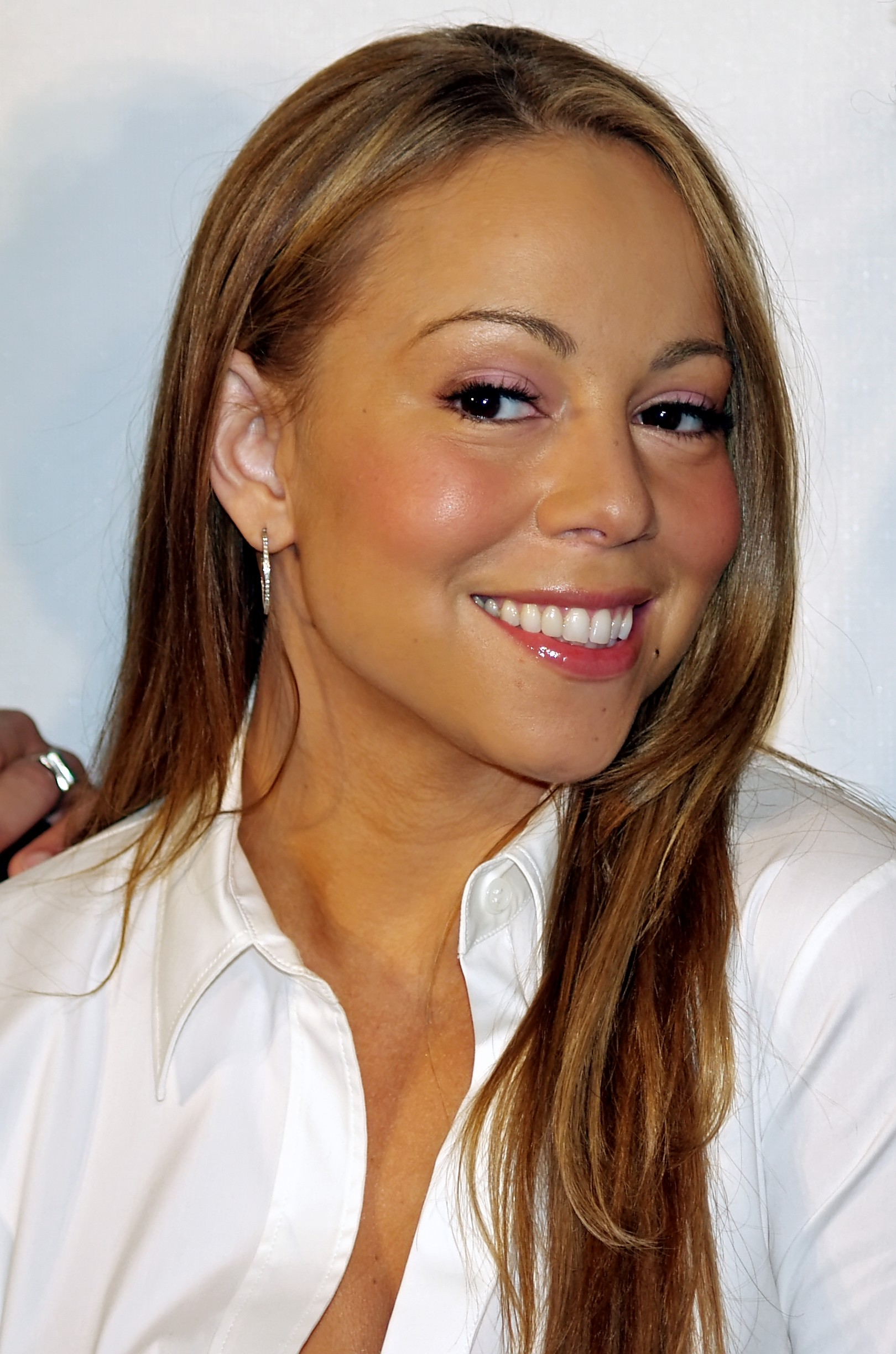
Mariah Carey's chart-topper "We Belong Together" won the award in 2006.

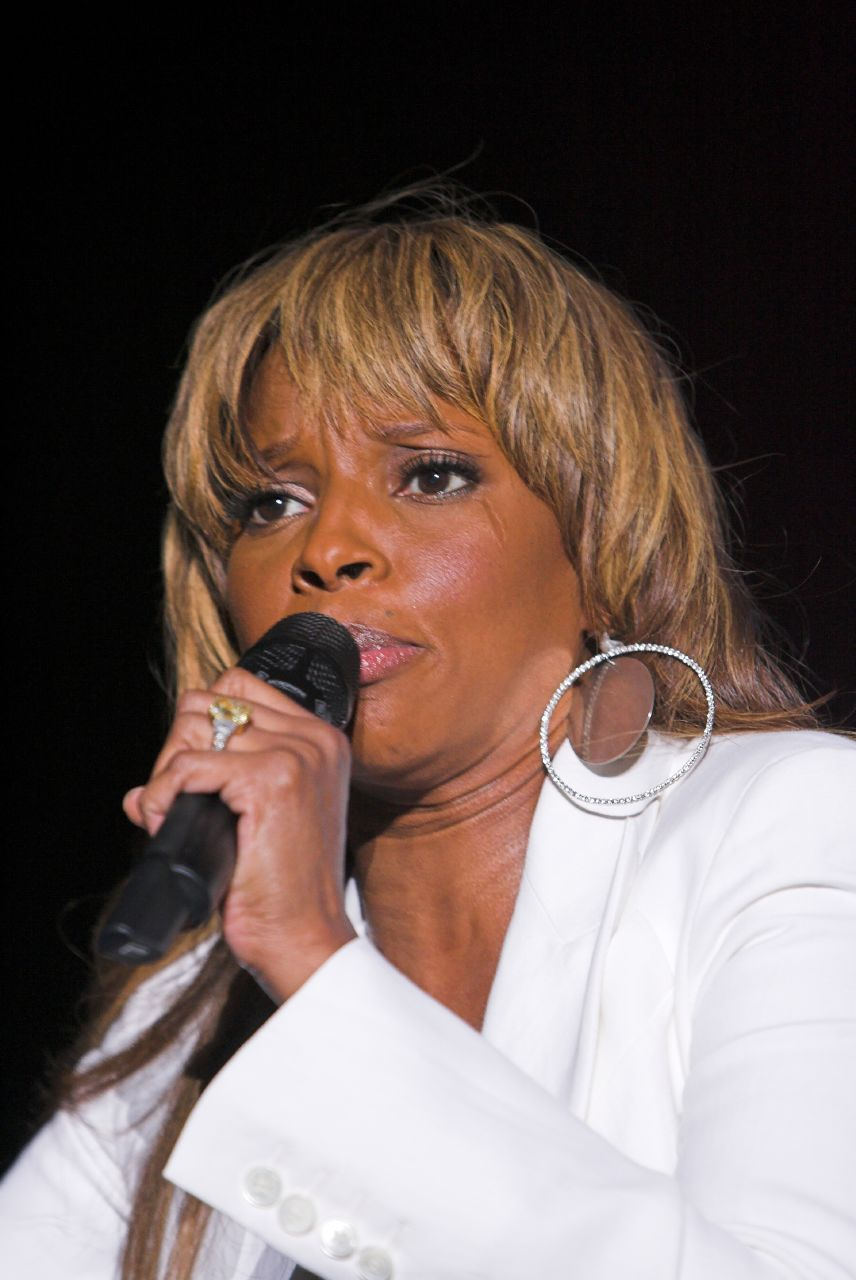
Mary J. Blige won the award twice out of seven nominations.

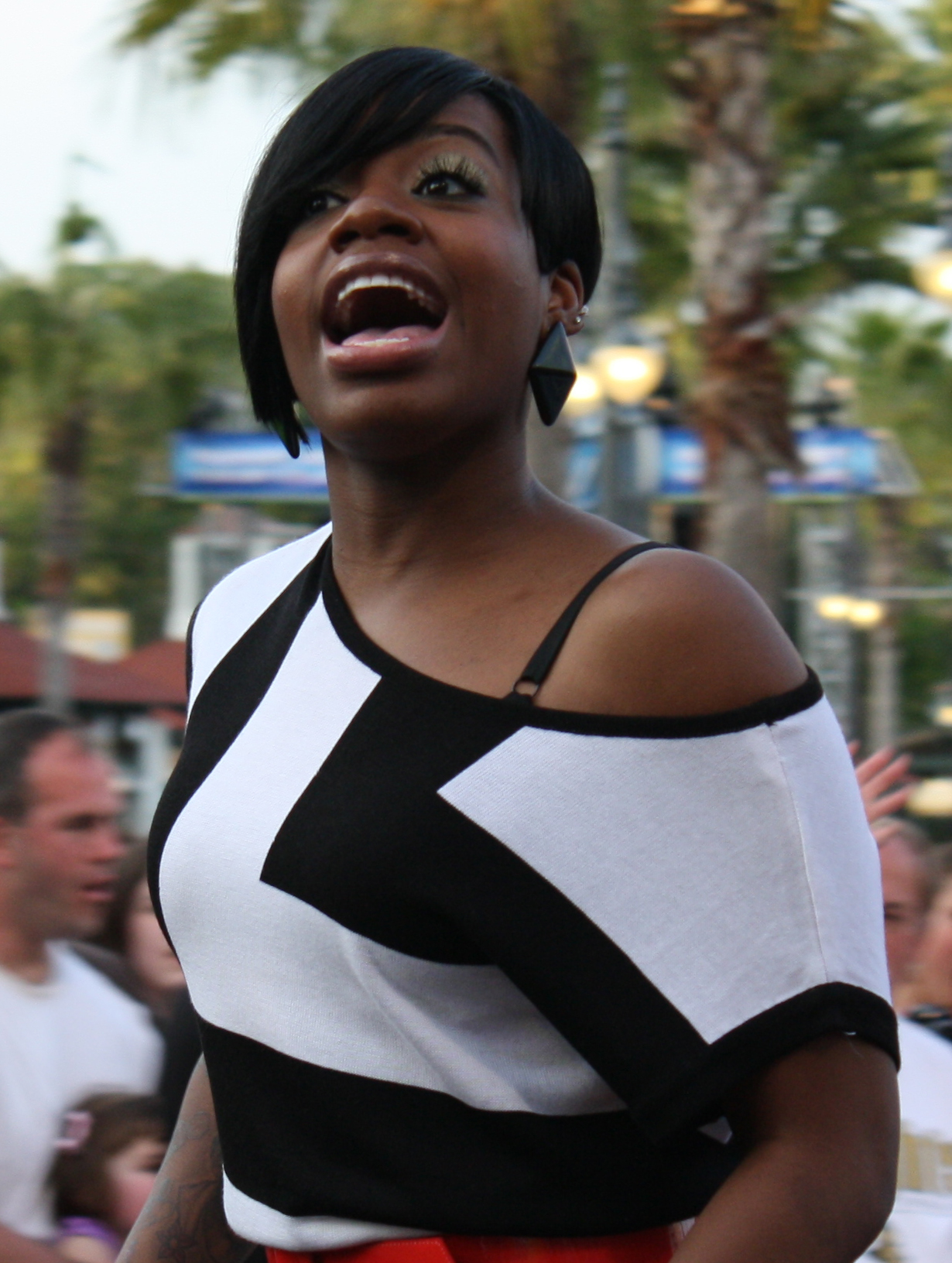
Fantasia Barrino became the last winner in the category, in 2011. She won the award for her song "Bittersweet".

Year^{[I]}	Performing artists	Work	Nominees	Ref.
1968	Aretha Franklin	"Respect"	Etta James – "Tell Mama"; Gladys Knight – "I Heard It Through the Grapevine"; Nina Simone – "You'll Go to Hell"; Carla Thomas – "The Queen Alone"	
1969	Aretha Franklin	"Chain of Fools"	Barbara Acklin – "Love Makes a Woman"; Erma Franklin – "Piece of My Heart"; Etta James – "Security"; Ella Washington – "He Called Me Baby"	
1970	Aretha Franklin	"Share Your Love with Me"	Gloria Taylor – "You Gotta Pay the Price"; Ruth Brown - "Yesterday"; Tina Turner – The Hunter; Dee Dee Warwick – "Foolish Fool"	
1971	Aretha Franklin	"Don't Play That Song"	Esther Phillips – "Set Me Free"; Nina Simone – Black Gold; Candi Staton – "Stand by Your Man"; Dee Dee Warwick – "She Didn't Know"	
1972	Aretha Franklin	"Bridge Over Troubled Water"	Jean Knight – "Mr. Big Stuff"; Janis Joplin – Pearl; Freda Payne – Contact; Diana Ross – "(I Love You) Call Me"	
1973	Aretha Franklin	Young, Gifted And Black	Merry Clayton – "Oh No Not My Baby"; Esther Phillips – From a Whisper to a Scream; Candi Staton – "In the Ghetto"; Betty Wright – "Clean Up Woman"	
1974	Aretha Franklin	"Master of Eyes (The Deepness of Your Eyes)"	Etta James – Etta James; Ann Peebles – "I Can't Stand the Rain"; Esther Phillips – "Alone Again (Naturally)"; Sylvia – "Pillow Talk"	
1975	Aretha Franklin	"Ain't Nothing Like the Real Thing"	Shirley Brown – "Woman to Woman"; Thelma Houston – "You've Been Doing Wrong for So Long"; Millie Jackson – "(If Loving You Is Wrong) I Don't Want to Be Right"; Etta James – "St. Louis Blues"; Ann Peebles – "You Keep Me Hangin' On"; Tina Turner – Tina Turns the Country On!	
1976	Natalie Cole	"This Will Be"	Gloria Gaynor – "Never Can Say Goodbye"; Gwen McCrae – "Rockin' Chair"; Esther Phillips – "What a Diff'rence a Day Makes"; Shirley & Company – "Shame, Shame, Shame"	
1977	Natalie Cole	"Sophisticated Lady (She's a Different Lady)"	Aretha Franklin – "Something He Can Feel"; Dorothy Moore – "Misty Blue"; Melba Moore – "Lean on Me"; Diana Ross – "Love Hangover"	
1978	Thelma Houston	"Don't Leave Me This Way"	Natalie Cole – "I've Got Love on My Mind"; Aretha Franklin – "Break It to Me Gently"; Dorothy Moore – "I Believe You"; Diana Ross – "Your Love Is So Good for Me"	
1979	Donna Summer	"Last Dance"	Alicia Bridges – "I Love the Nightlife"; Natalie Cole – "Our Love"; Aretha Franklin – Almighty Fire; Chaka Khan – "I'm Every Woman"	
1980	Dionne Warwick	"Déjà Vu"	Natalie Cole – I Love You So; Minnie Riperton – Minnie; Amii Stewart – "Knock on Wood"; Donna Summer – "Dim All the Lights"; Anita Ward – "Ring My Bell"	
1981	Stephanie Mills	"Never Knew Love Like This Before"	Roberta Flack – Roberta Flack Featuring Donny Hathaway; Aretha Franklin – "I Can't Turn You Loose"; Minnie Riperton – Love Lives Forever; Diana Ross – "Upside Down"	
1982	Aretha Franklin	"Hold On! I'm Comin'"	Patti Austin – "Razzamatazz"; Chaka Khan – What Cha' Gonna Do for Me; Teena Marie – It Must Be Magic; Stephanie Mills – Stephanie	
1983	Jennifer Holliday	"And I Am Telling You I'm Not Going"	Aretha Franklin – "Jump to It"; Diana Ross – "Muscles"; Patrice Rushen – "Forget Me Nots"; Donna Summer – "Love Is in Control (Finger on the Trigger)"; Deniece Williams – "It's Gonna Take a Miracle"	
1984	Chaka Khan	Chaka Khan	Aretha Franklin – Get It Right; Jennifer Holliday – Feel My Soul; Patti LaBelle – "The Best Is Yet to Come"; Stephanie Mills – Merciless; Deniece Williams – I'm So Proud	
1985	Chaka Khan	"I Feel for You"	Patti Austin – Patti Austin; Shannon – "Let the Music Play"; Tina Turner – "Let's Stay Together"; Deniece Williams – "Let's Hear It for the Boy"	
1986	Aretha Franklin	"Freeway of Love"	Whitney Houston – "You Give Good Love"; Chaka Khan – I Feel for You; Patti LaBelle – "New Attitude"; Teena Marie – "Lovergirl"	
1987	Anita Baker	Rapture	Aretha Franklin – "Jumpin' Jack Flash"; Janet Jackson – Control; Chaka Khan – Destiny; Patti LaBelle – Winner in You	
1988	Aretha Franklin	Aretha	Natalie Cole – Everlasting; Whitney Houston – "For the Love of You"; Jody Watley – "Looking for a New Love"; Nancy Wilson – Forbidden Lover	
1989	Anita Baker	"Giving You the Best That I Got"	Taylor Dayne – "I'll Always Love You"; Pebbles – "Girlfriend"; Karyn White – "The Way You Love Me"; Vanessa Williams – "The Right Stuff"	
1990	Anita Baker	Giving You the Best That I Got	Natalie Cole – Good to Be Back; Aretha Franklin – Through the Storm; Janet Jackson – "Miss You Much"; Vanessa Williams – "Dreamin'"	
1991	Anita Baker	Compositions	Regina Belle – "Make It Like It Was"; Janet Jackson – "Alright"; Patti LaBelle – "I Can't Complain"; Pebbles – "Giving You the Benefit"	
1992	Lisa Fischer; Patti LaBelle	"How Can I Ease the Pain"; Burnin'	Aretha Franklin – What You See Is What You Sweat; Gladys Knight – Good Woman; Vanessa Williams – "Running Back to You"	
1993	Chaka Khan	The Woman I Am	Oleta Adams – "Don't Let the Sun Go Down on Me"; Whitney Houston – "I Belong to You"; Shanice – "I Love Your Smile"; Vanessa Williams – "The Comfort Zone"	
1994	Toni Braxton	"Another Sad Love Song"	*Aretha Franklin – "Someday We'll All Be Free"; Whitney Houston – "I'm Every Woman"; Janet Jackson – "That's The Way Love Goes"; Patti LaBelle – "All Right Now"	
1995	Toni Braxton	"Breathe Again"	Anita Baker – "Body and Soul"; Aretha Franklin – "A Deeper Love"; Gladys Knight – "I Don't Want to Know"; Meshell Ndegeocello – "If That's Your Boyfriend (He Wasn't Last Night)"	
1996	Anita Baker	"I Apologize"	Brandy – "Baby"; Toni Braxton – "I Belong To You"; Mariah Carey – "Always Be My Baby"; Vanessa Williams – "The Way That You Love"	
1997	Toni Braxton	"You're Makin' Me High"	Brandy – "Sittin' Up in My Room"; Mary J. Blige – "Not Gon' Cry"; Tamia – "You Put a Move on My Heart"; Whitney Houston – "Exhale (Shoop Shoop)"	
1998	Erykah Badu	"On & On"	Chaka Khan – "Summertime"; Mariah Carey – "Honey"; Patti LaBelle – "When You Talk About Love"; Whitney Houston – "I Believe in You and Me"	
1999	Lauryn Hill	"Doo Wop (That Thing)"	Aaliyah – "Are You That Somebody?"; Aretha Franklin – "A Rose Is Still a Rose"; Erykah Badu – "Tyrone"; Janet Jackson – "I Get Lonely"	
2000	Whitney Houston	"It's Not Right but It's Okay"	Brandy – "Almost Doesn't Count"; Mary J. Blige – "All That I Can Say"; Faith Evans – "Love Like This"; Macy Gray – "Do Something"	
2001	Toni Braxton	"He Wasn't Man Enough"	Aaliyah – "Try Again"; Erykah Badu – "Bag Lady"; Kelly Price – "As We Lay"; Jill Scott – "Gettin' in the Way"	
2002	Alicia Keys	"Fallin'"	Aaliyah – "Rock the Boat"; India.Arie – "Video"; Mary J. Blige – "Family Affair"; Blu Cantrell – "Hit 'em Up Style (Oops!)"; Jill Scott – "A Long Walk"	
2003	Mary J. Blige	"He Think I Don't Know"	Aaliyah – "More Than a Woman"; Ashanti – "Foolish"; Eartha – "I'm Still Standing"; Jill Scott – "He Loves Me (Lyzel in E Flat)"	
2004	Beyoncé Knowles	"Dangerously in Love 2"	Ashanti – "Rain on Me"; Erykah Badu – "Back in the Day"; Mary J. Blige – "Ooh!"; Heather Headley – "I Wish I Wasn't"	
2005	Alicia Keys	"If I Ain't Got You"	Janet Jackson – "I Want You"; Teena Marie – "I'm Still in Love"; Jill Scott – "Whatever"; Angie Stone – "U-Haul"	
2006	Mariah Carey	"We Belong Together"	Amerie – "1 Thing"; Fantasia – "Free Yourself"; Alicia Keys – "Unbreakable"; Beyoncé – "Wishing on a Star"	
2007	Mary J. Blige	"Be Without You"	India.Arie – "I Am Not My Hair"; Natalie Cole – "Day Dreaming"; Beyoncé – "Ring the Alarm"; Mariah Carey – "Don't Forget About Us"	
2008	Alicia Keys	"No One"	Mary J. Blige – "Just Fine"; Fantasia – "When I See U"; Chrisette Michele – "If I Have My Way"; Jill Scott – "Hate On Me"	
2009	Alicia Keys	"Superwoman"	Beyoncé – "Me, Myself and I (Live)"; Keyshia Cole – "Heaven Sent"; Jennifer Hudson – "Spotlight"; Jazmine Sullivan – "Need U Bad"	
2010	Beyoncé Knowles	"Single Ladies (Put a Ring on It)"	Melanie Fiona – "It Kills Me"; Lalah Hathaway – "That Was Then"; Ledisi – "Goin' Thru Changes"; Jazmine Sullivan – "Lions, Tigers & Bears"	
2011	Fantasia Barrino	"Bittersweet"	Faith Evans – "Gone Already"; Monica – "Everything to Me"; Kelly Price – "Tired"; Jazmine Sullivan – "Holding You Down (Goin' in Circles)"	

^{^[I]} Each year is linked to the article about the Grammy Awards held that year.

== See also ==
- List of artists who reached number one on the Billboard R&B chart
- List of Grammy Award categories
- List of number-one rhythm and blues hits (United States)
