= Ivory (Teena Marie album) =

Studio album by Teena Marie
- Released: July 17, 1990
- Recorded: 1990
- Genre: R&B; soul; dance pop
- Length: 69:42
- Label: Epic
- Producer: Teena Marie

Teena Marie chronology
Naked to the World (1988)	Ivory (1990)	Passion Play (1994)

Singles from Ivory
- 1. "Here's Looking At You" Released: July 13, 1990; 2. "If I Were A Bell" Released: October 16, 1990; 3. "Just Us Two" Released: January 19, 1991; 4. "Since Day One" Released: April 8, 1991 (UK)

Ivory is the ninth album by the American singer-songwriter Teena Marie, released on July 17, 1990. It was her last album for Epic Records. Marie supported the album with a North American tour.

The album reached No. 27 on the US Black Albums chart and No. 132 on the Billboard 200 (her lowest-placing album on both charts up to that date). Two singles from the album, "If I Were a Bell" and "Here's Looking at You", performed respectably on the Black Singles chart, peaking at No. 8 and No. 11 respectively. "Since Day One" reached No. 69 in the UK, Marie's highest charting single in that country since "I Need Your Lovin'" ten years previously.

== Production ==
The album was produced primarily by Marie; she considered it to have a rawer sound than previous albums. "Since Day One" was produced by Jazzie B of Soul II Soul. Marie and Michael Bivins rapped on "Here's Looking at You".

== Critical reception ==
Professional ratings
Review scores
Source	Rating
AllMusic	3/5 stars
Chicago Tribune	3/4 stars
The Rolling Stone Album Guide	4/5 stars
Spin Alternative Record Guide	7/10

The Los Angeles Times noted that "longtime fans should find the title cut inviting—it resembles one of those I-am-womanhood-personified poems that Nikki Giovanni used to write back in the early '70s." The Chicago Tribune wrote that "the ballads ... are crushed beneath the weight of Marie's tedious new age philosophizing." The Los Angeles Daily News deemed Ivory "another singular collection of soul ballads and rhythmic dance numbers."

== Track listing ==
All tracks are written by Teena Marie, except where noted.

No.	Title	Writer(s)	Length
1.	"Here's Looking at You"	Teena Marie	6:15
2.	"The Sugar Shack Prelude"	Marie, Penny "P.J." Johnson	1:06
3.	"The Sugar Shack"	Marie, James Stewart	5:48
4.	"If I Were a Bell"	Marie	6:41
5.	"Just Us Two"	Marie, James Reese	6:08
6.	"Mr. Icecream"	Marie	6:06
7.	"Ivory (A Tone Poem)"	Marie	1:21
8.	"Snap Your Fingers"	Marie, James Allen	5:07
9.	"Cupid Is a Real Straight Shooter"	Marie	5:46
10.	"How Can You Resist It"	Marie, Johnson	5:29
11.	"Since Day One"	Jazzie B, Marie, Michael J McEvoy	6:44
12.	"Miracles Need Wings to Fly"	Marie	5:12
13.	"The Red Zone"	Marie	7:59
Total length:			69:42

== Charts ==
=== Weekly charts ===
Chart (1990)	Peak position
US Billboard 200	132
US Top R&B/Hip-Hop Albums (Billboard)	27

=== Year-end charts ===
Chart (1991)	Position
US Top R&B/Hip-Hop Albums (Billboard)	84
