= Robbery (album) =

Studio album by Teena Marie
- Released: September 18, 1983
- Recorded: 1982–83
- Studio: Ocean Way Recording (Hollywood, California); Larrabee Sound Studios (North Hollywood, California); Record One (Sherman Oaks, California); The Complex and California Wanderland Studios (Los Angeles, California)
- Genre: R&B; funk; soul; post-disco
- Length: 49:18 (Original release) *69:18 (Expanded edition)
- Label: Epic
- Producer: Teena Marie

Teena Marie chronology
It Must Be Magic (1981)	Robbery (1983)	Starchild (1984)

Robbery is the fifth studio album by American singer-songwriter Teena Marie, released on September 18, 1983. It is her first album for Epic Records, following her acrimonious departure from Motown the previous year. The album was written and produced by Marie herself and features contributions from Patrice Rushen, Paulinho da Costa, and Steve Ferrone among others. However, the album did not repeat the success of her last Motown release It Must Be Magic (1981) stalling at number 13 on the Black Albums chart and only reaching number 119 on the Billboard Albums chart.

The album placed three singles on the US Black Singles chart" "Fix It", peaking at #21, followed by "Midnight Magnet" (#31) and "Dear Lover" (#77).

In 2012, the album was re-released in a remastered and expanded CD edition containing four additional tracks.

== Cassanova Brown ==
Included on this album is the infamous song, "Cassanova Brown". After meeting Rick James in the '70s and being signed to the same label, James and Marie began a relationship, first professional, progressing (according to Marie) to a romantic one, and finally leading to an engagement. Although James himself denied ever having a romantic involvement with Marie, she said they were engaged for a few weeks. When James' alleged infidelities came to light, Marie realized that she herself was a mistress; James had a girlfriend, Alfie Davidson, who would later substantiate that James and Marie were once an item, while she was his girlfriend. After the breakup, their relationship waned to a tumultuous friendship. The lyrics are very thinly veiled in her contempt for the situation.

Professional ratings
Review scores
Source	Rating
AllMusic	link
Spin Alternative Record Guide	7/10

== Track listing ==
All songs written by Teena Marie.

1. "Robbery" - 5:23
2. "Playboy" - 5:23
3. "Shadow Boxing" - 6:49
4. "Midnight Magnet" - 6:02
5. "Fix It" - 4:44
6. "Ask Your Momma" - 5:25
7. "Dear Lover" - 5:18
8. "Stop the World" - 4:16
9. "Cassanova Brown" - 5:58

Bonus tracks - 2012 SoulMusic reissue

1. "Playboy" (US 12" Remix) - 5:51 (Expanded edition)
2. "Fix It" (US 12" Remix) - 6:30 (Expanded edition)
3. "Fix It" (Instrumental)(US 12" Remix) - 8:16 (Expanded edition)
4. "Midnight Magnet" (US 12" Instrumental) - 6:00 (Expanded edition)

== Personnel ==
Credits for Robbery adapted from Allmusic

- Teena Marie – lead vocals, backing vocals (1, 3, 4, 6, 7, 8), rhythm arrangements, synthesizer arrangements (1, 2, 4, 5, 6), vocal arrangements, horn arrangements (2, 3, 9), synthesizers (5, 6), string arrangements (5, 6), monologue (6)
- Todd Cochran – synthesizers (1, 2, 4, 5)
- Eric O'Neal – synthesizers (1, 5), synthesizer arrangements (5)
- John Bokowski Jr. – Rhodes piano (2, 4, 6, 8), synthesizers (4), acoustic piano (7, 9)
- Dwayne Wedlaw – synthesizer arrangements (4)
- Patrice Rushen – synthesizers (6)
- Keith Alexander – guitars (1, 4, 5)
- Paul Jackson Jr. – guitars (2, 6, 8), guitar solo (3)
- Greg Poree – acoustic guitar (3)
- Marlo Henderson – guitars (4)
- Charles Fearing – guitars (5)
- Nick Brown – guitars (9)
- Nathan East – bass (1, 4)
- Anthony Jackson – bass (2, 6, 7)
- Abraham Laboriel – bass (3)
- Nathan Watts – bass (8), rhythm arrangements (8)
- Stanley Clarke – upright bass (9)
- John Robinson – Simmons drums (1, 4), drums (8)
- Steve Ferrone – drums (2, 7)
- Paul Hines – drums (3)
- Ricky Lawson – drums (6)
- Nick Ceroli – drums (9)
- Paulinho da Costa – percussion (1, 3, 4, 6, 8)
- Vincent Charles – steel drums (8)
- Ernie Watts – alto saxophone (2, 3, 9)
- Gary Herbig – tenor saxophone (2, 3, 9)
- Daniel LeMelle – saxophone solo (3, 8)
- Dick Hyde – trombone (2, 3, 9)
- Charles Loper – trombone (2, 3, 9)
- Chuck Findley – trumpet (2, 3, 9)
- Gary Grant – trumpet (2, 3, 9)
- Paul Riser – string arrangements (5, 7, 8, 9), string conductor (5–9), horn arrangements (9)
- Fred Mirza – string arrangements (6)
- Harry Bluestone – concertmaster (5–9)
- Anthony Allan Brockert – monologue (1)
- Alicia Gladden – monologue (1)
- James Allen – backing vocals (2, 5), drums (5)
- Recco Philmore – backing vocals (2, 5)
- Darryl Phinnessee – backing vocals (2, 5)
- Carmen Twillie – backing vocals (2, 4, 5, 7, 8)
- Julia Tillman Waters – backing vocals (2, 4, 5, 7, 8)
- Maxine Willard Waters – backing vocals (2, 4, 5, 7, 8)
- Car Johnson – additional backing vocals (2)
- Penny "PJ" Johnson – monologue (5)
- Mickey Hearn – monologue (6)

=== Production ===
- Teena Marie – producer
- Bobby Brooks – recording, mixing
- Niko Bolas – assistant engineer
- Sabrina Buchanek – assistant engineer
- David Egerton – assistant engineer
- Carwell Johnson – assistant engineer
- Barbara Rooney – assistant engineer
- Stephen Marcussen – mastering at Precision Lacquer (Hollywood, California)
- Penny "PJ" Johnson – production coordinator
- Tony Lane – art direction
- Nancy Donald – art direction
- Ron Slenzak – photography

Reissue credits

- Leo Sacks – reissue producer
- Steven Berkowitz – A&R
- Stacey Boyle – A&R, artist coordination
- Jeremy Holiday – A&R, artist coordination
- Patti Matheny – A&R, artist coordination
- Darren Salmieri – A&R, artist coordination
- Joseph M. Palmaccio – mastering
- Brian Chin – liner notes
- Howard Fritzson – art direction
- Jo Hay – design
- Lynn Goldsmith – photography
- Joy Gilbert Monfried – project director
- Dianne Spoto – packaging manager
