= Lovergirl =

1984 Teena Marie song

Single by Teena Marie

from the album Starchild
- Released: October 1984
- Recorded: 1984
- Genre: Funk; dance-pop; R&B
- Length: 4:52 (album version); 4:21 (single version)
- Label: Epic
- Songwriter: Teena Marie
- Producer: Teena Marie

Teena Marie singles chronology
"Dear Lover" (1984)	"Lovergirl" (1984)	"Jammin" (1985)

Music video
- Lovergirl on YouTube

"Lovergirl" is a song by American singer Teena Marie from her sixth studio album, Starchild (1984). Written, composed and produced by Marie, the song was released as the lead single from Starchild in October 1984. It was Marie's first hit single under her new label, Epic, after a lawsuit with Motown. "Lovergirl" also became Marie's biggest hit, peaking at number four on the US Billboard Hot 100.

== Awards and accolades ==
Marie received a Grammy Award nomination for Best Female R&B Vocal Performance for "Lovergirl" at the 28th Annual Grammy Awards–her second nomination in that category. The award was won by Aretha Franklin's "Freeway of Love".

== Music video ==
The accompanying music video for "Lovergirl" was directed by actress Cicely Tyson.

== Charts ==
=== Weekly charts ===
Chart (1984–1985)	Peak position
Australia (Kent Music Report)	19
UK Singles (OCC)	76
US Billboard Hot 100	4
US Hot Black Singles (Billboard)	9
US Hot Dance/Disco Club Play (Billboard)	6

=== Year-end charts ===
Chart (1985)	Rank
US Billboard Hot 100	29
