= Emerald City (Teena Marie album) =

1986 studio album by Teena Marie

Studio album by Teena Marie
- Released: July 22, 1986
- Recorded: 1985–1986
- Genre: Rock; R&B; funk
- Length: 43:03
- Label: Epic/CBS Records; FE 40318
- Producer: Teena Marie

Teena Marie chronology
Starchild (1984)	Emerald City (1986)	Naked to the World (1988)

Emerald City is the seventh album by Teena Marie, released on July 22, 1986. It is a stylistic departure for her, with strong blues and rock influences favored over her established soul/funk style, and is a concept album. This proved puzzling for fans and critics, and the album sold poorly, peaking at number 20 on the US Black Albums chart and number 81 on the Billboard Albums chart.

Two singles, "Lips to Find You" and "Love Me Down Easy", were released. They reached #28 and #76 respectively on the Black Singles chart, but neither charted on the Billboard Hot 100. However, "Shangri-La", while it never became a single or charted anywhere, became a staple of Quiet storm programming blocks on adult R&B radio.

Stevie Ray Vaughan composed and performed the guitar solo on "You So Heavy", Bootsy Collins provided vocals on the title album track, and Stanley Clarke played bass on "Sunny Skies".

In his 1991 book Stairway to Hell: The 500 Best Heavy Metal Albums in the Universe, rock critic Chuck Eddy put Emerald City in the ninth spot; it is the lone entry in the book that does not fit traditional categories of heavy metal.

The album was reissued by SoulMusic Records in 2012, with five bonus tracks.

Professional ratings
Review scores
Source	Rating
AllMusic	2/5 stars
Spin Alternative Record Guide	8/10

== Track listing ==
All songs written by Teena Marie, except where noted.

1. "Emerald City" - 4:10
2. "Once Is Not Enough" - 5:47
3. "Lips to Find You" (Bendrix, Marie) - 5:11
4. "You So Heavy" (Marie, Penny "P.J." Johnson) - 5:07
5. "Shangri-La" (Marie, Johnson) - 5:04
6. "Batucada Suite" - 5:06
7. "Love Me Down Easy" - 5:24
8. "Sunny Skies" - 7:14

Bonus tracks - 2012 SoulMusic reissue

1. "Lips To Find You" (US instrumental) - Expanded Edition
2. "Love Me Down Easy" (US 12-inch single) - Expanded Edition
3. "Love Me Down Easy" (US instrumental 12-inch single) - Expanded Edition
4. "14K" (track from "The Goonies" soundtrack) - Expanded Edition
5. "Lead Me On" (from the "Top Gun" soundtrack) - Expanded Edition
