= Beautiful (Teena Marie album) =

Studio album by Teena Marie
- Released: January 15, 2013
- Genre: R&B; soul
- Length: 63:18
- Label: Universal
- Producer: Teena Marie; Doug Grigsby; Stan Davis

Teena Marie chronology
| Congo Square (2009) | Beautiful (2013) |

Professional ratings
Aggregate scores
| Source | Rating |
|---|---|
| Metacritic | 69/100 |
Review scores
| Source | Rating |
| Allmusic | 4/5 stars |

Beautiful is the fourteenth and final studio album by American musician Teena Marie. It was posthumously released in January 2013 under Universal Music. The album was recorded shortly before the singer's death in December 2010 and temporarily shelved. It was eventually completed over the next two years by Marie's daughter, Alia Rose.

== Track listing ==
| No. | Title | Writer(s) | Length |
|---|---|---|---|
| 1. | "Luv Letter" | Teena Marie | 4:37 |
| 2. | "Sweet Tooth" | Zipporah Garnett, Teena Marie, Alia Rose | 5:36 |
| 3. | "Rare Breed" | Doug Grigsby, Teena Marie, Alia Rose | 4:37 |
| 4. | "Love Starved" | Teena Marie | 4:44 |
| 5. | "Definition of Down" | Doug Grigsby, Teena Marie, Darlene M. Ortiz | 4:49 |
| 6. | "Maria Bonita (For My Mother)" | James Allen, Lee Cadena, Teena Marie | 5:15 |
| 7. | "Beautiful (For Alia)" | Doug Grigsby, Teena Marie, Alia Rose | 5:44 |
| 8. | "The Long Play" | Greg Dalton, Doug Grigsby, Donnell Spencer Jr., Teena Marie | 6:30 |
| 9. | "Carte Blanche" | Doug Grigsby, Teena Marie, Daphne Wayans | 5:18 |
| 10. | "Give Me Your Love" | Curtis Mayfield | 4:56 |
| 11. | "Wild Horses" | Doug Grigsby, Teena Marie | 5:17 |
| 12. | "The Perfect Feeling" | Teena Marie | 5:48 |
| 13. | "Ooo Baby Baby" | Smokey Robinson, Pete Moore | 4:43 |
