= Sapphire (Teena Marie album) =

Studio album by Teena Marie
- Released: May 9, 2006
- Recorded: 2006
- Genres: R&B; soul; hip hop
- Length: 74:45
- Labels: Cash Money; Universal
- Producers: Ronald Williams; Bryan Williams; Teena Marie

Teena Marie chronology
La Doña (2004)	Sapphire (2006)	Congo Square (2009)

Sapphire is the twelfth album by Teena Marie. It was released on May 9, 2006 by Cash Money and Universal Records. It includes guest contributions from Smokey Robinson, George Duke, Gerald Albright, rapper Kurupt, and Marie's daughter, Alia Rose.

The album's lead single "Ooh Wee" featuring rapper Kurupt peaked at #32 on the US Hot R&B Singles chart. The track "You Blow Me Away" pays tribute to Rick James, while "Resilient (Sapphire)" remembers the victims and survivors of Hurricane Katrina.

Sapphire peaked at #3 on the US R&B Albums chart and #24 on the Billboard 200.

== Critical reception ==
Professional ratings
Review scores
Source	Rating
Allmusic	4/5 stars
Dayton Daily News	(B)
St Louis Post Dispatch	(B−)
USA Today	3.5/4 stars
Dallas Morning News	(B−)

Otis Gowens of the Dayton Daily News in a B review remarked, "Teena Marie is living proof that you are only as old as you feel. At 50, she sounds fresh, vital, youthful and energetic. Her latest work, Sapphire, is hot — vocally better than any recent release from any of the female R&B artists currently recording...Burn Sapphire, burn."

Within a B− review, Mario Tarradell of the Dallas Morning News called Sapphire, "another batch of old- meets new-school R&B. She holds her own throughout, sounding stunningly soulful on all 16 tracks...Lady T still excites, which is no small feat 27 years after her debut. She could teach the young, contemporary R&B gals a lick or two."

Andy Kellman of Allmusic, in a 4/5 star review wrote, "As with La Doña, there's the odd verse where Marie sounds like she's trying too hard to be hip. Longtime fans might also be a little surprised to hear Marie more sexed-up than ever, but any faults or jarring traits are canceled out by the supreme excellence of Marie's voice and the quality of the songs she has written and produced...This is another very long album that never runs out of ideas, with plenty of room for some of her classiest throwback ballads and her most up-to-date, colorful jams."

Steve Jones of USA Today in a 3.5/4 star review exclaimed, "Inspired by the death last year of longtime mentor and friend Rick James, she has created a powerful set that recalls her classics while at the same time updating her sound...After all this time, Marie remains a musical jewel."

Kevin C. Johnson of the St Louis Post Dispatch in a B− review claimed, ""Sapphire," like "La Dona," recaptures what Marie's fans originally enjoyed most about her: a deeply soulful voice and romantic themes...despite a few missteps, "Sapphire" reveals what a bit of a gem Marie remains."

== Track listing ==
No.	Title	Writer(s)	Length
1.	"God Has Created"	Smokey Robinson	2:11
2.	"Cruise Control"	Smokey Robinson	5:09
3.	"Baby Whose Is It"	Kurupt	5:05
4.	"Make It Hot"	Teena Marie	4:32
5.	"Ooh Wee"	Kurupt	3:56
6.	"Sleeping with the Enemy"	Doug Grigsby, Teena Marie	5:08
7.	"A.P.B."	Teena Marie	4:51
8.	"Love Is a Gangsta"	Teena Marie	5:18
9.	"Ladies Choice"	Gail Gotti and Queen	4:54
10.	"Somebody Just Like You"	Teena Marie	5:37
11.	"You Blow Me Away"	Teena Marie	6:17
12.	"Simmer Down"	Lady Levi	5:18
13.	"Romantica"	Teena Marie	5:42
14.	"The Way You Love Me"	Teena Marie	5:03
15.	"Ecstasy"	Teena Marie	4:42
16.	"Resilient (Sapphire)"	Alia Rose, George Duke	3:42

== Charts ==
=== Weekly charts ===
Chart (2006)	Peak position
US Billboard 200	24
US Top R&B/Hip-Hop Albums (Billboard)	3

=== Year-end charts ===
Chart (2006)	Position
US Top R&B/Hip-Hop Albums (Billboard)	77
