= Passion Play (album) =

Studio album by Teena Marie
- Released: 1994
- Genres: R&B, blue-eyed soul
- Label: Sarai
- Producers: Teena Marie, Doug Grigsby

Teena Marie chronology
Ivory (1990)	Passion Play (1994)	La Doña (2004)

Professional ratings
Review scores
Source	Rating
The Encyclopedia of Popular Music	2/5 stars
MusicHound R&B: The Essential Album Guide	3/5 stars
Spin Alternative Record Guide	7/10

Passion Play is the tenth album by the American musician Teena Marie, released in 1994. The album was produced by Marie and Doug Grigsby. She had parted company with Epic Records following disappointing sales of her 1990 album Ivory, and Passion Play was released on her own independent label, Sarai. Without the backing of a major label, the album received only limited distribution, sold modestly, and failed to chart. Marie engaged in legal action related to the album's distribution.

Passion Play contains guest contributions from Lenny Kravitz ("Main Squeeze") and rapper Yo-Yo ("Sweet on You"). It also includes a cover of the Linda Jones song "Hypnotized". "Warm as Momma's Oven" was released as a single. Marie supported the album by touring with the Gap Band and Cameo.

== Track listing ==
All songs written by Teena Marie, except where noted.

1. "Warm as Momma's Oven" (Marie, Doug Grigsby)
2. "Main Squeeze" (featuring Lenny Kravitz) (Marie, Grigsby)
3. "Wild Horses"
4. "Smooth Tip" (featuring Lady Levi)
5. "Hypnotized (Prelude)"
6. "Hypnotized" (Poindexter, Spolan)
7. "Parking Music"
8. "Sweet on You" (featuring Yo-Yo) (Marie, Grigsby, Slikk)
9. "Slow Grind" (Marie, Grigsby)
10. "Climb the Walls"
11. "Breakfast in Bed" (Marie, Grigsby)
12. "Passion Play" (Marie, Grigsby)
13. "Pretty Man"
14. "The Air I Breathe"
