= Wild and Peaceful (Teena Marie album) =

Studio album by Teena Marie
- Released: March 31, 1979
- Recorded: August 1978 – January 1979
- Genre: Soul; disco; R&B
- Length: 39:49
- Label: Gordy
- Producer: Rick James; Art Stewart

Teena Marie chronology
| Wild and Peaceful (1979) | Lady T (1980) |

Wild and Peaceful is the debut studio album by American singer-songwriter Teena Marie. Released on March 31, 1979, by Motown. It features significant contributions from Rick James who produced and wrote the bulk of material as well as providing co-vocals on "I'm a Sucker for Your Love".

Wild and Peaceful peaked at #18 on the Black Albums chart and #94 on the Billboard Albums chart. The lead single "I'm a Sucker for Your Love" reached #8 on the US Black Singles chart and #43 in the UK, and was followed by a cover version of "Don't Look Back" originally recorded by The Temptations.

Motown didn't include a photograph of the singer on the album sleeve, leading many listeners to assume she was African-American.

Professional ratings
Review scores
| Source | Rating |
|---|---|
| Allmusic | link |
| Music Week | 3/4 stars |
| Smash Hits | 6/10 |
| Spin Alternative Record Guide | 6/10 |

== Track listing ==
All tracks composed by Rick James, except where indicated.

Side A

1. "I'm a Sucker for Your Love" - 5:52
2. "Turnin' Me On" - 6:06
3. "Don't Look Back" (Cover of The Temptations song) (Smokey Robinson, Ronald White) - 7:32

Side B

1. "Déjà Vu (I've Been Here Before)" - 7:38
2. "I'm Gonna Have My Cake (And Eat It Too)" (Michelle Holland, Teena Marie) - 5:30
3. "I Can't Love Anymore" - 7:11

2005 Expanded Edition

1. "I'm a Sucker for Your Love (Instrumental)" - 5:33
2. "You Got the Love" (Outtake) - 4:34
3. "Every Little Bit Hurts" (Duet with Rick James) (Ed Cobb) - 7:04

== Personnel ==
- Shonda Akiem - percussion
- Wally Ali - guitar
- Oscar Alston - bass guitar
- Jack Andrews - mastering
- Christopher Anthony Boehme - percussion
- Garnett Brown - trombone
- Oscar Brashear - trumpet
- The Colored Girls - backing vocals, ensemble
- Ernie Fields, Jr. - saxophone
- Lanise Hughes - drums
- Rick James - guitar, percussion, piano, arranger, conga, drums, timbales, vocals, backing vocals, timpani, horn and string arrangements, syndrum
- Jean King - backing vocals
- Daniel LeMelle - flute, saxophone on "I'm Gonna Have My Cake (And Eat It Too)"
- Teena Marie - piano, vocals, backing vocals
- David Melle - flute, saxophone
- Earl Palmer - drums on "I'm Gonna Have My Cake"
- Jackie Ruffin - backing vocals
- Levi Ruffin, Jr. - synthesizer
- Lisa Sarna - backing vocals
- Russell Schmitt - engineer
- Clarence Sims - piano, keyboards on "I'm Gonna Have My Cake"
- Art Stewart - producer, engineer, mixing
- Julia Tillman Waters - backing vocals
- Ernie Watts - saxophone
- Maxine Willard Waters - backing vocals
- Adrienne Williams - backing vocals

== Charts ==
| Chart (1979) | Peak position |
|---|---|
| Billboard Pop Albums | 94 |
| Billboard Top Soul Albums | 18 |

=== Singles ===
| Year | Single | Chart positions | | |
| Year | Single | US R&B | US Dance | UK (OCC) |
|---|---|---|---|---|
| 1979 | "I'm a Sucker for Your Love" | 8 | 102 | 43 |
| 1979 | "Don't Look Back" | — | 91 | — |
