= Lady T (album) =

Studio album by Teena Marie
- Released: February 14, 1980
- Recorded: 1979
- Studio: Conway (Hollywood, California)
- Genre: Soul; pop; R&B
- Length: 51:15
- Label: Gordy
- Producer: Richard Rudolph

Teena Marie chronology
| Wild and Peaceful (1979) | Lady T (1980) | Irons in the Fire (1980) |

Professional ratings
Review scores
| Source | Rating |
|---|---|
| AllMusic | 3/5 stars |
| Robert Christgau | B |
| The Rolling Stone Album Guide | 3/5 stars |
| Spin Alternative Record Guide | 5/10 |

Lady T is the second studio album by American singer-songwriter Teena Marie, released by Motown's Gordy label on February 14, 1980.

== Background ==
The album was produced by Richard Rudolph, and the track "Too Many Colors" features the then 7 year-old Maya Rudolph, daughter of Rudolph and his late wife Minnie Riperton. The album was dedicated to Minnie Riperton. Lady T was the nickname of Teena Marie at Motown Records. The packaging of Teena Marie's debut album Wild and Peaceful had not included a picture of the singer, and the image on the sleeve of this album surprised many people who had assumed she was African-American.

Lady T peaked at #18 on the Black Albums chart and #45 on the Pop Albums chart. Lead single "Can It Be Love" was a minor hit on the US Black Singles chart followed by "Behind the Groove" which peaked at #21 on the US Black Singles chart and became Teena Marie's only top 20 hit in the United Kingdom, reaching #6. "Lonely Desire" was released as the final single from the album.

== Track listing ==
Side A

1. "Behind the Groove" (Marie, Richard Rudolph) – 6:06
2. "Now That I Have You" (Art Philips, Richard Rudolph, Claudia Talbott) – 5:32
3. "Lonely Desire" (Marie, Richard Rudolph, Dwayne Wedlaw) – 4:39
4. "Aladdin's Lamp" (Marie) – 4:55

Side B
5. "You're All the Boogie I Need" (Mickey Hearn, Marie) – 5:44
6. "Can It Be Love" (Marie, Dwayne Wedlaw) – 4:24
7. "Young Girl in Love" (Jill Jones, Marie) – 3:55
8. "Why Did I Have to Fall in Love with You" (Marie, George Sopuch) – 4:45
9. "Too Many Colors (Tee's Interlude)" (Marie) – 3:10

1991 Reissue
10. "Why Can't I Get Next to You" (Marie) – 3:58
11. "Co-Pilot to Pilot" (Marie) – 4:23

2011 Expanded Edition
10. Behind The Groove (Original LP Version) – 6:13
11. Behind The Groove (Rick James Mix) – 6:16
12. Behind The Groove (The Missing "M+M" 12-Inch Mix) – 9:13

== Personnel ==
- Teena Marie – acoustic guitar, lead and backing vocals
- Nathan Watts, Eddie Watkins, Oscar Alston on "Behind The Groove" – bass
- Paulinho Da Costa – percussion
- Michael Boddicker – synthesizer
- Jeremy Lubbock – Fender Rhodes
- Randy Waldman – Fender Rhodes, piano, synthesizer
- Greg Hargrove, Tim May, Bob "Boogie" Bowles, Art Phillips – guitar
- Charles A. Glenn, Jr., Eddie N. Watkins, Jr. – bass
- Christopher Anthony Boehme, Paul Hines, Tony "T-Bird" Lewis – drums
- Gary Grant – flugelhorn, trumpet
- Kim Hutchcroft – flute, saxophone
- Jerry Hey – flugelhorn, trumpet
- Charles Loper – trombone
- Steve Forman – percussion
- Everett Bryson, Jr. – congas, percussion
- James S. Stewart, Jr. – piano
- Thomas "T" Bumpass – trumpet, backing vocals
- William Carroll White, Jr. – saxophone, backing vocals
- Larry Williams – flute, saxophone
- Ray C. Woodard – saxophone, backing vocals
- Bob Zimmitti – cowbell, percussion
- Maya Rudolph, Dwayne Medlaw – voices
- Diahnne Abbott, Brenda Lee Eager, Linda Little, Jill Jones, Bill Thedford – backing vocals

== Charts ==
| Chart (1980) | Peak position |
|---|---|
| Billboard Pop Albums | 45 |
| Billboard Top Soul Albums | 18 |

=== Singles ===
| Year | Single | Chart positions | | |
| Year | Single | US R&B | US Dance | UK (OCC) |
|---|---|---|---|---|
| 1980 | "Can It Be Love" | 57 | — | — |
| 1980 | "Behind the Groove" | 21 | 4 | 6 |
