= Ooo La La La (Teena Marie song) =

1988 single by Teena Marie

Single by Teena Marie

from the album Naked to the World
- Released: 1988 (U.S.)
- Genre: Soul; R&B
- Length: 5:17
- Label: Epic
- Songwriters: Teena Marie; Allen McGrier
- Producer: Teena Marie

Teena Marie singles chronology
| "Love Me Down Easy" (1986) | "Ooo La La La" (1988) | "Work It" (1988) |

"Ooo La La La" is a single by American R&B singer Teena Marie, which was released in 1988 and is featured on her album Naked to the World, released during the same year. The single became Teena Marie's biggest hit on the R&B chart. "Ooo La La La" peaked at number one on the Billboard R&B chart, and Marie's only number-one single on that chart. It peaked at number 85 on the Billboard Hot 100.

The single had a resurgence in popularity when the song was interpolated by the Fugees on the group's 1996 hit single "Fu-Gee-La". That same year, this song was covered by Experience Unlimited on their album Make Money. Trey Songz also heavily sampled the chorus of the song in his 2014 hit "Na Na". It was also covered by the trip hop group Attica Blues on a Japan-exclusive single release in 1998. American singer Beyoncé sampled "Ooo La La La" for her single "Energy" for her seventh studio album Renaissance (2022).

== Charts ==
| Chart (1988) | Peak position |
|---|---|
| UK Singles Chart | 74 |
| US Billboard Hot 100 | 85 |
| US Billboard Hot Black Singles | 1 |
