= Naked to the World =

Studio album by Teena Marie
- Released: March 21, 1988
- Recorded: 1987
- Studio: Smoketree Ranch, Ocean Way Recording, Bedrock Studios
- Genre: R&B; soul; freestyle; funk
- Length: 54:23
- Label: Epic
- Producer: Teena Marie

Teena Marie chronology
Emerald City (1986)	Naked to the World (1988)	Ivory (1990)

Naked to the World is the eighth album by Teena Marie, released on March 21, 1988. It is a return to her soul/funk roots following the experimentation of her previous album Emerald City, which had been a critical and commercial disappointment.

Naked to the World peaked at #15 on the Black Albums chart and #65 on the Billboard Albums chart. The lead single, "Ooo La La La", was #1 on the US Black Singles chart, Marie's only single to achieve this status. "Work It" peaked at #10 on the US Black Singles chart, followed by the non-charting "Surrealistic Pillow". The tracks "Call Me (I Got Yo Number)" and "The Once and Future Dream" reunited Teena with former mentor and duet partner Rick James. The album also included Marie's first collaboration with Klymaxx star Bernadette Cooper on the track "Crocodile Tears". Marie subsequently appeared on her album Drama According To Bernadette Cooper the following year.

This album has been reissued in May 2012 by SoulMusic Records, with four bonus tracks.

Professional ratings
Review scores
Source	Rating
AllMusic	3.5/5 stars
Spin Alternative Record Guide	6/10

== Track listing ==
All songs written by Teena Marie, except where noted.

1. "Trick Bag" - 5:31
2. "Call Me (I Got Yo Number)" (Marie, Allen McGrier) - 5:38
3. "Ooo La La La" (Marie, McGrier) - 5:19
4. "Crocodile Tears" - 6:20
5. "Opus III: The Second Movement" - 1:12
6. "Surrealistic Pillow" - 5:43
7. "The Once and Future Dream" - 7:43
8. "Work It" (Marie, Penny "P.J." Johnson) - 5:50
9. "The Ball" - 4:40
10. "Naked to the World" - 6:20

Bonus tracks - 2012 SoulMusic reissue

1. "Ooo La La La" (US 12” version) - Expanded Edition
2. "Sing One to Your Love" (US Instrumental Version of "Ooo La La La") - Expanded Edition
3. "Work It" (US Special 12" Hip Hop Mix) - Expanded Edition
4. "Surrealistic Pillow" (US Sexy Pillow Remix) - Expanded Edition

== Charts ==
=== Weekly charts ===
Chart (1988)	Peak position
US Billboard 200	65
US Top R&B/Hip-Hop Albums (Billboard)	15

=== Year-end charts ===
Chart (1988)	Position
US Top R&B/Hip-Hop Albums (Billboard)	50
