= It Must Be Magic =

Studio album by Teena Marie
- Released: May 14, 1981
- Recorded: 1980–81
- Genres: R&B; soul; post-disco; funk
- Length: 44:30 (original release); 63:37 (expanded edition)
- Label: Gordy
- Producer: Teena Marie

Teena Marie chronology
Irons in the Fire (1980)	It Must Be Magic (1981)	Robbery (1983)

Singles from It Must Be Magic
- 1. "Square Biz" Released: June 16, 1981; 2. "It Must Be Magic" Released: October 1981; 3. "Portuguese Love" Released: October 1981

Professional ratings
Review scores
Source	Rating
AllMusic	3.5/5 stars
Robert Christgau	A−
Spin Alternative Record Guide	7/10

It Must Be Magic is the fourth studio album by Teena Marie, released on May 14, 1981. It was her last album for Motown and the highest-selling of Marie's tenure with Motown. The album peaked at No. 2 on the US Black Albums chart and No. 23 on the Pop Albums chart.

Lead single "Square Biz" became her most commercially successful for the label - peaking at No. 3 on Billboard's Black Singles chart and No. 12 on Billboard's Club Play Singles, while performing moderately on Billboard's Pop Singles, peaking at No. 50, becoming her second single to chart on the Pop Singles chart. This was followed up by No. 30 US Black Singles success for the title track, featuring label mates The Temptations, and the Quiet storm classic "Portuguese Love".

Like Irons in the Fire, it was fully written and produced by Marie herself, and received a positive critical reception, earning the album a nomination for Best Female R&B Vocal Performance at the 1982 Grammy Awards.

In 2002, the album was re-released in a remastered and expanded CD edition containing three additional tracks (two of which were recorded during a live concert in Long Beach, California).

== Track listing ==
All songs written by Teena Marie, except where noted.

1. "It Must Be Magic" – 6:03
2. "Revolution" – 4:27
3. "Where's California" – 5:24
4. "365" – 4:10
5. "Opus III (Does Anybody Care)" – 1:27
6. "Square Biz" (Marie, Allen McGrier) – 6:40
7. "The Ballad of Cradle Rob and Me" (Marie, Jill D. Jones) – 3:24
8. "Portuguese Love" – 7:17
9. "Yes Indeed" – 4:57

Bonus tracks - 2002 Expanded Edition

1. "Square Biz [Instrumental]" – 6:40 (expanded edition)
2. "Someday We'll All Be Free" (Donny Hathaway/Edward Howard) – 1:57 (expanded edition - live recording)
3. "Déjà Vu" (Rick James) – 12:26 (expanded edition - live recording)

== Personnel ==
- Teena Marie - Lead and Backing Vocals, Synthesizer
- Patrice Rushen, Scott Markus DeTurk, James S. Stewart Jr. - Keyboards
- Allen McGrier, Oscar Alston, Charles A. Glenn Jr. - Bass
- Tom McDermott, Josef Andre Parson - Guitar
- Paul Hines - Drums
- Bill Wolfer, Allen McGrier - Synthesizer
- Lloyd Lindroth - Harp
- Daniel LeMelle - Saxophone
- Gerald Albright - Saxophone, Tenor Flute
- John Ervin - Trombone, Flute
- Eric Butler, Kenneth Scott - Trumpet
- Cliff Ervin, Roy Poper - Piccolo Trumpet
- Rick James, Diedra Joseph, Glenn Carl Leonard, Jackie Ruffin, Jill D. Jones, Melvin Franklin, Mickey Boyce Hearn, Otis Williams, Julia Waters, Maxine Waters, Pattie Brooks, Anthony Brockert, Christopher Anthony Boehme, Diedra Joseph, Dwayne Wedlan, Ginny Pallante, Grayland Taylor, Ray Townsend - Backing Vocals

== Charts ==
=== Weekly charts ===
Chart (1981)	Peak position
US Billboard 200	23
US Top R&B/Hip-Hop Albums (Billboard)	2

=== Year-end charts ===
Chart (1981)	Position
US Billboard 200	88
US Top R&B/Hip-Hop Albums (Billboard)	21

=== Singles ===
Year	Single	Chart positions		
Year	Single	US	US R&B	US Dance
1981	"Square Biz"	50	3	12
1981	"It Must Be Magic"	—	30	—
1982	"Portuguese Love"	—	54	—

== Certifications ==
Region	Certification	Certified units/sales
United States (RIAA)	Gold	500,000^{^}
^{^} Shipments figures based on certification alone.

== Later Samples ==
- "Square Biz"
  - "Firm Biz" by the Firm from their self-titled album
  - "Crip Hop" by tha Eastsidaz from the album Duces 'n Trayz: The Old Fashioned Way
  - "Love U So" by Mase from the album Harlem World
- "Portuguese Love"
  - "Child of the Night" ft. Nate Dogg by Ludacris from The Red Light District
  - "AAA" by Flo from the album Access All Areas
