= Teena Marie =

American soul and R&B singer (1956–2010)

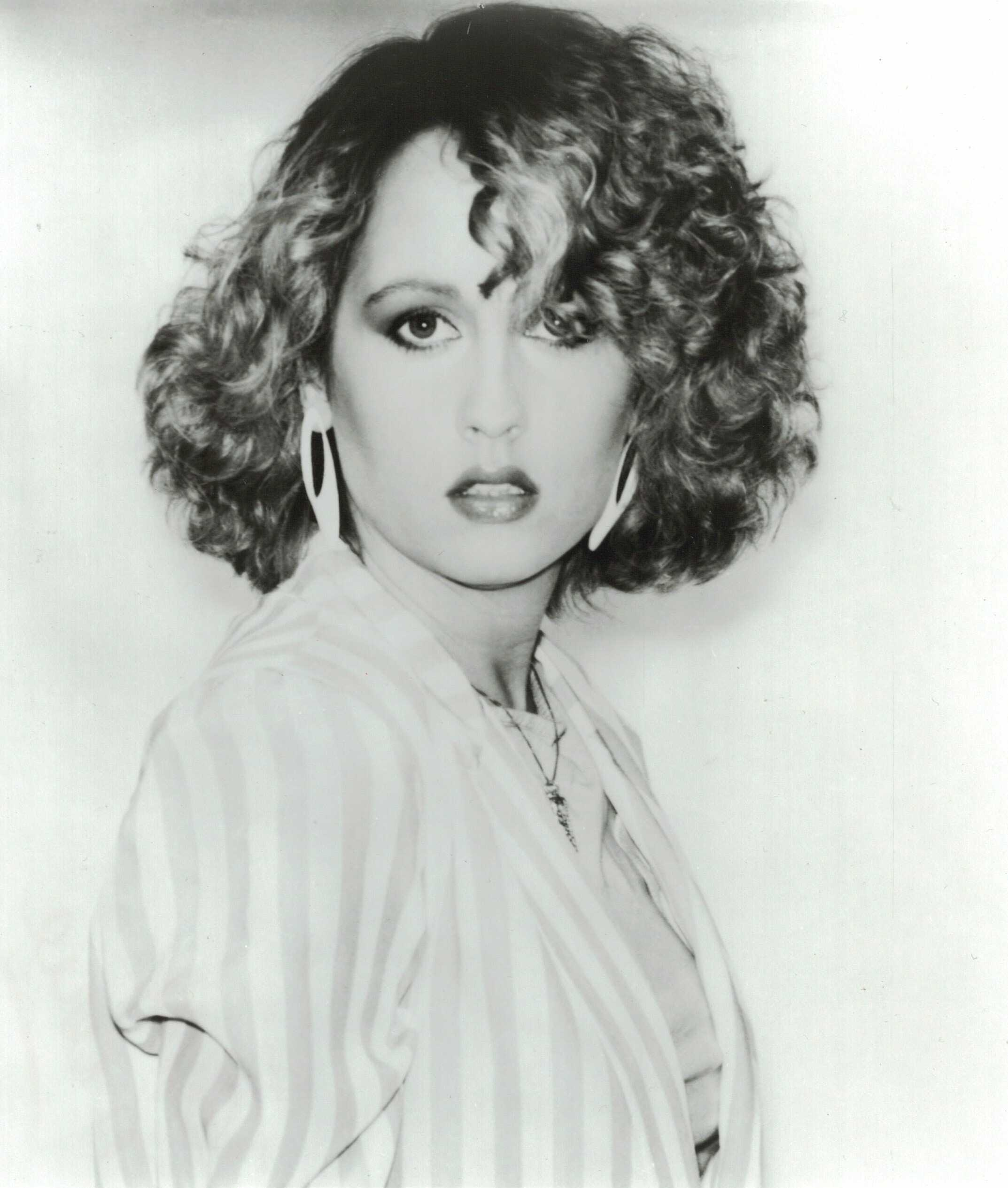
- Teena Marie in 1983

Background information
- Also known as: Tina, Lady T
- Born: Mary Christine Brockert; March 5, 1956; Santa Monica, California, U.S.
- Died: December 26, 2010 (aged 54) Pasadena, California, U.S.
- Genres: Soul; R&B; funk; hip hop; jazz; disco
- Occupations: Singer; songwriter; musician; record producer; arranger
- Instruments: Vocals; guitar; keyboards; percussion
- Years active: 1964–2010
- Labels: Gordy; Epic; CBS; Hollywood; Cash Money; Universal; Stax; Motown; Concord

Mary Christine Brockert (March 5, 1956 – December 26, 2010), known professionally as Teena Marie, was an American soul and R&B singer, songwriter and producer. She was known by her childhood nickname Tina before taking the stage name Teena Marie and later acquired the nickname Lady T, given to her by her collaborator and friend Rick James.

She was known for her distinctive and soulful soprano vocals, which caused many listeners to believe she was black. Her success in R&B and soul music, and loyalty to these genres earned her the title Ivory Queen of Soul. She played rhythm guitar, keyboards, and congas. Teena Marie was a four-time Grammy Award nominee, winning posthumously in 2023 for Best R&B Song for co-writing "Cuff It".

== Early life ==
Mary Christine Brockert was born on March 5, 1956, in Santa Monica, California, the daughter of construction worker Thomas Leslie Brockert and home renovator Mary Anne. She spent her early childhood in Mission Hills, California. She said that her ethnic heritage was Belgian, Portuguese, Italian, Irish, and Native American. In 2005, while visiting Louisiana, she discovered that her paternal ancestors once lived in New Orleans. She took to singing naturally, performing Harry Belafonte's "Banana Boat Song" by age 2.

When she was eight years old, her parents began sending Tina on auditions which, among other things, netted her an acting role on The Beverly Hillbillies, in season 3 episode “Dr. Jed Clampett,” credited as Tina Marie Brockert. She later taught herself the guitar, bass, and congas. She formed a semi-professional R&B band with her younger brother Anthony and their cousin.

In the early 1970s, after the family moved to Venice, California, Brockert spent her adolescent years in the historically black Venice enclave of Oakwood, nicknamed "Venice Harlem". There, she acquired a strong spiritual influence from neighborhood matriarch Berthalynn Jackson, a black woman who became her godmother.

While attending Venice High School, Brockert joined the Summer Dance Production and was the female lead in the school's production of The Music Man. She also fronted a local Venice rock band "Truvair" in 1974–1975. The band's members were her high school classmates. Following graduation, Brockert juggled auditioning for record companies while studying English literature at Santa Monica College.

== Career ==
=== 1976–1982: Gordy era ===
In 1976, Brockert, as the lead singer of a band she had assembled, which included long-time friend Mickey Boyce, gained an introduction to Motown Records staff producer Hal Davis, best known for his work with Brenda Holloway and the Jackson 5. It led to an audition for a film about orphans that was being developed by Motown. The project was shelved, but label boss Berry Gordy, impressed with her singing but having no need for a musical group, decided to sign her as a solo act.

Tina recorded unreleased material with a number of different producers over the next few years, before being spotted by labelmate Rick James, who was immediately impressed with her sound. Some of Tina's earlier, unreleased material has been made available on the compilation album First Class Love: Rare Tee. At the time, James, already established as a successful recording artist, was on tap to produce for Diana Ross but changed his mind and decided to work with Brockert, instead.

The result was her debut album release, Wild and Peaceful. The album was, at one point, due to be credited to "Teena Tryson", but ultimately was put out under "Teena Marie", the name by which she was known throughout her remaining career. It scored Teena Marie her first top-ten R&B hit "I'm a Sucker for Your Love" (#8 Hot Soul Singles), a duet with James.

Neither the album nor its packaging had her picture on it, and many radio programmers assumed she was black during the earliest months of her career. This myth was disproved when she performed her debut hit with James on Soul Train in 1979, becoming the show's first white female guest. She appeared on the show eight more times, more than any other white act.

In 1980, her album Lady T, featured her portrait on the cover. It is noted for having production from Richard Rudolph, the widower of R&B singer Minnie Riperton. Teena Marie had asked Berry Gordy to contact Rudolph and secure his input, as Rick James was unavailable, and she felt unprepared to be sole producer of her own material. Rudolph had intended for "Now That I Have You", a song he penned, for his wife Minnie Riperton, but offered it to Teena Marie for Lady T. Rudolph co-composed the single "Behind the Groove", which reached number 21 on the Billboard Hot Soul Singles chart and No. 6 on the U.K. singles chart in 1980. The song was included on the soundtrack of Grand Theft Auto: Vice City on the Fever 105 radio station.

In 1980, Teena Marie released the LP Irons in the Fire, for which she handled most of the writing and production herself, an achievement considered rare at the time for a female artist. The single "I Need Your Lovin'" (#37 Billboard Hot 100, No. 9 Hot Soul Singles) brought Teena Marie her first top 40 crossover pop hit. It peaked at No. 28 in the UK chart. She performed the song on American Bandstand.

In 1981, Teena Marie appeared on James' album Street Songs, with the duet "Fire and Desire". In an interview, Teena Marie said she had a fever at the time yet managed to record her vocals in one take. After the session, she was driven to a hospital. Despite the song not being released as a single, it was heavily rotated on R&B radio stations, continuing for many decades onwards. The two performed the single at the 2004 BET Awards, which was their last TV appearance with one another, as James died later that year. Teena Marie also sang background on the album's hit "Give It to Me, Baby" and also on the socially conscious track, "Mr. Policeman", which also featured Stevie Wonder playing an accompanying harmonica.

In 1981, Teena Marie continued her success with Motown, with the release of It Must Be Magic (#2 Top Selling Soul Albums Chart), her first gold record, which included her then biggest hit on the R&B charts, "Square Biz" (#3 Hot Soul Singles). Other notable tracks include "Portuguese Love", featuring a brief, uncredited cameo by James, No. 54 Soul Singles, and the title track "It Must Be Magic" (#30 Soul Singles), featuring the Temptations singing background.

In 1982, Teena Marie got into a heated legal battle with Motown Records over her contract and disagreements about releasing her new material. The lawsuit resulted in "The Brockert Initiative", which made it illegal for a record company to keep an artist under contract without releasing new material for that artist. In such instances, artists are able to sign and release with another label instead of being held back by an unsupportive one.

Teena Marie commented on the law in a Los Angeles Times article, saying "It wasn't something I set out to do. I just wanted to get away from Motown and have a good life. But it helped a lot of people, like Luther Vandross and the Mary Jane Girls, and a lot of different artists, to be able to get out of their contracts." She left Motown as the label's most successful white solo act.

=== 1983–1990: Epic era ===
Contacted by Epic Records in the fall of 1982, after expressing dismay over her Motown contract, Teena Marie signed a worldwide deal with the Columbia Records subsidiary, that also allowed her to establish her own publishing company, Midnight Magnet. Epic released the concept album Robbery, which featured the hit "Fix It" (#21 Black Singles), as well as "Shadow Boxing" and "Casanova Brown". Casanova Brown was one of many tracks Teena Marie wrote over the years about her real-life romance with one-time mentor Rick James.

In 1984, Teena Marie released her biggest-selling album Starchild. It yielded "Lovergirl", her biggest hit, which peaked at No. 4 on the U.S. Billboard Hot 100 chart in March 1985 and at No. 9 on the R&B chart. "Lovergirl" was included in the 2002 Jennifer Lopez movie Maid in Manhattan. The label also released the moderate R&B hit "Out on a Limb", which peaked at No. 56 on the R&B chart but didn't break the Hot 100. "14k" was featured on the soundtrack of the 1985 film The Goonies, but the song was not a hit.

In 1986, Teena Marie released a rock music-influenced concept album titled Emerald City. She recorded the rock-influenced track "Lead Me On", co-produced by Giorgio Moroder, for the soundtrack of the 1986 box-office hit film Top Gun.

In 1988, she returned to R&B and funk, releasing the critically acclaimed album Naked to the World. That album contained the hit "Ooo La La La", which reached # 1 on the Billboard's Hot Black Singles chart.

In the fall of 1990, Teena Marie released Ivory. It had two R&B hits: "Here's Looking at You" (#11 Hot Black Singles) and "If I Were a Bell" (#8 Hot Black Singles).

=== 1991–2002: Hiatus and Passion Play and Black Rain ===
In the 1990s, Teena Marie's classic R&B, soul, and funk records were either sampled by hip-hop artists or covered by younger R&B artists. Teena Marie is regarded as somewhat of a pioneer in helping to bring hip-hop to the mainstream, by becoming one of the first artists of her time to rap one of her singles—the aforementioned "Square Biz". In the hip-hop portion of that song, she mentions some of her inspirations: Sarah Vaughan, Johann Sebastian Bach, Shakespeare, Maya Angelou, and Nikki Giovanni. In 1996, the Fugees paid tribute to her by interpolating the chorus of her 1988 hit "Ooo, La, La, La", into its own "Fu-Gee-La".

In the fall of 1994, Teena Marie released Passion Play on her independent label, Sarai Records.

On March 30, 1995, Teena Marie appeared and performed in an episode of New York Undercover as an old friend of one of the characters.

Subsequently, Teena Marie devoted most of her time to raising her daughter Alia Rose, who has since adopted the stage name "Rose Le Beau" and is pursuing her own singing career. In the late 1990s, she began working on a new album, titled Black Rain. She was unable to secure a major label deal for the album and did not want to put it out on her own Sarai label, in light of the modest sales of Passion Play. However, a version pressed for promotional purposes was widely bootlegged among fans. This contained the tracks, "The Mackin' Game", "I'll Take the Pressure", "Baby, I'm Your Fiend", "My Body's Hungry", "Ecstasy", "I'm on Fire", "Watcha Got 4 Me", "Black Rain", "1999", "Butterflies", "Spanish Harlem", "Blackberry Playa", "The Perfect Feeling", and "Rainbow Outro".

=== 2003–2010: La Doña to Congo Square ===
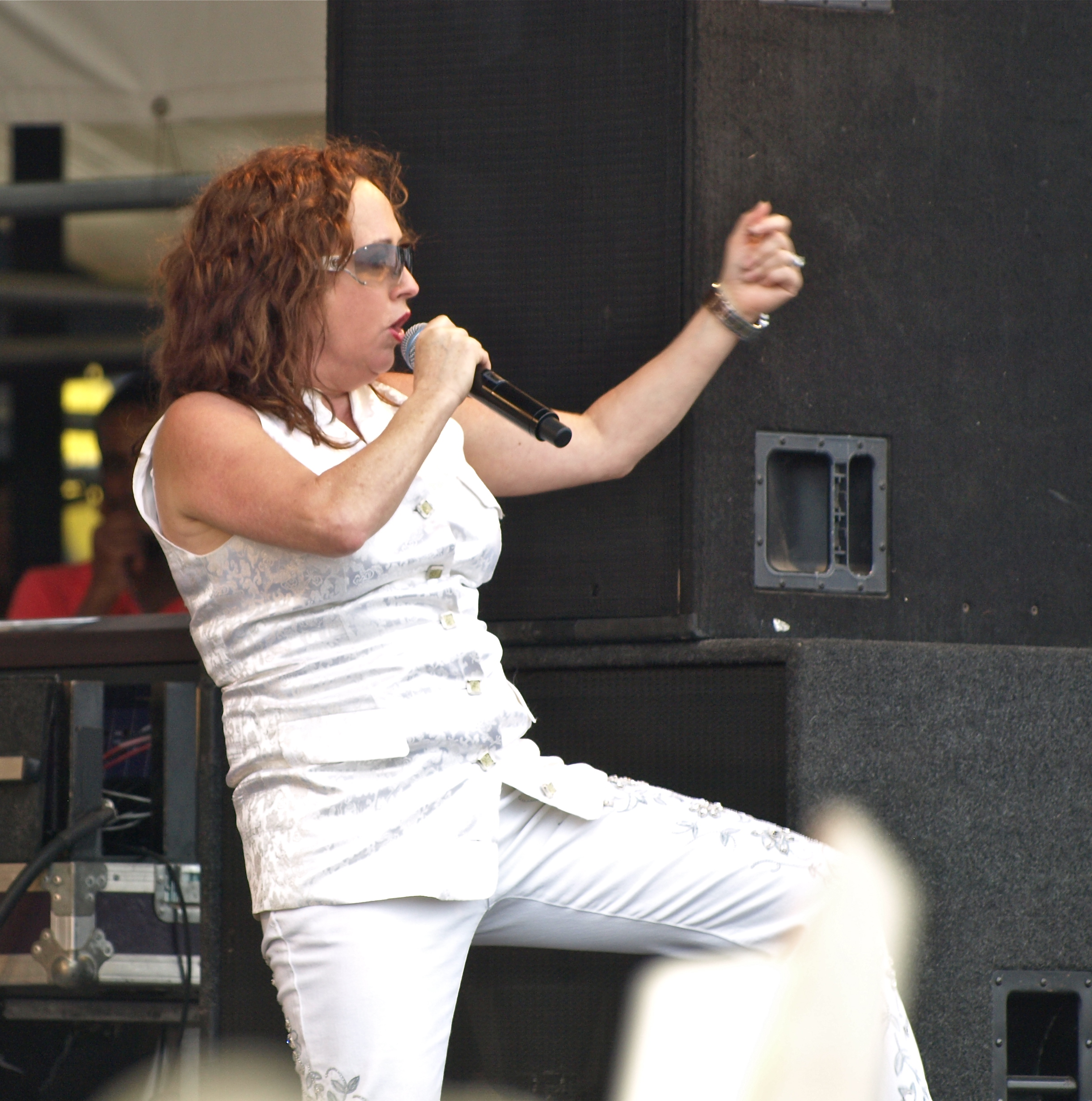
Marie performing in May 2010, less than eight months before her death

After a ten-year hiatus from the music industry, Teena Marie returned to her musical career by signing with the Classics sub-label of the successful hip-hop label, Cash Money Records. She released the album La Doña in 2004, and follow up Sapphire in 2006. La Doña became a gold-certified success, and the highest-charting album of her career, peaking at No. 6 on the Billboard 200 chart, on the basis of the Al Green-sampled "I'm Still in Love" (#23 R&B, No. 70 Pop) and "A Rose by Any Other Name", a duet with Gerald Levert.

The Sapphire album peaked at No. 24 on the Billboard 200 chart, yielding yet another "R&B" Top-40 hit, "Ooh Wee" (#32). Sapphire reunited Teena with Smokey Robinson, one of her musical idols, on "God Has Created" and "Cruise Control". Teena Marie parted ways with Cash Money records after the release of Sapphire.

On September 19, 2008, Teena Marie performed in concert at B.B. King's Blues Club in New York City. She took this time to play a couple of finished tracks from her upcoming album Congo Square and received a positive response from the audience. Congo Square was released on June 9, 2009, on Stax/Concord Records. Teena Marie has described the album as "personal and spiritual", and indicated that it was more jazz-influenced than most of her previous work.

In March 2009, "Can't Last a Day", a duet with Faith Evans, leaked to the Internet. Teena Marie says of Evans: "It was after I had recorded the song ("Can't Last a Day") I got the idea to put Faith on it. I've always loved Faith and her vocal style. She reminds me of me. Her correlation with Biggie – having a career with him and without him – reminds me of me and Rick. I feel like she's a younger me. Of the younger ladies, she's the one I love most."

In January 2010, regarding the early-life inspirations for Congo Square, Teena Marie told Blues & Soul magazine editor Lee Tyler: "I wanted to do songs that reflected the things that I loved when I was growing up. Every single song on the record is dedicated to someone, or some musical giant that I loved. 'The Pressure' is dedicated to Rick James; 'Can't Last a Day' is dedicated to the Gamble & Huff sound – the Philly International sound'. Then 'Baby I Love You' and 'Ear Candy' are dedicated to Marvin Gaye and Curtis Mayfield – with memories of riding down Crenshaw in LA in jeeps and bumping to music on the 808 i.e. Roland TR-808 drum machine. While 'Miss Coretta' is, of course, dedicated to Mrs. Coretta Scott King, the late wife of Martin Luther King."

Sales-wise, the album proved another success, reaching the Top 20 on Billboard's Top 200, and giving Teena Marie yet another Top 10 R&B chart entry. In 2010, Teena Marie continued to be a headliner on the Las Vegas Strip, appearing regularly at the Las Vegas Hilton and other venues until just before her death.

At the time of her death, Teena Marie had been in the process of completing her album Beautiful. It was finished posthumously by her daughter Alia Rose and released on January 15, 2013.

== Personal life ==
Teena Marie gave birth to a daughter, Alia Rose, on December 25, 1991, whom she had with a man named Peter Butcher. Alia Rose would grow up following in her mother's footsteps, often dueting with Marie during live shows and being featured on some of Marie's songs on her last four albums (La Doña to Beautiful). Alia went under the name Rose LeBeau in the late 2000s. Since 2015 she has released songs under her original name.

Teena Marie lived in various neighborhoods and cities throughout greater Los Angeles, including Santa Monica, Inglewood, Pasadena, and Marina Del Rey.

Teena Marie was godmother to American actress and comedian Maya Rudolph, daughter of singer-songwriter Minnie Riperton, as well as Marvin Gaye's daughter Nona Gaye. She also cared for Rick James's son Rick, Jr. and family friend Jeremiah O'Neal. Lenny Kravitz posted a video in which he said that Teena Marie had taken him into her home and helped him when he was struggling early in his career.

== Death ==
In 2004, while Teena Marie was sleeping in a hotel room, a large picture frame fell and struck her on the head. The blow caused a serious concussion that resulted in momentary seizures for the rest of her life.

On the afternoon of December 26, 2010, Teena Marie was found dead by her daughter, Alia Rose, in her Pasadena home. On December 30, 2010, an autopsy was performed by the coroner of Los Angeles County, who found no signs of apparent trauma or a discernible cause of death, and concluded she had died from natural causes. She had suffered a grand mal seizure a month before.

A memorial service for Teena Marie was held at Forest Lawn Cemetery on January 10, 2011. Among those in attendance were Stevie Wonder, Deniece Williams, Smokey Robinson, Queen Latifah, LisaRaye, Sinbad, Tichina Arnold, Shanice, and Berry Gordy.

== Discography ==
Studio albums

- Wild and Peaceful (1979)
- Lady T (1980)
- Irons in the Fire (1980)
- It Must Be Magic (1981)
- Robbery (1983)
- Starchild (1984)
- Emerald City (1986)
- Naked to the World (1988)
- Ivory (1990)
- Passion Play (1994)
- La Doña (2004)
- Sapphire (2006)
- Congo Square (2009)
- Beautiful (2013)
