= Benny Medina =

American record executive, talent manager, and television producer (born 1958)

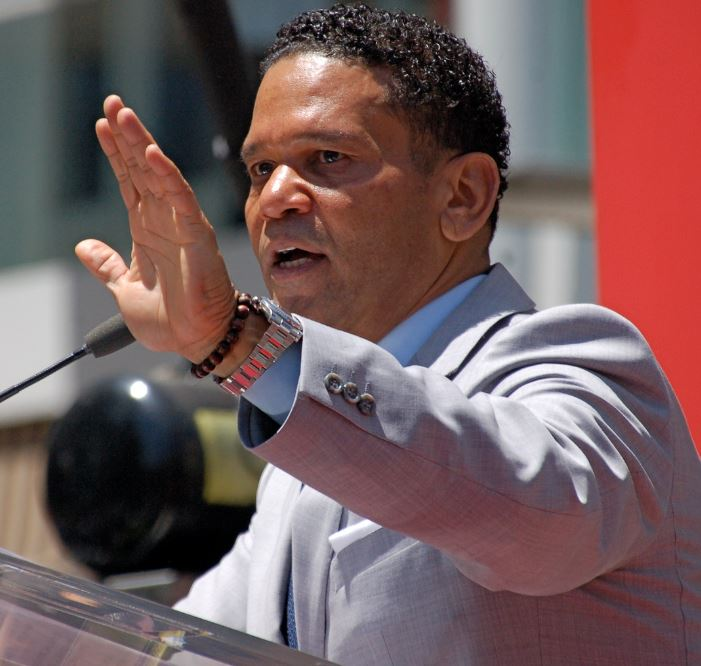
- Medina in June 2013
- Born: January 24, 1958 (age 68); East Los Angeles, California, U.S.
- Occupation: Producer
- Years active: 1979–present

Benny Medina (born January 24, 1958) is an American record executive, talent manager, and television producer.

== Early life and education ==
Medina was born in East Los Angeles, California, into a poor family. The death of his mother and abandonment by his father resulted in him being placed into a number of foster homes, which he repeatedly ran away from before he and his siblings were taken in by his aunt. In his early teenage years, Medina dealt cannabis and amphetamines.

He befriended a wealthy white teenager, whose family in Beverly Hills allowed him to live in a refurbished garage behind their property. Medina then attended Beverly Hills High where he met Kerry Gordy and was a successful student. Medina's experiences of transferring to this wealthy environment is the loose basis for The Fresh Prince of Bel-Air.

== Career ==
Medina started his career with the group Apollo, who released their self-titled debut on Gordy/Motown in 1979. He was the lead singer. Other members included Kerry Gordy (keyboards), Cliff Liles (bass), Lenny Greene (drums) and Larry Robinson (guitar). Medina co-wrote three of the seven tracks, including “Astro Disco,” their best known track. The album was produced by Ray Singleton, former wife of Motown founder Berry Gordy.

At age 24, Medina became the head of A&R for Motown, working as a protégé to Berry Gordy. Under Gordy, Medina wrote and produced for legendary Motown acts such as The Temptations, Smokey Robinson, Billy Preston, Rick James and Teena Marie.

Medina then moved on to Warner Bros. Records, where executive Mo Ostin tasked him to build and cultivate the careers of the company's urban artists as VP/GM of its urban-music division. While there, Medina collaborated with artists such as Ray Charles, Babyface, Prince, Chaka Khan, Madonna, Paul Simon and Fleetwood Mac. He also worked with Naughty by Nature, Queen Latifah, De La Soul, Biz Markie, Kool G. Rap, Big Daddy Kane, Roxanne Shanté, and Monie Love.

After leaving Warner Bros., Medina and longtime friend Jeff Pollack formed Medina/Pollack Entertainment, which grew into a full service management and production company. Among their projects were Booty Call, Above the Rim, and Maid in Manhattan.

In early 2009, Medina formed The Medina Company.

=== Management clients ===
Medina managed Jennifer Lopez, and along with then-head of Sony Music, Tommy Mottola, Medina launched Lopez's pop music career in 1999, after which, in 2003, at the height of her popularity, Lopez fired Medina and filed a complaint against him with California's labor commission. As of 2008, Medina officially resumed his role as Lopez's manager, and is also a godparent to her twin children.

Other clients were also managed by Medina, including Tyra Banks and P. Diddy. Medina also managed singer-songwriter Vanessa Daou from 1996 to 1998 while the artist was signed to Krasnow Entertainment/MCA Records. Medina also managed Mariah Carey from 2003 to 2008. Carey later parted ways from Medina's Handprint Entertainment to represent herself, with her own Maroon Entertainment.

== Sexual assault allegations ==
In November 2017, actor Jason Dottley accused Medina of attempting to rape him in December 2008. Dottley stated the event happened at Medina's Los Angeles mansion after Medina gave Dottley and fellow actor T. Ashanti Mozelle a tour of the home. Dottley stated in an interview with The Advocate that Anthony Rapp's recent sexual assault allegations against Kevin Spacey inspired him to come out with his "shameful secret." Through his attorneys Howard Weitzman and Shawn Holley, Medina said in a statement, "Benny Medina categorically denies the allegation of attempted rape."
