= Somebody's Watching Me (album) =

1984 studio album by Rockwell

Studio album by Rockwell
- Released: January 30, 1984
- Recorded: 1983
- Genre: R&B; funk; synth-pop
- Length: 36:29
- Label: Motown
- Producer: Curtis Anthony Nolen; Rockwell

Rockwell chronology
Somebody's Watching Me (1984)	Captured (1985)

Singles from Somebody's Watching Me
- 1. "Somebody's Watching Me" Released: December 1983; 2. "Obscene Phone Caller" Released: April 1984; 3. "Taxman" Released: July 1984 (Europe); 4. "Knife" Released: 1984 (Brazil)

Somebody's Watching Me is the debut studio album by American singer-songwriter Rockwell, released in 1984 on Motown. It features the title track (with Michael Jackson on vocals in the chorus), as well as the US top 40 hit "Obscene Phone Caller"; however, the next two singles, the power ballad "Knife" and a cover of the Beatles' "Taxman", failed to reach the top 40.

== Background ==
After being kicked out of the house by his father, Motown founder Berry Gordy, Kennedy Gordy moved in with Ray Singleton, Gordy's ex-wife. While living there, the younger Gordy began working on some music. Seeing the youngster's potential, Singleton successfully lobbied to get Kennedy a staff writing job at Jobete.

One night, Singleton overheard Kennedy working on the track, "Somebody's Watching Me" and believed it was a song worthy of recording. When Motown staff producer Curtis Anthony Nolen took an interest in the song, he was hired as the producer on the project. While working on the song in the studio, Kennedy got the idea to try to get his old friend Michael Jackson to provide backing vocals. He brought a boombox to Jackson's residence and played it for him several times, piquing the latter's interest. Kennedy drove Jackson to the studio, where Kennedy asked him to record the chorus with him and Jackson agreed.

Once the track was mixed, Singleton could not wait to play it for Berry Gordy, who thought one of the voices sounded familiar, but could not identify it. When Gordy found out it was Michael Jackson, he was elated.

Not wanting the Gordy name to influence the outcome of the song (his half-brother Kerry Gordy, recorded under his own name five years earlier without success), Kennedy decided to use the name Rockwell on the record. The title cut was one of the biggest singles of 1984 and both the album and single were certified Gold. It was easily the most successful record by a Gordy as a recording artist. Rockwell now gained an exalted position among the Gordy offspring.

In mid-2021, the full album was released on iTunes for the first time. A deluxe edition was also released, containing additional extended and instrumental mixes, as well as a new remix of the title track.

== Reception ==
Professional ratings
Review scores
Source	Rating
AllMusic	4/5 stars

Somebody's Watching Me was released to mixed reviews. Rick A. Bueche of AllMusic called the record "an impressive debut set with an emphasis on rock instrumentals". Dennis Hunt of The News Tribune summarized the album as "rather subtle, sophisticated funk." While he noted that it did not break much new ground for pop-R&B, it was still of a quality most artists most artists would take year into their career to emulate. Paul Benedetti of The Hamilton Spectator described most of the album as "low-energy synth pop, that is either stupid, boring, or both," while the title track and "Obscene Phone Caller" are examples of "pop paranoia" done in Rockwell's "annoying English accent."

== Track listing ==
No.	Title	Writer(s)	Length
1.	"Somebody's Watching Me"	Rockwell	4:59
2.	"Obscene Phone Caller"	Rockwell	3:29
3.	"Taxman"	George Harrison	3:57
4.	"Change Your Ways"	Norman Dozier, Curtis Anthony Nolen, Rockwell	4:25
5.	"Runaway"	Dozier, Nolen, Rockwell	4:23
6.	"Wasting Away"	Dozier, Nolen, Rockwell	3:56
7.	"Knife"	Mitchell Bottler, Norma Helms, Rockwell	5:07
8.	"Foreign Country"	Dozier, Nolen, Rockwell	6:05

=== Deluxe edition bonus tracks ===
1. "Somebody's Watching Me" (John Morales M+M Extended Mix) – 7:06
2. "Obscene Phone Caller" (12" Version) – 4:33
3. "Change Your Ways" (12" Version) – 5:53
4. "Runaway" (12" Version) – 5:36
5. "Somebody's Watching Me" (12" Instrumental) – 5:27
6. "Obscene Phone Caller" (12" Instrumental) – 5:20
7. "Taxman" (Instrumental) – 3:53
8. "Change Your Ways" (12" Instrumental) – 5:53
9. "Wasting Away" (Instrumental) – 3:58
10. "Foreign Country" (12" Instrumental) – 6:02

== Notes ==
An up-tempo version of "Knife" was released by another Motown artist, Monalisa Young. She also appears on this album as a background vocalist.

== Personnel ==
- Rockwell – lead vocals, keyboards, synthesizers, drums, percussion
- Teri DeSario, Norman Dozier, Oma Drake, Marva Holcolm, Jermaine Jackson, Michael Jackson, Lyndie White, Monalisa Young and Terry Young – backing vocals
- Nicholas Brown and Thomas J. Parker – electric guitar
- Dave Cochran – bass guitar
- Norman Dozier, Russell Ferrante, Jim Foeber, Gregg Karukas, Michael Lang, Anthony Santosusso and Randy Waldman – keyboards, synthesizers
- Ricky Lawson, Phillip Madayag and Anthony Santosusso – drums, percussion

=== Production ===
- Producer: Curtis Anthony Nolen for Super Three Productions
- Recorded at Mars Recording Studios, Los Angeles, California
- Recording engineers: Arne Frager, Joe Q. Hall, Scott Skidmore, Booker T. Jones III
- Mixed by Arne Frager, Curtis Anthony Nolen, Rockwell, Joe Q. Hall, Steve Smith
- Mastering engineer: John Matousek
- Art direction: Johnny Lee
- Design: Janet Levinson
- Visual consultant: Nancy Leiviska
- Executive producer: Ray Singleton

== Charts ==
=== Weekly charts ===
Chart (1984)	Peak position
Australia (Kent Music Report)	12
German Albums (Offizielle Top 100)	38
Swedish Albums (Sverigetopplistan)	26
Swiss Albums (Schweizer Hitparade)	20
UK Albums (Official Charts)	52
US Billboard 200	15
US Top R&B/Hip-Hop Albums (Billboard)	5

=== Year-end charts ===
Chart (1984)	Position
US Top R&B/Hip-Hop Albums (Billboard)	23

== Certifications ==
Region	Certification	Certified units/sales
United States (RIAA)	Gold	500,000^{^}
^{^} Shipments figures based on certification alone.
