= Eddie Singleton =

Eddie Singleton (December 1936 - June 2006) was an American recording artist, songwriter, producer, and music executive who founded Keith Records and Shrine Records and later as a major label A&R executive. for producing soul music records on various labels, competing with Motown.

== Life and career ==
Born Edward Singleton in Illinois, he was raised on gospel music. Eddie had a son named Keith, and relocated to New York City where he recorded a single, featuring "God Bless the Child" and "It's Not My Fault" (A-side and B-side) on the independent label, Joker Records (catalog number J-1001).

Singleton established Keith Records around this time, named for his son, and based out of the Brill Building in Manhattan. In September 1961, Keith issued its first pressing, a single by the vocal group Dougie and the Dudes. In 1962 and 1963, Keith issued several recordings of The Matadors and Oberia Martinez, the latter of whom became a cult figure within the northern soul and Belgian popcorn music scenes years later.

By 1963, Motown Records had expanded into the northeast, opened a satellite office for its publishing arm, Jobete Music, hiring Singleton to recruit singers and songwriters, produce demo recordings for Motown, and co-manage the satellite office with Raynoma Gordy. He and Raynoma Gordon, who would marry from 1966 to 1970, parted ways with Motown in 1964 and co-founded Ramitary Music, Red Carpet Management, and Shrine Records, operating out of New York City and Washington, D.C. As a songwriter and producer, Singleton contributed to shaping the distinct mid-Atlantic soul sound that later became highly prized by international record collectors.

In 1974, Singleton launched Americana Records, where he signed Rick James and former Motown vocalist Barbara Randolph.

=== Audio production and major label ===
In the 1980s, he was signed by NTN Buzztime to manage movie soundtrack audio production By 1996, he was the Director of A&R for the Black Music Division at Warner Records. where he also conducted industry education and career workshops on behalf of the Songwriters Guild of America.
