= Keith Records =

Defunct American record label

- Founded: 1961
- Founder: Eddie Singleton
- Distributor: London Records
- Genre: R&B, pop, soul music, northern soul
- Country of origin: United States
- Location: 1650 Broadway, Manhattan, New York City, New York, U.S.

Keith Records was an American rhythm and blues and soul music record label founded by Eddie Singleton and operating out of the Brill Building as of 1961. Keith was the first black-owned label to be distributed via London Records. The label's first single was the A-side and B-side "Fire" and "Settle Down" by Dougie and The Dudes, released in August 1961. The single appeared in Cash Box magazine's "Looking Ahead" listings for five consecutive weeks beginning October 14, 1961.

In 1962 and 1963, The Matadors and Oberia Martinez were gaining local and regional traction. Martinez's arrangement of One For My Baby Raynoma was previously married to Berry Gordy, with whom she had founded Motown. Operations wound down when Singleton was hired to co-manage Jobete Music, the New York publisher of Motown Records, alongside Raynoma Gordy. The following year, the two would leave Jobete andd establish Shrine Records in Washington, D.C.. They were married from 1966 to 1970.
