= Jobete Music =

Music publishing company founded by Berry Gordy

Jobete Music Company, Inc.
- Type: Private
- Industry: Music publishing
- Founded: June 1959; 66 years ago
- Founder: Berry Gordy
- Headquarters: Detroit, Michigan, U.S.
- Key people: Berry Gordy, Raynoma Liles Gordy Singleton
- Parent: Motown Record Corporation (1959–1988)

Jobete Music Company, Inc. (commonly Jobete) is the music publishing division of Motown Records originally established by Motown founder Berry Gordy, and his wife Raynoma Liles Gordy in Detroit, Michigan. As the publishing arm of Motown, Jobete was responsible for the publishing, administration, and licensing (copyright) of the songwriting output created by Motown’s staff of songwriters, composers, and artists. Over the following decades, Jobete grew into one of the most valuable popular music publishing catalogues in the world, controlling the rights to most of Motown’s best-known songs.

== History ==
=== Foundation (1959) ===
Berry Gordy established Jobete Music in 1959 as part of his broader strategy to integrate songwriting, publishing, and recording within his business empire. He incorporated the company in Michigan and moved quickly to register copyrights for songs written by himself and early Motown artists. By the end of the company’s first year, Gordy had applied for copyrights on more than seventy titles. Jobete operated alongside Gordy’s in-house labels, Tamla Records, Motown Records, Gordy Records, Soul Records, and V.I.P. Records. Jobete soon became the primary publisher for the entire Motown catalogue.

=== Growth during the 1960s and 1970s ===
During the 1960s, as Motown rose to national prominence, Jobete expanded rapidly. It became the publishing home for material written by in-house songwriters such as Smokey Robinson, the prolific hit making team of Holland–Dozier–Holland, (Brian Holland, Lamont Dozier, Eddie Holland), Norman Whitfield, and Ashford & Simpson (Nicolas Ashford and Valerie Simpson). Other notable in-house producers and arrangers contributed to the vast Jobete holdings, including Earl Van Dyke, Sylvia Moy, Lionel Richie, Janie Bradford, Paul Riser, and Ron Miller.

Centralizing licensing and administration under Jobete allowed Motown to maximize performance and royalty income, as well as synchronization of music placements in film, television, and advertising.

=== Name and identity ===
The name "Jobete" is derived from a combination of the first two letters from the names of Gordy’s three children by his first wife Thelma Louise Coleman. Their names: Hazel "Joy" Gordy, Berry Gordy III, and Terry Gordy (originally rendered “Jo-Be-Te”). Jobete’s name appeared on countless record labels and copyright registrations during the 1960s and 1970s, often as the sole publisher for Motown releases.

In her autobiography, Raynoma Liles Gordy Singleton, Berry Gordy's second wife, wrote of this: "In January of 1959 I went to the City-County Building in downtown Detroit to pick up registration papers again. Berry and I were now establishing two more partnerships. While we filed legally for Tamla Records, we also registered our publishing company, Jobete Music, named with affection for Berry's three kids - Joy, Berry, and Terry."

From its inception in early 1959, Raynoma Gordy had been placed in the leadership role at Jobete and, along with the assistance of at least two of her personal family members, guided the publishing operation through its earliest formative years. This continued essentially for the next five years, or until Mrs. Gordy ultimately departed Motown in 1964. The top position was then passed to Mr. Gordy's older sister Loucye Gordy-Wakefield, who remained in that role just over a year, or until her untimely death from brain cancer in 1965. At this point, Berry Gordy appointed his younger brother Robert Louis Gordy as Jobete's General Manager and Vice President, remaining as leader of the division for about twenty years, until 1985.

=== Operations and catalogue ===
Jobete’s primary functions included registering copyrights, issuing mechanical and synchronization licenses, collecting royalties from performing-rights organizations, and negotiating placements for Motown songs. Its catalogue includes thousands of titles by artists such as Diana Ross and The Supremes, Stevie Wonder, The Temptations, Marvin Gaye, Smokey Robinson and the Miracles, The Four Tops, and the early recordings of The Jackson 5, featuring Michael Jackson. With this lineup, among many other stellar performers on the Motown roster, Jobete became one of the most significant and lucrative popular music publishing catalogues of the 20th century.

=== Ownership changes ===
From the 1980s onward, Berry Gordy sold portions of his publishing interests. In 1997, EMI Music Publishing acquired controlling interest in the Jobete catalogue in a deal widely reported in the music industry press, reflecting the catalogue’s immense commercial value. Subsequent sales and mergers during the 2000s and 2010s placed Jobete’s repertoire within larger corporate publishing structures.

== Notable songs ==
Jobete’s catalogue encompasses various Motown hit songs (mainly during the company's independent era) including, but not limited to:

- "Money (That's What I Want)" by Barrett Strong (1959)
- “Shop Around” by the Miracles" (1960)
- "Please Mr. Postman" by the Marvelettes (1961)
- "You've Really Got a Hold on Me" by the Miracles (1962)
- "Pride and Joy" by Marvin Gaye (1963)
- “Where Did Our Love Go?” by the Supremes (1964)
- "Baby I Need Your Loving" by the Four Tops (1964)
- "Dancing in the Street" by Martha and the Vandellas (1964)
- "Come See About Me" by the Supremes (1964)
- "Ooo Baby Baby" by the Miracles (1965)
- “My Girl” by the Temptations (1965)
- “I Can't Help Myself (Sugar Pie Honey Bunch)” by the Four Tops (1965)
- “Uptight (Everything's Alright)” by Stevie Wonder (1965)
- "This Old Heart of Mine (Is Weak for You)" by the Isley Brothers (1966)
- "Ain't Too Proud to Beg" by the Temptations (1966)
- "Reach Out I'll Be There by the Four Tops (1966)
- “Ain't No Mountain High Enough” by Marvin Gaye and Tammi Terrell (1967)
- "Ain't Nothing Like the Real Thing" by Marvin Gaye and Tammi Terrell (1968)
- "You're All I Need to Get By" by Marvin Gaye and Tammi Terrell (1968)
- “Cloud Nine” by the Temptations (1968)
- “I Heard It Through the Grapevine” by Marvin Gaye (1968)
- "My Whole World Ended (The Moment You Left Me)" by David Ruffin (1969)
- "I Want You Back" by the Jackson 5 (1969)
- "ABC" by the Jackson 5 (1970)
- "The Love You Save" by the Jackson 5 (1970)
- "Signed, Sealed, Delivered I'm Yours" by Stevie Wonder (1970)
- "I'll Be There" by the Jackson 5 (1970)
- "What's Going On" by Marvin Gaye (1971)
- "Never Can Say Goodbye" by the Jackson 5 (1971)
- "I Just Want to Celebrate" by Rare Earth (1971)
- "Ben" by Michael Jackson (1972)
- "Touch Me in the Morning" by Diana Ross (1973)
- "Dancing Machine" by the Jackson 5 (1974)
- "It's So Hard to Say Goodbye to Yesterday" by G.C. Cameron (1975)
- "Love Hangover" by Diana Ross (1976)
- "I Want You" by Marvin Gaye (1976)
- "Come Live With Me Angel" by Marvin Gaye (1976)
- "Got to Give It Up" by Marvin Gaye (1977)
- "Sir Duke" by Stevie Wonder (1977)
- "Easy" by the Commodores (1977)
- "Three Times a Lady" by the Commodores (1978)
- "Still" by the Commodores (1979)
- "Sail On" by the Commodores (1979)
- "Let's Get Serious" by Jermaine Jackson (1980)
- "Give It to Me Baby" by Rick James (1981)
- "One Day in Your Life" by Michael Jackson (1981)
- "Lady (You Bring Me Up)" by the Commodores (1981)
- "Super Freak" by Rick James (1981)
- "Square Biz by Teena Marie (1981)
- "Ribbon in the Sky" by Stevie Wonder (1982)
- "All This Love" by DeBarge (1982)
- "Time Will Reveal" by DeBarge (1983)
- "Somebody's Watching Me" by Rockwell (1984)
- "Part Time Lover" by Stevie Wonder (1985)
- "Skeletons by Stevie Wonder (1987)
- "You Will Know" by Stevie Wonder (1987)
- "Get It" by Stevie Wonder and Michael Jackson (1988)

A comprehensive list is maintained in publisher and discographic databases.

== Legacy ==
Jobete’s establishment allowed Berry Gordy and Motown to retain ownership of their creative output, generating long-term revenues through licensing and royalties. The catalogue has continued to generate revenue through new media uses, film soundtracks, commercials, and anthologies, and remains central to the legacy of Motown.

== See also ==
- EMI Music Publishing – British music publishing company
- Holland–Dozier–Holland – American songwriting and production team
- Motown – American record label
- Music publishing – Publisher specializing in the distribution of music
- Keith Records and Shrine Records ; Dial Records -- direct competitors

== Bibliography ==
- Singleton, Raynoma (1990), Berry, Me and Motown: The Untold Story, Contemporary Books, ISBN 978-0809243402.
- Gordy, Berry (1994), To Be Loved: The Music, The Magic, The Memories of Motown: An Autobiography, Warner Books.
- Fakir, Duke (2022), I'll Be There: My Life With The Four Tops, Omnibus Press, ISBN 978--1-913172-59-6.
- Christian, Margena A. (2026), It's No Wonder:The Life and Times of Motown's Legendary Songwriter Sylvia Moy, Da Capo Press, ISBN 978-0-306-83363-2.
