= Aaron Rapoport =

American photographer

- Born: Aaron Bradley Rapoport; May 22, 1954 (age 72); San Mateo County, California, USA
- Known for: Photography

Aaron Rapoport (born May 22, 1954) is an American photographer, best known for his photographs of musicians.

== Biography ==
In a career that spans over three decades, Rapoport has photographed in a wide variety of areas including commercial photography. His photography of album/CD covers includes a cover photo for the Supertramp album, Breakfast in America.

Rapoport is based in Los Angeles, California.

== Selected credits ==
=== Album covers ===
Album	Year	Artist or Group	Label
Lucky	1983	Marty Balin	EMI America
Black Rose	1980	Cher	Casablanca
Feels Good To Feel Good	1987	Garry Glenn	Motown
Russell Hitchcock	1988	Russell Hitchcock	Artista
Love in the Fire	1984	Bobby King	Motown
Personal Attention	1988	Stacy Lattisaw	Motown
Plan B	2001	Huey Lewis and the News	Silvertone
Dancing on the Ceiling	1986	Lionel Richie	Motown
Captured	1985	Rockwell	Motown
Breakfast in America	1979	Supertramp	A&M
To Be Continued...	1986	The Temptations	Gordy
Tiggi Clay	1984	Tiggi Clay	Morocco
