= Somebody's Watching Me =

1983 single by Rockwell

- French 12-inch single

Single by Rockwell

from the album Somebody's Watching Me
- B-side: "Somebody's Watching Me" (instrumental)
- Released: December 27, 1983
- Recorded: 1983
- Studio: Mars Recording Studios (Los Angeles, California)
- Genre: Synth-funk; synth-pop; new wave; R&B
- Length: 4:59 (album/12-inch single version); 3:57 (single version); 3:36 (video version)
- Label: Motown; MCA
- Songwriter: Rockwell
- Producers: Curtis Anthony Nolen; Rockwell

Rockwell singles chronology
"Somebody's Watching Me" (1983)	"Obscene Phone Caller" (1984)

Alternative release(s)
- Side-A label of the US 12-inch vinyl single

Music video
- "Somebody's Watching Me" on YouTube

"Somebody's Watching Me" is the debut single written, co-produced, and performed by American singer Rockwell, released by Motown and distributed by MCA Records in December 1983. Serving as the lead single from Rockwell's debut studio album of the same name (1984), it features uncredited guest vocals by Michael Jackson, additional backing vocals by Jermaine Jackson, and co-production from Curtis Anthony Nolan.

The song became a major commercial success internationally, topping the charts in Belgium, France, and Spain, and reaching the top 5 in Canada, West Germany, the Netherlands, New Zealand, South Africa, Sweden, Switzerland, and the United States. In the UK, it reached No. 6 and is Rockwell's only top 40 hit on the UK Singles Chart. Rolling Stone magazine called the song "an international and enduring smash hit that, more than 40 years later, remains the perennial paranoia-rock anthem and Halloween mix go-to song."

== Background and composition ==
Rockwell is the son of Motown CEO Berry Gordy. At the time of the recording, Rockwell was estranged from his father and living with Ray Singleton, his father's ex-wife and the mother of his older half-brother, Kerry Gordy. Singleton served as executive producer on the project and would occasionally play demo tracks to Berry Gordy, who was less than enthusiastic about Rockwell's music until he heard the single with Michael Jackson's familiar voice featuring prominently on background vocals.

The song is in the key of C♯ minor, with 4/4 time, and vocals spanning from C♯_{4} to C♯_{5}.

Produced by Curtis Anthony Nolen, the song features backing vocals by Michael, Randy and Jermaine Jackson, with Alan Murray on percussion.

== Music video ==
The music video depicts Rockwell at his home taking a shower and having illusions of his every move being surreptitiously recorded by a video camera. Other scenes in the video include Rockwell in a cemetery, the tap water in the shower stall spraying blood, and him having his mail delivered by a mailman who appears to be alive, but is, in fact, undead. The video ends with the mailman handing Rockwell a package, but whether this is a moment of danger or just an unsettling interaction remains ambiguous.

The mailman has a cameo in Rockwell's next video, for "Obscene Phone Caller".

== Charts ==
=== Weekly charts ===
Chart (1984)	Peak position
Australia (Kent Music Report)	12
Austria (Ö3 Austria Top 40)	14
Belgium (Ultratop 50 Flanders)	1
Brazil (ABPD)	2
Canada Top Singles (RPM)	2
Finland (Suomen virallinen lista)	14
France (IFOP)	1
Ireland (IRMA)	6
Italy (Musica e dischi)	14
Netherlands (Dutch Top 40)	2
Netherlands (Single Top 100)	4
New Zealand (Recorded Music NZ)	5
Norway (VG-lista)	7
Peru (UPI)	4
South Africa (Springbok Radio)	5
Spain (AFYVE)	1
Sweden (Sverigetopplistan)	4
Switzerland (Schweizer Hitparade)	3
UK Singles (Official Charts)	6
US Billboard Hot 100	2
US Hot Black Singles (Billboard)	1
US Dance/Disco Top 80 (Billboard)	3
US Rock Top Tracks (Billboard)	31
US Cash Box Top 100	2
West Germany (GfK)	2
Zimbabwe (ZIMA)	1

Chart (2021)	Peak position
Canada Hot 100 (Billboard)	39
Global 200 (Billboard)	35

Chart (2023)	Peak position
Ireland (IRMA/OCC)	49

Chart (2025–2026)	Peak position
Canada Hot 100 (Billboard)	16
Global 200 (Billboard)	17
Ireland (IRMA/OCC)	24

=== Year-end charts ===
Chart (1984)	Position
Belgium (Ultratop 50 Flanders)	13
Canada Top Singles (RPM)	28
France (IFOP)	47
Netherlands (Dutch Top 40)	16
Netherlands (Single Top 100)	46
US Billboard Hot 100	26
US Hot Black Singles (Billboard)	12
US Cash Box Top 100	21
West Germany (Media Control)	46

== Certifications ==
Region	Certification	Certified units/sales
Canada (Music Canada)	Gold	50,000^{^}
Denmark (IFPI Danmark)	Gold	45,000^{‡}
New Zealand (RMNZ)	Gold	15,000^{‡}
United Kingdom (BPI) Sales since 2004	Platinum	600,000^{‡}
United States (RIAA)	Gold	1,000,000^{^}
United States (RIAA) Digital	Gold	500,000^{*}
^{*} Sales figures based on certification alone.^{^} Shipments figures based on certification alone.^{‡} Sales+streaming figures based on certification alone.

== Beatfreakz version ==
"Somebody's Watching Me"

Single by Beatfreakz
- Released: May 1, 2006
- Genre: House
- Length: 2:58
- Label: Spinnin'
- Songwriter: Kennedy "Rockwell" Gordy
- Producer: Beatfreakz

Beatfreakz singles chronology
"Somebody's Watching Me" (2006)	"Superfreak" (2006)

Music video
- "Somebody's Watching Me" on YouTube

In 2006, Dutch dance music group Beatfreakz recorded a pseudo-cover of the song that samples the chorus but omitted the verses. This version was a top-10 hit in Belgium, Finland, Ireland, New Zealand, and the United Kingdom.

=== Track listing ===
Dutch CD single

1. "Somebody's Watching Me" (Hi_Tack radio edit)
2. "Somebody's Watching Me" (Hi_Tack remix)
3. "Somebody's Watching Me" (Dennis Christopher remix)
4. "Somebody's Watching Me" (E-Craigs 2006 mix)
5. "Somebody's Watching Me" (BeatFreakz Clubmix)
6. "Somebody's Watching Me" (Ian Carey club mix)

=== Charts ===
==== Weekly charts ====
Chart (2006)	Peak position
Australia (ARIA)	38
Belgium (Ultratop 50 Flanders)	28
Belgium (Ultratip Bubbling Under Wallonia)	4
CIS Airplay (TopHit)	3
Czech Republic Airplay (ČNS IFPI)	14
Europe (Eurochart Hot 100)	11
France (SNEP)	18
Finland (Suomen virallinen lista)	7
Germany (GfK)	41
Hungary (Dance Top 40)	10
Hungary (Editors' Choice Top 40)	33
Ireland (IRMA)	5
Netherlands (Dutch Top 40)	12
Netherlands (Single Top 100)	21
New Zealand (Recorded Music NZ)	7
Romania (Romanian Top 100)	28
Russia Airplay (TopHit)	3
Scottish Singles Sales (Official Charts)	3
Switzerland (Schweizer Hitparade)	65
Ukraine Airplay (TopHit)	53
UK Singles (Official Charts)	3
UK Dance (Official Charts)	1

Chart (2023)	Peak position
Poland (Polish Airplay Top 100)	66

==== Year-end charts ====
Chart (2006)	Position
CIS Airplay (TopHit)	40
Netherlands (Dutch Top 40)	94
UK Singles (OCC)	42
Russia Airplay (TopHit)	36

=== Certifications ===
Region	Certification	Certified units/sales
United Kingdom (BPI)	Silver	200,000^{‡}
^{‡} Sales+streaming figures based on certification alone.

=== Release history ===
Region	Date	Format(s)	Label(s)	Ref.
United Kingdom	May 1, 2006	CD	Data	
Australia	June 26, 2006	CD	Ministry of Sound	

== See also ==
- List of number-one R&B singles of 1984 (U.S.)
- Billboard Year-End Hot 100 singles of 1984
- List of number-one singles of 1984 (France)
- List of number-one singles of 1984 (Spain)
