= Kerry Gordy =

American music executive (born 1959)

Kerry Ashby Gordy
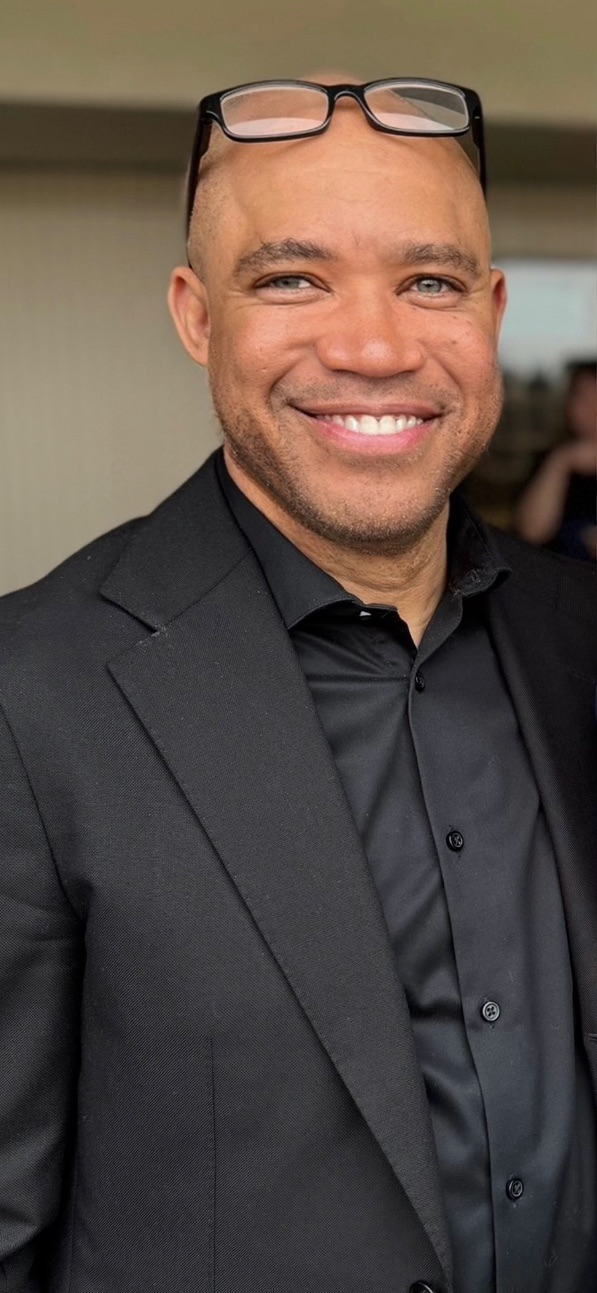
- Kerry Gordy

Background information
- Born: June 25, 1959 (age 67); Detroit, Michigan, U.S.
- Origin: Detroit, Michigan
- Genres: R&B; soul; pop
- Occupations: Intellectual Property Manager & Executive Producer Film and TV, Career Music Executive
- Instruments: Piano; keyboard
- Years active: 1973–present
- Label: Motown, Warner Brothers, and Paisley Park

Kerry Ashby Gordy (born June 25, 1959) is a career music executive and fourth eldest child of the founder of Motown Records, Berry Gordy. Gordy is the chief executive officer of Kerry Gordy & Associates, Inc. LLC, KGIP Inc., and NuVintage, LLC., intellectual property and branding companies focused on entertainment.

== Early years ==
Gordy was born in Detroit, Michigan, to multi-instrumentalist, Motown songwriter and arranger, Raynoma Mayberry and Berry Gordy. He was born the same year that his father founded Motown Records on West Grand Boulevard which housed the Hitsville U.S.A./Motown recording studios.

Gordy's mother was a child prodigy in music and played eleven instruments. She orchestrated the early arrangements for Motown. Gordy lived with his mother until the age of 13, at which point he began to live full-time with his father.

In 1972, Gordy moved to Los Angeles, California. with his father and became one of his protégés, along with best friend and business partner, Benny Medina.

Gordy and Benny Medina met during their time at Beverly Hills High School, during which time, Medina came to live at the Gordy estate. Together, they wrote arranged and produced records for Motown and also founded the teen band, Apollo. Teena Marie was an original member of the band as the groups female lead. Teena later dropped out of the band before the release of their first single, "Astro Disco" in 1979.

In the early 80s Gordy acted in various commercials, T.V. shows and movies under the name Kerry Ashby, and in 1990, participated as a judge in the Miss USA Pageant.

== Early professional career ==
Gordy's career began in 1973 working in the Motown Records mailroom. The early years of his career were spent in various administrative and creative capacities. In order for Gordy to separate himself at Motown from his father Berry, he dropped his surname and began using the name Kerry Ashby professionally.

In 1984, as an A&R representative for Motown, Gordy was instrumental in signing Rockwell's "Somebody's Watching Me", which became a hit for Motown and Gordy's first hit. He was then promoted to the position of Director of A&R, where he worked on projects with Gold and Platinum artists such as The Temptations, the Four Tops, Rick James and Billy Preston. He also worked on compilation albums for Diana Ross and Michael Jackson. He became a senior executive for The Gordy Company (his father's company after selling Motown in 1988) where he was responsible for supervising business affairs, A&R, product development, administration and personnel.

Between 1991 and 1993 Gordy consulted Al Bell's independently distributed label, Bellmark Records. This union culminated with $26 million in sales and yielded the year's biggest international hit, "Whoomp! (There It Is)" by the group Tag Team.

In 1993, Gordy became the vice president of two divisions for Paisley Park Records, A&R and artist development, (a joint venture between Time-Warner and Prince). That same year, Gordy produced and co-wrote George Clinton's comeback hit "Paint the White House Black" collaborating with artists Ice Cube, Dr. Dre, Public Enemy, and the Red Hot Chili Peppers. The following year, he orchestrated a joint venture between Prince's N.P.G. label and Bellmark Records. This union yielded the hit "The Most Beautiful Girl In The World".

Gordy served as vice president of A&R for Warner Bros. Records Black Music Division, where in 1995 the R.I.A.A. (Recording Industry Association of America) awarded him with gold records on Zapp and Roger's All the Greatest Hits and Prince's Come Album. His production of Belize's "I’m Looking Out For You" was the theme song for Real Stories of the Highway Patrol. Gordy also managed Rick James, who sold in excess of $25 million records and grossed over $40 million in concert revenue, from 1996 until his death in 2004.

== Entertainment consulting, IP and other ventures ==
In 1997, Gordy negotiated and obtained a three-act production deal with Interscope Records joint venture partner B-Rite Records. The first release from that venture (Gospel Gangstaz) enjoyed success, reaching number three on Billboards Gospel album chart and was also nominated for a Grammy Award. Between 1998 and 2001 Gordy was awarded Gold, Platinum, Double Platinum, and Triple Platinum sales awards by the R.I.A.A. in commemoration of licensing Rick James', controlled compositions, Salt n Pepa's Brand New Project, Erykah Badu's Live Project and Mary J. Blige's Share my World and My Life projects respectively. He has over 20 Gold and Platinum records and 1 Diamond record.

In 1998, Gordy partnered with Gordon Bizar under the name Gordy-Bizar to securitize artists' and publishers' royalties. Financing deals were signed with Alice Walton's investment banking firm Llama Company as well as Lehman Brothers.

In 2003, Gordy signed a deal with Clear Channel Entertainment to produce his company's first theatrical venture, “Hear No Evil.” He also signed a worldwide deal with the William Morris Agency to be represented in that arena.

In 2004, Gordy co-founded Siebers Style with Debbie Siebers who earlier that year struck a deal with BEACHBODY to sell the “Debbie Siebers Slim in 6” rapid weight loss program which grossed an excess of $250 million for Beach Body. Siebers later became the fitness expert on the reality show The Swan on Fox TV. Gordy negotiated two book deals for Siebers with Silverback Publishing entitled Energy Boost and Nutritional Makeover.

In 2007, Gordy founded Kerry Gordy Enterprises, LLC., an intellectual property and branding company focused on entertainment. He also closed a seven-figure publishing deal for his long-time client, partner, and friend, Bruce Fisher (Writer of several number one hits including the standard "You Are So Beautiful") with Evergreen Publishing.

In recent years, Gordy has entered into a deal to produce The Last Dragon for Sony Pictures with John Davis, who has produced over 90 feature films that have earned over $4.8 Billion at the box office worldwide to date. He also entered into a partnership with entertainment mogul Ted Field and Radar Pictures in an intellectual property joint venture.

Gordy partnered with Stevie Wonder and the Duke Ellington School, in Washington, DC to raise $1 Million to help fund school programs, and support growing budget costs. Because of Gordy's efforts, other celebrity musicians, including Sting, Paul Simon and Aretha Franklin, Smokey Robinson and Patti LaBelle, lent their talents to help raise over $100 million for the institution. Their efforts allowed the Duke Ellington school to build a new state of the art campus.

Through his work in Copyright Recapture, as CEO of Kerry Gordy & Associates, Inc., Gordy has become known as "Robin Hood". Working with artists like Smokey Robinson, Valerie Simpson, The Rick James Estate, Writer/Producer Teddy Riley; whose productions include Michael Jackson and Lady Gaga, Gordy has been responsible for over $80 million in royalty payout increases and intellectual property branding deals. Some of his most successfully monetized songs include, "I Heard It Through the Grapevine", "Please Mr. Postman", "Just My Imagination", "Shop round", "Ain't Too Proud to Beg", "Tracks of My Tears", "I'm Every Woman", "Ain't No Mountain High Enough", "War", "Super Freak", "You Are So Beautiful" and "Somebody's Watching Me".

Represented by Geneva Bray of GVA Talent Agency, Gordy has been a guest speaker for UCLA, USC, Duke University, and a keynote speaker at the Harvard Business School. Through a partnership with Yellow Brick Music, Co., Gordy has teamed up with the Clive Davis Institute of Recorded Music at NYU to provide 100 scholarships for underprivileged students. Gordy serves as an contributor to news organizations such as CNN and has appeared as himself on the TV series, Little Women LA as well as Inside Edition and Access Hollywood as a music industry expert. He has also been featured in Forbes Magazine, where he shares his unique and insightful perspective on brand marketing.

Gordy was featured in Steven Samblis' self-help book, 100 Habits from the worlds Happiest Achievers, where he discusses his personal philosophies on life business and personal achievement and satisfaction.

Gordy’s work has earned formal recognition from leaders across California and Nevada. He has received Certificates of Recognition from U.S. Representatives Maxine Waters (California’s 43rd Congressional District), Adam B. Schiff (California), Jimmy Gomez (California’s 34th Congressional District), and Steven Horsford (Nevada's 4th Congressional District). The Beverly Hills City Council — including mayor Sharona R. Nazarian, PsyD; vice mayor John A. Mirisch; and councilmembers Lester J. Friedman and Mary N. Wells — formally recognized him for his leadership and professional achievements. He was also honored by the mayor of Los Angeles, Karen Bass, for his contributions to artists, Black culture, and youth mentorship.

== Family ==
The fourth eldest child of Berry Gordy, Gordy's paternal half-siblings are:

- Hazel Joy Gordy
- Berry Gordy IV
- Terry James Gordy
- Sherry Gordy
- Kennedy William Gordy (known as Rockwell)
- Rhonda Suzanne Gordy-Silberstein
- Stefan Kendal Gordy (Redfoo of LMFAO)

Gordy has one daughter, Juliet.

== Sources ==
- Kerry Gordy Produces George Clinton's Comeback Hit, "Paint the White House Black" on the "Smell My Finger" Album
- Paisley Park Recruits Kerry Gordy to Oversee its Roster
- George Clinton Music Video "Paint the White House Black", Produced by Kerry Gordy Starring Ice Cube, Dr. Dre, Red Hot Chili Peppers, Yo Yo, MC Breed and Kam Among Others Video on YouTube
- Kerry Gordy Signs Indian "King of Pop", Reggie Benjamin
- Chemical Engineer Turned Indian Pop Star, Reggie Benjamin Signs with Kerry Gordy Enterprises
- Manager Kerry Gordy Talks About Rick James Album Plans in 2000
- Rick James' Long Time Manager, Kerry Gordy, Talks About the Super Freak After His Death
- Top Warner Bros. Records Executives in 1995
- Kerry Gordy Writes Two Songs for The Temptations "Reunion" Album that Reaches #2 on Billboards R&B Album Chart
- Four Tops "Magic" Album Produced by Kerry Ashby and Benny Medina
- Kerry Gordy Produces Hit TV Show Theme "Real Stories of the Highway Patrol"
- Kerry Gordy, Leader and Founder of Teen Idol Group "Apollo"
- Kerry Gordy and Benny Medina, Teen Idol Group "Apollo", National Television Debut on the Dinah Shore Show in 1978 (Video) Video on YouTube
- Kerry Ashby on NBC's Diff'rent Strokes
- Kerry Gordy Articles of Congress
