= List of number-one singles of 1984 (France) =

This is a list of the French Singles & Airplay Chart Reviews/SNEP Top 50 Singles number-ones of 1984.

== Summary ==
=== Singles chart ===
Week	Issue Date	Artist	Single
1	8 January	Irene Cara	"Flashdance... What a Feeling"
2	15 January	Irene Cara	"Flashdance... What a Feeling"
3	22 January	Irene Cara	"Flashdance... What a Feeling"
4	29 January	Irene Cara	"Flashdance... What a Feeling"
5	5 February	Michael Jackson	"Thriller"
6	12 February	Michael Jackson	"Thriller"
7	19 February	Michael Jackson	"Thriller"
8	26 February	Michael Jackson	"Thriller"
9	4 March	Break Machine	"Street Dance"
10	11 March	Break Machine	"Street Dance"
11	18 March	Break Machine	"Street Dance"
12	25 March	Break Machine	"Street Dance"
13	1 April	Frankie Goes to Hollywood	"Relax"
14	8 April	Frankie Goes to Hollywood	"Relax"
15	15 April	Frankie Goes to Hollywood	"Relax"
16	22 April	Frankie Goes to Hollywood	"Relax"
17	29 April	Frankie Goes to Hollywood	"Relax"
18	6 May	Frankie Goes to Hollywood	"Relax"
19	13 May	Frankie Goes to Hollywood	"Relax"
20	20 May	Frankie Goes to Hollywood	"Relax"
21	27 May	Frankie Goes to Hollywood	"Relax"
22	3 June	Rockwell	"Somebody's Watching Me"
23	10 June	Rockwell	"Somebody's Watching Me"
24	17 June	Rockwell	"Somebody's Watching Me"
25	24 June	Rockwell	"Somebody's Watching Me"
26	1 July	Rockwell	"Somebody's Watching Me"
27	8 July	Rockwell	"Somebody's Watching Me"
28	15 July	Rockwell	"Somebody's Watching Me"
29	22 July	Rockwell	"Somebody's Watching Me"
30	29 July	Michel Sardou	"Les Deux Écoles"
31	5 August	The Art Company	"Susanna"
32	12 August	Michel Sardou	"Les Deux Écoles"
33	19 August	Jeanne Mas	"Toute première fois"
34	26 August	Laura Branigan	"Self Control"
35	2 September	Scorpions	"Still Loving You"
36	9 September	Scorpions	"Still Loving You"
37	16 September	Cookie Dingler	"Femme libérée"
38	23 September	Scorpions	"Still Loving You"
39	30 September	Cookie Dingler	"Femme libérée"
40	7 October	France Gall	"Hong-Kong Star"
41	14 October	Mike Oldfield	"To France"
42	21 October	Cookie Dingler	"Femme libérée"
43	28 October	Chris de Burgh	"High On Emotion"
SNEP number-one singles
Week	Issue Date	Artist	Single
1	4 November	Peter and Sloane	"Besoin de rien, envie de toi"
2	11 November	Peter and Sloane	"Besoin de rien, envie de toi"
3	18 November	Peter and Sloane	"Besoin de rien, envie de toi"
4	25 November	Peter and Sloane	"Besoin de rien, envie de toi"
5	2 December	Peter and Sloane	"Besoin de rien, envie de toi"
6	9 December	Peter and Sloane	"Besoin de rien, envie de toi"
7	16 December	Peter and Sloane	"Besoin de rien, envie de toi"
8	23 December	Stevie Wonder	"I Just Called to Say I Love You"
9	30 December	Ray Parker Jr	"Ghostbusters"

^1 In November 1984, IFOP affiliated MEDEF and established The Official French Singles Chart under the Syndicat National de l'Édition Phonographique (SNEP). The first official chart was on the issue week of November 4, 1984. There was no official chart before this date, but reviews from IFOP since the music industry was created in France in 1922.

== See also ==
- 1984 in music
- List of number-one hits (France)
- List of artists who reached number one on the French Singles Chart
