= Apollo (band) =

American R&B/disco group

- Origin: Los Angeles, California, U.S.
- Genres: R&B, soul, disco
- Years active: 1970s
- Label: Gordy
- Spinoffs: The Mooseheart Faith Stellar Groove Band
- Past members: Kerry Gordy; Benny Medina; Cliff Liles; Lenny Greene; Larry Robinson

Apollo was an American R&B/disco group that recorded for Motown in the late 1970s. They are best known as the band of future music executives Benny Medina and Kerry Gordy.

== History ==
Originally the band was called Kryptonite after the green substance that weakened Superman. The group's moniker was changed to Apollo after the creators of the superhero refused to let the band use the name they created. As a result, the name of their first single was changed from "Krypto Disco" to "Astro Disco."

The band consisted of keyboardist Kerry Gordy, drummer Lenny Greene (who replaced original drummer Chico Ross, brother of Diana Ross), bassist Cliff Liles, vocalist Benny Medina and guitarist Larry Robinson. Liles and Gordy were the sons of Ray Singleton, who produced their self-titled debut album for Gordy Records. The latter son is Singleton's child through her relationship with Berry Gordy, the former is the ex-stepson of Berry Gordy.

Initially, the band showed promise, appearing on Soul Train and other dance shows. They also had a successful two-week tour in Japan, but Motown's interest in the band waned and pulled the plug before they could start on a second album.

Cliff Liles did re-emerge a few years later as a member of the rock band Kagny and the Dirty Rats, which recorded a self-titled album on the Motown label. The latter was produced by former bandmates Benny Medina and Kerry Gordy (now known as Kerry Ashby).

Larry Robinson also collaborated with Todd Homer of the Los Angeles punk band The Angry Samoans, his former classmate at Beverly Hills High School, to form the psychedelic band The Mooseheart Faith Stellar Groove Band that released several CDs on September Gurls Records in Germany.

== See also ==
- Gordy family
