= Shrine Records =

- Founded: 1964
- Founder: Eddie Singleton; Raynoma Gordy Singleton
- Defunct: 1967-1968
- Status: Inactive
- Country of origin: United States
- Location: Washington, D.C.

Shrine Records was an American soul and R&B record label based in Washington, D.C.. Co-founded by Eddie Singleton (following the collapse of his previous label, Keith Records) and Raynoma Gordy Singleton, who were married from 1966-1970. Raynoma was previously married to Berry Gordy, with whom she had founded Motown. Its headquarters was a townhouse located at 3 Thomas Circle NW within Washington, D.C.

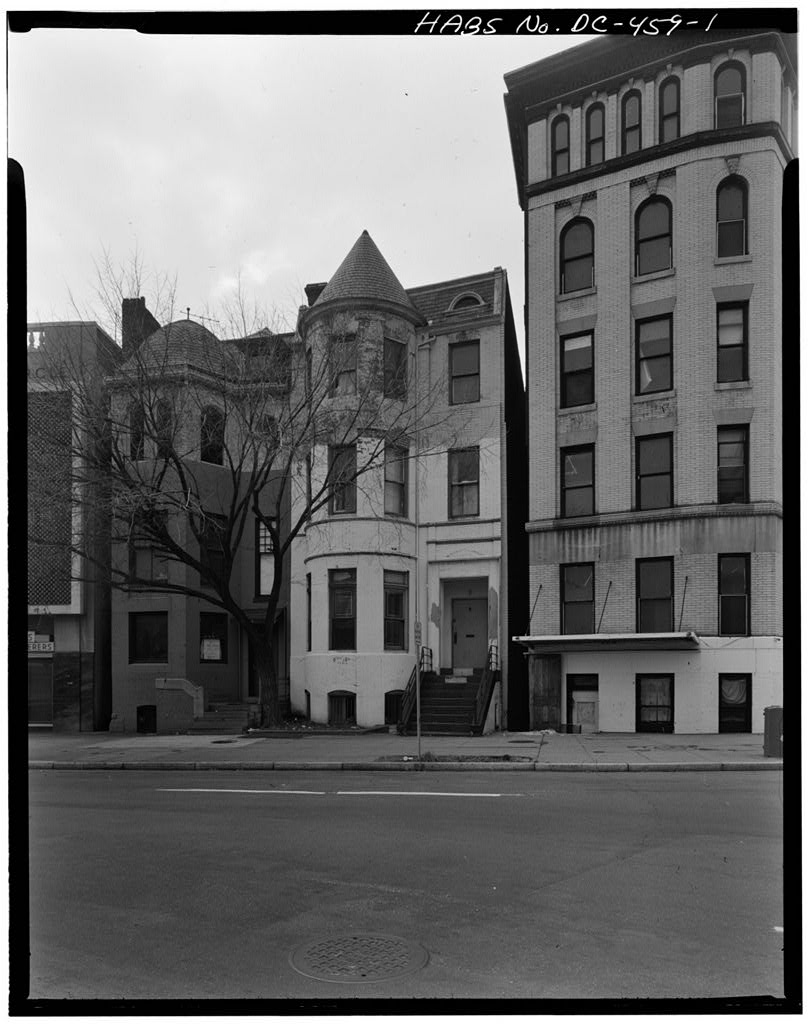
3 Thomas Circle NW, the headquarters of Shrine Records, pictured in 1954

From 1964 to 1967, Shrine released a total of twenty vinyl 45 singles comprising forty different tracks. However, none of the Shrine singles were significant hits, and the label ceased operations in 1967. Shrine's stock of unsold records was destroyed in a warehouse fire in the 1968 King assassination riots. As a result, very few Shrine records remain today and are highly sought after by collectors.

In addition to the released material, a small catalog of tracks from various artists was recorded by Shrine but never issued, though much of this previously unreleased material has been rediscovered and released on various newer labels such as Horace's Records, Kent Records, and Ace Records.

Notable artists involved with Shrine included Ray Pollard (who later released material on Decca), Linda Tate, Frances Nero, Eddie Daye & the Four Bars, and the Cavaliers.

The Shrine Records logo was a line drawing of an eternal flame.

== Reissues ==
UK label Horace's Records has issued two vinyl LPs of Shrine material: 1990's Shrine: The Rarest Soul Label (cat# HRH 101) followed by Shrine: The Rarest Soul Label, Volume 2 (cat# HRH 102). The label has also released various split-artist vinyl 45s of originally released Shrine material.

UK label Kent Records has issued two CD releases of both originally released and previously unreleased Shrine material: 1998's Shrine: The Rarest Soul Label (cat# CDKEND 160) followed by 2002's Shrine: The Rarest Soul Label Vol 2 (cat# CDKEND 190).

Additionally, UK label Goldmine (Soul Supply) Ltd has issued the following five vinyl 45 singles of Shrine material:

- The Cairos: "Stop Overlooking Me" / "Don't Fight It" (cat# SRG 101)
- Eddie Daye & The Four Bars: "Guess Who Loves You" / "What Am I Gonna Do" (cat# SRG 102)
- Les Chasonettes: "Don't Let Him Hurt You" / "Deeper" (cat# SRG 105)
- DC Blossoms: "Hey Boy" / "I Know About Her" (cat# SRG 108)
- Bobby Reed: "Caldonia Brown" / "Baby Don't Leave Me" (previously unreleased track) (cat# SRG 114)
