= Obscene Phone Caller =

1984 single by Rockwell

Single by Rockwell

from the album Somebody's Watching Me
- B-side: "Obscene Phone Caller (Instrumental)"
- Released: April 1984
- Studio: Mars Recording Studios (Los Angeles, California)
- Genre: Synth-funk, post-disco
- Length: 3:26 (album/single version); 4:28 (12" single version)
- Label: Motown
- Songwriter: Kennedy "Rockwell" Gordy
- Producers: Curtis Anthony Nolen; Rockwell

Rockwell singles chronology
"Somebody's Watching Me" (1984)	"Obscene Phone Caller" (1984)	"Taxman" (1984)

Music video
- "Obscene Phone Caller" on YouTube

"Obscene Phone Caller" is a song recorded by American singer Rockwell, released by the Motown label in 1984, as the second single from his debut studio album Somebody's Watching Me.

The song was less successful than his previous single, peaking at No. 35 on the Billboard Hot 100, becoming Rockwell's final Top 40 hit. However, it was a Top 10 on the Hot Black Singles chart, peaking at No. 9.

== Reception ==
Rolling Stone wrote that "Obscene Phone Caller" "plays into the same paranoia as 'Somebody's Watching Me,' yet nods more to upbeat pop than Rockwell’s more sinister-sounding breakthrough hit." According to Jet magazine, the song was banned from British airwaves because of its lyrics: "Despite Rockwell's popularity in Britain, radio stations there refuse to play "Obscene Phone Caller", the singer's latest hit, until the dirty lyrics of the song are cleaned up."

Cashbox said, "With this second single from the Somebody's Watching Me LP, Rockwell is sure to score another outstanding chart hit. With "Obscene Phone Caller", Rockwell has managed to produce a follow-up single that outdoes its predecessor in dance appeal. This is a song that listeners will be humming in the summer of '84, a song with hooks so sharp that no one can easily avoid them. The back-up harmonies are smooth, with a sophisticated lead vocal delivering the paranoid lines — timely lyrics, in the year of Big Brother, for which Rockwell has become well-known."

Los Angeles Times critic Dennis Hunt considered it one of the two best songs on Somebody's Watching Me, describing it as "delightfully kinky." The Times of Northwest Indiana critic Tim Ellison described it as having a "techno-pop feel" and rated it the best song on side one of the album. Billboard Magazine declared that despite the fact that "Obscene Phone Caller" does not have Michael Jackson on backing vocals like "Somebody's Watching Me" did, its "mannered speech, bouncy beat and paranoid obsession" make it comparable to its predecessor. Upon its release, Billboard regarded it as one of the new releases with the greatest potential on the Billboard Hot Black Singles chart.

The Courier-News critic Marc Hawthorne considered the Jacksons' single "Torture", released later in 1984, to be similar to "Obscene Phone Caller".

== Music video ==
The music video for "Obscene Phone Caller" was directed by Bill Parker. In the video, Rockwell becomes paranoid as a result of the obscene phone calls he receives. The video includes a scene of Rockwell entering the Ambassador Hotel among a crowd of people. The crowd was attracted to the hotel by a local radio announcement that a rock video was being shot at the hotel. Lynda Kolb assessed the video as being "interesting, with a touch of humor," stating that it "supports the song better than most" music videos. The mailman that has a cameo appeared earlier in Rockwell's debut video Somebody's Watching Me.

== Chart performance ==
Chart (1984)	Peak position
Germany (Official German Charts)	53
UK Singles (OCC)	79
US Billboard Hot 100	35
US Cashbox Top 100	30
US Billboard Hot Black Singles	9
