= Taxman =

1966 song by The Beatles

- Cover of the Northern Songs sheet music (licensed to Sonora Musikförlag)

Song by the Beatles

from the album Revolver
- Released: 5 August 1966
- Recorded: 21–22 April, 16 May and 21 June 1966
- Studio: EMI, London
- Genre: Soul; garage rock; garage psychedelia; hard rock
- Length: 2:39
- Label: Parlophone (UK), Capitol (US)
- Songwriter: George Harrison
- Producer: George Martin

Audio sample
- file; help

"Taxman" is a song by the English rock band the Beatles from their 1966 album Revolver. Written by the group's lead guitarist, George Harrison, with some lyrical assistance from John Lennon, it protests against the higher level of progressive tax imposed in the United Kingdom by the Labour government of Harold Wilson, which saw the Beatles paying over 90 per cent of their earnings to the Treasury. The song was selected as the album's opening track and contributed to Harrison's emergence as a songwriter beside the dominant Lennon–McCartney partnership. It was the group's first topical song and the first political statement they had made in their music.

The Beatles began recording "Taxman" in April 1966, a month after Wilson's landslide win in the 1966 general election. Coinciding with the song's creation, Harrison learned that the band members' tax obligations were likely to lead to their bankruptcy, and he was outspoken in his opposition to the government using their income to help fund the manufacture of military weapons. Drawing on 1960s soul/R&B musical influences, the song portrays the taxman as relentless in his pursuit of revenue and name-checks Wilson and Edward Heath, the leader of the Conservative Party. The recording includes an Indian-influenced guitar solo performed by Paul McCartney.

"Taxman" was influential in the development of British psychedelia and mod-style pop, and has been recognised as a precursor to punk rock. The Jam borrowed heavily from the song for their 1980 hit single "Start!" When performing "Taxman" on tour in the early 1990s, Harrison adapted the lyrics to reference contemporaneous leaders, citing its enduring quality beyond the 1960s. The song's impact has extended to the tax industry and into political discourse on taxation.

== Background and inspiration ==
George Harrison wrote "Taxman" at a time when the Beatles discovered they were in a financially precarious position. In April 1966, a report from the London accountancy firm Bryce, Hammer, Isherwood & Co. advised them that despite the group's immense success, "Two of you are close to being bankrupt, and the other two could soon be." In his 1980 autobiography, I, Me, Mine, Harrison says: "'Taxman' was when I first realised that even though we had started earning money, we were actually giving most of it away in taxes; it was and still is typical." As their earnings placed them in the top tax bracket in the United Kingdom, the Beatles were liable to a 95 per cent supertax introduced by Harold Wilson's Labour government; hence the lyric "There's one for you, nineteen for me".

John Lennon helped Harrison complete the song's lyrics. Lennon recalled in 1980: "I threw in a few one-liners to help the song along, because that's what he asked for. He came to me because he couldn't go to Paul [McCartney], because Paul wouldn't have helped him at that period." Lennon said he was reluctant to agree to Harrison's request, since it was "enough to do my own and Paul's [songs]", but he did so "because I loved him and didn't want to hurt his feelings". (Note: Author Alan Clayson writes that despite Lennon's stated reluctance, he acknowledged Harrison's role in helping him and McCartney complete "Eleanor Rigby". Harrison later recalled helping Lennon "weld" together the separate musical segments that became "She Said She Said".)

Aside from the financial imposition, "Taxman" was informed by Harrison's consternation that the vast sums the Beatles paid in tax were being used to fund the manufacture of military weapons. Harrison voiced this concern in his "How a Beatle Lives" interview with Maureen Cleave of the Evening Standard, in late February, in addition to railing against all forms of authority and speaking out against the Vietnam War. He likened Wilson to the Robin Hood character the Sheriff of Nottingham. (Note: Harrison was also highly outspoken about taxation when the Beatles were interviewed on Radio Caroline in late March, shortly before the photo session that produced the banned Yesterday and Today "butcher" cover. While Lennon and McCartney joked about the issue, Harrison complained that the government would never reduce taxes because they needed the revenue for "buying all that crap like F-111s".)

The song includes references to "Mr Wilson" and "Mr Heath", the latter being Ted Heath, the leader of the Conservative Party. In June 1965, during his first term as prime minister, Wilson had nominated the four Beatles as Members of the Order of the British Empire (MBEs). An unprecedented award for pop musicians, the MBEs recognised the group's sizeable contribution to the national economy, as their international breakthrough in 1964 created an export market for British pop for the first time. The band's international success also benefited the country's tourism and fashion industries, and entertainment generally; the surge in exports revenue extended to film and other commercial artistic pursuits, and by early 1966, recognition of London as the "Swinging City" of international culture. According to author Ian MacDonald in his discussion of "Taxman", the substantial tax the Beatles paid to Britain's Treasury was the "price" they paid for their MBEs. (Note: MacDonald also comments that Wilson's landslide win in the March 1966 general election concerned many individuals in pop music, "even stars with social scruples, anxious not to lose out financially while they were at their peak". At this time, in "Sunny Afternoon", Ray Davies of the Kinks similarly complained that "The taxman's taken all my dough" and begged to be "saved" from Wilson's credit squeeze.)

== Recording ==
The Beatles had hoped to record their Revolver album in a more modern facility than EMI's London studios at Abbey Road and were especially impressed with the sound on records created at Stax Studio in Memphis. Brian Epstein, the band's manager, investigated the possibility of recording at Stax, but the idea was abandoned after locals began descending on the Stax building, as were alternative plans to use either Atlantic Studios in New York or Motown's Hitsville USA facility in Detroit. (Note: Steve Cropper, then a member of the Stax house band and studio staff, believed that he would be producing the sessions, based on his conversations with Epstein.) McCartney later said that only "Taxman" and his own soul-inspired "Got to Get You into My Life" might have sounded better recorded in an American studio, but otherwise, the Beatles "found a new British sound almost by accident" on Revolver.

The Beatles began recording "Taxman" on 20 April, but the results were left unused. Ten new takes were taped on 21 April, the four tracks being filled with Ringo Starr's drums and McCartney's bass and Harrison's distorted rhythm guitar, followed by overdubs of McCartney's lead guitar, Harrison's lead vocal, and Lennon and McCartney's backing vocals. Beatles biographer Robert Rodriguez writes that although EMI engineer Geoff Emerick provided a withering account of Harrison's initial efforts to work out a solo, this was more reflective of Emerick's personality and is not borne out in McCartney and Harrison's recollections. McCartney said that he was discussing his idea for the solo with Harrison, and Harrison invited him to play it on the recording. Harrison said he was happy to have the song recorded for Revolver and was not fussed about who played the guitar solo. He added: "I was pleased to have him play that bit on 'Taxman'. If you notice, he did like a little Indian bit on it for me." (Note: Although some writers have said that an edit of the "Taxman" solo, slowed down and reversed, was overdubbed onto "Tomorrow Never Knows", technological advances in the 21st century have shown this to be incorrect.)

The chanted names of Wilson and Heath replaced two rapidly sung refrains of "Anybody got a bit of money?" heard in take 11 of the song. (Note: This early version was subsequently released on Anthology 2 in 1996.) The intro – a spoken "One, two, three, four" – was added during an overdubbing and mixing session on 16 May. The song's ending was created on 21 June. This consisted of the section containing the guitar solo being spliced onto the end of the recording, replacing a formal ending after Harrison's final vocal line, and continuing into a fadeout.

== Composition ==
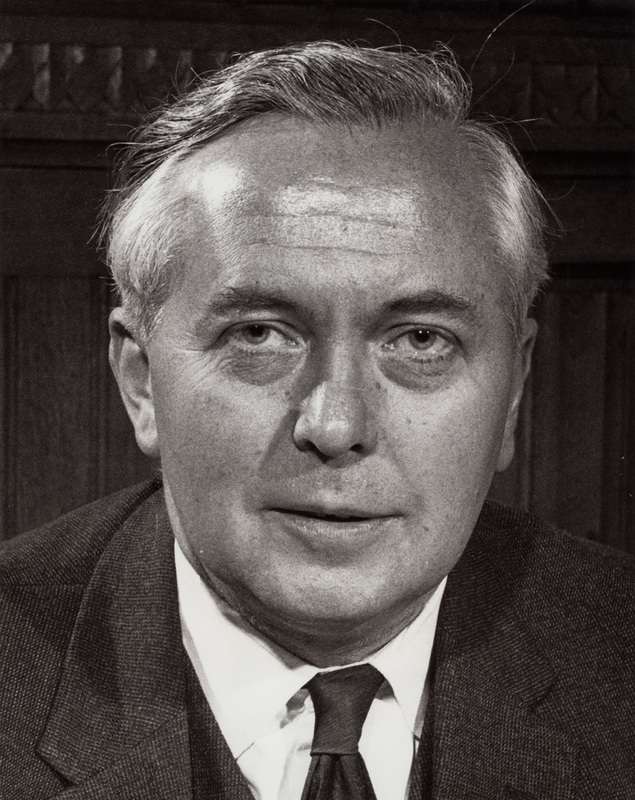
Harrison references Prime Minister Harold Wilson (pictured) and Conservative Party leader Ted Heath in the song's lyrics.

The song is in the key of D major and in 4/4 time. The recording begins before the actual song with coughing and counting (pointedly cut short, as the real count being heard in the background). The counting is delivered by Harrison in a "grim, miserly voice", according to Beatles biographer Jonathan Gould, and contrasts with a traditional count-in before a live performance. Gould sees "subtle self-mockery" in this gesture, since it reflects how, in the space of three years, the Beatles' focus had moved "from the dance floor to the counting house". Author Steve Turner describes "Taxman" as a "smart little pop art song" due to the references to Wilson and Heath and its drawing musical inspiration from Neil Hefti's "Batman Theme", from the 1966 television series Batman. (Note: The series premiered in January 1966 in the United States but not until late May in the UK. However, the Beatles had each received copies of the Marketts' recording of "Batman Theme" and Harrison had the record on his home jukebox.)

The chords stress the ♭7 scale degree (C-natural in the key of D major) and frequently involve a major/minor I chord (D/Dm) in the harmony, which consequently evokes either Mixolydian or Dorian modes. There is one ♭III (F chord) near the end, but unusually no V (A) chord. According to musicologist Dominic Pedler, the composition is also notable for its use of both a 5th-string voicing of the dominant seventh sharp ninth chord to embellish the tonic D^{7} chord at the end of each two-line verse (at 0:12 and 0:19), and a 6th-string form to create a complementary "jarring dissonance" with the lyrics in the subdominant (IV) G chord (to a G^{7♯9}) at 1:29 (after the solo) on "'Cause I'm the taxman, yeah – I'm the taxman". (Note: Pedler comments that this IV^{7♯9} chord also appears in McCartney's Rubber Soul track "Michelle". Where the latter employs it as part of a "slick Cycle of Fifths movement", in "Taxman" the chord "resolve[es] a progression through a ♭VII–IV–I, Double Plagal wrap-up in fourths".) Gould sees the band's exclamation of the word "Taxman!" before the solo as accentuating the comic comparison between the tax collector as a "civil servant superhero" and the DC Comics character Batman.

McCartney's bass line has been considered to imitate Motown bassist James Jamerson in its active lines and glissandi (at 0:55–1:08). In the third verse McCartney doubles his own pentatonic bass line while outlining the jarring Iflat7 chord in octaves (at 1:32–1:44).

Rolling Stone has described the completed track as "skeleton funk – Harrison's choppy fuzz-toned guitar chords moving against an R&B dance beat", with McCartney contributing a "screeching-raga guitar solo". The solo uses what musicologist Alan Pollack describes as "fast triplets, exotic modal touches, and a melodic shape which traverses several octaves and ends with a breathtaking upward flourish". Walter Everett considers that the solo is in the same Dorian mode that Harrison had recently adapted for his sitar part in "Love You To".

MacDonald writes that "Taxman" suggests the rhythmic influence of contemporaneous hit singles by James Brown, Lee Dorsey and the Spencer Davis Group, while music journalist Rob Chapman views Harrison's guitar riff as similarly American R&B-derived, citing also the Stax Records band Booker T. & the M.G.'s. (Note: Chapman describes the song's lyrics as "full of nouveau riche resentment". He sees this as an example of how Harrison's songwriting could turn from focusing on transcendence on "Love You To", which the Beatles recorded a week earlier, to secular concerns "in the blink of a third eye".) According to MacDonald, McCartney's solo "goes far beyond anything in the Indian style Harrison had done on guitar, the probable inspiration being Jeff Beck's ground-breaking solo on the Yardbirds' 'Shapes of Things'". (Note: Clayson comments that while Harrison was the most immersed in Indian music, McCartney was especially aware of market trends, and his "Taxman" solo reflected "shades of the abrasive passagework" used by Beck on the Yardbirds' hit song.) McCartney recalled that he approached the part wanting to add something "feedback-y and crazy" and likened its style and attitude to early-period Jimi Hendrix.

== Release ==
EMI's Parlophone label released Revolver on 5 August 1966, with "Taxman" sequenced as the opening track, before "Eleanor Rigby". According to Beatles biographer Nicholas Schaffner, having an unprecedented three compositions on a Beatles album – "Taxman", the fully Indian-styled "Love You To", and "I Want to Tell You" – established Harrison as a third "prolific" songwriter within the band. (Note: Author Ian Inglis writes that "Revolver has often been cited as the album on which Harrison came of age as a songwriter.") Music critic Tim Riley states that in Harrison's off-tempo delivery and sneer, the spoken count-in on "Taxman" announced the "new studio aesthetic of Revolver". He views this as a contrast with the shouted "One, two, three, four!" that introduced the band's "live sound" on "I Saw Her Standing There" in 1963, at the start of their debut album, Please Please Me.

"Taxman" was the Beatles' first topical song and the first political statement they had made in their music. Music historian David Simonelli, in his book Working Class Heroes, groups it with "Eleanor Rigby" and the band's May 1966 single tracks "Paperback Writer" and "Rain" as examples of the Beatles' "pointed social commentary" that consolidated their "dominance of London's social scene". He likens this aspect to the Rolling Stones' development at this time, whereby a group's songs "had to comment on the values that marked affluence in Britain". In a 1968 interview, Lennon referenced "Taxman" as part of the Beatles' anti-authoritarian outlook; he said it was an "anti-establishment tax song" and that the band still protested against having to pay the government unless it was for a "communal or Communist or real Christian society". He was taken aback when the Dutch interviewer, Abram de Swaan, criticised the song's message and insisted that taxes should be high to benefit the whole of society. (Note: Commenting on the Revolver sequencing, Everett writes that whereas McCartney's imagery in "Eleanor Rigby" is "common enough to elicit enormous compassion" for that song's two lonely protagonists, "only those in the highest earning brackets would be likely to feel an overwhelming compassion for the ultrarich victims of ['Taxman']".)

The omission of "Taxman", along with any other Harrison-written track, was one of the main complaints that fans levelled against the Beatles' 1973 double LP 1962–1966, released three years after the group's break-up. In 1976, following the expiration of the band's contract with EMI/Capitol, "Taxman" was included on Capitol's themed Beatles compilation Rock 'n' Roll Music. Later that year, Capitol – ignoring Harrison's wishes that none of his Beatles-era songs appear – also included it on The Best of George Harrison. (Note: For the 2006 remix album Love, the guitar solo from "Taxman" was edited into the piece "Drive My Car"/"The Word"/"What You're Doing".)

When Harrison published his autobiography in 1980, Lennon was deeply hurt by the minimal coverage afforded him in the book. Responding to this in a 1987 interview, Harrison said: "He was annoyed 'cos I didn't say he'd written one line of the song 'Taxman'. But I also didn't say how I wrote two lines of 'Come Together' or three lines of 'Eleanor Rigby', you know – I wasn't getting into any of that." (Note: Harrison concluded: "I think, in the balance, I would have had more things to be niggled with him about than he would have had with me.")

== Critical reception ==
Writing in The Village Voice, Richard Goldstein described Revolver as "revolutionary" and the Beatles' "great leap forward", and highlighted "Taxman" as "the album's example of political cheek, in which George enumerates Britain's current economic woes". He added that by naming both Wilson and Heath as "the villains", the Beatles "lay it right on the non-partisan line". In their joint album review in Record Mirror, Richard Green characterised the track as "Big beat rock 'n' roll", adding, "I liked it. Good idea", while Peter Jones found it "[a] bit repetitive" but "Loved the wild, strident guitar mid-way". KRLA Beat's reviewer said it was "One of the best and most commercial George Harrison compositions for some time", adding: "It is also one of the best, most concise satirical comments on British society and the current tax situation (not to mention our own!) to come along from anyone for some time." Paul Williams of Crawdaddy! found it succeeded as a humorous song unlike "Yellow Submarine" but that the Indian-style instrumental break was "out of place" unlike on "Love You To". He said that lines such as "Ha-ha, Mr Wilson" were "delightful" and dubbed the song "Batman goes protest".

Ian MacDonald writes that, while Harrison was "rightly praised" for his composition, "Taxman" benefited from the whole group's creativity. He highlights McCartney's bass part as "remarkable" and his guitar solo as "outstanding". Alex Petridis of The Guardian considers it "faintly mind-boggling" that the Beatles departed from their usual approach to album tracks by issuing "Yellow Submarine" as a single from Revolver, saying that "Taxman" was one of the songs that would have been more worthy.

"Taxman" was ranked 48th in Mojo's list of "The 101 Greatest Beatles Songs", compiled in 2006 by a panel of critics and musicians. In his commentary for the magazine, singer Joe Brown cited the track as a "brilliant example" of how, just as Harrison's guitar playing was often crucial in Lennon and McCartney's compositions, he was never selfish in his musicianship but was instead motivated to "get the best for the song" each time. Brown added: "everyone [is] chipping in with guitar parts and harmonies ... There's no fat at all on it. And, [it's] very funny." On a similar list compiled by Rolling Stone in 2010, the song appeared at number 55, where the editors described it as "a crucial link between the guitar-driven clang of the Beatles' 1963–65 sound and the emerging splendor of the group's experiments in psychedelia". In 2018, the music staff of Time Out London ranked "Taxman" at number seven on their list of the best Beatles songs.

In 2015, the editors of Guitar World ranked "Taxman" at number three in their list of "The Beatles' 50 Greatest Guitar Moments". They praised the solo as "a stunningly sophisticated creation, drawn from an Indian-derived Dorian mode and featuring descending pull-offs that recall Jeff Beck's work on the Yardbirds' 'Shapes of Things'" and said that while McCartney had played lead guitar on some previous Beatles tracks, "Taxman" was when he "[came] into his own as a guitarist". In 2001, when VH1 chose Revolver as its all-time greatest rock 'n' roll album, "Taxman" was among the four tracks, along with "Eleanor Rigby", "Tomorrow Never Knows" and "Yellow Submarine", cited by Bill Flanagan to support the contention that "If pop music were destroyed tomorrow, we could re-create it from this album alone."

== Legacy ==
In his book Psychedelia and Other Colours, Rob Chapman highlights "Taxman" as an example of the Beatles' widespread influence on rock music's developments during the 1960s. He says that Harrison's guitar riff "runs like an unbroken thread through the development of English psychedelia" and is also present "as a trace element in many a mod-pop mutation". Writing in Rolling Stone's Harrison commemorative book, in January 2002, Mikal Gilmore recognised his incorporation of dissonance in the melody to "Taxman" and "I Want to Tell You" as having been "revolutionary in popular music" in 1966. Gilmore considered this quality to be "perhaps more originally creative" than the avant-garde styling that Lennon and McCartney took from Karlheinz Stockhausen, Luciano Berio, Edgar Varese and Igor Stravinsky and brought to the Beatles' work over the same period. Revolver has been recognised as having inspired new subgenres of music, anticipating punk rock in the case of "Taxman". It's Psychedelic Baby! magazine has referred to the single as freakbeat.

["Taxman" has] actually aged more gracefully over the years than many another "political" song from the sixties or any other period. Must be something about the perennial inevitability of the subject matter ... I heard it played over the P.A. system at the local post office one recent ides of April. Cheap joke, huh?

— Musicologist Alan Pollack, 1994

During the 1996 US presidential election, publicity for Republican candidate Bob Dole stated that he would be using a tape of "Taxman" in his campaign rallies. This was in response to his Democratic opponent, Bill Clinton, adopting a personal anecdote from his past as a student in England, detailing how he defended Starr in a Liverpool pub brawl, as part of his campaign rhetoric. In early 2002, according to musicologist Russell Reising, "one of the largest [tax] preparation companies in the United States" used a version of "Taxman" in their television commercials. In 2006, Virginia State Senator and future Republican gubernatorial candidate Ken Cuccinelli introduced an amendment to make "Taxman" the state song of Virginia, stating that taxes were an important part of Virginia history. He gave the example of Patrick Henry's strong opposition to British taxation during the American Revolution. The measure did not pass.

Quartz reporter Aamna Mohdin describes "Taxman" as "the mother of all tax protest songs" amid a wealth of creative works that convey "the misery of taxes". A 2019 article in Tax Journal stated that the Beatles' legacy endures in the "world of tax" through the song, which had become the "karaoke favourite" of Her Majesty's Revenue and Customs, and through "the 'Beatles clause' – a targeted anti-avoidance rule aimed at preventing entertainers from converting highly taxed income to lower-tax capital receipts". While debating the merits of reintroducing supertax in the UK, the writers warned against a return to the level imposed by Wilson, which they said, in support of Harrison's contention, "wasn't a fair progressive system. It was outright theft." Cultural commentator Christopher Bray finds "Taxman" highly amusing and describes Harrison as "one of the Sixties' greatest poets of sybaritic hedonism". However, he cites the song, along with the Kinks' "Sunny Afternoon", as reflective of how the generation that had benefited from the implementation of postwar welfare policies and Keynesian economics in Britain were too quick to take them for granted by 1965, an approach he sees as enabling Margaret Thatcher's "neo-liberal revolution" of the 1980s. On 14 October 2022, a music video for the song directed by Danny Sangra was released on the band's official YouTube channel to promote the deluxe edition of Revolver.

== Other versions, tributes and parodies ==
The Beatles chose not to perform any of the songs from Revolver in concert, and Harrison first played "Taxman" live on his 1991 Japanese tour with Eric Clapton. He took to introducing it as "a very old song written in 1873". In other comments at that time, he said its message was relevant "regardless if it's the Sixties, Seventies, Eighties, [or] Nineties", since "There's always a taxman." Harrison changed the lyrics, updating the politicians to John Major, George Bush and Boris Yeltsin, making reference to VAT, and including a new bridge that ended with the lines "If you wipe your feet, I'll tax the mat / If you're overweight, I'll tax your fat."

"Taxman" was covered by the 1960s garage-psychedelic band the Music Machine in a version that music critic Richie Unterberger describes as "[sticking] pretty close to the original arrangement", while a recording by Junior Parker fully explored the song's soul traits. Writing for Rough Guides, Chris Ingham includes a version by avant-garde cellist Fred Lonberg-Holm in his selection of "bizarre Beatles covers". Recorded in 1992 at the Knitting Factory nightclub in New York, the five-minute track contains "fiery" improvisation, according to Ingham, who deems it a "witty, intense, unsettling" interpretation.

Tom Petty and the Heartbreakers played "Taxman" in tribute to Harrison at the Concert for George, held at London's Royal Albert Hall in November 2002. On the 2003 Songs from the Material World Harrison tribute album, former Rolling Stone Bill Wyman contributed a version that Johnny Loftus of AllMusic views as "effective, if not particularly memorable". (Note: The song has also been covered by Black Oak Arkansas, Stevie Ray Vaughan, Nickel Creek, Garrison Starr, Rockwell, Mutual Admiration Society and Power Station, among others.)

Cheap Trick's "Taxman, Mr Thief", from their 1977 eponymous debut album, is an homage to the Beatles' song, dealing in similar lyrical themes. The Jam adapted the riff and rhythm from "Taxman" in their 1980 hit single "Start!" BBC music critic Chris Jones describes it as "'Taxman' in all but name, but done so wonderfully as to negate any gripes". David Fricke of Rolling Stone similarly writes that the Jam "hijacked" the original recording's key "eccentric force ... in Harrison's hydraulic-R&B rhythm guitar", but did so "with love".

"Weird Al" Yankovic recorded a parody of "Taxman" in late 1981, during the height of the Pac-Man game's popularity. Titled "Pac-Man", it was first released on the 2017 compilation Squeeze Box: The Complete Works of "Weird Al" Yankovic. Beatallica's 2004 track "Sandman" parodies "Taxman" and the Metallica song "Enter Sandman".

== Personnel ==
According to Ian MacDonald, except where noted:

- George Harrison – lead vocals, rhythm & lead guitars
- John Lennon – backing vocals
- Paul McCartney – backing vocals, bass guitar, lead guitar (solo)
- Ringo Starr – drums, cowbell, tambourine

== Sources ==
- Badman, Keith (2001). The Beatles Diary Volume 2: After the Break-Up 1970–2001. London: Omnibus Press. ISBN 978-0-7119-8307-6.
- The Beatles (2000). The Beatles Anthology. San Francisco, CA: Chronicle Books. ISBN 0-8118-2684-8.
- Bray, Christopher (2014). 1965: The Year Modern Britain Was Born. London: Simon & Schuster. ISBN 978-1-84983-387-5.
- Chapman, Rob (2015). Psychedelia and Other Colours. London: Faber & Faber. ISBN 978-0-571-28200-5.
- Clayson, Alan (2003a). George Harrison. London: Sanctuary. ISBN 1-86074-489-3.
- Clayson, Alan (2003b). Paul McCartney. London: Sanctuary. ISBN 1-86074-482-6.
- The Editors of Rolling Stone (2002). Harrison. New York, NY: Rolling Stone Press. ISBN 978-0-7432-3581-5.
- Everett, Walter (1999). The Beatles as Musicians: Revolver Through the Anthology. New York, NY: Oxford University Press. ISBN 978-0-19-512941-0.
- Gould, Jonathan (2007). Can't Buy Me Love: The Beatles, Britain and America. London: Piatkus. ISBN 978-0-7499-2988-6.
- Guesdon, Jean-Michel; Margotin, Philippe (2013). All the Songs: The Story Behind Every Beatles Release. New York, NY: Black Dog & Leventhal. ISBN 978-1-57912-952-1.
- Harrison, George (2002) [1980]. I, Me, Mine. San Francisco, CA: Chronicle Books. ISBN 978-0-8118-5900-4.
- Ingham, Chris (2003). The Rough Guide to the Beatles. London: Rough Guides. ISBN 1-84353-140-2.
- Inglis, Ian (2010). The Words and Music of George Harrison. Santa Barbara, CA: Praeger. ISBN 978-0-313-37532-3.
- Lewisohn, Mark (2005) [1988]. The Complete Beatles Recording Sessions: The Official Story of the Abbey Road Years 1962–1970. London: Bounty Books. ISBN 978-0-7537-2545-0.
- MacDonald, Ian (2005). Revolution in the Head: The Beatles' Records and the Sixties (2nd rev. ed.). London: Pimlico. ISBN 1-84413-828-3.
- Pedler, Dominic (2003). The Songwriting Secrets of the Beatles. London: Omnibus Press. ISBN 978-0-7119-8167-6.
- Reising, Russell (2002). "Introduction: 'Of the beginning'". In Reising, Russell (ed.). "Every Sound There Is": The Beatles' Revolver and the Transformation of Rock and Roll. Farnham, UK: Ashgate Publishing. ISBN 978-0-7546-0557-7.
- Riley, Tim (2002) [1988]. Tell Me Why – The Beatles: Album by Album, Song by Song, the Sixties and After. Cambridge, MA: Da Capo Press. ISBN 978-0-306-81120-3.
- Rodriguez, Robert (2010). Fab Four FAQ 2.0: The Beatles' Solo Years, 1970–1980. Milwaukee, WI: Backbeat Books. ISBN 978-1-4165-9093-4.
- Rodriguez, Robert (2012). Revolver: How the Beatles Reimagined Rock 'n' Roll. Milwaukee, WI: Backbeat Books. ISBN 978-1-61713-009-0.
- Savage, Jon (2015). 1966: The Year the Decade Exploded. London: Faber & Faber. ISBN 978-0-571-27763-6.
- Schaffner, Nicholas (1978). The Beatles Forever. New York, NY: McGraw-Hill. ISBN 0-07-055087-5.
- Simonelli, David (2013). Working Class Heroes: Rock Music and British Society in the 1960s and 1970s. Lanham, MD: Lexington Books. ISBN 978-0-7391-7051-9.
- Turner, Steve (2016). Beatles '66: The Revolutionary Year. New York, NY: Ecco. ISBN 978-0-06-247558-9.
- Unterberger, Richie (2006). The Unreleased Beatles: Music & Film. San Francisco, CA: Backbeat Books. ISBN 978-0-87930-892-6.
- Winn, John C. (2009). That Magic Feeling: The Beatles' Recorded Legacy, Volume Two, 1966–1970. New York, NY: Three Rivers Press. ISBN 978-0-307-45239-9.
- Womack, Kenneth (2014). The Beatles Encyclopedia: Everything Fab Four. Santa Barbara, CA: ABC-CLIO. ISBN 978-0-313-39171-2.
