= List of songs written by Berry Gordy =

This is a list of songs written by Berry Gordy, in most cases with other songwriters.

== Chart hits and other notable songs written by Gordy ==
Year	Song	Original artist	Co-writer(s) with Gordy	^{U.S. Pop}	^{U.S. R&B}	^{UK Singles Chart}	Other charting versions, and notes
1957	"Reet Petite"	Jackie Wilson	Tyran Carlo	62	-	6	1979: Darts, #51 UK; 1986: Jackie Wilson, #1 UK (reissue)
1958	"To Be Loved'"	Jackie Wilson	Gwen Gordy, Tyran Carlo	22	7	23	1958: Malcolm Vaughan, #14 UK; 1979: Michael Henderson, #62 R&B
1958	"We Have Love"	Jackie Wilson	Tyran Carlo, George Gordy	93	-	-	
1958	"It's So Fine"	LaVern Baker	Tyran Carlo	-	24	-	
1958	"Lonely Teardrops"	Jackie Wilson	Gwen Gordy, Tyran Carlo	7	1	-	1971: Brian Hyland, #54 pop 1976: Narvel Felts, #62 pop
1959	"Just for Your Love"	The Falcons	Gwen Gordy, Tyran Carlo	-	26	-	
1959	"Come to Me"	Marv Johnson	Marv Johnson	30	6	-	
1959	"That's Why (I Love You So)"	Jackie Wilson	Tyran Carlo	13	2	-	
1959	"I'll Be Satisfied"	Jackie Wilson	Tyran Carlo	20	6	-	1982: Shakin' Stevens, #10 UK
1959	"Bad Girl"	The Miracles	Smokey Robinson	93	-	-	
1959	"You Got What It Takes"	Marv Johnson	Gwen Gordy, Tyran Carlo, Marv Johnson	10	2	7	1960: Johnny Kidd & the Pirates, #25 UK; 1965: Joe Tex, #51 pop, #10 R&B; 1966: The Dave Clark Five, #7 pop, #28 UK; 1977: Showaddywaddy, #2 UK
1960	"Money (That's What I Want)"	Barrett Strong	Janie Bradford	23	2	-	1962: Jennell Hawkins, #17 R&B; 1963: Bern Elliott and the Fenmen, #14 UK; 1964: The Kingsmen (live), #16 pop, #6 R&B; 1966: Jr. Walker & the All-Stars, #52 pop, #35 R&B; 1979: The Flying Lizards, #50 pop, #5 UK; 1994: The Backbeat Band, #48 UK
1960	"I Love the Way You Love"	Marv Johnson	"Mikaljon" (Mike Ossman, Al Abrams, John O'Den)	9	2	35	
1960	"All I Could Do Was Cry"	Etta James	Gwen Gordy, Tyran Carlo	33	2	-	
1960	"Ain't Gonna Be That Way"	Marv Johnson	Marv Johnson	74	-	50	
1960	"All the Love I Got"	Marv Johnson	Brian Holland, Janie Bradford	63	-	-	
1960	"Who's the Fool"	Singin' Sammy Ward	Smokey Robinson	-	23	-	
1960	"(You've Got to) Move Two Mountains"	Marv Johnson		20	12	-	
1960	"Happy Days"	Marv Johnson	Toni McKnight	58	7	-	
1960	"Shop Around"	The Miracles	Smokey Robinson	2	1	-	1976: Captain & Tennille, #4 pop
1961	"Don't Let Him Shop Around"	Debbie Dean	Smokey Robinson, Loucye Gordy Wakefield	92	-	-	
1961	"Merry-Go-Round"	Marv Johnson		61	26	-	
1961	"Ain't It Baby"	The Miracles	Smokey Robinson	49	15	-	
1961	"Broken Hearted"	The Miracles	Smokey Robinson	97	-	-	
1961	"I Don't Want to Take a Chance"	Mary Wells	William "Mickey" Stevenson	33	9	-	
1962	"Dream Come True "	The Temptations		-	22	-	
1962	"Do You Love Me"	The Contours		3	1	-	1963: Brian Poole & The Tremeloes, #1 UK; 1963: The Dave Clark Five, #30 UK; 1970: Deep Feeling, #34 UK; 1984: Andy Fraser, #82 pop 1988: The Contours, #11 pop (reissue); 1995: Duke Baysee, #46 UK
1962	"Way Over There"	The Miracles	Smokey Robinson	94	-	-	
1962	"Let Me Go the Right Way"	The Supremes		90	26	-	
1962	"Shake Sherry"	The Contours		43	21	-	
1963	"Two Wrongs Don't Make a Right"	Mary Wells	Smokey Robinson	100	-	-	
1963	"Don't Let Her Be Your Baby"	The Contours		64	-	-	
1963	"My Daddy Knows Best "	The Marvelettes		67	-	-	
1964	"Try It Baby"	Marvin Gaye		15	6	-	
1967	"You've Made Me So Very Happy"	Brenda Holloway	Brenda Holloway, Patrice Holloway, Frank Wilson	39	40	-	1969: Blood, Sweat & Tears, #2 pop, #46 R&B, #35 UK; 1970: Lou Rawls, #95 pop, #32 R&B
1969	"I'm Livin' in Shame"	Diana Ross & the Supremes	Pam Sawyer, R. Dean Taylor, Frank Wilson, Henry Cosby	10	8	14	
1969	"No Matter What Sign You Are"	Diana Ross & the Supremes	Henry Cosby	31	17	37	1983: Russell Grant, #87 UK
1969	"I Want You Back"	The Jackson 5	The Corporation (Gordy, Freddie Perren, Deke Richards, Fonce Mizell)	1	1	2	1988: The Jackson 5, #8 UK (remix); 1998: Cleopatra, #4 UK; 2007: The Jackson 5, #53 UK (reissue); 2009: The Jackson 5, #43 UK (reissue)
1970	"ABC"	The Jackson 5	The Corporation	1	1	8	2009: The Jackson 5, #50 UK (reissue); 2011: The Glee Cast, #88 pop
1970	"One More Chance"	The Jackson 5	The Corporation	-	-	-	1997: One, #31 UK
1970	"The Love You Save"	The Jackson 5	The Corporation	1	1	7	
1970	"I'll Be There"	The Jackson 5	Bob West, Hal Davis, Willie Hutch	1	1	4	1992: Mariah Carey (live), #1 pop, #11 R&B, #2 UK; 2009: The Jackson 5, #49 UK (reissue)
1970	"Give Love on Christmas Day"	The Jackson 5	Freddie Perren, Christine Perren, Fonce Mizell, Deke Richards	-	-	-	1998: Johnny Gill, #71 R&B
1971	"Mama's Pearl"	The Jackson 5	The Corporation	2	2	25	
1971	"Maybe Tomorrow"	The Jackson 5	The Corporation	20	3	-	1987: UB40, #14 UK
1971	"Bless You"	Martha Reeves and the Vandellas	The Corporation	53	29	33	
1971	"Sugar Daddy"	The Jackson 5	The Corporation	10	3	-	
1972	"(We've Got a) Good Thing Going"	Michael Jackson	The Corporation	-	-	-	1981: Sugar Minott, #4 UK; 1996: Yazz, #53 UK; 2000: Sid Owen, #14 UK
1973	"Get It Together"	The Jackson 5	Hal Davis, Don Fletcher, Jerry Marcellino, Mel Larson	28	2	-	
1980	"Power"	The Temptations	Angelo Bond, Jean Mayer	43	11	-	
1997	"All I Want"	702	The Corporation, Charles Farrar, Troy Taylor	35	33	-	
