= Captured (Rockwell album) =

1985 studio album by Rockwell

Studio album by Rockwell
- Released: January 15, 1985
- Recorded: 1984
- Studio: Motown/Hitsville USA
- Genre: Synth-pop; dance-pop; R&B
- Length: 37:50
- Label: Motown
- Producer: Curtis Anthony Nolen; Rockwell

Rockwell chronology
Somebody's Watching Me (1984)	Captured (1985)	The Genie (1986)

Singles from Captured
- 1. "He's a Cobra"; 2. "Peeping Tom"; 3. "Tokyo"

Professional ratings
Review scores
Source	Rating
AllMusic	2/5 stars

Captured is second studio album by singer-songwriter Rockwell. It was a follow-up to the gold album Somebody's Watching Me.

Despite featuring one single featuring Stevie Wonder and another appearing on the soundtrack of The Last Dragon, it underperformed commercially, debuting at #120 on the Billboard 200.

== Background ==
As Rockwell had done on his previous album, he solicited the help of another prominent recording artist to sing with him on the first single. Instead of Michael Jackson, however, this time he got Stevie Wonder to record the song "He's a Cobra" with him. The song was a flop.

The next single, "Peeping Tom", appeared on the soundtrack to The Last Dragon, but it too was a disappointment.

In late 2021, the album became available on iTunes for the first time.

== Track listing ==
1. "Peeping Tom" (Rockwell, Janet Cole, Antoine Green) – 4:31
2. "He's a Cobra" (Curtis Anthony Nolen, Peter Rafelson) – 4:33
3. "T.V. Psychology" (Robbie Nevil, Mark Holding) – 4:10
4. "We Live in a Jungle" (Curtis Anthony Nolen, Ron Aniello, Gardner Cole) – 3:48
5. "Captured (By an Evil Mind)" (Rockwell, Janet Cole, Tony LeMans) – 5:19
6. "Don't It Make You Cry" (Rockwell) – 5:22
7. "Tokyo" (Curtis Anthony Nolen, John Duarte, Frank Busey) – 5:34
8. "Costa Rica" (Curtis Anthony Nolen, John Duarte, Frank Busey) – 4:33

== Personnel ==
- Rockwell – lead and backing vocals, keyboards, synthesizers
- Brenda K. Pierce, Gregory Alexander, Julia Waters, Mark Holding, Maxine Waters, Melody McCully, Oren Waters, Pam Vicente, Robbie Nevil, Lamotte Smith, Stevie Wonder – backing vocals
- John Duarte, John Van Tongeren, Peter Rafelson, Randy Kerber, Raymond Crossley – keyboards, synthesizers
- Curtis Anthony Nolen – guitars, keyboards, synthesizers
- Robbie Nevil, TJ Parker – guitars
- Michael Dunlap, Neil Stubenhaus – bass
- John Robinson – acoustic and electronic drums and percussion, Simmons Drums
- Dan Higgins, Terry Harrington – saxophone
- Bill Reichenbach, Bob Payne – trombone
- Chuck Findley, Gary Grant, Jerry Hey – trumpet

=== Production ===
- Executive Producer: Ray Singleton
- Producer: Curtis Anthony Nolen and Rockwell for Super Three Productions
- Recording Engineers: Bob Robitalle, Curtis Anthony Nolen, Rockwell, Steve Smith; assisted by Karen Siegel, Michael Dotson and Ralph Sutton
- Mixed by Russ Terrana and Steve Smith
- Mastered by John Matousek
