= Reggie Benjamin =

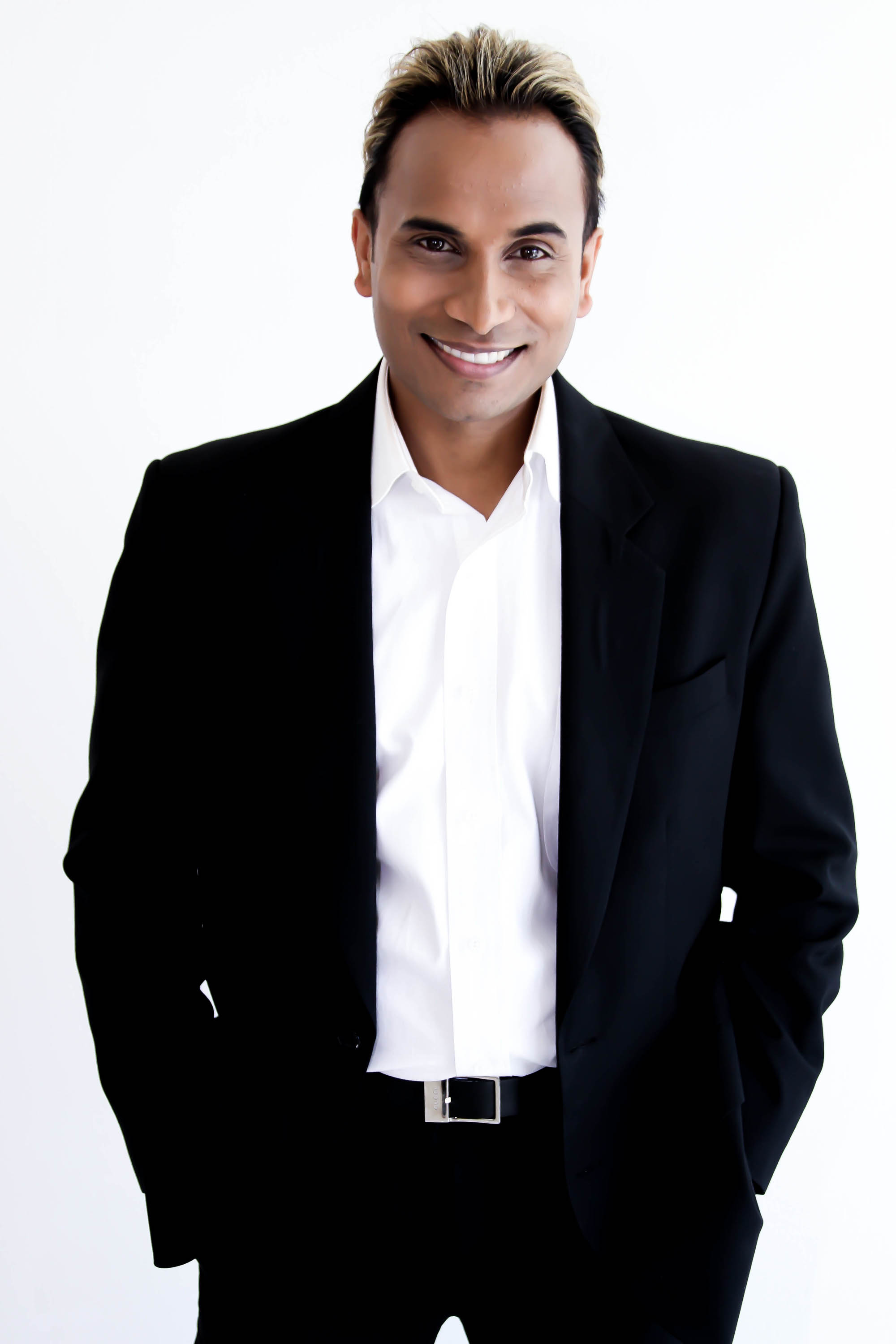

Background information
- Born: Canada
- Occupations: Singer, songwriter
- Years active: 1997-present
- Website: www.officialreggiebenjamin.com

Reggie Benjamin is a Canadian pop singer.

== Early life and career ==
Benjamin was born in Canada to parents that had recently immigrated from India. At the age of nine his parents moved to the US and his childhood and youth was spent in Chicago. His father was a Christian preacher, who raised Benjamin on Elvis Presley's gospel music. He graduated from Chicago's Columbia College with a degrees in Music Voice and the city's College du Page with a degree in Business Communications, both in 1997. Upon leaving school he founded the recording label Club 2X Records. He began the label with $110, and by July 2001 the label had more than $2,000,000 in turnover. As of 2019Reggie Benjamin is currently one part of a Pop Duo called Rewona. (The Duo Includes Reggie Benjamin himself and Iwona Benjamin ) managed by Mark Shayatovich. The Duo has had much success all over the world and has sold out many venues (all music is written and produced by Reggie Benjamin). Reggie Benjamin has appeared as a singer on many TV shows including The Real Housewives of Beverly Hills.

== Recording career ==
In 2001 Benjamin broke out from the Chicago club scene by filming a music video at the Playboy Mansion for his debut single Hurry Up from his debut album 2X Centrix, which became popular in India. The video reached the number two spot on MTV Asia that year. The single Hurry Up also reached the top 10 charts of fifteen countries, including Italy, Spain and Russia. At this point he had already signed five additional acts to his label. The full album was released in May 2002, with newspapers naming him the "first Indian pop star". Benjamin collaborated with Joanie Laurer on the album (better known as WWF wrestler Chyna), which served as Laurer's debut album. He also collaborated with reality television contestant Sarah Kozer on the song "Crazy Freaky". In 2004 Benjamin and Laurer released a second album called Smile.

In 2005 E! Entertainment named Benjamin one of the ten most influential Indians living in the United States (citations needed), as the first Indian-American to ever reach a position on the US Billboard music charts. The statement was made during an on-air Celebrity Uncensored segment entitled "First Indian Pop Artist in America", featuring Benjamin's career and his hit song Ride reaching number four on the Billboard Breakouts for Hot Dance Club Play chart. Overall, he his music has reached the music charts of more than fifteen countries. In May 2005 he was invited to sing the national anthem at a Los Angeles Dodgers baseball game and he was nominated at the 2006 Black Music Awards for Best New Artist and Best Neo-Soul Song. He was the winner in the America's Next Star/Best New Artist category. That year he was also named by Bibi Magazine as one of the world's sexiest men. By 2006 he had recorded ten hit songs reaching the charts in more than twenty-five countries. In 2026, Benjamin released an album called Harmony in Blue: The Duets.

== Film career ==
Reggie produced and scored the documentary on ending human trafficking, called Save Her, Co-financed and produced with Producer Nitish Kannan. It will be released on Amazon Prime in 2020.

Rewona and Reggie Benjamin as of 2019 are working with award winning producer Michael Lloyd (Who has over 150 Gold and Platinum records under his belt) on a new album entitled Gin Dobry. Reggie Benjamin also wrote a song for charity against human trafficking and many celebrities including Justin Bieber have shown their support.
