= Tax Journal =

- Frequency: Weekly
- Publisher: LexisNexis
- First issue: 1989
- Country: United Kingdom
- Based in: Sutton, Surrey
- Language: English
- Website: www.taxjournal.com

Tax Journal is a weekly magazine relating to business taxation in the United Kingdom published by LexisNexis. The magazine has been published since 1989, originally as The Tax Journal.
