= Ray Singleton =

American R&B producer, songwriter and vocalist (1937–2016)

Background information
- Also known as: Miss Ray; Raynoma Liles; Raynoma Gordy; Raynoma Gordy Singleton; Raynoma Ossman
- Born: Raynoma Mayberry; March 8, 1937; Detroit, Michigan, U.S.
- Died: November 11, 2016 (aged 79) Woodland Hills, California, U.S.
- Genres: R&B, Disco
- Occupations: Songwriter; Producer
- Instruments: Vocals, piano
- Years active: 1958–2016
- Labels: Motown, Shrine, Scepter

Raynoma Mayberry Liles Gordy Singleton (March 8, 1937 – November 11, 2016) was an American R&B producer, songwriter, and vocalist perhaps best known for her association with ex-husband, Berry Gordy during the early days of Motown when she was often known as Miss Ray.

== Early life ==
Raynoma Mayberry was born on March 8, 1937, in Detroit, Michigan. She was her mother Lucille's eighth child, but her first by her marriage to Ashby Mayberry. Although her father worked as a janitor for Cadillac, he did well enough to purchase a house on Detroit's Blaine Street in a predominantly Jewish neighborhood.

In the mid 1950s, Raynoma met and married Charles Liles, an aspiring musician. They had one son, Cliff Liles, born in December 1955. Burdened by financial pressures, the marriage soon folded.

== Career ==
=== Early association with Berry Gordy ===
In 1958, Raynoma and her younger sister, Alice, auditioned as a duo for a young songwriter named Berry Gordy. Sensing that Gordy was not excited about their singing, Raynoma told him that she could also write and arrange music. Before long, she was doing just that, becoming a vital part of his budding operation.

Later, Gordy had her put together a backup vocal group, which was composed of singers who had been hanging around the studio. Gordy, who loved contractions, decided to call the group the Rayber Voices after their given names, Raynoma and Berry. In addition to Ray, the singers in the group were Brian Holland, Robert Bateman, Sonny Sanders and later, Gwendolyn Murray and Louvain Demps. Together, Ray and Berry also formed a music producing and publishing firm, Rayber Music Writing Company.

=== Motown ===
Tired of the paltry royalty checks that he was receiving, Gordy was encouraged by Ray and Smokey Robinson to start his own record company. Ray located a two-story house at 2648 West Grand Boulevard as the headquarters for the new enterprise. Gordy placed her in charge of the company's publishing operations (now known as Jobete) with the assistance of her brother, Mike Ossman, and Janie Bradford, the company's first receptionist.

After the birth of their child, Kerry, and his divorce from his previous wife was final, Ray and Berry Gordy were married. Not long after the marriage, Gordy began having an affair with Margaret Norton, who he once described as "the most beautiful woman in Detroit." However, by the time he finally decided to end the affair, his marriage with Ray was over.

As the details of their separation were being worked out, Ray indicated that she still wanted to work for Motown. Gordy accepted her proposal to establish an office of Jobete in New York City.

However, with the cost of living being much higher in New York than Detroit, Ray struggled to get proper funding to maintain her office. After repeated attempts to obtain additional funding had failed, Ray decided to take desperate measures. Against the advice of Eddie Singleton (her partner and future husband) she arranged to bootleg five thousand copies of the Motown single, "My Guy" by Mary Wells to keep the office open.

When Berry Gordy found out what happened, he was furious. He did not however, press charges. After their divorce was finalized, they remained on amicable terms. So much so that after Ray married Eddie Singleton, Gordy loaned the couple money so that they could start their own record label in the nation's capital, Washington, D.C.

=== Shrine Records ===
Ray and Eddie Singleton formed a record label, Shrine, which was based in Washington, D.C. When the label proved unsuccessful, Ray returned to Motown in 1968.

=== Super Three ===
Raynoma formed a partnership with Motown under the Super Three banner. One of the most successful projects under that arrangement was Rockwell’s Top 10 album, Somebody's Watching Me, in which she served as executive producer.

== Personal life ==
Ray Singleton was married three times and had three sons and one daughter from her various marriages.

Her first husband was Charles Liles; they had one son together, recording artist Cliff Liles. Cliff has recorded for Motown with two groups, Apollo and Kagny & The Dirty Rats.

From 1960-1964, Singleton was married to her second husband, Berry Gordy; they had one son together, musician and entertainment executive Kerry Gordy. Kerry was also a member of the group Apollo, along with his brother, Cliff Liles.

From 1966-1970, Singleton was married to her third husband, Eddie Singleton; they had one son together, William Edward Singleton, Jr., as well as a daughter, recording artist Rya Singleton.

=== Death ===
Singleton died on November 11, 2016, of brain cancer in Woodland Hills, California.

== Credits ==
=== Producing ===
Release date	Album	Artist(s) or Group	Capacity(ies)
1979	Apollo	Apollo	Producer
1984	Somebody's Watching Me	Rockwell	Executive Producer
1985	Captured	Rockwell	Executive Producer

== Bibliography ==
- Singleton, Raynoma (1990), Berry, Me and Motown : The Untold Story, Contemporary Books, ISBN 978-0809243402.

== Bibliography ==
- Gordy Singleton, Raynoma (1990). Berry, Me, and Motown. Contemporary Books. ISBN 9780809243402.
