= Rockwell (musician) =

American musician (born 1964)

- Rockwell in 1986
- Born: Kennedy William Gordy; March 15, 1964 (age 62); Detroit, Michigan, U.S.
- Occupations: Musician; singer
- Years active: 1971–present
- Father: Berry Gordy
- Relatives: Kerry Gordy (half-brother); Redfoo (half-brother); Rhonda Ross Kendrick (half-sister); Sky Blu (nephew); Rodney Kendrick (brother-in-law); Denise Gordy (cousin); Jimmy Carter (second cousin once removed); Jack Carter (third cousin); Amy Carter (third cousin); Jason Carter (third cousin once removed)
- Musical career
- Genres: Pop; R&B
- Instruments: Vocals; keyboards; synthesizers; drums; percussion
- Label: Motown

Kennedy William Gordy (born March 15, 1964), known professionally as Rockwell, is an American musician. He is best known for his hit single "Somebody's Watching Me", which features an uncredited Michael Jackson on chorus vocals. Gordy is the son of Motown founder Berry Gordy. Other relatives include half-siblings Redfoo, Rhonda Ross Kendrick and nephew Sky Blu.

== Early life ==
Kennedy William Gordy is the son of Motown founder and CEO Berry Gordy and Margaret Norton. His father named him Kennedy William after John F. Kennedy and William "Smokey" Robinson.

Growing up in Detroit during the peak of Motown's influence, Gordy was immersed in music and show business from an early age. Despite his father's position as Motown's founder, he reportedly sought to establish a career independently, concerned about accusations of nepotism. Gordy arranged his own audition and signed a recording contract with Motown without Berry Gordy's prior knowledge. He adopted the stage name "Rockwell", explaining that he chose it because he believed he "rocked well."

== Career ==
In 1983, Rockwell released his most successful single, "Somebody's Watching Me", with childhood friend Michael Jackson singing the chorus lyrics and Jermaine Jackson singing backing vocals. The song became a RIAA gold-certified #2 song in the US and peaked at #6 in the UK. It held #1 on Billboard's R&B chart for five weeks. Rockwell's second single "Obscene Phone Caller" became Rockwell's only other Top 40 single, reaching #35 on the Billboard Hot 100 chart. After this initial success, Rockwell released two more singles and his debut studio album, Somebody's Watching Me which would peak at #15 on the Billboard 200 and be certified gold by the RIAA in 1984. Rockwell's third single was a cover of The Beatles "Taxman" and peaked at #88 on the UK Charts. The fourth and final single from the album "Knife" failed to chart but gained popularity after initial release.

In 1985, Rockwell released his second studio album Captured. The album spawned three singles. The first of which "He's a Cobra" featured Stevie Wonder and managed to make it to 108 on the Billboard Hot 100. The second single "Peeping Tom" featured on The Last Dragon soundtrack and spawned a music video, with the song peaking at #21 on the Billboard US Dance chart. The third and final single "Tokyo" also failed to chart. The album peaked at #120 on the Billboard 200.

In 1986, Rockwell released his third and final studio album titled The Genie. The album spawned the singles "Carmé" which charted at #46 on the Billboard's R&B chart and "Grow-Up". The album itself only charted on the R&B album chart and saw very little success. After the release of The Genie, Rockwell subsequently left the music industry.

In 2021, "Somebody's Watching Me" re-entered the UK chart, peaking at #47. A deluxe edition of the album Somebody's Watching Me was also released, containing instrumentals and extended mixes as well as a remix of the title track.

== Legal issues ==
On November 29, 2018, Rockwell was arrested in Hollywood for allegedly beating an associate with a chair at the Magic Castle Hotel after she approached him and demanded payment. Rockwell was released from jail on December 1, 2018, on a $30,000 bail. On January 7, 2019, the woman, who suffered multiple injuries from the attack and had undergone surgery to repair a broken arm, filed a lawsuit against Rockwell in Los Angeles for personal injury, claiming damages exceeding $25,000.

== Personal life ==
Rockwell is the son of Berry Gordy. Rockwell's paternal half-sister is actress Rhonda Ross Kendrick, the eldest child of Diana Ross. He is also related to the group LMFAO through his half-brother Redfoo (Stephen Kendal Gordy, son of Berry Gordy and Nancy Leiviska) and his nephew Sky Blu (Skyler Austen Gordy, son of his half-brother Berry Gordy IV and his wife Valerie Robeson).

In July 2010, Rockwell married Nicole Moore. In 2013, he filed for divorce.

Rockwell has also been involved in various charitable organizations over the years, such as the Special Olympics, the American Cancer Society, and the United Negro College Fund.

== Discography ==
=== Studio albums ===
Title	Album details	Peak chart positions					Certifications
Title	Album details	US	US R&B	AUS	CAN	UK	Certifications
Somebody's Watching Me	Release date: January 30, 1984; Label: Motown	15	5	99	34	52	US: Gold
Captured	Release date: January 15, 1985; Label: Motown	120	52	—	—	—	
The Genie	Release date: 1986; Label: Motown	—	59	—	—	—	
"—" denotes a recording that did not chart.

=== Singles ===
Title	Year	Peak chart positions									Certifications	Album
Title	Year	US	US R&B	US Dance	AUS	AUT	CAN	NZ	SWI	UK	Certifications	Album
"Somebody's Watching Me"	1983	2	1	3	12	14	2	5	3	6	US: Gold; UK: Platinum	Somebody's Watching Me
"Obscene Phone Caller"	1984	35	9	—	—	—	—	—	—	79		Somebody's Watching Me
"Taxman"	1984	—	—	—	—	—	—	—	—	88		Somebody's Watching Me
"Knife"	1984	—	—	—	—	—	—	—	—	—		Somebody's Watching Me
"He's a Cobra"	1985	108	65	—	—	—	—	—	—	—		Captured
"Peeping Tom"	1985	—	—	21	—	—	—	—	—	—		Captured
"Tokyo"	1985	—	—	—	—	—	—	—	—	—		Captured
"Carmé"	1986	—	46	—	—	—	—	—	—	—		The Genie
"Grow-Up!"	1986	—	—	—	—	—	—	—	—	—		The Genie
"—" denotes a recording that did not chart.

== Filmography ==
Film
Year	Title	Role
1978	Bloodbrothers	Tyrone
2023	FITUMI: Fake It til U Make It	Man at table

Television
Year	Title	Role	Notes
1971	The Doris Day Show	Himself	Episode: "Whodunnit, Doris"
