= Berry Gordy =

American record executive (born 1929)

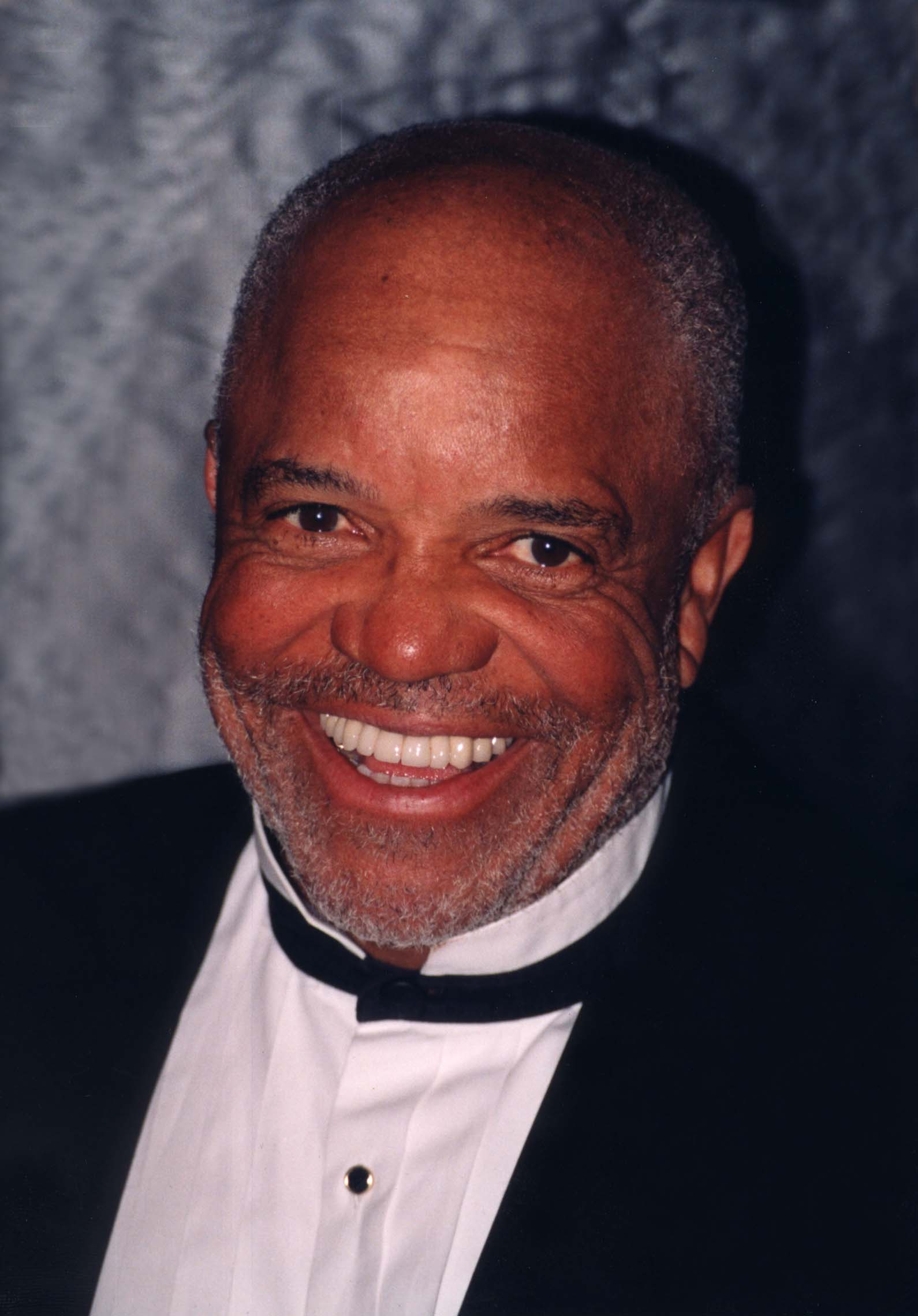
- Gordy in 1998
- Born: Berry Gordy Jr. November 28, 1929 (age 96); Detroit, Michigan, U.S.
- Other name: Berry Gordy III
- Occupations: Record executive; record producer; songwriter; film producer; television producer
- Years active: 1953–2019
- Title: Founder of Motown
- Spouses: Thelma Coleman (m. 1953; div. 1959); Raynoma Mayberry (m. 1960; div. 1964); Grace Eaton (m. 1990; div. 1993)
- Children: 8, including Rhonda, Stefan, Kennedy, and Kerry
- Family: Gordy
- Awards: Full list
- Musical career
- Label: Motown
- Formerly of: The Corporation
- Military service
- Allegiance: United States
- Branch: United States Army
- Service years: 1951–1953
- Units: 58th Field Artillery Battalion, 3d
- Conflicts: Korean War

Berry Gordy Jr. (born November 28, 1929), also known as Berry Gordy III, is an American retired record executive, record producer, songwriter, film producer, and television producer. He is best known as the founder of the Motown record label and its subsidiaries, which was the highest-earning African-American business for decades.

As a songwriter, Gordy composed or co-composed a number of hits including "Money (That's What I Want)", "Lonely Teardrops" and "That's Why" (Jackie Wilson), "Shop Around" (the Miracles), and "Do You Love Me" (the Contours), all of which topped the US R&B charts, as well as the international hit "Reet Petite" (Jackie Wilson). As part of The Corporation, he wrote many hit songs for the Jackson 5, including "I Want You Back" and "ABC".

As a record producer, he launched the Miracles and signed acts like the Supremes, Marvin Gaye, the Temptations, the Four Tops, Gladys Knight & the Pips, and Stevie Wonder. He was known for carefully directing the public image, dress, manners, and choreography of his acts.

Gordy was inducted into the Rock and Roll Hall of Fame in 1988, awarded the National Medal of Arts by President Barack Obama in 2016, and the Kennedy Center Honors in 2021. In 2022, he was inducted into the Black Music & Entertainment Walk of Fame.

== Early years ==
Berry Gordy Jr. was born on November 28, 1929, in Detroit, the seventh of the eight children of Berry Gordy Sr. (also known as "Pop") from the Gordy family and Bertha Fuller Gordy, who had relocated to Detroit from Oconee, Georgia, in 1922 as a part of the Great Migration.

His paternal grandfather, named Berry Gordy, was the son of James Thomas Gordy, a white plantation owner in Georgia, and one of his slaves. Berry Sr.'s half-brother, James Jackson Gordy (son of the elder James and his legal wife), was the grandfather of President Jimmy Carter. Berry Gordy Jr. was led to Detroit both by the job opportunities offered by the booming automotive businesses, and also by worries over the atmosphere in the American South, where the black community was the target of rampant, racial attacks by the Ku Klux Klan.

Gordy's father opened a grocery store, owned a plastering and carpentry business, and a printing shop. While his brothers Fuller and George were happy to work at jobs their father assigned to them in construction and printing, Gordy and his brother Robert were less inclined to follow that path; both liked dancing and music, but Gordy's greatest interest was in boxing.

Gordy dropped out of Northeastern High School in the eleventh grade to become a professional boxer in hopes of becoming rich quickly; he boxed professionally until 1950, when he was drafted by the United States Army in 1951 for service in the Korean War. Arriving in Korea in May 1952, Gordy was first assigned to the 58th Field Artillery Battalion, 3rd Infantry Division, near Panmunjom. He later became a chaplain's assistant, driving a jeep and playing the organ at religious services at the front. His tour in the Korean War was completed in April 1953. He obtained a GED, which is equivalent to a high school diploma.

After his return from Korea in 1953, he married 19-year-old Thelma Louise Coleman in Toledo, Ohio. Gordy developed his interest in music by writing songs and opening the 3-D Record Mart, a record store featuring jazz music and 3-D glasses. The store was unsuccessful, and Gordy sought work at the Lincoln-Mercury plant, but his family connections put him in touch with Al Green (no relation to the singer Reverend Al Green), owner of the Flame Show Bar Talent Club, where he met the singer Jackie Wilson.

In 1957, Wilson recorded "Reet Petite", a song Gordy had co-written with his sister Gwen and writer-producer Billy Davis. It became a modest hit, but had more success internationally, especially in the UK, where it reached the Top 10 and even later topped the chart on re-issue in 1986. Wilson recorded six more songs co-written by Gordy over the next two years, including "Lonely Teardrops", which topped the R&B charts and got to number 7 in the pop chart. The Gordy siblings and Davis also wrote "All I Could Do Was Cry" for Etta James at Chess Records.

== Motown Record Corporation ==
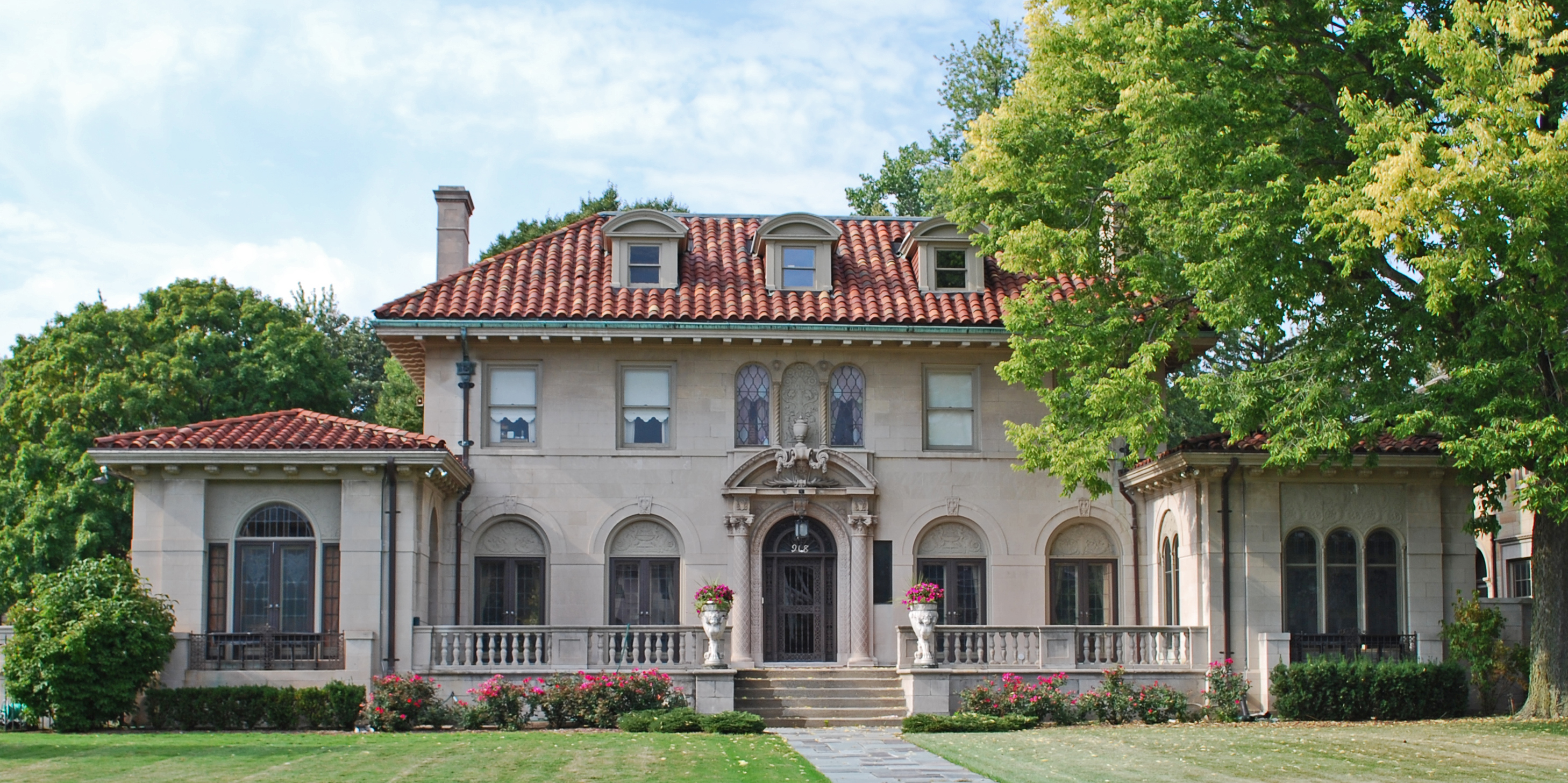
Berry Gordy House, known as the Motown mansion, in Detroit's Boston-Edison Historic District.

Gordy reinvested the profits from his songwriting success into producing. In 1957, he discovered the Miracles (originally known as the Matadors) and began building a portfolio of successful artists. In 1959, with the encouragement of Miracles leader Smokey Robinson, Gordy borrowed $800 (equivalent to $8,835.6 in 2025) from his family to create an R&B record company. Originally, Gordy wanted to name the new label Tammy Records, after the song recorded by Debbie Reynolds. That name was taken, and he chose the name Tamla Records. The company began operating on January 12, 1959.

"Come to Me" by Marv Johnson was issued as Tamla 101. United Artists Records picked up "Come to Me" for national distribution, as well as Johnson's more successful follow-up records such as "You Got What It Takes", co-produced by Gordy, who also received a co-writer credit, though the song was originally written and recorded by guitarist Bobby Parker for Vee-Jay Records a year and a half earlier.

Gordy's next release was the only 45 ever issued on his Rayber label, featuring Wade Jones with an unnamed female backup group. The record did not sell well and is now one of the rarest issues from the Motown stable. Berry's third release was "Bad Girl" by the Miracles, the first release on the Motown record label. "Bad Girl" was a solid hit in 1959 after Chess Records picked it up. Barrett Strong's "Money (That's What I Want)" initially appeared on Tamla and then charted on Gordy's sister's label, Anna Records, in February 1960.

The Miracles who gave the label its first million-selling hit single, with the 1960 Grammy Hall of Fame smash, "Shop Around" and this song, and its follow up hits, "You've Really Got a Hold on Me" (another Grammy Hall of Fame-inducted hit), "Mickey's Monkey","What's So Good About Goodbye", and "I'll Try Something New", made the Miracles the label's first stars.

The Tamla and Motown labels were then merged into a new company, Motown Record Corporation, incorporated on April 14, 1960. In 1960, Gordy signed an unknown singer, Mary Wells, who became the fledgling label's second star, with Smokey Robinson penning her hits "You Beat Me to the Punch", "Two Lovers", and "My Guy". The Miracles' hit "Shop Around" peaked at No. 1 on the national R&B charts in late 1960 and at No. 2 on the Billboard magazine pop charts on January 16, 1961 (No. 1 pop, Cash Box), which established Motown as an independent company worthy of notice. Later in 1961, the Marvelettes' "Please Mr. Postman" made it to the top of both charts.

Gordy's gift for identifying and bringing together musical talent, along with the careful management of his artists' public image, made Motown a major national and then international success. Over the next decade, he signed such artists as the Supremes, Marvin Gaye, the Temptations, Jimmy Ruffin, the Contours, the Four Tops, Gladys Knight & the Pips, the Commodores, the Velvelettes, Martha and the Vandellas, Stevie Wonder, and the Jackson 5. Though he also signed some white acts to the label, such as Rare Earth and Rustix, via the Rare Earth label, Gordy mainly promoted African-American artists, but carefully controlled their public image, dress, manners, and choreography for across-the-board appeal.

Gordy announced his retirement in 2019 at the age of 89.

== Relocation to Los Angeles ==
In 1972, Gordy relocated to Los Angeles, where he produced the commercially successful biographical drama film on Billie Holiday, Lady Sings the Blues, starring Diana Ross (who was nominated for an Academy Award), Richard Pryor, and Billy Dee Williams (cast in a role originally intended for Levi Stubbs of the Four Tops). Initially the studio, over Gordy's objections, rejected Williams after several screen tests. Gordy, known for his tenacity, eventually prevailed, and the film established Williams as a major movie star.

Gordy soon after produced and directed Mahogany, also starring Ross and Williams. Tony Richardson was the original director, but Gordy fired Richardson and took over direction himself after a dispute over minor casting. In 1985, he produced the cult martial arts film The Last Dragon, which starred martial artist Taimak and one of Prince's proteges, Vanity.

Although Motown continued to produce major hits throughout the 1970s and 1980s by artists including Jermaine Jackson, Rick James, Commodores, Lionel Richie, and long-term signings Stevie Wonder and Smokey Robinson, the record company was no longer the major force it had been. Gordy sold his interests in Motown Records to MCA and Boston Ventures on June 28, 1988, for $61 million (equivalent to $143,050,000 in 2025). He later sold most of his interests in Jobete publishing to EMI Publishing. Gordy wrote or co-wrote 240 of the approximately 15,000 songs in Motown's Jobete music catalogue. The true test of the label's worth came a few years later, when Polygram paid over $330 million for the Motown catalog. Diana Ross was given shares in this version of the label.

Gordy published an autobiography, To Be Loved, in 1994.

== Awards and accolades ==
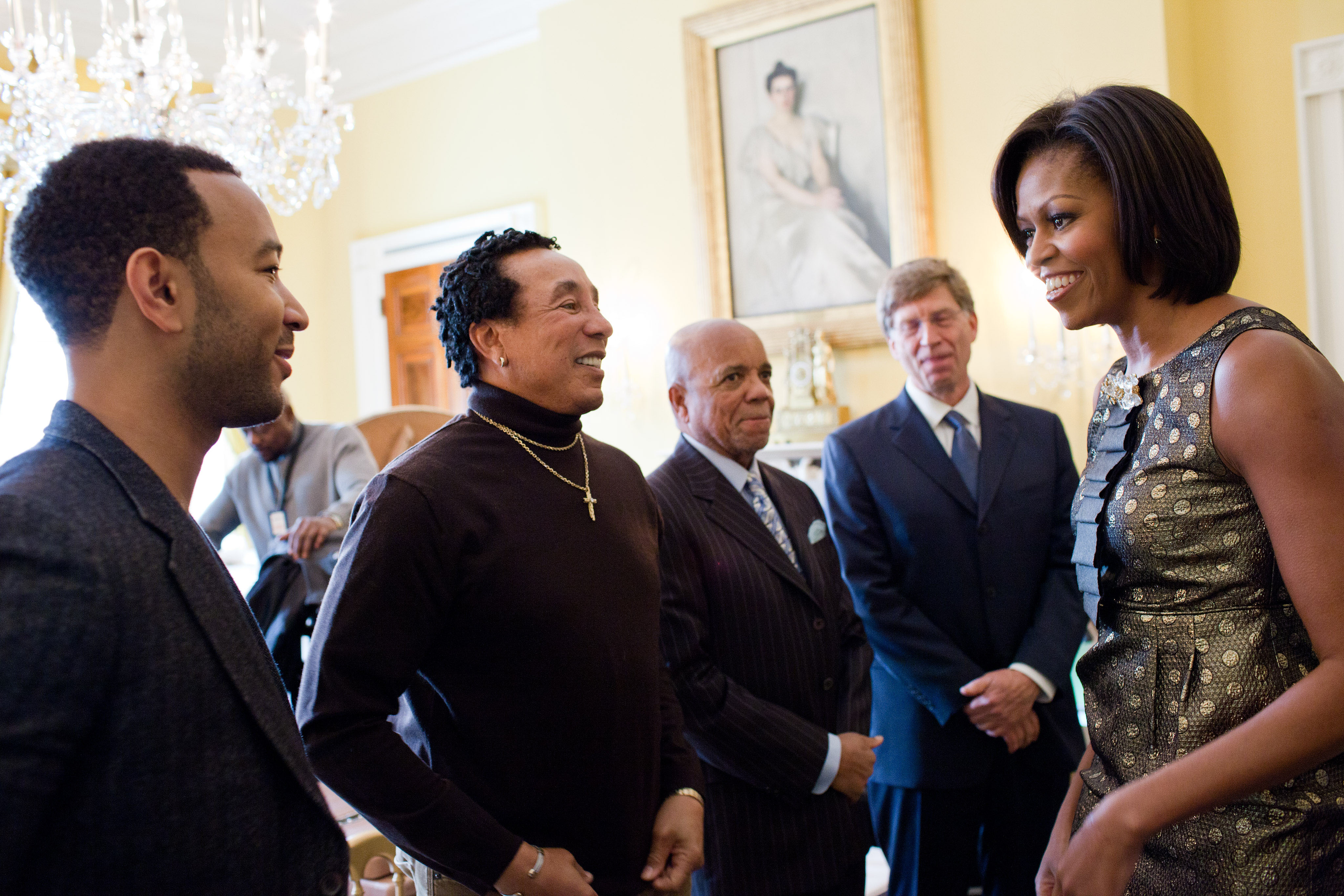
Berry Gordy with John Legend, Smokey Robinson, and First Lady Michelle Obama at the White House in 2011.

Gordy was inducted into the Rock and Roll Hall of Fame in 1988. In 1993, he received the CBC Lifetime Achievement Award. He was inducted into the Junior Achievement U.S. Business Hall of Fame in 1998 and the Michigan Rock and Roll Legends Hall of Fame in 2009.

When Gordy received the Songwriters Hall of Fame's Pioneer Award on June 13, 2013, he was the first living individual to receive the honor.

In 2014, Gordy received the key to the city from Mayor of Detroit Mike Duggan on October 22, 2014.

In 2016, Gordy received the National Medal of Arts from President Obama for "helping to create a trailblazing new sound in American music. As a record producer and songwriter, he helped build Motown, launching the music careers of countless legendary artists. His unique sound helped shape our Nation's story."

Berry Gordy Square in Los Angeles was designated by the City Council at intersection of Sunset Boulevard and Argyle where the office of Motown was located.

In 2021, he was awarded the Kennedy Center Honors alongside Bette Midler, Joni Mitchell, Justino Díaz, and Lorne Michaels.

In 2022, he was inducted into the Black Music & Entertainment Walk of Fame.

In 2022, he was awarded an honorary doctorate from the University of Michigan.

== Statements about Motown artists ==
Following the funeral of Marvin Gaye on April 5, 1984, Gordy declared Gaye "the greatest of his time". Gordy said that the singer "had no musical equals", while also discussing how he carried on the legacy of other soul singers who tackled a range of themes, from love to civil rights, such as Billie Holiday.

On March 20, 2009, Gordy was in Hollywood to pay tribute to his first group and first million-selling act, the Miracles, when the members received a star on the Hollywood Walk of Fame. Speaking in tribute to the group, Gordy said: "Without the Miracles, Motown would not be the Motown it is today".

Gordy spoke at the memorial service for Michael Jackson in Los Angeles on July 7, 2009. He suggested that "The King of Pop" was perhaps not the best description for Jackson in light of his achievements, referring to him instead as "the greatest entertainer that ever lived".

== Motown: The Musical ==
On May 15, 2011, it was announced that Gordy was developing a Broadway musical about Motown. The show is said to be an account of events of the 1960s and how they shaped the creation of the label. Gordy hoped that the musical would improve the reputation of Motown Records and clear up any misconceptions regarding the label's demise.

Motown: The Musical began previews at the Lunt-Fontanne Theatre on March 11, 2013, and began regular performances there on April 14. The musical closed in January 2015.

The UK version of Motown: The Musical opened in London's West End in January 2016. Berry Gordy was present at the opening night.

== Personal life ==
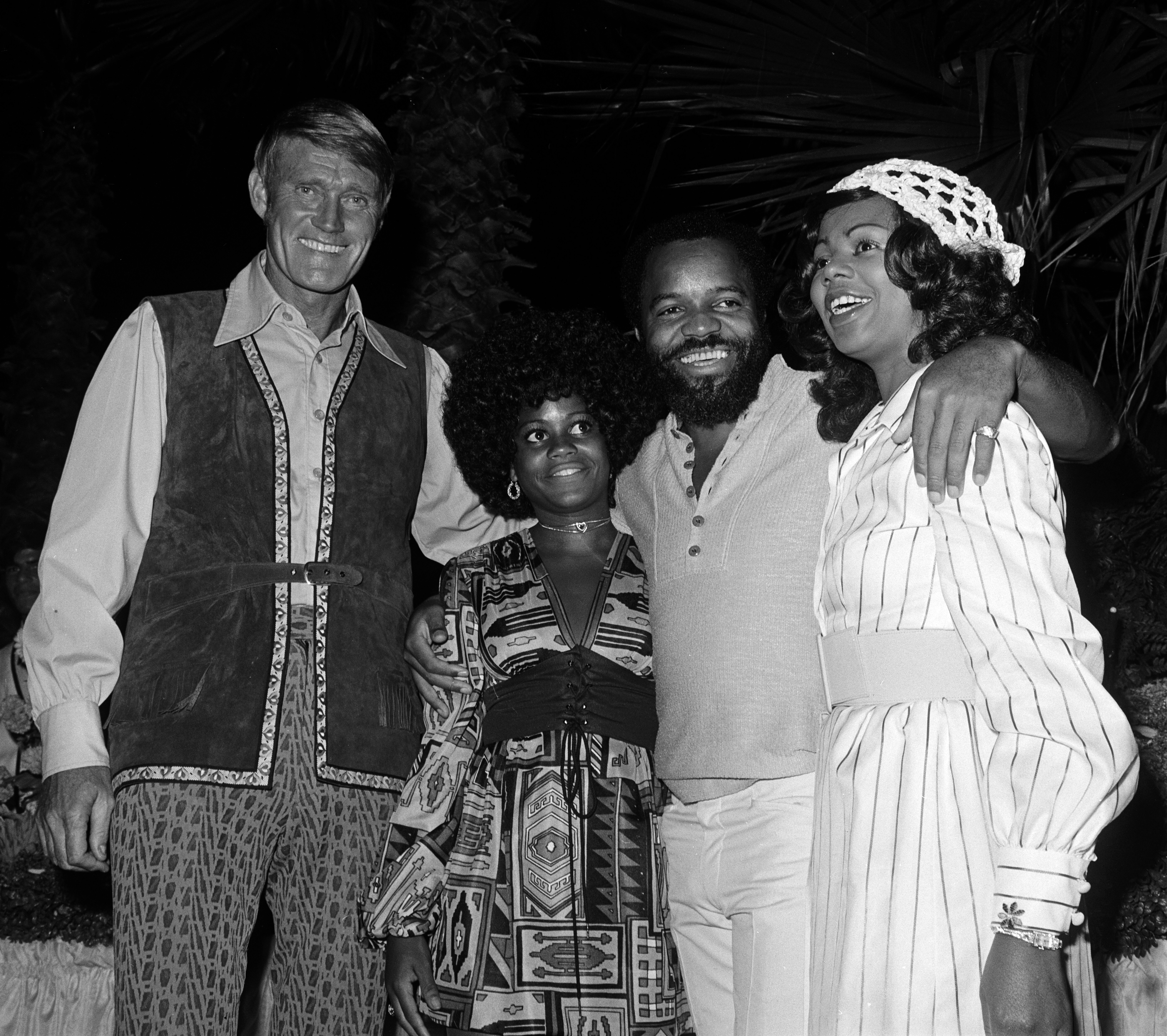
Berry Gordy celebrating his daughter Hazel Joy's birthday in 1971, with Chuck Connors in attendance

Gordy, who was married and divorced three times, has eight children with six different women. His publishing company, Jobete, was named after his three eldest children: Joy, Berry, and Terry.

He had three children with his first wife, Thelma Coleman, who he married in 1953. They divorced in 1959:

- Hazel Joy Gordy (born August 24, 1954), was once married to Jermaine Jackson
- Berry Gordy IV (born October 1955), father to Skyler Austen Gordy
- Terry James Gordy (born August 1956)

In the spring of 1960, he married Raynoma Mayberry Liles. They divorced in 1964. They had one son:

- Kerry Gordy (born June 25, 1959)

With Jeana Jackson, Gordy had one daughter:

- Sherry Gordy (born May 23, 1963)

With his then-mistress Margaret Norton, Gordy had a son:

- Kennedy William Gordy (born March 15, 1964); would later become known as the Motown musician Rockwell

Gordy had a daughter with Motown artist Diana Ross, with whom he had an intimate relationship from 1965 to 1970:

- Rhonda Suzanne Silberstein (born August 14, 1971)

Gordy's eighth and youngest child is a son born to Nancy Leiviska:

- Stefan Kendal Gordy (born September 3, 1975); he is known by his stage name, Redfoo, as one member of the duo LMFAO. The other member is Skyler Gordy, born August 23, 1986, known professionally as SkyBlu. He is a grandson of Gordy and Thelma Coleman through their son Berry IV and his wife, Valerie Robeson.

Gordy married Grace Eaton on July 17, 1990, and divorced in 1993.

He is a second cousin of US president Jimmy Carter. His relation to Carter stems from their white great-grandfather James Thomas Gordy who owned a black female slave named Esther Johnson.

A sexual assault lawsuit filed against Jermaine Jackson in December 2023 by Rita Barrett, who was the wife of Gordy's friend Ben Barrett, alleged Gordy assisted in covering up Jackson's sexual assault of her in 1988.

== Vistas Stables ==
Gordy owned the colt Powis Castle, whom he raced under the nom de course Vistas Stables. Racing in California, Powis Castle won the 1994 Oceanside Stakes and Malibu Stakes, then finished eighth in the Kentucky Derby and ninth in the Preakness Stakes, the first two legs of the U.S. Triple Crown series.

== Film ==
Year	Title	Notes
1972	Lady Sings the Blues	Producer
1975	Mahogany	Producer and director
1976	The Bingo Long Traveling All-Stars & Motor Kings	Producer
1985	The Last Dragon	Producer and music supervisor

=== Broadway ===
Year	Title	Notes
1982	Rock 'N Roll! The First 5,000 Years	Writer: "I'll Be There"
2005	Lennon	Writer: "Money (That's What I Want)"
2013	Motown: The Musical	Producer and writer, composer and lyricist

== In popular culture ==
- Gordy was portrayed by Billy Dee Williams, whose career Gordy had helped to jump-start in the 1970s, in the 1992 miniseries The Jacksons: An American Dream.
- Gordy was portrayed by Obba Babatunde in the 1998 miniseries The Temptations. He also plays a key role in Ain't Too Proud, which told the story of The Temptations in a musical format.
- The character Gordy Berry, also played by Babatunde, in The Fresh Prince of Bel-Air is a reference to Berry Gordy.
- The character of Curtis Taylor Jr., played by Jamie Foxx, a music executive in the 2006 musical film Dreamgirls, has been described as "appeared to be patterned after him". The film was based on the 1981 musical Dreamgirls, but the film made the connection to Gordy and Motown much more explicit than the musical did, by, among other things, moving the setting of the story from Chicago to Detroit. Taylor appears in the film as unethical and insensitive to his artists, which caused Gordy and others to criticize the film after its release. Gordy called the portrayal "100% wrong", while Smokey Robinson said that it "blatantly painted a negative picture of Motown and Berry Gordy and of the Supremes".
- Gordy was portrayed by Brandon Victor Dixon in the 2013 stage play production Motown: The Musical
- In the 2026 biographical film Michael, Gordy was portrayed by Larenz Tate.

== See also ==
- Album era
- List of songs written by Berry Gordy
