= The Gap Band discography =

- Studio albums: 14
- Live albums: 2
- Compilation albums: 13
- Singles: 39
- Top-40 R&B songs: 23

The Gap Band has released over 30 albums. Since their inception in 1967, the Gap Band has released 14 studio albums, 12 compilation albums and 2 live albums. They released nine self-titled albums (including two of the same name). Each album does not reflect which number they released, only which point it is in the series (Gap Band IV, for example, is actually their sixth album).

== Albums ==
=== Studio albums ===
Year	Album	Peak chart positions						Certifications (sales thresholds)	Record label
Year	Album	US Pop	US R&B	GER	NLD	NZ	UK Pop	Certifications (sales thresholds)	Record label
1974	Magicians Holiday	—	—	—	—	—	—	—	Shelter
1977	The Gap Band	—	—	—	—	—	—	—	Tattoo
1979	The Gap Band	77	10	—	—	—	—	—	Mercury
1979	The Gap Band II	42	3	—	32	—	—	US: Gold	Mercury
1980	The Gap Band III	16	1	—	—	—	—	US: Platinum	Mercury
1982	Gap Band IV	14	1	—	—	46	—	US: Platinum	Total Experience
1983	Gap Band V: Jammin'	28	2	—	—	—	—	US: Gold	Total Experience
1984	Gap Band VI	58	1	—	—	—	—	—	Total Experience
1985	Gap Band VII	159	6	—	—	—	—	—	Total Experience
1986	Gap Band 8	—	29	65	—	—	47	—	Total Experience
1988	Straight from the Heart	—	74	—	—	—	—	—	Total Experience
1989	Round Trip	189	20	—	—	—	—	—	Capitol
1995	Ain't Nothin' But a Party	—	—	—	—	—	—	—	Raging Bull
1999	Y2K:Funkin' Till 2000 Comz	—	—	—	—	—	—	—	Eagle
"—" denotes releases that did not chart or were not released in that territory.

=== Live albums ===
Year	Album	Peak chart positions	Record label
Year	Album	US R&B	Record label
1996	Live & Well	54	Intersound
1998	Gotta Get Up	—	EMI-Capitol

=== Compilation albums ===
Year	Album	Peak chart positions		Certifications (sales thresholds)	Record label
Year	Album	US	US R&B	Certifications (sales thresholds)	Record label
1985	Gap Gold: The Best of The Gap Band	103	46	US: Platinum	Total Experience
1986	The 12" Collection	—	61	—	Mercury
1995	The Best of The Gap Band	—	—	—	Mercury
1998	Greatest Hits	—	—	—	PolyGram
1998	The Ballads Collection	—	—	—	PolyGram
1998	The Best of the Gap Band, Vol. 2	—	—	—	Simitar
1999	12" Collection & More	—	—	—	PolyGram
2000	The Millennium Collection: The Best of Gap Band	—	—	—	Mercury
2001	Ultimate Collection	—	—	—	Hip-O
2001	Love at Your Fingertips	—	—	—	Ark 21
2003	The Best of the Gap Band '84-'88	—	—	—	Varèse Sarabande
2006	Gold	—	—	—	Hip-O
2009	Playlist: Your Way	—	70	—	Mercury
2011	Icon	—	—	—	Mercury
"—" denotes releases that did not chart or were not released in that territory.

== Singles ==
Year	Single	Peak chart positions				Certifications	Album
Year	Single	US Pop	US R&B	US Dance	UK Pop	Certifications	Album
1974	"Backbone"	—	—	—	—		Magicians Holiday
1974	"I-Yike-It"	—	—	—	—		Magicians Holiday
1977	"Out of the Blue (Can You Feel It)"	—	42	—	—		The Gap Band (1977)
1977	"Little Bit of Love"	—	95	—	—		The Gap Band (1977)
1979	"Shake"	101	4	48	—		The Gap Band (1979)
1979	"Open Up Your Mind (Wide)"	—	13	—	—		The Gap Band (1979)
1979	"Steppin' (Out)"	103	10	—	—		The Gap Band II
1980	"Oops Up Side Your Head"	102	4	52	6	BPI: Silver	The Gap Band II
1980	"Party Lights"	—	36	—	30		The Gap Band II
1980	"Burn Rubber on Me (Why You Wanna Hurt Me)"	84	1	19	22		The Gap Band III
1981	"Humpin'"	—	60	19	36		The Gap Band III
1981	"Yearning for Your Love"	60	5	—	47		The Gap Band III
1982	"Early in the Morning"	24	1	13	55		Gap Band IV
1982	"You Dropped a Bomb on Me"	31	2	39	—		Gap Band IV
1982	"Outstanding"	51	1	24	68		Gap Band IV
1983	"Party Train"	101	3	—	—		Gap Band V: Jammin'
1983	"Jam the Motha"	—	16	—	—		Gap Band V: Jammin'
1984	"Someday"	—	—	—	17		Gap Band V: Jammin'
1984	"I'm Ready (If You're Ready)"	—	74	—	87		Gap Band V: Jammin'
1984	"Jammin' in America"	—	—	—	64		Gap Band V: Jammin'
1984	"Beep a Freak"	103	2	66	—		Gap Band VI
1985	"I Found My Baby"	—	8	—	—		Gap Band VI
1985	"Disrespect"	—	18	—	—		Gap Band VI
1985	"Desire"	—	46	—	—		Gap Band VII
1986	"Going in Circles"	—	2	—	—		Gap Band VII
1986	"Automatic Brain"	—	78	—	—		Gap Band VII
1986	"Big Fun"	—	8	—	4		Gap Band 8
1987	"How Music Came About"	—	—	—	61		Gap Band 8
1987	"Zibble, Zibble (Get the Money) (AKA: Get Loose, Get Funky)"	—	15	—	—		Gap Band 8
1987	"Sweeter Than Candy"	—	40	—	—		Straight from the Heart
1987	"Oops Upside Your Head" ('87 Mix)	—	—	—	20		Non-album single
1988	"Straight from the Heart"	—	36	—	—		Straight from the Heart
1988	"I'm Gonna Git You Sucka"	—	14	35	63		I'm Gonna Git You Sucka: Original Soundtrack Album
1989	"All of My Love"	—	1	—	88		Round Trip
1990	"Addicted to Your Love"	—	8	—	—		Round Trip
1990	"We Can Make It Alright"	—	18	—	—		Round Trip
1995	"First Lover"	—	59	36	—		Ain't Nothin' But a Party
1995	"Got It Goin' On"	—	75	—	—		Ain't Nothin' But a Party
1999	"Good Old Fashioned Lovin"	—	104	—	—		Y2K:Funkin' Till 2000 Comz
2004	"Oops Upside Your Head" (with DJ Casper)	—	—	—	16		Non-album single
"—" denotes releases that did not chart or were not released in that territory.

== See also ==
- Charlie Wilson discography
