= The Best of Gap Band =

The Best of The Gap Band

Compilation album by The Gap Band
- Released: 1995
- Genre: R&B; Funk; Soul
- Length: 1:17:26
- Label: Mercury

The Gap Band chronology
| Ain't Nothin' But a Party (1995) | The Best of The Gap Band (1995) | Live & Well (1996) |

Professional ratings
Review scores
| Source | Rating |
|---|---|
| AllMusic | 4.5/5 stars |

The Best of The Gap Band is the 16th album released in 1995 on Mercury. The album includes the most popular hits of the band.

== Track listing ==
| No. | Title | Writer(s) | Originally from | Length |
|---|---|---|---|---|
| 1. | "Early in the Morning" | Charlie Wilson, Lonnie Simmons, Rudy Taylor | Gap Band IV (1982) | 7:35 |
| 2. | "Shake" | Charlie Wilson | The Gap Band (1979) | 4:59 |
| 3. | "Outstanding" | Raymond Calhoun | Gap Band IV (1982) | 6:13 |
| 4. | "Burn Rubber on Me (Why You Wanna Hurt Me)" | Charlie Wilson, Lonnie Simmons, Rudy Taylor | The Gap Band III (1980) | 5:33 |
| 5. | "Yearning for Your Love" | Ronnie Wilson, Oliver Scott | The Gap Band III (1980) | 5:46 |
| 6. | "Open Up Your Mind (Wide)" | Charlie Wilson, Ronnie Wilson | The Gap Band (1979) | 7:08 |
| 7. | "You Dropped a Bomb on Me" | Charlie Wilson, Lonnie Simmons, Rudy Taylor | Gap Band IV (1982) | 5:11 |
| 8. | "You Can Count On Me" | Charlie Wilson, Buddy Jones | The Gap Band (1979) | 5:01 |
| 9. | "I Don't Believe You Want To Get Up And Dance (Oops Upside Your Head)" | Charlie Wilson, Lonnie Simmons, Rudy Taylor, Robert Wilson, Ronnie Wilson | The Gap Band II (1979) | 8:41 |
| 10. | "Steppin' (Out)" | Charlie Wilson, Lonnie Simmons, Ronnie Wilson | The Gap Band II (1979) | 4:25 |
| 11. | "Humpin'" | Charlie Wilson, Lonnie Simmons, Rudy Taylor | The Gap Band III (1980) | 5:15 |
| 12. | "The Boys Are Back In Town" | Charlie Wilson, Lonnie Simmons, Malvin Dino Vice | The Gap Band II (1979) | 5:47 |
| 13. | "Party Train" | Charlie Wilson, Lonnie Simmons, Rudy Taylor, Ronnie Wilson | Gap Band V: Jammin' (1983) | 5:42 |
| Total length: | | | | 1:17:26 |
