= Live & Well (Gap Band album) =

Live and Well

Live album by The Gap Band
- Released: 1996
- Recorded: 1996
- Genre: R&B, funk
- Length: 69:26
- Label: Intersound Records; Delta Music GMBH
- Producer: Lonnie Simmons

The Gap Band chronology
Ain't Nothin' But a Party (1995)	Live and Well (1996)	Gotta Get Up (1998)

Professional ratings
Review scores
Source	Rating
Allmusic	link

Live & Well is a live album by The Gap Band, released in 1996. The songs "Gotta Get Up" and "Drop the Bomb" are both special live versions of "Early in the Morning" and "You Dropped a Bomb on Me" with similar instrumentations but modified lyrics.

== Track listing ==
#	Title	Writers	Length
1.	Intro	Oliver Scott	0:51
2.	Gap Band Party	Anthony "Baby Gap" Walker/Charlie Wilson/Robert Wilson/Val Young	1:52
3.	Wide	Charlie Wilson/Robert Wilson/Ronnie Wilson	0:48
4.	Oops Up Side Your Head	Charlie Wilson/Robert Wilson/Ronnie Wilson/Rudy Taylor/Lonnie Simmons	5:09
5.	Outstanding	Raymond Calhoun	5:34
6.	Humpin'	Charlie Wilson/Lonnie Simmons/Ronnie Wilson/Rudy Taylor	3:31
7.	No Hiding Place	Charlie Wilson/Ronnie Wilson/Lonnie Simmons	3:47
8.	Burn Rubber (Why You Wanna Hurt Me)	Charlie Wilson/Lonnie Simmons/Rudy Taylor	6:09
9.	Gotta Get Up	Ira Gilroy/Robert Wilson/Ronnie Wilson	1:49
10.	Early in the Morning	Charlie Wilson/Lonnie Simmons/L.R. Taylor Jr.	6:29
11.	Party Train	Charlie Wilson/Ronnie Wilson/Rudy Taylor	7:02
12.	You Dropped A Bomb On Me	Charlie Wilson/Lonnie Simmons/Rudy Taylor	4:50
13.	Yearning for Your Love	Oliver Scott/Ronnie Wilson	8:52
14.	Mega Mix [Gotta Get Up Mix]	Ira Gilroy/Ronnie Wilson	6:41
15.	Messin' With My Flow	Ira Gilroy/K. Paran/Robert Wilson/Ronnie Wilson/Charlie Wilson/W. Starks/A.L. Wilson	4:43
