= Uptown Funk =

2014 single by Mark Ronson featuring Bruno Mars

Single by Mark Ronson featuring Bruno Mars

from the album Uptown Special
- B-side: "Feel Right" (BB Disco Dub Mix)
- Released: 10 November 2014
- Recorded: 2014
- Studio: Various: Royal (Memphis, Tennessee); Zelig Studios (London, UK); Cherry Beach Sound (Toronto); Armoury (Vancouver, British Columbia); Levcon Studios (Los Angeles, California); Daptone (Brooklyn, New York)
- Genre: Funk-pop; soul; boogie; disco-pop; Minneapolis sound
- Length: 4:30 (album version); 3:55 (radio edit)
- Label: Columbia; Sony; RCA
- Songwriters: Mark Ronson; Bruno Mars; Philip Lawrence; Jeff Bhasker; Nicholaus Williams; Devon Gallaspy; Charles Wilson; Robert Wilson; Ronnie Wilson; Rudolph Taylor; Lonnie Simmons
- Producers: Mark Ronson; Jeff Bhasker; Bruno Mars

Mark Ronson singles chronology
"Anywhere in the World" (2012)	"Uptown Funk" (2014)	"Daffodils" (2015)

Bruno Mars singles chronology
"Young Girls" (2013)	"Uptown Funk" (2014)	"24K Magic" (2016)

Music video
- "Uptown Funk" on YouTube

"Uptown Funk" is a song by British-American DJ and record producer Mark Ronson featuring American singer Bruno Mars. It was released on 10 November 2014, as the lead single from Ronson's fourth studio album, Uptown Special (2015). "Uptown Funk" was written by Ronson, Mars, Jeff Bhasker and Philip Lawrence; it was produced by the aforementioned first three. The song began during a freestyle studio session while they worked on a jam Mars and his band had been playing on tour. Copyright controversies arose after the song's release resulting in multiple lawsuits and amendments to its songwriting credits.

The song is a funk-pop, soul, boogie, disco-pop and Minneapolis sound track. It has a spirit akin to the 1980s-era funk music. Its lyrics address fashion, self-love and "traditional masculine bravado", performed in a sing-rapping style filled with metaphors, arrogance, charisma and fun. Upon its release, the single received generally positive reviews from critics, who praised the instrumental, style and influences of the track. Others criticized it for not being innovative as it tried to emulate 1980s funk music.

The song topped the charts of 19 countries and reached the top 10 of 15 others, making it the most successful single of Ronson and Mars to date. In the United States, "Uptown Funk" topped the Billboard Hot 100 for fourteen consecutive weeks and spent seven weeks on the top of the UK Singles Chart. It was certified eleven times platinum by the Recording Industry Association of America (RIAA) and eight times platinum by the British Phonographic Industry (BPI). "Uptown Funk" peaked at number one on the Canadian Hot 100, and topped the Irish Singles Chart, taking the Christmas number one spot. The song additionally reached the top spot in France, spending eleven weeks in the number one position. number one in both Australia for a total of six weeks and in New Zealand for nine consecutive weeks. It also broke its own streaming record three times in the United Kingdom, while breaking the streaming record in the United States and Worldwide at that time.

Director Cameron Duddy and Mars shot the song's music video depicting Ronson, Mars and The Hooligans singing, walking and dancing in a city street. As of March 2025, the official music video for "Uptown Funk" is the tenth most viewed YouTube video of all-time, having received over 5.6 billion views. "Uptown Funk" was performed on television shows such as Saturday Night Live, The Ellen DeGeneres Show and the Super Bowl 50 halftime show. It received several awards and nominations, winning British Single of the Year at the 2015 Brit Awards, International Work of the Year at the APRA Music Awards of 2016 and Record of the Year at the 2016 Grammy Awards. The television show soundtrack of Glee, and commercials for L'Oréal's Garnier line and Skippy peanut butter, have used the song. It has been parodied several times and became a worldwide phenomenon with a major impact on pop culture.

== Background ==
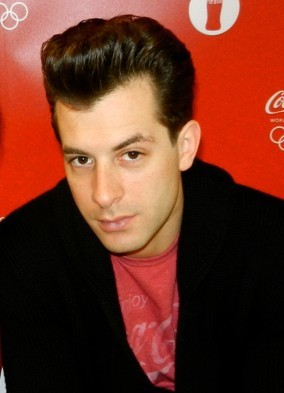
Mark Ronson (pictured) is the lead artist and one of the composers of "Uptown Funk".

After producing three songs for Bruno Mars's second studio album Unorthodox Jukebox (2012), Mark Ronson said in June 2014, that he and Mars planned on working together again. Ronson ended up working on "Uptown Funk" for seven months, recording it in various locations, in a number of grueling, stressful sessions. Its earliest version was a jam that Mars and his band played on tour.

When Ronson joined Jeff Bhasker and Mars for a jam session at the latter's studio, he wanted to finish leftover demos from Unorthodox Jukebox, however, Mars wanted to do something different. He started playing on a drum kit in the studio, while Bhasker and Ronson played keyboard and guitar, respectively. They decided to work on the tour jam and thought it would be "cool" to fit in the Trinidad James song, "All Gold Everything", played during the tour's soundcheck. At this point, they found the opening line: "This hit, that ice cold/Michelle Pfeiffer, that white gold", which led them to believe they had an "exciting idea". However, both Ronson and Mars had busy schedules and could not complete the single. They spent the next several months working on it, fighting over which sections would fit better. Mars was not a fan of early versions of the song.

The trio recorded the song in Los Angeles, London, Memphis, New York, Toronto, and Vancouver. The horn parts were recorded at Daptone Records in Brooklyn with the horn sections of The Dap-Kings, Antibalas and The Hooligans playing the final version of the track. The drum section was first recorded at a studio owned by Mars in Los Angeles, and later rearranged in Memphis. The track took over 100 takes before it was finished at Ronson's studio in London. There were a number of drastic changes made to the track. One iteration featured a hard rock breakdown in the middle and a chorus in which Mars shouted, "Burn this motherfucker down!" At one point, the song was nearly scrapped entirely. They spent months working on a chorus, only to decide not to use it. Ronson said the compositions of American band Kool & the Gang influenced them to only use a "horn line" as the chorus. After a show on the Moonshine Jungle Tour (2013–14), American songwriter Philip Lawrence suggested using an opening bassline; however, as he did not play bass himself, Canadian recording engineer Charles Moniz asked him to sing it. The "doh" vocal bassline ended up on the album. Some parts of the track were done in improvised studios set up by Moniz.

The stress over "Uptown Funk" was so high that Ronson passed out during one session trying to perfect the guitar part. Two days later in Toronto they figured out the guitar part when Ronson was playing it in front of The Hooligans after 82 takes. Ronson explained on NPR's Fresh Air why he was so determined to make the song perfect: "When you're doing something that doesn't sound like anything else on the radio at the time, you almost need to like, iron-clad it, to make sure it gets through. You have to put these hooks in it. You've got to make sure you've got all that ear candy in it to get it through the gate."

The record label was hesitant to release the song under the title "Uptown Funk" suggesting the alternative "Just Watch". In October 2014, Mike Mullaney, an assistant program director at CBS Radio/WBMX, listened to the song after it was sent for testing and called it "the greatest song of all time" in a tweet. He added, "The Ronson/Bruno tune is like JamesBrown/RickJames/TheTime jamming w/ badass brass band", describing it as "Filthy, funky" and added, "Bruno simply wails". Ronson feels that the song belongs more to Mars than himself.

== Production and release ==
"Uptown Funk" was initially written by Ronson, Mars, Lawrence, and Bhasker. Since the song embodies some of "All Gold Everything" (2012), Trinidad James and Devon Gallaspy were credited as a songwriters. In May 2015, the track was re-registered as it also contains portions of The Gap Band's "Oops Up Side Your Head" (1979). Additional writing credit was given to Charlie Wilson, Robert Wilson, Ronnie Wilson, Rudy Taylor, and Lonnie Simmons. The single was produced by Ronson, Bhasker, and Mars. Ronson was in charge of the guitars, LinnDrum and programming, while the keyboards and talk box were handled by Bhasker. Mars sang the vocals and played drums. Ronson and several others engineered the song. The track was recorded at six studios. Serban Ghenea and John Hanes, who served as the mix engineer, mixed "Uptown Funk" at MixStar Studios in Virginia Beach. It was mastered by Tom Coyne at Sterling Sound, NYC.

On 30 October 2014, Ronson announced, via Twitter, the release of "Uptown Funk". The date 10 November 2014 appeared on the poster image Ronson included in the tweet. Columbia Records and Sony Music Entertainment released the single on 10 November 2014 for digital download in various countries. RCA Records sent the track to be added to US contemporary hit radio the following day, while Sony issued the track for radio airplay in Italy on 14 November 2014. In the United Kingdom, "Uptown Funk" was released before its scheduled date, 11 January 2015, because it had been performed earlier on The X Factor as a cover by Fleur East. On 8 December 2014 the song released on the UK via digital download and radio stations began adding the track to their playlists. On 9 January 2015, a CD Single was released in Austria, Germany and Switzerland. It included the album version of "Uptown Funk" and Ronson's "Feel Right" featuring Mystikal. On 16 and 24 February 2015, the recording and one of its remixes, the BB Disco Dub Mix by Benji B, were released on vinyl in the UK and the US. An EP of four different remixes of the original version of the song was released via digital download on 13 April 2015. On 29 June 2015, a remix featuring Trinidad James was made available for purchase. On 18 July 2018, the radio edition of the track was available for sale. The song was also included on Mars's compilation album, Collaborations (2026).

== Composition and influences ==
"Uptown Funk"
A 27-second sample, in which Mars sings the pre-chorus of "Uptown Funk".

"Uptown Funk" has been described as a funk-pop, soul, boogie, disco-pop,Minneapolis sound track, with a light EDM influence. Written in the key of D Dorian, it has a tempo of 115 beats per minute, with vocals ranging from B_{2} to D_{6}. It has been described as a "joyous, energetic and feel-good" song. The Guardian's music critic noted influences of Cameo, Earth, Wind & Fire, Chaka Khan, New Edition, Prince, Sugarhill Gang and The Gap Band. Billboard's music critic compared the song to George Kranz's "Trommeltanz (Din Daa Daa)" (1983), Earth, Wind & Fire's "Getaway" (1976), One Way's "Cutie Pie" (1982), Sugarhill Gang's "Apache" (1981), The Gap Band's "Oops Up Side Your Head" (1979) and "Early in the Morning" (1982), The Sequence's "Funk You Up" (1979), Morris Day & The Time's "Cool" (1981) and "Jungle Love" (1984), as well as, Zapp's "More Bounce to the Ounce" (1980). Matt James of PopMatters felt Morris Day & The Time's "The Bird" (1984), Kool & the Gang's "Get Down on It" (1981) and Was (Not Was)' "Walk the Dinosaur" (1987) to have influenced "Uptown Funk". Various critics noticed the pastiche on "Uptown Funk", from the "electric purple texture of the synths and the loose slap of the rhythms" to the "Prince-backed 80's...Morris Day & The Time".

Jamieson Cox of Time, Chris Molanphy of Slate and Stuart Berman of Pitchfork found the song heavily influenced by 1980s funk. Neil McCormick writing for The Telegraph called it an "evocation of the kind of Eighties funk that was already ripe with nostalgia". Robbie Daw of Idolator found the single closer to the "70's groove", filling "the hearts of Stax- and James Brown music fans". Likewise, Rap-Up dubbed it a "70's jam", a mash-up of "the best of Morris Day & The Time, James Brown, and The Jackson 5". AXS's Lucas Villa compared the funk sound of the recording to George Clinton's "Atomic Dog" (1982). Andy Kellman's AllMusic said the recording "aimed for early Time", but it sounded more like One Way's "Let's Talk"(1985). Annie Galvin of Slant Magazine found Mars "channeling Little Richard's raspier inflections." Critics noticed the influence of Cameo on the horns, Morris Day & The Time on the keyboards, and "Party Train" (1983) by The Gap Band on the drums. The song is performed in a more arrogant and charismatic way than previous tracks by Mars. The lyrics have "well-placed references to Michelle Pfeiffer and Trinidad James", as the hook samples portions of James's "All Gold Everything" (2012). Mars shows not only "soul and swagger" in the sing-rapping verses, "I'm too hot / Call the police and the fireman", but he also jokes around, "Got Chucks on / With Saint Laurent / Gotta kiss myself / I'm so pretty". The lyrics make fun of "traditional masculine bravado" using "silly metaphors", "I'm too hot, hot damn / Make a dragon wanna retire man".

== Reception ==
"Uptown Funk" received positive reviews from most music critics. Nick Murray of Rolling Stone gave the song a rating of four out of five stars, praising the "George Kranz scatting and Nile Rodgers guitar riff." He noted that Mars, Ronson and The Hooligans "channel the days when brags weren't humble and disco wasn't retro." Spin's Brennan Carley noticed the resemblance between Mars's sing-rapping style and Nelly's vocals. He praised the former's voice for keeping things "light and bubbly". Carley compared the bass line to something that Prince would use. He felt "Uptown Funk" would be all over the radio in a short time. Danielle Janota writing for Consequence of Sound praised the single calling it the "crown jewel" of the album. Lucas Villa of AXS dubbed Ronson's latest approach to Funk "his freakiest, freshest and most fun release yet". Kirsten Maree of Renowned for Sound called the song "a joyous, bass-slapping little ditty that joins the likes of Olly Murs' Wrapped Up and Pharrell Williams' Gust Of Wind in a trend of soul clad 70's throwbacks. The vocal dum-dum bass line, meets the scratchy melody of the electric guitar right off the bat, sending us hurling back in time and ready to dance." PopMatters's Matt James called the track a "deftly daft, delirious and incessant, booty-shaking blast of brass 'n' bravado", finding it a standout on the album. John Parker from Drowned in Sound called the recording "inescapable, a bona fide modern day mega hit". Neil McCormick from The Telegraph enjoyed the track because he "liked all the records it was built out of, by James Brown, Earth Wind & Fire and The Gap Band". Stereogum's Tom Breihan wrote, "It's the best American #1 we've had in more than a year, easily, and maybe much more". However, he noticed it copied the work of Morris Day & The Time and "takes these old sounds, but it presents them with energy and inventiveness and charm and balls". Robbie Daw of Idolator called the single "a straight-up ass-kicker" and not a "half-hearted stab" at recreating the "70's groove". He also praised the song's lyrics like "Michelle Pfeiffer, that white gold" and "gotta kiss myself, so pretty".

Jim Farber of the New York Daily News said the recording "isn't even a song", adding "[i]t's a vamp, a rush of 'hit me' rhythms of the style patented by James Brown". Farber added that the vocals have "zip", but they "lack soul, not to mention an ounce of individuality". He called "Uptown Funk" the only "lazy track" on the album.

The song made the cut on several lists of best songs. In June 2015, Spin compiled a list of The 63 Best Songs of 2015 So Far with "Uptown Funk" at number 51. Andrew Unterberger wrote, the song enters "the canon of "September", "Celebration", and "I Gotta Feeling", jams to be played at every wedding from now until the end of time". Stereogum called it the best pop song of 2015: "Channeling Morris Day by way of Trinidad James, Mars and Mark Ronson crafted the year's most universal hit, one that will live on for decades at all kinds of jubilant public gatherings. It flaunts its sexiness and owns its freakiness. It's so hot that it probably sent several dozen dragons into early retirement." Vulture ranked it at number 6 on its "The 10 Best Songs of 2015" list: ""Uptown Funk" will be played at every wedding reception you attend for the rest of your life, and its opening notes will fill you with neither embarrassment nor dread. By the most reliable rubric, then, "Uptown Funk" is a great pop song." MTV placed it on its "Best Songs Of 2015" list: "As the year's most existential pop question goes: "Who was I before 'Uptown Funk'?" Really, can any of us actually remember a time this ubiquitous, certifiably catchy song wasn't part of our lives? Even if Mark Ronson and Bruno Mars didn't roll up to the VMAs in hair curlers, they still took home Best Male Video—and everyone with a pulse knows why. "Uptown Funk" is not just a song. "Uptown Funk" is lightning in a bottle. That white gold." On the list of the 101 best songs of 2015 compiled by Spin, Dan Weiss ranked the song at number 87 saying it emulates "Morris Day-esque funk ditty" and each one of us contributed to its success. Rolling Stone ranked "Uptown Funk" at number 25 on its 100 Greatest Songs of the Century – So Far in 2018. The magazine's writers described it as a "perfect Eighties funk-pop nostalgia bomb", praising the singer's "sparkling showmanship", and dubbing it "one of a kind". The Village Voice's annual year-end Pazz & Jop critics' poll selected it as the 23rd best song of 2014, tied with Meghan Trainor's "All About That Bass". The same critics selected "Uptown Funk" as the eighth best track of 2015. NPR included it on their list of favorite songs Of 2015. Stephen Thompson wrote, "If you're going to hear a song on the radio 15,000 times in a single summer, it might as well be this one". On 26 January 2015, the song was voted number six on radio station Triple J's Hottest 100 of 2014. Billboard included it on "The 50 Best Song Interpolations of the 21st Century" as it uses "All Gold Everything" (2012) by Trinidad James. Christine Werthman wrote that Mars "turned it into a jubilant call to shout from the rooftops and kick off a dance-funk break".

=== Accolades ===
"Uptown Funk" has received various awards and nominations following its commercial success. In 2015, the song won British Single of the Year at the Brit Awards, Best Pop at MelOn Music Awards and was one of the Top 10 Gold International Gold Songs at RTHK International Pop Poll Awards. The track also won BMI Pop Song of the Year at the BMI Awards, Song of the Year at Telehit Awards and Song of the Year at Soul Train Music Awards. It also received Soul Train nominations for The Ashford & Simpson Songwriter's Award and Best Collaboration. The single was nominated for Single of the Year and Collaboration of the Year at the 2015 American Music Awards, International Hit of the Year at the Danish GAFFA Awards and Best International Song at the Los Premios 40 Principales. It was also nominated for Best Collaboration and Centric Award at the BET Awards, Best Song and Best Collaboration at the MTV Europe Music Awards and Dancefloor Filler at the NME Awards.

In 2016, "Uptown Funk" received Grammy awards for Record of the Year and Best Pop Duo/Group Performance at the 58th Grammy Awards. It also won International Work of the Year at the APRA Music Awards, Best Collaboration at the iHeartRadio Music Awards, while it was nominated for Song of the Year. The song was also nominated for Top Radio Song and Top Streaming Song (Video) at the Billboard Music Awards. "Uptown Funk " was inducted to the 2017 edition of the Guinness World Records for achieving the most weeks at number one on Billboard's Digital Song Sales chart. This record was later broken by "Despacito" (2017). In 2017, the track was one of the winners of Most Performed Songs at the ASCAP Pop Music Awards. "Uptown Funk" is the fifth biggest song to have charted on the Billboard Hot 100.

=== Controversies and lawsuits ===
"Uptown Funk" was the subject of several lawsuits over copyright infringement. In 2015, similarities with "Oops Up Side Your Head" (1979) by the Gap Band led them, along with keyboardist Rudolph Taylor, and producer Lonnie Simmons to be added as co-writers of "Uptown Funk" receiving 17% of the publishing royalties. In the same year, Serbian artist Viktorija argued that "Uptown Funk" infringed on her track "Ulice mračne nisu za devojke". She decided not to sue Mars and Ronson. In 2016, electro-funk band Collage sued Ronson and Mars for copying their single, "Young Girls" (1983), while the Sequence, a rap group, claimed it infringed their single "Funk You Up" (1979) and sued a year later. In 2017, Lastrada Entertainment filed a lawsuit citing similarities with "More Bounce to the Ounce" (1980) by Zapp. In 2018, the Collage and Zapp lawsuits were dropped, with no word if there was a financial settlement. In early 2023, Billboard reported that The Sequence's lawsuit was dropped.

The track drew comparisons with the theme tune of The Really Wild Show, a BBC children's nature program that first aired in 1986. When Ronson was asked if he heard similarities between "Uptown Funk" and the theme tune, he said, "Oh, then the horns, I understand what they're saying, yeah, we owe a little bit ... all equally influenced by Quincy Jones". In 2021, Ronnie and Robert Wilson of the Gap Band filed another lawsuit due to the similarities between "Uptown Funk" and "Oops Up Side Your Head" as Ronnie Wilson and Robert Wilson's heirs "have yet to receive any publishing rights income". In 2023, Linda Wilson and the heirs of Robert Wilson filled another lawsuit against BMG as they "refused and failed to provide either the funds due to plaintiffs or an accounting".

== Commercial performance ==
=== United States ===
The single debuted at number 65 on the Billboard Hot 100 chart on 21 November 2014 due to digital sales, making it Ronson's first entry on the Billboard Hot 100. Assisted by the release of the official video and a performance on Saturday Night Live, it subsequently sold 110,000 digital copies. The song became the Billboard Hot 100's top Digital Gainer of the week and peaked at number 18 on 28 November 2014. In its third week, the track rose to number eight on the Billboard Hot 100, after the video's first full tracking week. It became Ronson's first top 10 as an artist. It debuted on the component charts of Streaming Songs and Radio Songs. On the week of 10 December 2014, "Uptown Funk" ascended to number five, with sales of 152,000 copies. It marked the eleventh top five on the Billboard Hot 100 for Mars. In its fourth week, the single peaked at number three on the Billboard Hot 100, selling 170,000 copies and achieving a 49 million airplay audience, thus receiving Airplay Gainer honors. The following week after The Voice performance, the recording stayed at number three for the second consecutive week. It was the biggest gainer in Digital Songs (244,000), Streaming (7.9 million), Airplay Audience (63 million), becoming the fifth song to top all three "categories". Ronson became the second lead male artist to top Digital Songs with a debut single, since Sam Smith's "Stay with Me" (2014). On 31 December 2014, the track rose to number two on the Billboard Hot 100 with 432,000 copies sold, 8.8 million streams and reached the top ten on Radio Songs with a 68 million audience. In its seventh week, "Uptown Funk" topped the Billboard Hot 100, with 382,000 downloads sold, 10 million U.S. streams and a 76 million airplay audience. The song is Ronson's only number-one single in the country and Mars's sixth. It became one of the longest running number-one singles on the Billboard Hot 100 and the third longest-running number-one single of the 2010s decade topping the chart for 14 consecutive weeks until it was replaced by Wiz Khalifa's "See You Again" featuring Charlie Puth. It topped the Billboard Hot 100-year-end chart and the Decade End Billboard Hot 100.

In its thirteenth week at number one, "Uptown Funk" became the first song to top the Billboard Hot 100 and its three main component charts for nine non-consecutive weeks. The recording spent 31 weeks in the top ten of the Billboard Hot 100 and 21 weeks on the top three of the aforementioned chart, a record previously held by Santana featuring Rob Thomas's "Smooth" (1999), with 19 weeks. After spending 25 weeks on the Billboard Hot 100's top five, it matched the record set by LeAnn Rimes' "How Do I Live" (1997). This record was broken by The Chainsmokers "Closer" (2016) featuring Halsey which spent 26 weeks on the Billboard Hot 100's top five. "Uptown Funk" sold at least 300,000 copies for eight consecutive weeks. Only "Blurred Lines" (2013) by Robin Thicke featuring Pharrell Williams and T.I. surpassed it by selling the same number ten weeks in a row. "Uptown Funk" tied the record for most weeks spent at the top of the Digital Song Sales chart (13 weeks) with Flo Rida's "Low" (2007) featuring T-Pain. This record was broken two years after by Luis Fonsi and Daddy Yankee's "Despacito" featuring Justin Bieber, with 17 weeks. The recording reached its highest peak on Streaming Songs with 24.5 million streams and 5.7 million on subscription-services in one week. "Uptown Funk" spent 12 weeks on the top position of Streaming Songs, it was the second best run at the time, only surpassed by the thirteen weeks of Iggy Azalea featuring Charli XCX's "Fancy" (2014). It spent 12 weeks at number one on the Radio Songs chart, reaching a peak of 181 million in all-format audience. It was Ronson's first single to reach number one in the radio songs charts and the sixth for Mars. "Uptown Funk" topped several component charts in the United States, such as Adult Pop Songs, Dance Club Songs, Dance/Mix Show Airplay, Pop Songs and Rhythmic Songs. It topped the year-end chart Mainstream Top 40. In the United States, the single sold 7.8 million downloads as of 28 September 2017. It was certified eleven times platinum by the Recording Industry Association of America (RIAA) on 18 October 2016, for track-equivalent sales of 11 million units.

=== International ===
On 29 November 2014, "Uptown Funk" debuted at number 63 on the Canadian Hot 100. The following week it reached the top ten, in the third week entered the top five peaking at number two in the fourth week. On the issue date of 10 January 2015, the song reached number one, a position it held for fifteen consecutive weeks. It became the second longest-running number-one single on the Canadian Hot 100, behind The Black Eyed Peas' "I Gotta Feeling" (2009), which spent sixteen weeks at number one. On the issue date of 25 April 2015, the song was replaced by Wiz Khalifa and Charlie Puth's "See You Again" (2015). It was certified diamond by Music Canada (MC) for track-equivalent sales of 800,000 units. It was the top song on the year-end chart in Canada. In the United Kingdom, "Uptown Funk" was covered by Fleur East on The X Factor before its official release date, the cover reached number one on iTunes. This led the original version being released five weeks earlier than originally planned. Nevertheless it debuted at number one on the UK Singles Chart on 14 December 2014, giving Ronson his first UK number one as a producer and artist and also giving Mars his fifth UK number one. The following week, the song was replaced in the top spot by the X Factor winner Ben Haenow's single, "Something I Need" (2014), making it the Christmas number one. It then returned to number one for a further six consecutive weeks spending seven non-consecutive weeks at number one, before being replaced from the top by Ellie Goulding's "Love Me Like You Do" (2015).

The track was certified eight times platinum by the British Phonographic Industry (BPI), for track-equivalent sales of 4,800,000 units. "Uptown Funk" was the best-selling song of 2015 in the UK, with combined sales of 1.76 million during the year (total 2.25 million). As of September 2017, the song had 2,723,470 combining units, making the list of best-selling singles of the 21st century in the United Kingdom as the fourth best-selling single based on paid-for sales and the second best-selling song based on combined sales. It made the year-end charts in 2014 and 2015, topping the latter. "Uptown Funk" debuted at number two on 12 December 2014, and the following week peaked at the top of the Irish Singles Chart, taking the Christmas number one spot. It became the first song not released by The X Factor winner to reach this position in nine years. It spent seven weeks at number one on the Irish Charts, before being knocked off the top by Ellie Goulding's "Love Me Like You Do" (2015).

It reached the top spot in France in its sixth week, spending 11 weeks in the number one position. It charted for a total of 122 weeks, never leaving it from 2014 to 2017. It was certified diamond by the Syndicat National de l'Édition Phonographique (SNEP) for sales of 250,000 copies. "Uptown Funk" reached number one on both Belgium charts, Ultratop 50 Wallonia and Flanders, spending six and three weeks on the top of the respective charts. The song was certified three times platinum by the Belgian Entertainment Association (BEA), for sales of 90,000 copies. In Italy, the song was certified five times platinum, for track-equivalent sales of 250,000 units, despite only peaking at number three on the FIMI Singles Chart. The single debuted at number 11 in Australia on 30 November 2014, jumping to number two the following week. In its third week, it topped the charts, where it stayed for a total of six weeks. It is tied for the fifth best-selling single in Australia of all time and has been certified 22 times platinum for track-equivalent sales of 1,540,000. The single made the Australian year-end charts in 2014, 2015 and 2016, peaking at number one in 2015. In New Zealand, the song debuted in the top ten, at number seven. In its fourth week on the chart, it peaked at number one, staying there for nine consecutive weeks. The track not only topped the year-end chart, but it was certified ten times platinum by Recorded Music NZ (RMNZ). "Uptown Funk" set a record, achieved by four other songs, as it topped the Billboard Hot 100 and the Official UK Singles chart for at least seven weeks each. The song is reported to earn $100,000 for the label and composers per week streaming on Spotify alone. It had sold over twenty million equivalent units as of 2015.

== Impact ==
The success of "Uptown Funk" made it a worldwide phenomenon with a major impact on pop culture. At one point, the song broke its own streaming record three times in the United Kingdom, with 2.34, 2.49 and 2.56 million streams. It also broke the record for most streamed track in the United States and worldwide in one week, with 4.8 and 15 million streams, respectively. Tom Breihan writing for Stereogum felt the recording had "transcend[ed] hit status" and become "omnipresent". It is "some sort of cultural event", that will be heard at weddings in the next couple of years. Danielle Janota of Consequence of Sound believed the single had a cultural impact. It is "more than infectious: It's instinctual", as everyone "stampedes furiously to the closest dance floor the second it comes on". Matt James of PopMatters said the recording "incite[s] mass euphoric dancing wherever it is unleashed". It also demonstrates its "global domination", seeming to be "the only song on planet earth right now".

In an interview with Time, Mark Ronson said the recording was being played in Morocco, Puerto Rico and Nigeria, countries his music had never reached before. He also confessed the track led to people starting to recognise him. Newsweek's Jed Gottlieb explained the reason "Uptown Funk" is an immortal track is because "the song is an increasingly rare phenomenon", since dancing allows us to connect "divergent demographics". "[T]he song creates an ephemeral flash where disparate groups get along because they've been spiked with the same euphoria". He believed "for the next quarter-century, it will persist as a choice wedding spin." NME's Barry Nicolson dubbed the single "an insta-phenomenon". Jeremy Allen of BBC said that "the biggest hits of the past few years", such as Ronson's "Uptown Funk" and Daft Punk's "Get Lucky" (2013) drew inspiration from the 80s funk/soul works by Prince, Michael Jackson, Nile Rodgers and others, leading the "80s to dominate modern culture". Nevertheless, when Angus Harrison of Vice asked musicologist Dr. John Burgoyne if it would be remembered in twenty years he explained that despite "the melody being sung, the hook is not" and he is unsure if it will be remembered as "the hook is that trumpet drop, whereas the words 'Uptown Funk' just sort of disappear."

In November 2019, Consequence of Sound compiled a list of the "Top 100 Songs of the 2010s" with "Uptown Funk" at number 77. Ali Szubiak wrote, the song became "so embedded in our cultural core that it proved inescapable". Szubiak added, "not since 'Uptown Funk' has the world felt so united." A month later, Rolling Stone also compiled a list of the "Top 100 Songs of the 2010s" with "Uptown Funk" at number 66. Jon Dolan affirmed the song "kick-starting a 2010s funk revival that Mars himself and Lizzo would blow wide open". The staff from NME dubbed "Uptown Funk" as one of The 100 Best Songs of the 2010s, ranking at number 56, Rhian Daly classified it as "a gigantic, joy-giving earworm". On the same month, Jay Cridlin writing for Tampa Bay Times compiled a list of the 50 "The best pop songs of the 2010s", placing "Uptown Funk" at the top of it. Cridlin felt the track "is timeless, and somehow, it still sounds fresh." Nerisha Penrose from Elle dubbed the track as one of the 52 Best Songs That Defined the 2010s, ranking at number 25, saying it "had the whole world smiling and dancing for weeks." Stereogum compiled a list of The 200 Best Songs Of The 2010s, ranking "Uptown Funk" at number 19, Margaret Farrell affirmed the record "was a monstrously successful, inescapable single, the soundtrack for 2014 and well into 2015." According to Billboard, the single was one of the "Songs That Defined the Decade". Taylor Weatherby described it as "Four and a half minutes of pure fun, with hooks galore and memorable lines". In 2021, Rolling Stone placed "Uptown Funk" at number 417 on their "Top 500 Greatest Songs of All Time". In 2022, Billboard's staff ranked the "500 Best Pop Songs", placing the single at number 76. Danielle Pascual wrote "fusing a rhythmic vocal base line ('doh doh doh'), a blaring horn section, a Trinidad James lift and Bruno Mars' soulful tone to create a brilliant and unpredictable modern disco-pop song".

In late 2024, Billboard's Kyle Denis affirmed that "Uptown Funk" "is the kind of genuine cultural phenomenon and musical juggernaut that feels damn near impossible in this age of hyper-fragmented social media silos. From Mars' annoyingly charming vocal performance to an irresistible brass breakdown, 'Uptown Funk' was simply inescapable. Mars's presence on the track was so outsized that many forget it's not even his song."

== Music video ==
=== Development and synopsis ===
The music video was filmed at the 20th Century Fox Studios' "New York Street" backlot in Los Angeles. Mars and Cameron Duddy directed the video released on 17 November 2014. In it, Ronson and Mars are wearing clothing from the late 1970s and 1980s. Mars wears a "salmon-colored blazer" and both put on sun glasses. Throughout most of the video, Ronson, Mars and The Hooligans are singing, walking and dancing in the middle of the streets. Ronson is seen mostly lingering in the background, while Mars takes the spotlight. At one point, during the video, Ronson and Mars get their hair put in perm curlers at a hair salon and their shoes shined. As Mars sings "Fill my cup, put some liquor in it", one of his bandmates does so. The singer also yells at his chauffeur to get the limousine as he, Ronson and the band "jive" next to it. Towards the end of the video, Ronson, Mars, The Hooligans and Jeff Bhasker perform the song in a closed set to several people.

=== Reception ===
Joe Lynch of Billboard praised the video, finding it to be as "ebullient" as the song, calling Ronson and Mars "impossibly cool". Rap-Up praised the dance moves performed by Mars and The Hooligans. Tom Breihan of Stereogum said, "I had no idea [Mars] had 'ersatz Morris Day' in his arsenal." Ryan Reed from Rolling Stone called the video "goofy". The clip made the cut on several lists of best music videos of the year. Lyndsey Parker, also writing in Rolling Stone felt Ronson and Mars complement Morris Day and The Time's "funky-fresh-to-death tradition well", ranking it number six on the list of 20 videos. On its list of the 20 Best Music Videos of 2014 compiled by Paste, Dacey Orr ranked the video at number 11 saying it "has all of the fun and embellishment and color and choreography to be a real classic". On the Stereogum 40 Best Music Videos of 2014, Breihan placed it at number 25. He wrote, "imagine a world in which circa-1986 Jonathan Demme had directed a movie about Morris Day & The Time". Harriet Gibsone writing for The Guardian found the video has "super-slick, Jackson-like group choreography, glossy production and retro styling". On the Stereogum 20 Best Music Videos of 2010s, Breihan placed the music video at number four.

The video received multiple awards and nominations. In 2015, it was nominated for British Video of the Year at the BRIT Awards. At the 2015 MTV Video Music Awards, it received nominations for Video of the Year, Best Pop Video, Best Collaboration and Best Direction and an award for Best Male Video. In the same year, the UK Music Video Awards awarded it Best Pop Video-UK and it was nominated for Best Male Video at the 2015 MTV Video Music Awards Japan. It received an award for Video of the Year and a nomination for Best Dance Performance at the 2015 Soul Train Music Awards. The video has over 5.4 billion views on YouTube as of February 2025, making it the ninth most viewed YouTube video of all time.

== Live performances ==
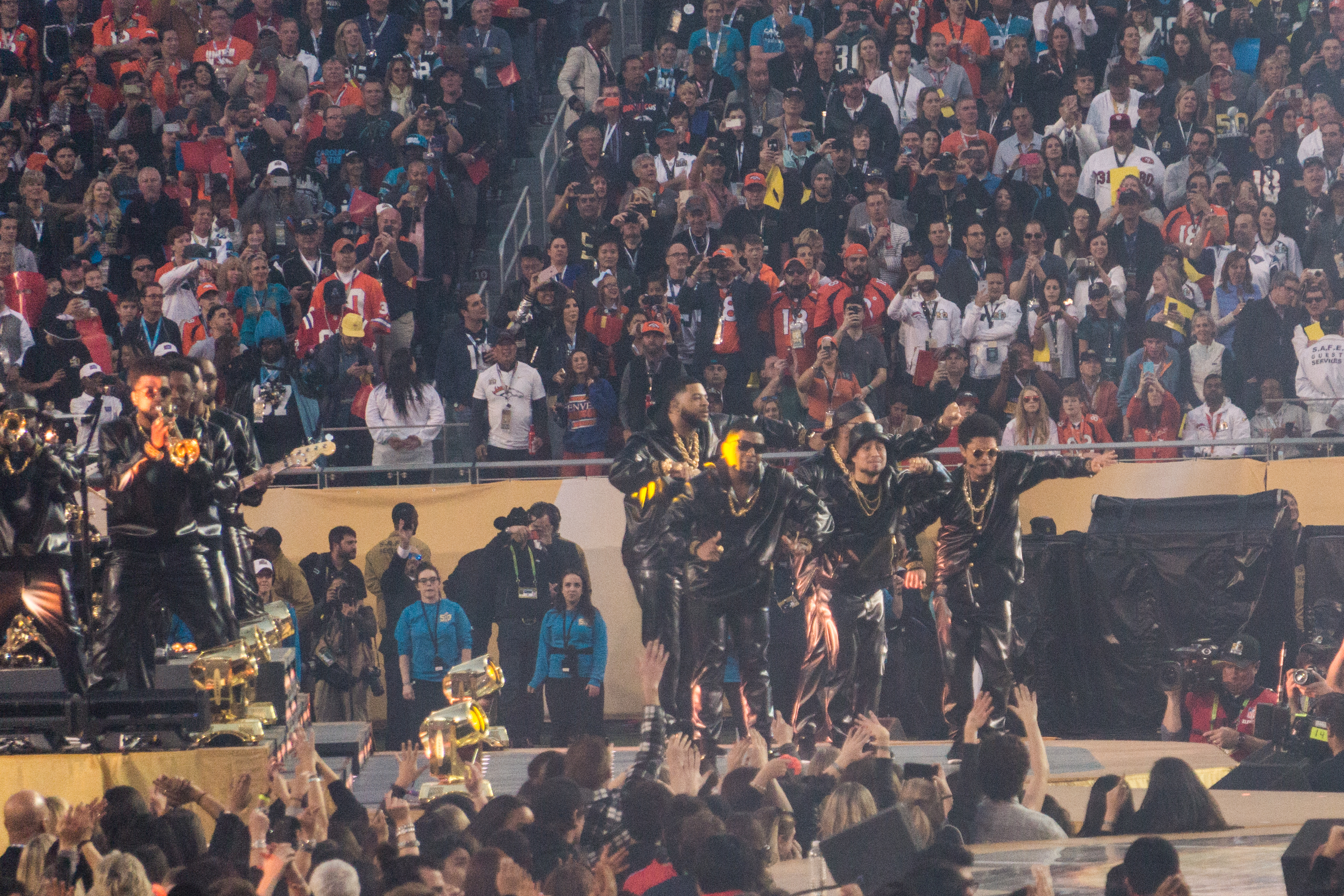
Bruno Mars and The Hooligans performing "Uptown Funk" at the Super Bowl 50 halftime show

"Uptown Funk" was first performed live by Ronson and Mars on Saturday Night Live on 22 November 2014. Mars wore shades and a salmon-colored blazer. Their performance was well received by critics. Colin Joyce of Spin magazine praised Ronson's "electric guitar performance" describing it as something "that Prince ... could have been proud of". Joyce also commended the effortless singing and rapping skills of Mars. The Village Voice's Hillary Hugues praised the vocals by Mars, dance moves and the "taut line between cheeky confidence and charm". Iyana Robertson of Vibe complimented the "groove" of the song, as well as, the reenactment of "the retro swag" music video. The track was also performed live during the North American version of The Voice final on 16 December 2014. During the show, Mars and his band, The Hooligans, performed a rehearsed choreography, while the singer wore gold rollers in his hair. Critics found the use of rollers by Mars in his hair hilarious.

Ronson and Mars performed "Uptown Funk" live on The Ellen DeGeneres Show on 13 January 2015. The performance began with Ronson demonstrating some of his DJ skills by scratching and doing hypeman work. Then Mars, dressed in a red blazer, snap back and black shades, and some of his band-mates, led the "audience through some choreography", before making their way to the stage, where Ellen also showed "her little two-step". Chris DeVille from Stereogum characterised the performance as a "blast", while NME's Nadia Khomami dubbed it "energetic". In the same vein, Shenequa Golding from Vibe, called the show "dope". In 2016, this performance earned them a nomination for a Daytime Emmy Award at the 43rd Daytime Creative Arts Emmy Awards.

After Coldplay were announced as the lead performers for the Super Bowl 50 halftime show, Chris Martin asked Mars to join them, but he declined. Martin explained he wanted Mars to perform "Uptown Funk" with Beyoncé. Mars still did not think it was a good idea, but Beyoncé was receptive to the idea. On 7 February 2016, the trio took the stage during the halftime show. Ronson appeared handling DJ duties, while Mars and his dancers performed "Uptown Funk", wearing an all-black Versace outfit with gold chains. During the show, Beyoncé, in a Michael Jackson-inspired outfit appeared with a set of backing dancers dressed as Black Panthers. She performed her single "Formation" (2016) in choreography before being challenged by Mars to a dance-off, while singing the track. At that point Martin joined Beyoncé and Mars singing the song. Jon Caramanica of The New York Times explained that Beyoncé and Mars brought "soul and funk" to the show, while The Guardian's Alex Needham and Caroline Framke of Vox praised Beyoncé, but criticised Mars and Coldplay's performance. During The Late Late Show with James Corden on 13 December 2016, Mars included "Uptown Funk" on the popular segment Carpool Karaoke. Mars performed the song as the closing act at the Apollo Theater alongside the majority of the 24K Magic (2016) album for his CBS prime time special titled Bruno Mars: 24K Magic Live at the Apollo, which aired on November 29, 2017. On the 24K Magic World Tour (2017–18), Mars performed "Uptown Funk" as the last track of the setlist, sung as an encore. The same happened on the setlist of Bruno Mars Live (2022–2024).

== Use in other media and covers ==
The song was also featured in commercials for L'Oreal's Garnier line, Skippy peanut butter and the Cadillac XT4. It is also featured in the film Sonic the Hedgehog 2 (2022), on the episode "Child Star" of the sixth season of Glee and in the video game Sackboy: A Big Adventure.

The song has been parodied several times. Scot Pankey, a teacher at A. Maceo Smith New Tech High School in Dallas, gave his students a video project using the track. His students came up with an idea and once Pankey heard it, he wanted to join them. After seeing the video, Mars admitted he cried. Mikey Bolts, who is known for his impressions and parodies, recreated the "Uptown Funk" singing in the voices of Family Guy characters. The voices of Peter Griffin and Stewie Griffin are the most prominent on the track. In September 2015, YouTube channel What's The Mashup? used 100 dance scenes from various films synchronizing them to the rhythm of "Uptown Funk". Later the single was mashed up with dance moves of different actors, such as Fred Astaire, Ginger Rogers and Gene Kelly, in films from the Golden Age of Hollywood. The speed which the scenes are shown was unchanged. The YouTube channel known as Baracksdubs created the illusion of President Barack Obama singing "Uptown Funk", using snippets of his speeches.

Ronson recorded a new version of the song with six unknown musicians for YouTube at the Abbey Road Studios. Initially, the group thought they were covering the track for a documentary about Ronson. On 12 February 2015, Ronson premiered the first official remix of "Uptown Funk", a radio-exclusive, during his interview on Hot 97. It includes a new intro verse by rapper Action Bronson; the final version includes a verse by rapper Bodega Bamz. The song has been used by Ligue 1 club Paris Saint Germain to celebrate home goals.

== Track listing ==
- Digital download
1. "Uptown Funk" (featuring Bruno Mars) – 4:30
- CD single
1. "Uptown Funk" (featuring Bruno Mars) – 4:30
2. "Feel Right" (featuring Mystikal) – 3:42
- 12" vinyl

A. "Uptown Funk" – 4:30
B. "Uptown Funk" (BB Disco Dub Mix) (Benji B Remix) – 6:19

- Remixes – EP
1. "Uptown Funk" (featuring Bruno Mars) – 4:30
2. "Uptown Funk" (featuring Bruno Mars) (Dave Audé Remix) – 3:57
3. "Uptown Funk" (featuring Bruno Mars) (Wideboys VIP Remix) – 3:16
4. "Uptown Funk" (featuring Bruno Mars) (Will Sparks Remix) – 4:37
- Trinidad James Remix
1. "Uptown Funk" (featuring Bruno Mars) (Trinidad James Remix) – 4:22

== Personnel ==
Credits adapted from the liner notes of Uptown Special and Billboard.

- Mark Ronson – songwriting, production, guitars, LinnDrum, programming, engineer
- Jeff Bhasker – songwriting, production, keyboards, talkbox
- Bruno Mars – lead vocals, songwriting, production, drums
- Philip Lawrence – songwriting
- Nicholas Williams – songwriting
- Devon Gallaspy – songwriting
- Charlie Wilson – songwriting
- Robert Wilson – songwriting
- Ronnie Wilson – songwriting
- Rudolph Taylor – songwriting
- Lonnie Simmons – songwriting
- Jamareo Artis – bass
- Phredley Brown – additional keyboards
- David Guy – trumpet
- Michael Leonhart – trumpet
- Jimmy King – trumpet
- Neal Sugarman – tenor saxophone
- Dwayne Dagger – tenor saxophone
- Ian Hendrickson-Smith – baritone saxophone
- Ray Mason – trombone
- Kameron Whalum – trombone
- Boo Mitchell – engineer
- Charles Moniz – engineer
- Wayne Gordon – engineer
- Josh Blair – engineer
- Inaam Haq – engineer
- Ken Lewis – additional engineering
- Devin Nakao – additional engineering
- Matthew Stevens – additional engineering
- Riccardo Damian – engineer
- Serban Ghenea – mixing
- John Hanes – mix engineering
- Tom Coyne – mastering

== Charts ==
=== Weekly charts ===
List of chart positions
Chart (2014–2015)	Peak position
Argentina (Monitor Latino)	16
Australia (ARIA)	1
Austria (Ö3 Austria Top 40)	6
Belgium (Ultratop 50 Flanders)	1
Belgium Urban (Ultratop Flanders)	1
Belgium (Ultratop 50 Wallonia)	1
Canada Hot 100 (Billboard)	1
Canada AC (Billboard)	1
Canada CHR/Top 40 (Billboard)	1
Canada Hot AC (Billboard)	1
Colombia Anglo (National-Report)	1
CIS Airplay (TopHit)	18
Czech Republic Airplay (ČNS IFPI)	7
Czech Republic Singles Digital (ČNS IFPI)	2
Denmark (Tracklisten)	2
Ecuador (National-Report)	29
Finland (Suomen virallinen lista)	5
France (SNEP)	1
Germany (GfK)	3
Hungary (Dance Top 40)	2
Hungary (Rádiós Top 40)	1
Hungary (Single Top 40)	1
Hungary (Stream Top 40)	2
Ireland (IRMA)	1
Israel International Airplay (Media Forest)	1
Italy (FIMI)	3
Japan Hot 100 (Billboard)	12
Lebanon Airplay (Lebanese Top 20)	1
Luxembourg Digital Song Sales (Billboard)	1
Mexico (Billboard Mexican Airplay)	1
Mexico Anglo (Monitor Latino)	1
Netherlands (Dutch Top 40)	4
Netherlands (Single Top 100)	2
New Zealand (Recorded Music NZ)	1
Norway (VG-lista)	6
Poland Airplay (ZPAV)	7
Portugal Digital Songs Sales (Billboard)	4
Russia Airplay (TopHit)	16
Scottish Singles Sales (Official Charts)	1
Slovakia Airplay (ČNS IFPI)	33
Slovakia Singles Digital (ČNS IFPI)	2
Slovenia (SloTop50)	3
South Africa Airplay (EMA)	1
South Korea (Gaon)	2
Spain (Promusicae)	1
Sweden (Sverigetopplistan)	8
Switzerland (Schweizer Hitparade)	2
UK Singles (Official Charts)	1
Ukraine Airplay (TopHit)	5
US Billboard Hot 100	1
US Adult Contemporary (Billboard)	5
US Adult Pop Airplay (Billboard)	1
US Dance Club Songs (Billboard)	1
US Dance Airplay (Billboard)	1
US Latin Airplay (Billboard)	16
US Pop Airplay (Billboard)	1
US R&B/Hip-Hop Airplay (Billboard)	5
US Rhythmic Airplay (Billboard)	1

List of chart positions
Chart (2021–2024)	Peak position
Estonia Airplay (TopHit)	90
Global 200 (Billboard)	133
Ukraine Airplay (TopHit)	131

=== Year-end charts ===
List of chart positions
Chart (2014)	Position
Australia (ARIA)	29
France (SNEP)	66
Netherlands (Dutch Top 40)	94
UK Singles (OCC)	30

List of chart positions
Chart (2015)	Position
Australia (ARIA)	1
Austria (Ö3 Austria Top 40)	16
Belgium (Ultratop Flanders)	1
Belgium (Ultratop Wallonia)	3
Brazil (Crowley)	42
Canada (Canadian Hot 100)	1
CIS (Tophit)	60
France (SNEP)	3
Germany (Official German Charts)	22
Hungary (Dance Top 40)	4
Hungary (Rádiós Top 40)	3
Hungary (Single Top 40)	9
Israel (Media Forest)	1
Italy (FIMI)	11
Netherlands (Dutch Top 40)	17
Netherlands (Single Top 100)	8
New Zealand (Recorded Music NZ)	1
Poland (Polish Airplay Top 100)	31
Russia Airplay (Tophit)	67
Slovenia (SloTop50)	16
Spain (PROMUSICAE)	5
Sweden (Sverigetopplistan)	18
Switzerland (Schweizer Hitparade)	9
Ukraine Airplay (Tophit)	49
UK Singles (OCC)	1
US Billboard Hot 100	1
US Adult Contemporary (Billboard)	6
US Adult Top 40 (Billboard)	5
US Dance Club Songs (Billboard)	12
US Dance/Mix Show Airplay (Billboard)	3
US Mainstream Top 40 (Billboard)	1
US Rhythmic (Billboard)	7
Worldwide (IFPI)	2

List of chart positions
Chart (2016)	Position
Argentina (Monitor Latino)	31
Australia (ARIA)	94
France (SNEP)	103
Hungary (Dance Top 40)	40
Israel (Media Forest)	45
Japan (Japan Hot 100)	75
Spain (PROMUSICAE)	99

2017 Year-end chart performance
Chart (2017)	Position
Japan (Japan Hot 100)	58

List of chart position
Chart (2024)	Position
Estonia Airplay (TopHit)	151

List of chart position
Chart (2025)	Position
Argentina Anglo Airplay (Monitor Latino)	81

=== Decade-end charts ===
List of chart positions
Chart (2010–2019)	Position
Australia (ARIA)	3
UK Singles (OCC)	2
US Billboard Hot 100	1

=== All-time charts ===
List of chart positions
Chart	Position
UK Singles (OCC)	21
US Billboard Hot 100	5
US Mainstream Top 40 (Billboard)	20
Netherlands (Single Top 100)	58

== Certifications ==
List of certifications
Region	Certification	Certified units/sales
Australia (ARIA)	22× Platinum	1,540,000^{‡}
Austria (IFPI Austria)	Gold	15,000^{*}
Belgium (BRMA)	3× Platinum	60,000^{‡}
Canada (Music Canada)	Diamond	800,000^{‡}
Denmark (IFPI Danmark)	3× Platinum	270,000^{‡}
France (SNEP)	Diamond	250,000^{*}
Germany (BVMI)	2× Platinum	1,200,000^{‡}
Italy (FIMI)	5× Platinum	250,000^{‡}
Japan (RIAJ)	Gold	100,000^{*}
Mexico (AMPROFON)	3× Diamond+Platinum	960,000^{‡}
Netherlands (NVPI)	Platinum	30,000^{‡}
New Zealand (RMNZ)	10× Platinum	300,000^{‡}
Norway (IFPI Norway)	3× Platinum	30,000^{‡}
Spain (Promusicae)	4× Platinum	160,000^{‡}
Sweden (GLF)	Platinum	40,000^{‡}
United Kingdom (BPI)	8× Platinum	4,800,000^{‡}
United States (RIAA)	11× Platinum	11,000,000^{‡}
Streaming
Japan (RIAJ)	Platinum	100,000,000^{†}
South Korea	—	100,000,000
^{*} Sales figures based on certification alone.^{‡} Sales+streaming figures based on certification alone.^{†} Streaming-only figures based on certification alone.

== Release history ==
List of release history, showing region(s), date(s), format(s), version(s) and label(s)
Region	Date	Format	Version	Label	Ref.
Australia	10 November 2014	Digital download	Original	Columbia; Sony	
New Zealand	10 November 2014	Digital download	Original	Sony	
United States	10 November 2014	Digital download	Original	Sony	
United States	11 November 2014	Contemporary hit radio	Unknown	RCA	
Italy	14 November 2014	Contemporary hit radio	Original	Sony	
United Kingdom	8 December 2014	Digital download	Original	Columbia	
United Kingdom	8 December 2014	Contemporary hit radio	Unknown	Unknown	
Austria	9 January 2015	CD single	Original	Sony	
Germany	9 January 2015	CD single	Original	Sony	
Switzerland	9 January 2015	CD single	Original	Sony	
United Kingdom	16 February 2015	12"	Original; Remix	Columbia	
United States	24 February 2015	12"	Original; Remix	Columbia	
United States	13 April 2015	Digital Download	Remixes	Sony	
United States	29 June 2015	Digital Download	Trinidad James remix	Sony	
Various	19 July 2018	Digital Download	Radio edit	Columbia	

== See also ==
- List of best-selling singles in Australia
- List of best-selling singles in the United Kingdom
- List of best-selling singles in the United States
- List of number-one singles of 2014 (Australia)
- List of number-one singles of 2015 (Australia)
- List of number-one digital tracks of 2015 (Australia)
- List of number-one streaming tracks of 2015 (Australia)
- List of number-one urban singles of 2014 (Australia)
- List of number-one urban singles of 2015 (Australia)
- List of Ultratop 50 Flanders number-one singles of 2015
- List of Ultratop 50 Wallonia number-one singles of 2015
- List of Canadian Hot 100 number-one singles of 2015
- List of number-one hits of 2014 (France)
- List of number-one hits of 2015 (France)
- Lists of number-one singles of the 2010s (Hungary)
- List of number-one singles of 2015 (Ireland)
- List of number-one songs of 2015 (Mexico)
- List of Mexico Airplay number-one singles from the 2010s
- List of Mexico Ingles Airplay singles of the 2010s
- Lists of number-one singles from the 2010s (New Zealand)
- List of Romandie Charts number-one singles of 2015
- List of Scottish number-one singles of 2015
- List of number-one international songs of 2015 (South Korea)
- List of number-one singles of 2015 (South Africa)
- List of number-one singles of 2015 (Spain)
- List of UK Singles Chart number ones of the 2010s
- List of Billboard Hot 100 number-one singles of 2015
- Lists of Adult Top 40 number-one songs of the 2010s
- List of Billboard Dance/Mix Show Airplay number-one singles of 2015
- List of Hot 100 Airplay number-one singles of the 2010s
- List of number-one dance singles of 2015 (U.S.)
- List of number-one digital songs of 2015 (U.S.)
- List of Billboard Mainstream Top 40 number-one songs of 2015
- List of Billboard Rhythmic number-one songs of the 2010s
- List of most liked YouTube videos
- List of most streamed songs on Spotify
- List of most streamed songs in the United Kingdom
- List of most-viewed YouTube videos
- List of best-selling singles
