= Gap Gold: The Best of The Gap Band =

Greatest hits album by The Gap Band
- Released: March 1985
- Recorded: 1979–1983
- Genre: R&B; funk; soul
- Length: 54:26
- Label: Total Experience
- Producer: Lonnie Simmons

The Gap Band chronology
Gap Band VI (1984)	Gap Gold: The Best of The Gap Band (1985)	Gap Band VII (1985)

Gap Gold: The Best of The Gap Band is a greatest hits album by American group The Gap Band. It was released in March 1985 on Total Experience Records. The album contains most of their commercially successful singles from 1979–1983.

== Commercial performance ==
Gap Gold peaked at number 103 on the US Billboard 200. the album was certified platinum by the Recording Industry Association of America (RIAA) for selling 1 million copies in the United States.

== Track listing ==
- Side one
1. Burn Rubber (Why You Wanna Hurt Me) – 5:16
2. Outstanding – 3:18
3. I Don't Believe You Want To Get Up And Dance (Oops) – 8:31
4. Party Train – 5:58
5. Stay With Me – 4:10
- Side two
1. You Dropped A Bomb On Me – 5:10
2. Early In The Morning – 6:28
3. Yearning For Your Love – 5:41
4. Shake – 4:57
5. Season's No Reason To Change – 4:47

== Charts ==
Chart (1985)	Peak position
US Billboard 200	103
US Top R&B/Hip-Hop Albums (Billboard)	46

== Certifications ==
Region	Certification	Certified units/sales
United States (RIAA)	Platinum	1,000,000^{^}
^{^} Shipments figures based on certification alone.
