= Call Me Goodie =

Studio album by Robert "Goodie" Whitfield
- Released: 1982
- Studio: Total Experience Recording Studios (Hollywood, California)
- Genre: R&B; Funk; Boogie
- Label: Total Experience
- Producer: Lonnie Simmons "Come Into My Life" written and produced by Ronnie Wilson

Call Me Goodie is the debut album by R&B singer Robert "Goodie" Whitfield, released in 1982 on Total Experience Records. It was produced by label owner Lonnie Simmons, famous for his work with the Gap Band, while the song "Come Into My Life" was written and produced by the Gap Band's Ronnie Wilson.

Call Me Goodie peaked at No. 31 on the R&B albums chart. The song "Do Something" was featured on episode #405 of Soul Train.

== Track listing ==
1. "Do Something" (Lonnie Simmons, Jonah Ellis, Robert "Goodie" Whitfield) 5:57
2. "You And I" (Jonah Ellis) 4:35
3. "Does Anybody Know Where The Party Is" (Jonas Ellis) 5:55
4. "Puddin' Pie" (Jonah Ellis) 4:32
5. "L.A." (Robert "Goodie" Whitfield, Lonnie Simmons) 3:47
6. "Goodie" (Lonnie Simmons, Robert "Goodie" Whitfield, Victor "Widetrack" Hill) 5:45
7. "Come into My Life" (Ronnie Wilson) 3:56
8. "Country Rap" (Lonnie Simmons, Robert "Goodie" Whitfield, Charlie Wilson, Alisa Peoples, Cavin Yarbrough) 4:52
9. "Goody Goody" (Marty Malneck, Johnny Mercer) 3:55
