= Live & Well =

Live & Well may refer to:

- Live & Well (B.B. King album), 1969
- Live & Well (Gap Band album), 1996
- Live and Well, a 2004 album by Dolly Parton

== See also ==
- LiveAndWell.com, a 1999 live album by David Bowie
- 'Live and Well in Japan!, a 1978 album by Benny Carter
- Alive and Well (disambiguation)
