= Oops Up Side Your Head =

1979 single by the Gap Band

"I Don't Believe You Want to Get Up and Dance (Oops!)"
- One of side-A labels of the U.S. 7-inch vinyl single

Single by The Gap Band

from the album The Gap Band II
- A-side: "The Boys Are Back in Town" / "Steppin' (Out)" (UK MERX2)
- B-side: Main title (UK MERX2); "The Boys Are Back in Town" (UK MER22/X22); "Party Lights" / "The Boys Are Back in Town" (Netherlands)
- Released: 1979
- Recorded: 1979
- Genre: Funk, disco
- Length: 3:29 (7"); 8:39 (12")
- Label: Mercury
- Songwriters: Ronnie Wilson, Rudy Taylor, Robert Wilson, Lonnie Simmons, Charlie Wilson
- Producer: Lonnie Simmons

The Gap Band singles chronology
"Steppin' (Out)" (1979)	"I Don't Believe You Want to Get Up and Dance (Oops!)" (1979)	"Party Lights" (1979)

"I Don't Believe You Want to Get Up and Dance (Oops!)" (re-titled "Oops Up Side Your Head" on the single as well as being known by other titles such as "Oops Upside Your Head") is a 1979 song recorded by American funk group the Gap Band. It was taken from the group's fourth studio album, The Gap Band II; both single and album achieved commercial success.

The single was released in several countries in different formats. In the United States it was a 12" with "Party Lights" as the B-side. In the Netherlands, the 12" B-side was "The Boys Are Back in Town". In France, the single was a 7" with no B-side.

In the UK, the track first surfaced in mid-to-late 1979 as the B-side of the 12" release of "The Boys Are Back in Town" / "Steppin' (Out)". Then in 1980, due to its popularity, it was flipped and re-titled with just "The Boys Are Back in Town" as the B-side. It was later released once again as the B-side to some copies of the remix version of "Party Lights". In 1987, a 12" remix was released in the UK with a dub version B-side.

The single became an international hit for the group upon its late 1979 release. Though it failed to reach the Billboard Hot 100 (peaking at number two on its Bubbling Under Hot 100 chart), the song hit the top ten on the US R&B and disco charts, and also became a big seller outside the US, where it peaked at number six both in the UK (in 1980) and in the Netherlands.

== Structure ==
- The song, which runs for nearly nine minutes in the full 12" single version, features a driving bass-line with a simple repeated E-G-A-B pattern.

=== P-Funk influence ===
- The humorous monologues throughout the song by Gap Band lead singer Charlie Wilson were inspired by his cousin Bootsy Collins' own humorous slant in his songs.
- Wilson's spoken intro, "this is radio station W-GAP", was a reference to Parliament's opening line in "P. Funk (Wants to Get Funked Up)", "welcome to radio station W-E-F-U-N-K, better known as WE-FUNK."
- The line, "the bigger the headache the bigger the pill, the bigger the doctor the bigger the bill" was said to be influenced by similar lines from Parliament-Funkadelic in the mid-'70s including the line "the bigger the headache, the bigger the pill" in "Dr. Funkenstein". The Jack & Jill line would later be continued on their next anthem, "Humpin'".
- The horn break is a direct lift from the intro to "Disco to Go" by The Brides of Funkenstein.
- The band made little use of the synthesizer prior to this song, and the use of the synthesizer expanded with each passing album. By 1982, most of the band's hits were synthesizer-laden electrofunk.
  - The Gap Band III featured "Humpin'" and "Burn Rubber on Me (Why You Wanna Hurt Me)" which use even more synthesizer than this song.
  - By Gap Band IV, almost all the songs which were not quiet storm-style ballads were heavily laden with synthesizer. The use of synthesizers led to two songs, "Early in the Morning" and "You Dropped a Bomb on Me" topping the R&B charts in 1982.

=== Nursery rhyme allusions ===
- "Jack and Jill went up the hill to have a little fun/stupid Jill forgot her pill and now they've got a son."
  - Their 1980 song, "Humpin'", also references Jack & Jill.
- "Humpty Dumpty sat on the wall/Humpty Dumpty had a great fall... I say he cracked on the whack!"
- Little Miss Muffet and Mary Had a Little Lamb are also mentioned.

== Legacy ==
The song was reworked in 1990 by Eurodance group Snap! for their single "Ooops Up".

In 1996, the song was heavily sampled in Snoop Dogg's "Snoop's Upside Ya Head", which also featured Gap Band lead vocalist Charlie Wilson.

In April 2015, it was announced that the writers of "Oops Up Side Your Head" had had their names added to the writing credits of Mark Ronson's hit single "Uptown Funk".

=== Football ===
The phrase "Oops Upside your Head" has been widely repurposed as a football chant in Britain and Ireland.

In Ireland, the melody is famous as the basis for the chant "Ooh, Ahh, Paul McGrath" (paying homage to the Irish international football player). In 1990, a supergroup of Irish musicians (including Zrazy and Paul Cleary) known as Watch Your House released a single titled "Ooh, Ahh, Paul McGrath" to mark Ireland's entry into the World Cup. The single was unable to receive airplay as the sample from the Gap Band had not been cleared. In the early 2010s, the chant was sampled again by an Irish group - this time the Rubberbandits, with their single "Up The Ra".

== Charts ==
=== Weekly charts ===
Chart (1980)	Peak position
Belgium (Ultratop 50 Flanders)	17
Ireland (IRMA)	17
Netherlands (Dutch Top 40)	7
Netherlands (Single Top 100)	4
UK Singles (Official Charts)	6
US Billboard Hot 100	102
US Dance Club Songs (Billboard)	52
US Hot R&B/Hip-Hop Songs (Billboard)	4
West Germany (GfK)	18

=== Year-end charts ===
Chart (1980)	Position
Netherlands (Dutch Top 40)	76
Netherlands (Single Top 100)	51
