= II D Extreme =

American contemporary R&B group

- Origin: Washington, D.C.
- Genres: Hip hop, new jack swing, R&B
- Years active: 1993–1996
- Labels: MCA; Gasoline Alley
- Past members: D'Extra Wiley; Randy Gill; Jermaine Mickey

II D Extreme was an American new jack swing R&B group from the early 1990s that included D'Extra Wiley, Randy Gill (Johnny Gill's brother) and Jermaine Mickey. They are known for the song "Cry No More", and their covers of "Up on the Roof" and the Gap Band's "Outstanding". Their personal manager was Freda Mays.

Alex Henderson, writing for AllMusic, described their second album as a fusion of "hip-hop-type production with a healthy appreciation of the 1970s soul belting of Donny Hathaway and L.T.D. The album is more melodic than rap-focused with Two D Extreme "assert[ing] itself in the production style". Henderson characterized vocal delivery as "gospel-influenced". He summed up some of the songs on the record as not "terribly original or very distinctive", nevertheless "sincere and soulful".

"Cry No More" charted in September 1993, peaking at No. 48 in Billboard Charts.

== Discography ==
Album information
II D Extreme
- Released: November 9, 1993
- Chart positions: #115 US, #22 Top R&B/Hip-Hop Albums
- Singles: "Cry No More", "Up on the Roof", "Let Me Love You"
From I Extreme II Another
- Released: October 29, 1996
- Singles: "If I Knew Then (What I Know Now)", "You Got Me Goin'"
