= Testimony (The Gap Band album) =

Studio album by the Gap Band
- Released: 1994
- Length: 44:13
- Label: Rhino

The Gap Band chronology
| Round Trip (1989) | Testimony (1994) | Ain't Nothin' But a Party (1995) |

Professional ratings
Review scores
| Source | Rating |
|---|---|
| AllMusic | 3/5 stars |
| The Encyclopedia of Popular Music | 2/5 stars |
| (The New) Rolling Stone Album Guide | 2/5 stars |

Testimony is an album by the Gap Band, released in 1994. The album pulled several songs from Charlie Wilson's solo album You Turn My Life Around (1992). None of the songs charted.

== Track listing ==
| # | Title | Writer(s) | Length |
|---|---|---|---|
| 1. | Testimony | Morris Rentie Jr., Jeff Lorber | 5:04 |
| 2. | Confess Your Love | Morris Rentie Jr., Orvalette Rentie | 4:54 |
| 3. | Come into My Love Life | Charlie Wilson, Morris Rentie Jr. | 4:51 |
| 4. | Outside Lookin In | Charlie Wilson, Morris Rentie Jr. | 4:05 |
| 5. | Gap's Jam | Joey Robinson Jr. | 4:11 |
| 6. | Based on G.A.P. | Joey Robinson Jr. | 4:47 |
| 7. | Everybody Knows | Morris Rentie Jr., Jeff Lorber, Charlie Wilson | 4:03 |
| 8. | I Can Make You Dance | Charlie Wilson, Brian Wilson, Andre Wilson, A. Ransom, B. Burks, Joey Robinson Jr. | 5:01 |
| 9. | Gimme Lovin Everyday | Ronnie James Wilson, Raymond Calhoun, Aldyn St. Jon | 3:58 |
| 10. | Funky Bass Man | Morris Rentie Jr. | 3:19 |
