= The Gap Band (1979 album) =

Studio album by the Gap Band
- Released: February 26, 1979
- Recorded: 1978–1979
- Studio: Total Experience Recording Studios (Hollywood)
- Genre: Soul; funk
- Length: 42:15
- Label: Mercury
- Producer: Lonnie Simmons

The Gap Band chronology
The Gap Band (1977)	The Gap Band (1979)	The Gap Band II (1979)

Professional ratings
Review scores
Source	Rating
AllMusic	4/5 stars
The Rolling Stone Album Guide	2/5 stars

The Gap Band is the major label debut album by the Gap Band, released in 1979 on Mercury Records. It is the group's second self-titled album, and their third album overall. It reached number ten on the Billboard Top Soul Albums chart.

== Track listing ==
#	Title	Writer(s)	Length
1.	Shake	Charlie Wilson	4:57
2.	You Can Count on Me	Buddy Jones, Charlie Wilson	4:59
3.	Open Up Your Mind (Wide)	Charlie Wilson, Ronnie Wilson	7:08
4.	Messin' with My Mind	Charlie Wilson, Rick Calhoun, Robert Louis Whitfield	4:12
5.	Baby Baba Boogie	Charlie Wilson, Lonnie Simmons, Ronnie Wilson	6:36
6.	I'm in Love	Ronnie Wilson	5:25
7.	Got to Get Away	Robert Lynn Wilson	3:48
8.	I Can Sing	Charlie Wilson, Ronnie Wilson	5:18

== Charts ==
Chart (1979)	Peak position
Billboard Pop Albums	77
Billboard Top Soul Albums	10

=== Singles ===
Year	Single	Chart positions	
Year	Single	US R&B	US Disco
1979	"Baby Baba Boogie"	-	48
1979	"Shake"	4	-
