= Yearning for Your Love =

- One of side-A labels of the US single

Single by the Gap Band

from the album The Gap Band III
- B-side: "Oops Up Side Your Head"; "Burn Rubber on Me (Why You Wanna Hurt Me)"; "Humpin'"; "When I Look In Your Eyes"
- Released: January 1981
- Genre: Quiet storm
- Length: 3:59 (single edit); 5:43 (album version)
- Label: Mercury
- Songwriters: Oliver Scott; Ronnie Wilson

The Gap Band singles chronology
"Humpin'" (1980)	"Yearning for Your Love" (1981)	"Early in the Morning" (1982)

"Yearning for Your Love" is a 1980 ballad recorded and released by the Gap Band on Mercury Records. The single was the third release off the band's fifth album, The Gap Band III (1980). Four different singles, each with a different B-side, were released in 1981.

The song became a modest hit on the US and UK charts when it was released; it arose to number 5 on the Hot Soul Singles chart and number 60 on the Billboard Hot 100. Written by Gap Band keyboardist Oliver Scott and keyboardist Ronnie Wilson, it was a romantic love song dedicated to Wilson's wife at the time and was performed by Ronnie's brother Charlie Wilson.

== Structure ==
The song was markedly different in style from the past few hits, with less emphasis on synthesizers, instead on "light slices of guitar, smooth keyboard pads and soft percussion".

== Releases ==
1. "Yearning for Your Love" / "Burn Rubber"
2. "Yearning for Your Love" / "Humpin'"
3. "Yearning for Your Love" / "When I Look in Your Eyes"
4. "Yearning for Your Love" / "Oops Upside Your Head"

== Personnel ==
- Lead vocals by Charlie Wilson
- Background vocals by Oliver Scott, Ronnie Wilson and Robert Wilson
- Drums by Ronnie Kaufman
- Guitars by Fred Jenkins, Glenn Nightingale
- Bass by Robert Wilson
- Synthesizers by Ronnie Wilson
- Keyboards by Oliver Scott

== Charts ==
Chart (1981)	Peak position
US Billboard Hot 100	60
US Hot Soul Singles Chart	5

== Famous cover versions ==
In 1990, Guy also covered the song on their 1990 album, The Future.

In 2001, keyboardist Kevin Toney covered the song on his album Strut. The song featured Evelyn "Champagne" King on vocals.
