= The Gap Band (1977 album) =

Studio album by the Gap Band
- Released: 1977
- Recorded: 1977
- Genre: Soul; funk
- Length: 35:46
- Label: Tattoo; RCA
- Producer: John Ryan

The Gap Band chronology
Magicians Holiday (1974)	The Gap Band (1977)	The Gap Band (1979)

Professional ratings
Review scores
Source	Rating
AllMusic	2.5/5 stars

The Gap Band is the second album by the Gap Band in 1977 on Tattoo/RCA Records. This is not to be confused with the 1979 Mercury Records self-titled album.

== Track listing ==
Side one
No.	Title	Writer(s)	Length
1.	"Out of the Blue (Can You Feel It)"	Charles Wilson	3:26
2.	"Stand Up and Dance with Me"	Charles Wilson, Ronnie Wilson	4:15
3.	"Not Guilty"	Robert Wilson, Charles Wilson	4:18
4.	"God Is Watching You"	Charles Wilson, Robert Wilson	5:05

Side two
No.	Title	Writer(s)	Length
5.	"Little Bit of Love"	Paul Kossoff, Simon Kirke, Paul Rodgers, Andy Fraser	2:58
6.	"Hang On (To Yourself)"	Robert Wilson, Ronnie Wilson, Charles Wilson	3:18
7.	"Knuckle Head Funkin'"	Robert Wilson, Tommy Lokey	3:48
8.	"Thinking of You"	Ronnie Wilson, Tommy Lokey	4:10
9.	"Silly Grin"	Robert Wilson, Ronnie Wilson, Charles Wilson	4:28

== Personnel ==
- Charles Wilson – keyboards, lead vocals
- Robert Wilson – bass, vocals
- Ronnie Wilson – trumpet, electric piano, vocals
- James Macon – guitar
- Tommy Lokey – trumpet
- Chris Clayton – alto and tenor saxophone, vocals
- The Gap Band – percussion, backing vocals
- Rick Calhoun – drums
- Leon Russell – piano
- Chaka Khan, D.J. Rogers, Mary Russell, Johnny Lee Samuels – backing vocals
- The Cornerstone Institutional Baptist and Southern Californian Community Choir – choir
- Reverend James Cleveland – choir director
- Les McCann – keyboards
- Jesse Ehrlich – cello
- Jerry Jumonville – alto saxophone
- Gino Piserchio, Robert Margouleff – synthesizer

== Charts ==
Singles

Year	Single	Peak chart positions
Year	Single	US R&B
1977	"Out of the Blue (Can You Feel It)"	42
1977	"Little Bit of Love"	95
