= Alive and Well =

Alive and Well may refer to:

- Alive and Well (Quiet Riot album), 1999, or the title song
- Alive and Well... In Krakow, a 2004 live DVD by Green Carnation
- Alive & Well: Recorded in Paris, a 1978 album by the band Soft Machine
- Alive & Well (Mucky Pup album)
- Alive & Well AIDS Alternatives, a 501(c) non-profit organization of AIDS denialists
- Jacques Brel is Alive and Well and Living in Paris
