= Straight from the Heart (The Gap Band album) =

Studio album by The Gap Band
- Released: 1988
- Studio: Total Experience Recording Studios (Hollywood, California)
- Genre: R&B, funk
- Length: 39:43
- Label: Total Experience

The Gap Band chronology
Gap Band 8 (1986)	Straight from the Heart (1988)	Round Trip (1989)

Professional ratings
Review scores
Source	Rating
AllMusic	link

Straight from the Heart is the 11th album by the Gap Band, released in 1988 on Total Experience Records (their final release for the label). The album includes the single "Straight from the Heart", while the song "Sweeter Than Candy" was featured in the film Penitentiary 3.

== Track listing ==
#	Title	Writer(s)	Length
1.	Come & Dance	Charlie Wilson, Dorian Williams, Ronnie Wilson	6:06
2.	Sweeter Than Candy	Charlie Wilson, Raymond Calhoun, Roman Johnson, Ronnie Wilson	5:00
3.	All the Way Yours	Jimmy Hamilton, Rick Adams	4:47
4.	I'm So Satisfied	Oliver Scott	5:01
5.	Straight from the Heart	Greg C. Jackson	4:54
6.	That's It, I Quit	Charlie Wilson, Ronnie Wilson	5:04
7.	You Told Me That	Jimmy Hamilton, Raymond Calhoun	4:13
8.	I Will Never Leave You	Dorian Williams, Lonnie Simmons, Rudy Taylor	4:38
