= All of My Love (The Gap Band song) =

Single by The Gap Band

from the album Round Trip (The Gap Band album)
- B-side: "All of My Love" (various mixes)
- Released: October 24, 1989
- Genre: New jack swing
- Length: 5:10
- Label: Capitol
- Songwriters: Raymond Calhoun, John Black, Ronnie Wilson
- Producers: Charlie Wilson, Raymond Calhoun

The Gap Band singles chronology
"I'm Gonna Git You Sucka" (1988)	"All of My Love" (1989)	"Addicted to Your Love" (1990)

"All of My Love" is a 1989 single by The Gap Band. The single was their first release on the Capitol label and was the group's last single to make it to number one on the Hot Black singles chart. "All of My Love" did not chart on the Hot 100.

== Chart positions ==
Chart (1989–90)	Peak position
US Billboard Hot Black Singles	1
UK Singles Chart	88
