= Y2K: Funkin' Till 2000 Comz =

Studio album by the Gap Band
- Released: 1999
- Genre: R&B, funk, soul
- Length: 56:41
- Label: Eagle Records

The Gap Band chronology
Ain't Nothin' But a Party (1995)	Y2K: Funkin' Till 2000 Comz (1999)

Professional ratings
Review scores
Source	Rating
AllMusic	2.5/5 stars

Y2K: Funkin' Till 2000 Comz is the 14th and final album by the Gap Band, released in 1999 on Eagle Records.

== Track listing ==
#	Title	Writer(s)	Length
1.	Funkin' Till 2000 Comz	Charlie Wilson, DJ Quik, Ira Gilroy, Michael Paran, Robert Wilson, Ronnie Wilson, Snoop Dogg, Wayman Starks	5:18
2.	Baby I Remember Your Face	Andre Wilson, Brian Wilson, Casey Wilson, Kurrupt	4:29
3.	Good Old Fashion Lovin'	Ira Gilroy, Michael Paran, Robert Wilson, Ronnie Wilson	4:24
4.	Untouchable	Andre Wilson, Brian Wilson, Casey Wilson	5:26
5.	Scandalous	Andre Wilson, Brian Wilson, Casey Wilson, Charlie Wilson, Ira Gilroy, Michael Paran, Ronnie Wilson, Wayman Starks	3:52
6.	No Color Lines	Charlie Wilson, Ira Gilroy, Michael Paran	4:26
7.	Messin' with My Flow	Andre Wilson, Brian Wilson, Charlie Wilson, Ira Gilroy, Michael Paran, Ronnie Wilson, Wayman Starks	5:14
8.	For the People	Andre Wilson, Anthony Ransom, Collins, Gene Jr., Ronnie Wilson	5:24
9.	Style & Grace	Andre Wilson, Brian Wilson, Casey Wilson, Philip Johnson	4:10
10.	Otta' Be Like This	Charlie Wilson, Robert Wilson, Ronnie Wilson	4:09
11.	Good Old Fashion Lovin' [*][AC Mix]	Ira Gilroy, Michael Paran, Robert Wilson, Ronnie Wilson	4:26
12.	Funkin' Till 2000 Comz [Millennium Mix]	Charlie Wilson, DJ Quik, Ira Gilroy, Michael Paran, Robert Wilson, Ronnie Wilson, Snoop Dogg, Wayman Starks	5:23
