= Magicians Holiday =

Studio album by The Gap Band
- Released: 1974
- Studio: Shelter Church Studio (Tulsa, Oklahoma)
- Genre: Soul, funk
- Length: 35:42
- Label: Shelter
- Producer: Buddy Jones

The Gap Band chronology
Magicians Holiday (1974)	The Gap Band (1977)

Professional ratings
Review scores
Source	Rating
Allmusic	2/5 stars

Magicians Holiday is the debut album by The Gap Band in 1974 on Shelter Records.

== Track listing ==
All tracks are written by Buddy Jones and Charles Wilson, except where noted
All tracks arranged by The Gap Band.

Side one
No.	Title	Writer(s)	Length
1.	"I-Yike-It"	Tom Lokey	2:46
2.	"Backbone"		2:36
3.	"After All Is Said and Done"		3:25
4.	"Fontessa Fame"		4:30
5.	"You Can Always Count on Me"		5:00

Side two
No.	Title	Writer(s)	Length
6.	"Bad Girl"		3:30
7.	"Easy Life"	Buddy Jones, Kay Poorboy	3:50
8.	"Loving You Is Everything"		3:40
9.	"Tommy's Groove"	Tom Lokey	3:32
10.	"Magicians Holiday"		2:53

== Personnel ==
The Gap Band

- Charles Wilson – lead vocals, backing vocals, piano, Clavinet, organ
- Ronnie Wilson – backing vocals, trumpet
- Robert Wilson – backing vocals, bass
- Roscoe Smith – drums
- O'Dell Stokes – guitar
- Tommy Lokey – trumpet
- Alvin Jones – trombone
- Chris Clayton – saxophone
- Carl Scoggins – congas, percussions

with:

- Jamie Oldaker – drums on "Easy Life"
- Wayne Perkins – guitar on "Bad Girl" and "Loving You Is Everything"
- Tuck Andress – guitar on "Tommy's Groove"

Technical

- Kirk Bressler – engineer
- Malcolm Cecil, Robert Margouleff – remixing engineer
- Tom Wilkes – album design, front cover photography

== Samples ==
- "Tommy's Groove"
  - "Ragtime"" by Brand Nubian on their One For All album.
