= Round Trip (The Gap Band album) =

Studio album by the Gap Band
- Released: 1989
- Genre: R&B
- Length: 50:33
- Label: Capitol

The Gap Band chronology
Straight from the Heart (1988)	Round Trip (1989)	Testimony (1994)

Professional ratings
Review scores
Source	Rating
AllMusic	2/5 stars

Round Trip is an album by the Gap Band, released on November 14, 1989, on Capitol and EMI Records. The album includes the singles "All of My Love" (which hit number one on the American R&B chart) and "Addicted to Your Love".

== Track listing ==
#	Title	Writer(s)	Length
1.	All of My Love	Ronnie James Wilson, Aldyn St. Jon, Raymond Calhoun	4:53
2.	Addicted To Your Love	Roman Johnson, Ronnie James Wilson, Charles Wilson, Aldyn St. Jon	5:10
3.	We Can Make It Alright	Ross Vannelli, Ronnie James Wilson, Charles Wilson	4:48
4.	It's Our Duty	Roman Johnson, Charles Wilson, Aldyn St. Jon, Ronnie James Wilson	4:44
5.	Wednesday Lover	Roman Johnson, Charles Wilson, Aldyn St. Jon, Ronnie James Wilson	4:57
6.	I Like It	Roman Johnson, Ronnie James Wilson, Raymond Calhoun, Aldyn St. Jon, Charles Wilson	5:22
7.	I'm Dreaming	Brian Kerry, Steve Batte, Charles Wilson, Ronnie James Wilson, Aldyn St. Jon	4:41
8.	Antidote (To Love)	Ronnie James Wilson, Charles Wilson, Ross Vannelli	3:26
9.	No Easy Out	Ronnie James Wilson, Raymond Calhoun, Aldyn St. Jon	4:10
10.	Jam	Charles Wilson, Raymond Calhoun, Anthony "Krazy Tee" Ransom, Dorian Williams, Aldyn St. Jon	3:58
11.	Let's Talk About Love	Ronnie James Wilson, Ross Vannelli, Roman Johnson, Charles Wilson	4:24

== Charts ==
=== Weekly charts ===
Chart (1989–1990)	Peak position
US Billboard 200	189
US Top R&B/Hip-Hop Albums (Billboard)	20

=== Year-end charts ===
Chart (1990)	Position
US Top R&B/Hip-Hop Albums (Billboard)	45
