= Gap Band VI =

Studio album by The Gap Band
- Released: December 6, 1984
- Studio: Total Experience Recording Studios (Hollywood, California)
- Genre: R&B, funk
- Length: 42:32
- Label: Total Experience (original release); Big Break Records (Expanded CD reissue)

The Gap Band chronology
Gap Band V: Jammin' (1983)	Gap Band VI (1984)	Gap Band VII (1985)

Professional ratings
Review scores
Source	Rating
AllMusic	link

Gap Band VI is the eighth album (contrary to the title) by the Gap Band, released in 1984 on Total Experience Records. It was originally intended to be lead singer Charlie Wilson's first solo album, and the first Gap Band album released under Total Experience's new distribution deal with RCA Records. The album reached #1 on the Black Albums chart for 2 weeks in March 1985. On October 29, 2012 the remastered and expanded album including 5 bonus tracks was released by Big Break Records.

== Track listing ==
#	Title	Writer(s)	Length
1.	The Sun Don't Shine Everyday (Instrumental Interlude)	Lonnie Simmons, Rudy Taylor	1:10
2.	Video Junkie	Charlie Wilson, Jimmy Hamilton, Lonnie Simmons, Maurice Hayes, Rudy Taylor, Demetrius Johnson	6:07
3.	Weak Spot	Oliver Scott	3:59
4.	The Sun Don't Shine Everyday (Instrumental Interlude)	Lonnie Simmons, Rudy Taylor	0:41
5.	I Believe	Lonnie Simmons, Rudy Taylor	4:48
6.	I Found My Baby	Raymond Calhoun	4:41
7.	Beep a Freak	Charlie Wilson, Lonnie Simmons, Rudy Taylor	6:25
8.	Don't You Leave Me	Oliver Scott	4:50
9.	Disrespect	Charlie Wilson	4:30
10.	The Sun Don't Shine Every Day (Vocal)	Lonnie Simmons, Rudy Taylor	5:09
11.*	Beep a Freak (12" Long Version)	Charlie Wilson, Lonnie Simmons, Rudy Taylor	7:48
12.*	I Found My Baby (12" Club/Dance Mix)	Jonah Ellis, Lamont Johnson, Lonnie Simmons	7:06
13.*	Disrespect (12" Club Mix)	Lamont Johnson, Lonnie Simmons	7:27
14.*	Beep a Freak (12" Special Dance Mix)	Charlie Wilson, Lonnie Simmons, Rudy Taylor	7:51
15.*	I Found My Baby (12" Remix With Breakdown)	Jonah Ellis, Lamont Johnson, Lonnie Simmons	5:18

(*) Bonus tracks on the remastered version

== Personnel ==
Artist:

- Charlie Wilson - Keyboards, Synthesizer, Percussion, Lead and Backing Vocals
- Ronnie Wilson - Trumpet, Keyboards, Backing Vocals
- Robert Wilson - Bass, Backing Vocals

Musicians:

- Oliver Scott
- Fred Jenkins
- Billy Young
- Glenn Nightingale
- Raymond Calhoun
- Lonnie Simmons
- Rudy Taylor
- Jimmy Hamilton
- Maurice Hayes
- Ira Ward
- Robert "Goodie" Whitfield
