= You Dropped a Bomb on Me =

1982 single by the Gap Band

- A-side label of US 12-inch vinyl release

Single by the Gap Band

from the album Gap Band IV
- B-side: "Lonely Like Me"; "Humpin'"; "Early in the Morning"
- Released: August 1982
- Genre: Synth-funk
- Length: 5:13 (album version and 12-inch single); 4:05 (single edit); 13:07 (special disco mix)
- Label: Total Experience
- Songwriters: Lonnie Simmons; Rudy Taylor; Charlie Wilson
- Producer: Lonnie Simmons

The Gap Band singles chronology
"Early in the Morning" (1982)	"You Dropped a Bomb on Me" (1982)	"Outstanding" (1983)

Audio sample
- "You Dropped A Bomb On Me": file; help

"You Dropped a Bomb on Me" is a funk song performed by American R&B and funk band the Gap Band, released in August 1982 on producer Lonnie Simmons's label, Total Experience Records. In addition to the single release, it was included on the band's sixth album, Gap Band IV (1982). It reached No. 2 on the US Billboard Hot Black Singles chart, No. 39 on the Billboard Dance/Disco Top 80, and No. 31 on the Billboard Hot 100. In 2022, Rolling Stone ranked "You Dropped a Bomb on Me" No. 96 in their list of the "200 Greatest Dance Songs of All Time".

The song prominently features a synthesizer performed by studio musician John Barnes that imitates the whistling sound of an aerial bomb being dropped. This is first heard once immediately before the first verse, and repeats throughout the song from the fourth chorus onward. The song also features timpani drum rolls.

A long-standing rumor claimed that "You Dropped a Bomb on Me" was inspired by the Tulsa race massacre, during which bombs were dropped on black neighborhoods and businesses. Tulsa is the Gap Band's hometown. In 2021, 100 years after the massacre, Gap Band frontman Charlie Wilson confirmed that the rumor was false, although he did express appreciation that it brought attention to the historical event.

In the aftermath of the September 11 attacks, the song was one of those named on the 2001 Clear Channel memorandum of "lyrically questionable" songs.

The song was used in season one, episode two “Remember Charlie Wilson?” in “Family Reunion”. Charlie Wilson starred in the episode where (fictionally) he wrote the song about the character M’Dear.

== Charts ==
Chart (1982)	Peak position
US Billboard Hot 100	31
US Dance/Disco Top 80 (Billboard)	39
US Hot Black Singles (Billboard)	2

Chart (1994)	Peak position
Iceland (Íslenski Listinn Topp 40)	27
