= Gap Band 8 =

Studio album by The Gap Band
- Released: 1986
- Studio: Total Experience Recording Studios (Hollywood, California)
- Genre: R&B, funk
- Length: 39:21
- Label: Total Experience (original release); Big Break Records (expanded CD reissue)

The Gap Band chronology
Gap Band VII (1985)	Gap Band 8 (1986)	Straight from the Heart (1987)

Professional ratings
Review scores
Source	Rating
AllMusic	link

Gap Band 8 is the 10th album (contrary to the title) by American R&B and funk band the Gap Band, released in 1986 on Total Experience Records. It is the first (and only) album in the band's self-titled series to be subtitled with a regular number instead of a Roman numeral, as well as their final self-titled album.

The album includes the singles "Big Fun", "How Music Came About" and "Zibble, Zibble (Get the Money)" (also known as "Get Loose, Get Funky"). The album was expanded and remastered in 2011 by Big Break Records including 6 additional bonus tracks.

== Track listing ==
#	Title	Writer(s)	Length
1.	Big Fun	Lonnie Simmons, Rudy Taylor	6:49
2.	I Can't Live Without Your Love	Jimmy Hamilton, Rick Adams	4:36
3.	Get Loose, Get Funky	Charlie Wilson, Morris Rente, Rudy Taylor	5:26
4.	Don't Take It Away	Oliver Scott	4:04
5.	Keep Holding On	Oliver Scott	4:23
6.	I'll Always Love You	Dorian Williams	3:59
7.	Bop B Da B Da Da (How Music Came About)	John Black	4:36
8.	I Owe It To Myself	Jimmy Hamilton, Maurice Hayes, Ted Rabb	4:35
9.*	Big Fun [Mega Mix][Bonus Track]	Lonnie Simmons, Rudy Taylor	8:42
10.*	Zibble, Zibble (Get the Money) (AKA: Get Loose, Get Funky) [Dub-Zibble Money Mix][Bonus Track]	Charlie Wilson, Morris Rente, Rudy Taylor	5:40
11.*	Bop B Da B Da Da (How Music Came About) [Extended Version][Bonus Track]	John Black	5:42
12.*	I Owe It To Myself [Remix][Bonus Track]	Jimmy Hamilton, Maurice Hayes, Ted Rabb	6:34
13.*	Big Fun [Serious Dub Mix][Bonus Track]	Lonnie Simmons, Rudy Taylor	7:09
14.*	Big Fun [Bandolero Mix][Bonus Track]	Lonnie Simmons, Rudy Taylor	7:06

(*) Bonus tracks on the remastered version
