= The Gap Band III =

Gap Band III

Studio album by the Gap Band
- Released: December 8, 1980
- Recorded: 1980
- Studio: Total Experience Recording Studios (Hollywood)
- Genre: Soul; funk
- Length: 44:45
- Label: Mercury; PTG
- Producer: Lonnie Simmons

The Gap Band chronology
The Gap Band II (1979)	Gap Band III (1980)	Gap Band IV (1982)

The Gap Band III is the fifth studio album (contrary to the title) by American R&B band the Gap Band, released in 1980 on Mercury Records. It was produced by Lonnie Simmons. It was their first album to achieve platinum status. The album was reissued in a remastered edition by PTG Records in 2009.

== Reception ==
Professional ratings
Review scores
Source	Rating
AllMusic	4.5/5 stars
Rolling Stone	(favorable)
The Rolling Stone Album Guide	3/5 stars

The album reached No. 1 on the Black Albums chart and No. 16 on the Billboard Hot 200. The album yielded 3 charting singles: the No. 60 R&B song "Humpin'", "Yearning for Your Love", a No. 5 R&B single which peaked at No. 60 on the Billboard Hot 100, and the No. 1 R&B hit "Burn Rubber (Why You Wanna Hurt Me)", which reached No. 19 on the dance chart and No. 84 on the Hot 100.

This would be the group's final release by Mercury Records (via Total Experience Productions). The Gap Band's next six albums were released on Total Experience Records.

== Track listing ==
No.	Title	Writer(s)	Length
1.	"When I Look in Your Eyes"	Lonnie Simmons, Rudy Taylor, Wilmer Raglin	4:59
2.	"Yearning for Your Love"	Oliver Scott, Ronnie Wilson	5:42
3.	"Burn Rubber (Why You Wanna Hurt Me)"	Charlie Wilson, Lonnie Simmons, Rudy Taylor	5:30
4.	"Nothin' Comes to Sleepers"	Oliver Scott, Ronnie Wilson	5:33
5.	"Are You Living"	Charlie Wilson, John Black	4:23
6.	"Sweet Caroline"	Charlie Wilson, Malvin Vice	3:20
7.	"Humpin'"	Charlie Wilson, Lonnie Simmons, Ronnie Wilson, Rudy Taylor	5:13
8.	"The Way"	Oliver Scott, Ronnie Wilson	4:47
9.	"Gash Gash Gash"	Robert Wilson	5:18
10.	"Burn Rubber (Why You Wanna Hurt Me) [Radio Version]"	Charlie Wilson, Lonnie Simmons, Rudy Taylor	4:09

== Personnel ==
- Charlie Wilson - Keyboards, Synthesizer, Percussion, Lead and Backing Vocals
- Ronnie Wilson - Trumpet, Keyboards, Backing Vocals
- Robert Wilson - Bass, Backing Vocals (Lead vocals on "Gash Gash Gash")
- Oliver Scott - Horns, Keyboards, Synthesizer, Backing Vocals
- Raymond Calhoun - Drums, Percussion, Backing Vocals
- Melvin Webb, Ronnie Kaufman - Drums
- John Black - Keyboards, Backing Vocals
- Malvin "Dino" Vice - String Arrangements, Backing Vocals
- Cavin Yarbrough - Synthesizer
- Robert "Goodie" Whitfield - Keyboards
- Fred Jenkins - Guitar
- Glen Nightingale - Guitar
- Marlo Henderson - Guitar
- Wilmer Raglin - Horns, Backing Vocals
- Earl Roberson - Horns
- Katie Kilpatrick - Harp
- The Gap Band, Howard Huntsberry, Jonah Ellis, Marva King, Maxanne Lewis, Rudy Taylor, Val Young, Lonnie Simmons, Malvin "Dino" Vice - Backing Vocals

== Charts ==
Chart (1981)	Peak position
Billboard Pop Albums	16
Billboard Top Soul Albums	1

=== Singles ===
Year	Single	Chart positions		
Year	Single	US Pop	US R&B	US Disco
1981	"Burn Rubber (Why You Wanna Hurt Me)"	84	1	19
1981	"Yearning for Your Love"	60	5	-
1981	"Humpin'"	-	60	-

== See also ==
- List of number-one R&B albums of 1981 (U.S.)
