= The Gap Band II =

Studio album by the Gap Band
- Released: November 19, 1979
- Recorded: 1979
- Studio: Total Experience (Hollywood)
- Genre: Soul; funk
- Length: 38:52
- Label: Mercury
- Producer: Lonnie Simmons

The Gap Band chronology
The Gap Band (1979)	The Gap Band II (1979)	The Gap Band III (1980)

The Gap Band II is the fourth studio album by the Gap Band, released in 1979 on Mercury Records. It is their second major label release, and produced by Lonnie Simmons.

== Reception ==
Professional ratings
Review scores
Source	Rating
AllMusic	4.5/5 stars
The Rolling Stone Album Guide	2.5/5 stars

The album reached No. 3 on the Black Albums chart and No. 42 on the Pop Albums chart. The album produced the singles "Steppin' (Out)" (No. 10 Black Singles), "Party Lights" (No. 36 Black Singles), and "I Don't Believe You Want to Get up and Dance (Oops!)" (No. 4 Black Singles, No. 52 Club Play Singles).

The album established the Gap Band as leaders in the R&B market, becoming their first gold album, selling over 500,000 copies through 1980. The album's most successful track, "I Don't Believe You Want to Get up and Dance (Oops!)", was their first to incorporate aspects of the P-Funk sound. The song also alludes to a well-known corruption of the childhood nursery rhyme, Jack and Jill (a pattern later continued on "Humpin'").

== Track listing ==
#	Title	Writer(s)	Length
1.	"Steppin' (Out)"	Charlie Wilson, Lonnie Simmons, Ronnie Wilson	4:25
2.	"No Hiding Place"	Charlie Wilson, Lonnie Simmons, Ronnie Wilson	5:34
3.	"I Don't Believe You Want to Get Up and Dance (Oops!)"	Charlie Wilson, Lonnie Simmons, Robert Wilson, Ronnie Wilson, Rudolph Taylor	8:39
4.	"Who Do You Call"	Charlie Wilson, Lonnie Simmons, Robert Wilson, Ronnie Wilson	4:57
5.	"You Are My High"	Charlie Wilson, Johnsye Smith, Ronnie Wilson	5:38
6.	"Party Lights"	Charlie Wilson, Lonnie Simmons, Ronnie Wilson, Rudolph Taylor	3:54
7.	"The Boys Are Back in Town"	Charlie Wilson, Malvin Dino Vice, Lonnie Simmons	5:45

== Personnel ==
- Charlie Wilson – keyboards, synthesizer, percussion, lead vocals, backing vocals
- Ronnie Wilson – trumpet, keyboards, backing vocals
- Robert Wilson – bass, backing vocals, lead vocals (on "Who Do You Call")
- Greg Phillinganes – keyboards, percussion, synthesizer
- John Black – keyboards
- Louie Cabaza – keyboards
- Emzie Parker III – guitar
- Glenn Nightingale – guitar
- James Macon – guitar
- Raymond Calhoun – drums, percussion
- Ronnie Kaufman – drums
- Malvin "Dino" Vice – trumpet, backing vocals, horn arrangements
- Oliver "Gussie" Scott – trombone, backing vocals
- Benjamin Wright – string arrangements
- Bernard Baisden – trombone
- Fernando Harkless – tenor saxophone
- Lois Peoples – backing vocals
- Angela Smith – backing vocals
- Calvin Yarbrough – backing vocals
- Gail Johnson – backing vocals
- Howard Huntsberry – backing vocals
- Robert "Goodie" Whitfield – backing vocals
- Rudolph Taylor – backing vocals

== Charts ==
=== Weekly charts ===
Chart (1980)	Peak position
US Billboard 200	42
US Top R&B/Hip-Hop Albums (Billboard)	3

=== Year-end charts ===
Chart (1980)	Position
US Top R&B Albums (Billboard)	13

=== Singles ===
Year	Single	Chart positions	
Year	Single	US R&B	US Disco
1980	"I Don't Believe You Want to Get up and Dance (Oops!)"	4	52
1980	"Party Lights"	36	-
1980	"Steppin' (Out)"	10	-
