= Gap Band V: Jammin' =

Studio album by the Gap Band
- Released: August 22, 1983
- Recorded: 1983
- Studio: Total Experience Recording Studios (Hollywood)
- Genres: R&B; funk
- Length: 46:55
- Label: Total Experience
- Producers: Ronnie Wilson; Lonnie Simmons

The Gap Band chronology
Gap Band IV (1982)	Gap Band V: Jammin' (1983)	Gap Band VI (1984)

Professional ratings
Review scores
Source	Rating
AllMusic	3/5 stars
Robert Christgau	B+
The Encyclopedia of Popular Music	3/5 stars
The Rolling Stone Album Guide	3/5 stars

Gap Band V: Jammin' is the seventh studio album by the Gap Band, released in 1983 on Total Experience Records. The album was reissued on CD in 1997 by Mercury Records. In 2009, the album was remastered by PTG Records.

The album reached #2 on the Black Albums chart and #28 on the Pop Albums chart. The album produced the singles "Party Train" (#3 R&B) and "Jam the Motha'" (#16 R&B). Other less successful singles include "Shake A Leg", "I'm Ready (If You're Ready)" (which were both released as remixes); and the UK-only singles "Jammin' In America" and "Someday". To date, it is the Gap Band's last gold album.

== Production ==
With the exception of "Party Train" and "Smile" (which were co-produced by label owner Lonnie Simmons), the album was produced by oldest brother Ronnie Wilson.

== Critical reception ==
Robert Christgau wrote: "Like Cameo and Rick James before them, these old pros blew their sure shots on the breakthrough--this drops no bombs. But once again the follow-up album compensates for never getting up by never letting up--the uptempo stuff steadfastly maintains their hand-stamped party groove, and like Cameo (forget Rick James), they've figured out what to do with the slow ones."

== Track listing ==
#	Title	Writer(s)	Length
1.	Introduction - Where Are We Going? (Instrumental)	Oliver Scott	1:35
2.	Shake a Leg	Charlie Wilson, Ronnie Wilson, Rudy Taylor	3:58
3.	I'm Ready (If You're Ready)	Charlie Wilson, Jimmy Hamilton, Maurice Hayes Nestor	5:12
4.	You're My Everything	Ronnie Wilson	4:13
5.	Jammin' in America	Bernard Spears, Ronnie Wilson	4:59
6.	Smile	Oliver Scott, Ronnie Wilson	3:02
7.	Party Train	Charlie Wilson, Lonnie Simmons, Ronnie Wilson, Rudy Taylor	5:50
8.	Jam the Motha'	Charlie Wilson, Robert Wilson, Rudy Taylor	4:18
9.	I Expect More	Fred Jenkins, Kenny Rich, Ronnie Wilson	3:54
10.	You're Something Special	Ronnie Wilson	5:20
11.	Someday (featuring Stevie Wonder)	Billy Young, Ronnie Wilson	4:34
12.	Party Train [Special Dance Mix][Bonus Track]	Charlie Wilson, Lonnie Simmons, Ronnie Wilson, Rudy Taylor	7:28

== Charts ==
=== Weekly charts ===
Chart (1983)	Peak position
US Billboard 200	28
US Top R&B/Hip-Hop Albums (Billboard)	2

=== Year-end charts ===
Chart (1984)	Position
US Top R&B/Hip-Hop Albums (Billboard)	18
