= Gap Band IV =

Studio album by the Gap Band
- Released: May 17, 1982
- Recorded: 1981–1982
- Studio: Total Experience Recording Studios (Hollywood)
- Genre: R&B; soul; funk
- Length: 42:05
- Label: Total Experience
- Producer: Lonnie Simmons

The Gap Band chronology
The Gap Band III (1980)	Gap Band IV (1982)	Gap Band V: Jammin' (1983)

Singles from Gap Band IV
- 1. "Early in the Morning" Released: April 1982; 2. "You Dropped a Bomb on Me" Released: August 1982; 3. "Outstanding" Released: November 1982

Professional ratings
Review scores
Source	Rating
AllMusic	4.5/5 stars
Robert Christgau	B+

Gap Band IV is the sixth studio album by the Gap Band, released in 1982 on Total Experience Records. The album reached No. 1 on the Black Albums chart and No. 14 on the Pop Albums chart, achieved platinum status, and is considered their most successful project.

The album produced the singles "Early in the Morning" (#1 Black Singles, #13 Club Play Singles, #24 Pop Singles), "You Dropped a Bomb on Me" (#2 Black Singles, #39 Club Play Singles, #31 Pop Singles), and "Outstanding" (#1 Black Singles, #24 Club Play Singles, #51 Pop Singles). It also achieved a rare feat in which every song on the album received radio airplay.

It was the first album producer Lonnie Simmons released directly on his label, Total Experience Records. The album was reissued on CD in 1994 by Mercury Records.

== Track listing ==
No.	Title	Writer(s)	Length
1.	"Early in the Morning"	Charlie Wilson, Lonnie Simmons, Rudy Taylor	6:30
2.	"Season's No Reason to Change"	Lonnie Simmons, Ronnie Wilson	4:49
3.	"Lonely Like Me"	Lonnie Simmons, Ronnie Wilson, Rudy Taylor	5:21
4.	"Outstanding"	Raymond Calhoun	3:18
5.	"Stay with Me"	Ronnie Wilson	4:11
6.	"You Dropped a Bomb on Me"	Charlie Wilson, Lonnie Simmons, Rudy Taylor	5:10
7.	"I Can't Get Over You"	Charlie Wilson, Lonnie Simmons, Ronnie Wilson	6:02
8.	"Talkin' Back"	Charlie Wilson, Lonnie Simmons, Robert Wilson, Ronnie Wilson, Rudy Taylor	6:42

== Personnel ==
- Charlie Wilson – Keyboards, Synthesizer, Percussion, Lead and Backing Vocals
- Ronnie Wilson – Trumpet, Flugelhorn, Keyboards, Synthesizer, Percussion, Backing Vocals
- Robert Wilson – Bass, Guitar, Percussion, Backing Vocals
- Oliver Scott – Horns, Synthesizer, Keyboards
- Raymond Calhoun – Drums, Percussion
- Melvin Webb, Ronnie Kaufman – Drums
- Dionne Oliver – Bass
- Fred Jenkins, Glen Nightingale, Jimi Macon – Guitar
- Robert "Goodie" Whitfield, Louis Cabaza – Keyboards, Synthesizer
- Wilmer Raglin – Horns, Backing Vocals
- Andy Ward, Earl Roberson, Larry Stone – Horns
- David Drew, Marva King, Maxayn Lewis, Alisa Peoples, Calvin Yarbrough, Lonnie Simmons, Rudy Taylor, Sheila Young, Val Young – Backing Vocals

== Charts ==
Chart (1982)	Peak position
Billboard Pop Albums	14
Billboard Top Soul Albums	1

=== Singles ===
Year	Single	Chart positions		
Year	Single	US Pop	US R&B	US Disco
1982	"Early in the Morning"	24	1	13
1982	"You Dropped a Bomb on Me"	31	2	39
1983	"Outstanding"	51	1	24

== See also ==
- List of Billboard number-one R&B albums of 1982
