= Party Train =

Single by The Gap Band

from the album Gap Band V: Jammin'
- B-side: "Party Train (The Special Dance Mix"
- Released: August 13, 1983
- Recorded: 1982
- Genre: Electrofunk, dance-rock
- Length: 5:50
- Label: Total Experience
- Songwriters: Charlie Wilson, Ronnie Wilson, Lonnie Simmons, Rudy Taylor

The Gap Band singles chronology
"Outstanding" (1982)	"Party Train" (1983)	"Jam the Motha'" (1983)

Alternative cover
- Party Train (The Special Dance Mix)

"Party Train" is a 1983 song by The Gap Band, released on their seventh album, Gap Band V: Jammin'. It peaked at No. 3 on the R&B charts. The original release had "I'm Ready (If You're Ready)" on the A-side and "Party Train" on the B-side. Later, "Party Train was placed on the A-side, and a special dance mix was placed on the B-side.

== Music video ==
The song's music video starts with the three Wilson brothers driving onto a crowded boardwalk, climbing out of the car and dancing in the street. It then cuts to dancers competing in a boxing ring. During this segment, it periodically cuts back to other people on the boardwalk and beach dancing, including Charlie posing with a group of body builders and wading in the ocean water in a speedo. The video ends with an unidentified person filling in a giant yellow ballot (which says "fill in the gap" at the bottom) and selecting "Gap Party" over "Democratic Party" and "Republican Party". Charlie is then tackled and falls into the water. It was directed by Don Letts.

== Chart positions ==
Chart (1983)	Peak position
US Billboard Hot Black Singles	3
