= Gap Band VII =

Studio album by The Gap Band
- Released: December 9, 1985
- Genre: R&B, funk
- Length: 42:07
- Label: Total Experience (original release); Big Break Records (expanded CD reissue)

The Gap Band chronology
Gap Band VI (1984)	Gap Band VII (1985)	Gap Band 8 (1986)

Professional ratings
Review scores
Source	Rating
AllMusic	3/5 stars

Gap Band VII is the ninth album by the Gap Band, released in 1985 on Total Experience Records. The album includes the single from original Jerry Peters's song "Going in Circles". As AllMusic's Amy Hanson said in her review of the album, "The band was quickly back to business across the eminently catchy tunes "Automatic Brain" and "Ooh, What a Feeling," leaving both "L'il Red Funkin' Hood" and "Bumpin' Gum People," which features funkier vocals than listeners had heard from the band in quite some time, to round out the set with some good-old Gap Band sonics. Elsewhere, the band pulled a quiet storm trick out of their bag on 'I Know We'll Make It'."

An expanded and remastered version of the album was released on April 29, 2013, by Big Break Records with six additional tracks.

== Track listing ==
#	Title	Writer(s)	Length
1.	Desire	Jonah Ellis	5:35
2.	Going in Circles	Jerry Peters	4:30
3.	Automatic Brain	Anthony Walker, Charlie Wilson, Billy Young	5:01
4.	L'il Red Funkin' Hood	Anthony Walker, Charlie Wilson, Billy Young	5:26
5.	Ooh, What a Feeling	Jonah Ellis	4:17
6.	I Want a Real Love	Jonah Ellis	3:57
7.	Bumpin' Gum People	Charlie Wilson, Robert Lynn Wilson, Ronnie Wilson	4:35
8.	I Know We'll Make It	Raymond Calhoun	4:54
9.	I Need Your Love	Oliver Scott	3:42
10.*	Desire (12" Special Remix)	Jonah Ellis, Lamont Johnson, Lonnie Simmons	6:26
11.*	Going in Circles (12" Long Version Remix)	Jerry Peters	5:33
12.*	Automatic Brain (12" Club Mix)	Anthony Walker, Charlie Wilson, Billy Young	7:41
13.*	Desire (12" Dub Mix)	Jonah Ellis, Lamont Johnson, Lonnie Simmons	6:28
14.*	Going in Circles (12" Instrumental with Harmonica)	Jerry Peters	5:14
15.*	Automatic Brain (12" Rap Version)	Anthony Walker, Charlie Wilson, Billy Young	5:52

(*) Bonus tracks on the remastered version

== Charts ==
=== Weekly charts ===
Chart (1985–1986)	Peak position
US Billboard 200	159
US Top R&B/Hip-Hop Albums (Billboard)	6

=== Year-end charts ===
Chart (1986)	Position
US Top R&B/Hip-Hop Albums (Billboard)	31
