= Ain't Nothin' But a Party =

1995 studio album by the Gap Band

Studio album by the Gap Band
- Released: May 5, 1995
- Length: 46:52
- Label: Raging Bull Records

The Gap Band chronology
Testimony (1994)	Ain't Nothin' But a Party (1995)	Y2K:Funkin' Till 2000 Comz (1999)

Professional ratings
Review scores
Source	Rating
AllMusic	link

Ain't Nothin But a Party is the 13th album by the Gap Band, released in 1995 on Raging Bull Records. AllMusic dismissed the album as technically proficient but weak on grooves and hooks, "one of the least funky records the Gap Band ever released."

== Track listing ==
#	Title	Writer(s)	Length
1.	"Where's My Glasses?"	Cam Wilson	0:09
2.	"First Lover"	Amanda Rushing, Cam Wilson	4:47
3.	"Closin' the G.A.P."	D-Low, Paris Turner	5:26
4.	"Got It Goin' On"	Cam Wilson, Raymond Calhoun, Val Young	6:17
5.	"You Dropped a Bomb on Me" [The Remix]	Charlie Wilson, Lonnie Simmons, Rudy Taylor	3:57
6.	"Love at Your Fingertips"	Deyon Dobson, Lance Whitfield, Theoplas Florsett	4:50
7.	"Shake Dat Booty"	Charlie Wilson, Sue Ann Carwell, Deyon Dobson, Lance "Jabaddi" Whitfield	4:23
8.	"Here We Go"	Cam Wilson, Ronnie Wilson	0:32
9.	"Over the Funkin'" Hill (Featuring George Clinton)	Cam Wilson, Ronnie Wilson	4:22
10.	" Closin' the G.A.P." [Edit][Extended Club Edit]	D-Low, Paris Turner	6:39
11.	"Why You Wanna Funk Around"	Paris Turner, Mobb, D-Low, William H. Harris Jr., Fade, Charlie Wilson, Soulful Loco	4:40
12.	"Got It Goin' On, Pt. II"	Raymond Calhoun, Ronnie Wilson	0:51
