= Humpin' =

Single by The Gap Band

from the album The Gap Band III
- A-side: "Burn Rubber on Me (Why You Wanna Hurt Me)"
- B-side: "No Hiding Place"
- Released: 1981
- Recorded: 1980
- Genre: Funk, P-Funk
- Length: 5:16
- Label: Mercury
- Songwriter(s): Charlie Wilson, Lonnie Simmons, Rudy Taylor

The Gap Band singles chronology
"Burn Rubber on Me (Why You Wanna Hurt Me)" (1980)	"Humpin'" (1981)	"Yearning for Your Love" (1981)

"Humpin'" is a 1980 song by The Gap Band, from their fifth album The Gap Band III released as a single in 1981. The original B-side, "No Hiding Place", was originally released on The Gap Band II. The song had mixed chart success, only peaking at No. 60 R&B, but busting into the top-20 on the dance charts. "Humpin'" is a fan-favorite, featured on almost all of the band's compilation albums Like their previous release, "Burn Rubber on Me", "Humpin'" was later packaged and placed as part of a single with "Yearning for Your Love" as the A-side.

== Sampling ==
To date, the song has been sampled four times:

- "Humpin'" by the College Boyz from their 1992 album Radio Fusion Radio.
- "Bumpin'" by Paperboy from his 1992 album The Nine Yards.
- "You Got Me Humpin'" by Adina Howard from her 1995 album Do You Wanna Ride?
- "Doggfather" from Snoop Doggy Dogg's 1996 album Tha Doggfather. This song featured the Gap Band's lead singer, Charlie Wilson, who worked extensively with Snoop on the whole Tha Doggfather album.
