= Outstanding =

1982 single by the Gap Band

Single by the Gap Band

from the album Gap Band IV
- B-side: "The Boys Are Back in Town"
- Released: November 1982
- Genre: R&B, Funk
- Length: 3:19 (album version); 6:13 (extended version)
- Label: Total Experience
- Songwriter: Raymond Calhoun

The Gap Band singles chronology
"You Dropped a Bomb on Me" (1982)	"Outstanding" (1982)	"Party Train" (1983)

"Outstanding" is a song originally performed by American R&B and funk band the Gap Band, written by member Raymond Calhoun. The song originally appeared on the group's 1982 album Gap Band IV. It is one of their signature songs and biggest hits, reaching the number-one spot on the US Billboard Hot Black Singles chart in February 1983. "Outstanding" also peaked at number 51 on the Billboard Hot 100.

== Charts ==
Chart (1982)	Peak position
UK Singles (OCC)	68
US Billboard Hot 100	51
US Hot Black Singles (Billboard)	1

== Kenny Thomas version ==
"Outstanding"

Single by Kenny Thomas

from the album Voices
- Released: 1990
- Length: 3:49
- Label: Cooltempo
- Songwriter: Raymond Calhoun
- Producers: Glen Gunner; Richie Fermie

Kenny Thomas singles chronology
"I Wanna Make Love to You Baby" (1988)	"Outstanding" (1990)	"Thinking About Your Love" (1991)

"Outstanding" was covered by British singer Kenny Thomas in 1990 and released as a single from his debut album, Voices (1990). It reached number nine in Luxembourg, number 12 on the UK Singles Chart, and number seven in New Zealand.

=== Charts ===
==== Weekly charts ====
Chart (1990)	Peak position
UK Singles (OCC)	79

Chart (1991)	Peak position
Israel (Israeli Singles Chart)	16
Luxembourg (Radio Luxembourg)	9
New Zealand (Recorded Music NZ)	7
UK Singles (OCC)	12
UK Airplay (Music Week)	2
UK Dance (Music Week)	1

==== Year-end charts ====
Chart (1990)	Position
UK Club Chart (Record Mirror)	92

Chart (1991)	Position
UK Singles (OCC)	93
UK Club Chart (Record Mirror)	18

== Andy Cole version ==
In 1999, footballer Andy Cole signed to WEA/Warner Music and released his version of "Outstanding" with added rap verses. Cole's version reached number 68 on the UK Singles Chart.

== In popular culture ==
In late 2024, a highlight reel of Kevin Garnett playing for the Brooklyn Nets during the 2013–14 NBA season set to this song surfaced online. The combination of Garnett's highlights and this song has been used on social media to describe anything or anyone (particularly basketball athletes) that is past their prime. As a result, this song is often colloquially referred to as "the washed anthem."

Charlie Wilson's 2023 live performance of Outstanding from NPR's Tiny Desk Concerts series has also been used as the basis of a viral AI meme trend.
