= Early in the Morning (Gap Band song) =

Single by The Gap Band

from the album Gap Band IV
- B-side: "I'm in Love"
- Released: April 1982
- Recorded: 1981–1982
- Genre: Synth-funk
- Length: 3:57 (single version); 6:30 (album version)
- Label: Total Experience
- Songwriters: Charlie Wilson; Lonnie Simmons; Rudy Taylor
- Producers: Lonnie Simmons; Rudy Taylor

The Gap Band singles chronology
"Yearning for Your Love" (1981)	"Early in the Morning" (1982)	"You Dropped a Bomb on Me" (1982)

"Early in the Morning" is a song originally performed by American band the Gap Band, and written by member Charlie Wilson and producers Lonnie Simmons and Rudy Taylor.

== Chart performance ==
It was released as a single in 1982 and went on to become their biggest hit on the US Billboard Hot 100, peaking at number 24. It also topped the Billboard R&B chart for three weeks and reached number 13 on the dance chart.

== Chart positions ==
Chart (1982)	Peak position
US Billboard Dance Club Songs	13
US Billboard Hot 100	24
US Billboard Hot Black Singles	1
UK Singles Chart	55

== Cover versions ==
The song was a hit again when British singer Robert Palmer covered it in 1988. This version peaked at number 19 on the Billboard Hot 100 and is to date the highest charting version of the song on that chart. Cash Box said that Palmer "creates a Volga River Boatman-like chorus that clearly illustrates his image of early morning loneliness."

== In popular culture ==
- The song was used as the music for a film-making montage in Michel Gondry's 2008 film, Be Kind Rewind.
- Nirvana drummer Dave Grohl credits the song "Early in the Morning" for inspiring the drum intro on their hit "Smells Like Teen Spirit".
