= Lonnie Simmons =

American record producer (1944–2019)

- Born: December 12, 1944
- Origin: Los Angeles, California
- Died: February 6, 2019 (aged 74)
- Genres: R&B, funk
- Occupations: Record producer, composer

Lonnie Simmons (December 12, 1944 – February 6, 2019) was an American record producer from Los Angeles, California. He was founder and president of the now defunct Total Experience Records. As a composer, he co-wrote several #1 R&B songs for his label's major acts, The Gap Band and Yarbrough and Peoples.

== Career ==
Lonnie Simmons operated an LA nightclub in the mid-1970s called The Total Experience. (The club made several appearances in movies like Dolemite and Black Fist.) Simmons' nightclub booked R&B-oriented musical acts, and Simmons' interest in music led him to buy a recording studio. In 1978, he signed a little-known R&B act, the Greenwood, Archer and Pine Street Band, (shortened in 1973 by a typo to the Gap Band) to his production company, and secured a record deal with Mercury Records. The band, consisting of twelve members, was reduced officially to the three Wilson brothers. Their first Total Experience-produced single, 1979's "Shake", went to #4 on the R&B charts.

Simmons' skills as a composer, however, would take the Gap Band to the next level. When they released The Gap Band II late in 1979, a song Simmons co-wrote with the Wilson brothers, "Oops Up Side Your Head", not only matched the success of "Shake" on the R&B charts, reaching #4 also, but exceeded it by propelling the album to over half-a-million in sales. Simmons had co-written only one song on The Gap Band but co-wrote six of The Gap Band II's seven tracks.

In 1980, Charlie Wilson went on a trip to Dallas and returned with two new friends: Cavin Yarbrough and Alisa Peoples. After a brief audition, Simmons exchanged contact information with them. When they showed up in LA, he suggested they record a demo with the label's other producer, who also served as their songwriter. They recorded the demo, and when he heard it, Simmons had yet another act in his ranks: Yarbrough and Peoples. That year, Simmons co-wrote two songs which peaked on the R&B charts at #1 back-to-back: "Burn Rubber on Me (Why You Wanna Hurt Me)", which was released on The Gap Band III, and "Don't Stop the Music", which was released on Yarbrough & Peoples' debut album, The Two of Us. The latter album went gold, while the former went platinum, selling over a million copies.

Simmon's winning streak continued in 1981, when he formed Total Experience Records and convinced Mercury's parent company PolyGram to distribute the label's recordings. He then transferred the Gap Band and Yarbrough & Peoples (who were already signed to his production company) to the Total Experience label. Gap Band IV was released in early 1982 and spawned three singles, which all peaked in the top-40 on the dance charts and top-2 on the R&B songs: #1 "Early in the Morning", #2 "You Dropped a Bomb on Me" (both of which Simmons helped write), and #1 "Outstanding", the first two of which Simmons wrote. The album went platinum within a year. Later in 1982, he signed Robert "Goodie" Whitfield to the label. His debut album, Call Me Goodie, peaked at #31 R&B.

The Gap Band's 1983 release, Gap Band V: Jammin' (#2 R&B, #28 Billboard 200), saw Simmons take a reduced writing/producing role; he co-wrote only one song. The album went gold, headlined by the only Simmons co-penned single, "Party Train", which went to #3 on the R&B charts. Yarbrough and Peoples released Heartbeats that year, and it peaked at #25 R&B, and the title track went to #10 R&B. One of their 1984 singles, "Be a Winner", topped the R&B charts.

In 1984, Total Experience began a new distribution deal with RCA Records.

Even though his two major acts produced hits well into the mid-80s, Total Experience began to falter. During 1984 and 1985, the label expanded from three acts to fourteen, including Bernie Hamilton & the Inculcation Band and Switch. Not a single one of the newcomers released more than one album with Total Experience (two of them only produced one song) and none of them scored any hits. Meanwhile, Yarbrough and Peoples got married and moved back to Texas, and Goodie quit. This left the Gap Band as the label's sole act by 1986.

The Gap Band's subsequent releases, Gap Band VII and Gap Band 8, received chart success due to heavy radio airplay but sold few actual copies. The Gap Band's final hurrah with Total Experience, Straight from the Heart, got a top 40 song from the title track but failed to sell, causing the Gap Band to leave for Capitol Records.

With no acts remaining, Lonnie dropped out of music, and his company turned to motion picture and video production.

Simmons died on February 6, 2019.

== Legacy ==
Music written by Lonnie Simmons has been sampled heavily in contemporary R&B and hip hop music.
