= Total Experience Records =

- Parent company: Universal Music (1979–1983 catalog); BMG Rights Management (1984–1987 catalog)
- Founded: 1975; 51 years ago (as Total Experience Productions); 1981; 45 years ago (as a label)
- Founder: Lonnie Simmons
- Defunct: 1987; 39 years ago
- Status: Defunct
- Distributors: PolyGram (1981–1984); RCA (1984–1987)
- Genre: R&B; Funk
- Country of origin: United States
- Location: Beverly Hills, California

Total Experience Records was a record label founded by Lonnie Simmons. Its two major acts were The Gap Band and Yarbrough & Peoples. It originally began in 1975 as a production company with the first release being a 45 with the Semper led group New Experience on Ariola Records. By the fall of 1978, the production company signed a label deal with Mercury Records, before Simmons decided to transform the production company into a label in 1981. From its inception in 1981 to late 1983, Total Experience was a subsidiary label of Mercury's parent company, PolyGram. In 1984, the label became independent, changing its distribution from PolyGram to RCA Records.

== History ==
In the 1970s, Lonnie Simmons operated a club on Crenshaw Boulvevard in South Central Los Angeles called The Total Experience, similar to the West-Hollywood Roxy Theatre. Eventually he invested in a recording studio sourced, brokered, and designed by George Semper who was musical director at the Total Experience club and friendly with Ron Kass (the Beatles Manager). The recording studio was previously occupied by Sound Recorders Studios on the corner of Yucca St. and Argyle Ave. in Hollywood and the Beatles US based studio.

Simmons then launched his production company, named after the nightclub, with the first release being a single titled "Soul Music" by New Experience. The studio quickly became profitable, with artists such as L.T.D. and the Jacksons recording albums there. Simmons met the Gap Band in 1977 through a friend, singer D. J. Rogers. He then had the idea to reduce the official lineup of the group from twelve members to its sibling trio of Ronnie, Charlie and Robert Wilson. After signing the Gap Band to Total Experience Productions, and securing the production company a label deal with Mercury Records in late 1978, Simmons himself personally produced the Gap Band's albums during their tenure, and co-wrote their breakthrough song, "Oops Up Side Your Head".

While in Texas, Gap Band leader Charlie Wilson discovered Alisa Peoples & Calvin Yarbrough, who were performing as part of the band, Grand Theft. Charlie convinced Lonnie to give the couple a chance, which paid off in 1980, when they released the song "Don't Stop the Music", which topped the R&B charts. This was immediately following the Gap Band #1 R&B song "Burn Rubber on Me (Why You Wanna Hurt Me)". Both of those albums went gold, and two of the Gap Band's albums went platinum. The first three Simmons-produced Gap Band albums, as well as Yarbrough and Peoples debut album The Two of Us were successful enough to give Simmons credibility to establish the production company as a full label, and after negotiations with PolyGram, he officially launched Total Experience Records in 1981.

Gap Band IV, released in early 1982, was the first Total Experience album release. The success of Gap Band IV, Robert "Goodie" Whitfield's debut album Call Me Goodie (also released in 1982), 1983's Gap Band V: Jammin' and Yarbrough and Peoples' Heartbeats resulted in a lucrative distribution deal with RCA Records in early 1984. At the tail-end of 1984, A Total Experience Christmas was released, featuring songs by five of the label's acts, as well as two of the label's writers.

Even though the Gap Band and Yarbrough & Peoples still had high charting records through the mid-80s, the successes were ephemeral and they resulted in far fewer sales. Lonnie signed a plethora of new acts in 1984–85 and two established acts: Switch and Billy Paul. None of these acts managed to have any success with Total Experience. The Gap Band released 4 albums: Gap Band VI, Gap Band VII, Gap Band 8, and Straight from the Heart before moving on to Capitol Records in 1989. Yarbrough and Peoples left the label in 1986, and moved back to Texas, where they married in 1987.

In 1987 Total Experience ended its distribution deal with RCA and carried on via self distribution, faltering soon after. The label's post 1984 holdings now belong to Minder Music, while its PolyGram-distributed holdings belong to Universal Music Enterprises.

== Personnel ==
=== Acts ===
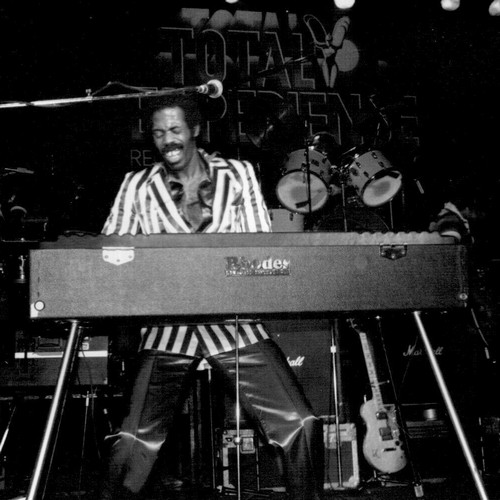
Robert "Goodie" Whitfield in 1983

- Bernie Hamilton & the Inculcation Band (1985) s
- Billy & Baby Gap (1985) s
- Billy Paul s
- Eddie "E.T." Towns (1985) s
- The Gap Band (1977–1988) m
- Robert "Goodie" Whitfield (1982–1985) m
- Pattie Howard (1985) s
- Pennye Ford (1984) s
- Prime Time (1984) m
- Prophet (1985) s
- Sparkle s
- Switch (1984) s
- Will King (1985) s
- Yarbrough and Peoples (1980–1985) m

An m indicates the group released multiple full-length albums on Total Experience.
An s indicates the performer either only released one full-length album on Total Experience, or released multiple singles and no album at all.

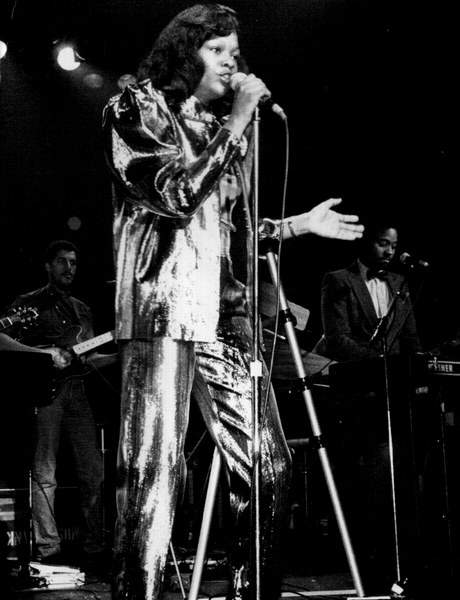
Yarbrough and Peoples in 1983

=== Key Producers ===
- Jonah Ellis p
- Lonnie Simmons
- Oliver Scott p
- Suha Gur

=== Key Writers ===
- Charlie Wilson p
- Jonah Ellis p
- Lonnie Simmons
- Malvin Vice
- Oliver Scott p
- Raymond Calhoun
- Robert Wilson p
- Ronnie Wilson p
- Rudolph Taylor
- Greg C Jackson p

A p indicates a writer/producer who also performed at least one song on the label.

== See also ==
- Charlie Wilson
- The Gap Band
- Yarbrough & Peoples
