= Burn Rubber (Why You Wanna Hurt Me) =

Single by the Gap Band

from the album The Gap Band III
- A-side: "Yearning for Your Love"
- B-side: "Nothing Comes to Sleepers"; "Baby Baba Boogie"; "Humpin'"
- Released: December 1980
- Recorded: 1980
- Genre: Funk
- Length: 3:59 (single edit); 5:30 (album version)
- Label: Mercury
- Songwriters: Charlie Wilson; Lonnie Simmons; Rudy Taylor
- Producer: Lonnie Simmons

The Gap Band singles chronology
"Party Lights" (1980)	"Burn Rubber (Why You Wanna Hurt Me)" (1980)	"Humpin'" (1981)

Music video
- "Burn Rubber (Why You Wanna Hurt Me)" (TopPop, 1981) on YouTube

"Burn Rubber (Why You Wanna Hurt Me)" is an American funk song originally performed by the Gap Band in 1980 and written by member Charlie Wilson, Rudy Taylor, and producer Lonnie Simmons.

== Background ==
According to engineer Jack Rouben, the foundation of the song started with its bassline: "[The track] was a musical idea that Charlie came up with on the Minimoog that turned into a groove, then a completed arrangement, and then they put the lyrics at the very end...This song was built upon that one repeating bass track, and that was the jam that blossomed into a whole complete song." Rouben also remarked how the title for this song, along with many other hits by the band, was a phrase coined by co-writer Rudy Taylor.

== Chart performance ==
In 1981, it peaked at number 84 on the Billboard Hot 100, number 90 on Cash Box and number 1 on the R&B charts. Billboard magazine ranked it as the 12th biggest R&B single of 1981. A later single released, featuring "Humpin'" on the B-side, scored a number 19 appearance on the dance charts.

== Inspiration ==
On June 30, 2021, Foo Fighters lead guitarist and vocalist and former Nirvana drummer Dave Grohl said that the drumming on "Smells Like Teen Spirit" was heavily inspired by the drum intro of "Burn Rubber on Me".
