= The Gap Band =

American R&B and funk band (1967–2010)

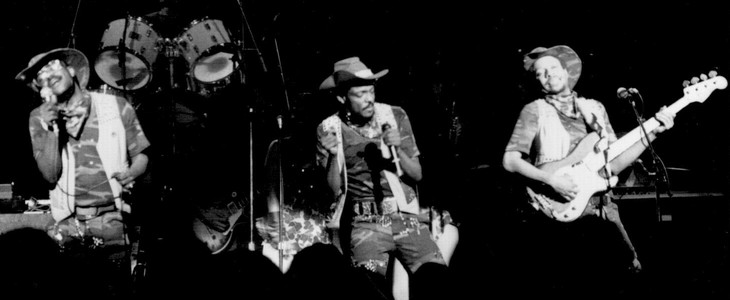
- The Gap Band in 1983

Background information
- Origin: Tulsa, Oklahoma, U.S.
- Genres: Funk, Disco, Boogie, R&B, Soul
- Years active: 1967–2010
- Labels: Shelter, Tattoo/RCA, Mercury, Total Experience, Capitol
- Past members: Charlie Wilson; Ronnie Wilson; Robert Wilson
- Website: www.gapband.com

The Gap Band was an American R&B and funk band that rose to fame during the 1970s and 1980s. The band consisted of three brothers: Charlie, Ronnie, and Robert Wilson, along with other members. The band was originally named The Greenwood, Archer, and Pine Band after streets (Greenwood, Archer, and Pine) in the historic Greenwood neighborhood in the brothers' hometown of Tulsa, Oklahoma.

== History ==
=== 1967–1978: Early years ===
The band formed in Tulsa in 1967, based around the three Wilson brothers, but often included other musicians as well. The name "Greenwood, Archer, and Pine Band" originally started as a joke, reflecting the band's origins, and was shortened to GAP Band later. The band received its first big break by being the back up band for fellow Oklahoman Leon Russell's Stop All That Jazz album released in 1974.

Early on, the group took on a funk sound typical of the early 1970s. This style failed to catch on, and their first two LP's, 1974's Magicians Holiday which was recorded at Leon Russell's historic The Church Studio and 1977's The Gap Band (not to be confused with their 1979 album), failed to chart or produce any charting singles. Afterwards, they were introduced to Los Angeles producer Lonnie Simmons, who signed them to his production company, Total Experience Productions (named after his successful Crenshaw Boulevard nightclub), and managed to secure a record deal with Mercury Records.

=== 1979–1985: Success ===
On their first album with Simmons, The Gap Band, they found chart success with songs such as "I'm in Love" and "Shake"; the latter became a Top 10 R&B hit in 1979.

Later that year, the group released "I Don't Believe You Want to Get Up and Dance (Oops!)" on their album The Gap Band II. Although it did not hit the Billboard Hot 100, it soared to number 4 in the US Billboard R&B chart, and the album went gold. The song, and the band's musical output as a whole, became more P-Funk-esque, with expanded use of the synthesizers and spoken monologues within songs (see audio sample). The song "Steppin' (Out)" also reached the top 10 R&B.

"I Don't Believe You Want to Get Up and Dance (Oops)" (1979)
The Gap Band's breakthrough single, "I Don't Believe You Want to Get Up and Dance (Oops!)" exemplifies the sound that made them famous.

Charlie Wilson provided background vocals on Stevie Wonder's 1980 hit "I Ain't Gonna Stand for It" from Wonder's album Hotter Than July (1980).

The band reached a whole new level of fame in 1980 with the release of the number 1 R&B and number 16 Billboard 200 hit, The Gap Band III. That album had soul ballads such as the number 5 R&B song "Yearning for Your Love", and funk songs such as the R&B chart-topper "Burn Rubber (Why You Wanna Hurt Me)" and "Humpin'". They repeated this formula on the number 1 R&B album Gap Band IV in 1982 (the first album released on Simmons' newly launched Total Experience Records), which resulted in three hit singles: "Early in the Morning" (number 1 R&B, number 13 Dance, number 24 Hot 100), "You Dropped a Bomb on Me" (number 2 R&B, number 31 Hot 100, number 39 Dance), and "Outstanding" (number 1 R&B, number 24 Dance). It was during this time that former Brides of Funkenstein singer Dawn Silva joined them on tour.

Their 1983 album, Gap Band V: Jammin', went gold, but was not quite as successful as the previous works, peaking at number 2 R&B and number 28 on the Billboard 200. The single "Party Train" peaked at number 3 R&B, and the song "Jam the Motha'" peaked at number 16 R&B, but neither made it onto the Hot 100. The album's closer "Someday" (a loose cover of Donny Hathaway's "Someday We'll All Be Free") featured Stevie Wonder as a guest vocalist.

Their next work, Gap Band VI brought them back to number 1 R&B in 1985, but the album sold fewer copies and did not go gold. "Beep a Freak" hit number 2 R&B, "I Found My Baby" peaked at number 8 on the R&B charts, and "Disrespect" peaked at number 18. That year, lead singer Charlie Wilson and singer Shirley Murdock provided backing vocals on Zapp & Roger's number 8 R&B "Computer Love".

=== 1986–2010: Later years ===
While their 1986 cover of "Going in Circles" went to number 2 on the R&B charts, and the album it was released on, Gap Band VII, hit number 6 R&B, the album almost became their first in years to miss the Billboard 200, peaking at number 159.

While they were beginning to struggle stateside, the group found their greatest success in the UK when their 1986 single "Big Fun" from Gap Band 8 reached number 4 in the UK Singles Chart. 1988's Straight from the Heart was their last studio album with Total Experience.

The Gap Band caught a small break in 1988 with the Keenen Ivory Wayans film, I'm Gonna Git You Sucka. They contributed the non-charting "You're So Cute" and the number 14 R&B title track to the film (The first was not on the soundtrack, but was used in the film). Their first song on their new label, Capitol Records, 1989's "All of My Love" (from their album Round Trip), is, to date, their last number 1 R&B hit. The album also produced the number 8 R&B "Addicted to Your Love" and the number 18 R&B ""We Can Make it Alright." They left Capitol Records the next year and went on a five-year hiatus from producing new material.

During the 1990s, the band released two non-charting studio albums and two live albums, with the band remaining active until 2010.

== Legacy ==
In 1992, Charlie ventured into a solo career and has since had several moderate R&B hits on his own. Wilson's vocals were credited in part for inspiring the vocal style of new jack swing artists Guy, Aaron Hall, Jodeci, Keith Sweat, and R. Kelly. The band reunited in 1996, and issued The Gap Band: Live and Well, a live greatest hits album.

On August 26, 2005, The Gap Band was honored as a BMI Icon at the 57th annual BMI Urban Awards. The honor is given to a creator who has been "a unique and indelible influence on generations of music makers". "Outstanding" alone remains one of the most sampled songs in history and has, astonishingly, been used by over 150 artists.

Nirvana drummer Dave Grohl credits The Gap Band for inspiring the drum intro on their hit "Smells Like Teen Spirit."

Robert Wilson died of a heart attack at his home in Palmdale, California on August 15, 2010, at the age of 53.

Ronnie Wilson died following a stroke on November 2, 2021, at the age of 73.

=== Sampling ===
==== Music ====
Since the 1990s, many of The Gap Band's hits have been sampled and/or covered by R&B and hip hop artists such as II D Extreme, Brand Nubian, Tyler, the Creator, 69 Boyz, Ashanti, Big Mello, Blackstreet, Mary J. Blige, Da Brat, Ice Cube, Jermaine Dupri, Mia X, Nas, Rob Base, Shaquille O'Neal, Snoop Dogg, Soul For Real, Tina Turner, Love Tractor and Vesta. Other musicians inspired by The Gap Band, or who sampled them, include Guy, Aaron Hall, Jagged Edge, Bill Heausler, Mint Condition, Madonna, R. Kelly, Ruff Endz, Keith Sweat, Joe Miller, GRiTT, The Delta Troubadours, and D'Extra Wiley.

Producer Heavy D sampled "Outstanding" for "Every Little Thing", a 1995 hit single by his boy band prodigies Soul for Real, which reached number 17 on the Billboard Hot 100. Ten years later, Polish rappers Red and Spinache sampled "Outstanding" for "Wczoraj", from their album 7 Rano.

British singer George Michael incorporated parts of "Burn Rubber on Me" in his 1997 single "Star People".

== Members ==
=== Main lineup ===
- Charlie Wilson (born 1953) – lead vocals, piano, synthesizer, clavinet, organ, drums
- Ronnie Wilson (1948–2021) – vocals, trumpet, flugelhorn, piano, synthesizer, percussion, songwriter
- Robert Wilson (1956–2010) – bass, guitar, percussion, vocals

=== Supporting musicians ===
- Lonnie Simmons – Guitar, percussion
- Rudy Taylor – Keyboard, programming, back vocal
- Raymond Calhoun – Percussion, drums, vocals
- Ronnie Kaufman – Drums
- Rastine Calhoun – Saxes
- Val Young – Vocals
- Penny Ford – Vocals
- Billy Young – Keyboard
- Cavin Yarbrough – Keyboard
- Robert "Goodie" Whitfield – Piano, synthesizer, saxophone
- James Gadson – Drums
- James "Jimi" Macon – Guitar (1977–1986)
- Chris Clayton – Saxophone, vocals (1974–1983)
- Alvin Jones – Trombone (1974)
- Tommy Lokey – Trumpet (1974–1983)
- Carl Scoggins – Congas, percussion (1974)
- Roscoe Smith – Drums (1974)
- Arthur "Don" Lee Green Jr. – Drums
- Michael Whitney - Guitar
- O'Dell Stokes – Guitar (1974)
- Lawrence "Lukii" Scott – Guitar (1974)
- Tim Fenderson (Rabbit) – Bass
- LaSalle Gabriel – Guitar (1994–1997)
- Malvin "Dino" Vice – Trumpet, vocals, horn and string arrangements
- Oliver Scott – Piano, synthesizer, trombone, vocals
- Ray Hayes – Drums
- Ronnie Smith- Drums
- Fred "Locksmith" Jenkins – Guitar (-2025)
- Glenn Nightingale – Guitar
- Earl Roberson – Horns, saxophone
- Jimmy Hamilton – Piano, synthesizer
- Maurice Hayes – Guitar
- Ira Ward – Drums, Bass, guitar, piano
- Greg C Jackson “G Jack” – Piano, synthesizer, vocal arranger, producer, programming and sequencing.
- Victor Orlando – Percussions (1986)
- Jimmy Corona – Guitar (1983)
- Barry Chenault - Drums

== Composers ==
- Charlie Wilson
- Ronnie Wilson
- Robert Wilson
- Lonnie Simmons
- Oliver Scott
- Jonah Ellis
- Malvin "Dino" Vice
- Raymond Calhoun
- Rudy Taylor
- Greg C Jackson
- Buddy Jones

== Discography ==
- Magicians Holiday (1974)
- The Gap Band (1977)
- The Gap Band (1979)
- The Gap Band II (1979)
- The Gap Band III (1980)
- Gap Band IV (1982)
- Gap Band V: Jammin' (1983)
- Gap Band VI (1984)
- Gap Band VII (1985)
- Gap Band 8 (1986)
- Straight from the Heart (1988)
- Round Trip (1989)
- Testimony (1994)
- Ain't Nothin' But a Party (1995)
- Y2K: Funkin' Till 2000 Comz (1999)
