= Billboard Year-End Hot Soul Singles of 1981 =

American music chart

This is a list of Billboard magazine's Top Hot Soul Singles of 1981.

No.	Title	Artist(s)
1	"Endless Love"	Diana Ross and Lionel Richie
2	"Master Blaster (Jammin')"	Stevie Wonder
3	"Give It to Me Baby"	Rick James
4	"Don't Stop the Music"	Yarbrough and Peoples
5	"Being with You"	Smokey Robinson
6	"Double Dutch Bus"	Frankie Smith
7	"Celebration"	Kool & the Gang
8	"Sukiyaki"	A Taste of Honey
9	"What Cha' Gonna Do for Me"	Chaka Khan
10	"Fantastic Voyage"	Lakeside
11	"A Woman Needs Love (Just Like You Do)"	Ray Parker Jr. and Raydio
12	"Burn Rubber (Why You Wanna Hurt Me)"	The Gap Band
13	"How 'Bout Us"	Champaign
14	"It's a Love Thing"	The Whispers
15	"Watching You"	Slave
16	"Just the Two of Us"	Grover Washington Jr.
17	"Two Hearts"	Stephanie Mills and Teddy Pendergrass
18	"Freaky Dancin'"	Cameo
19	"She's a Bad Mama Jama (She's Built, She's Stacked)"	Carl Carlton
20	"Magic Man"	Robert Winters and Fall
21	"Just Be My Lady"	Larry Graham
22	"I'm in Love"	Evelyn King
23	"Together"	Tierra
24	"Thighs High (Grip Your Hips and Move)"	Tom Browne
25	"Make That Move"	Shalamar
26	"Shake It Up Tonight"	Cheryl Lynn
27	"Love on a Two-Way Street"	Stacy Lattisaw
28	"Sweet Baby"	Stanley Clarke and George Duke
29	"Square Biz"	Teena Marie
30	"Lady (You Bring Me Up)"	Commodores
31	"Stay the Night"	Billy Ocean
32	"Yearning for Your Love"	The Gap Band
33	"Bon Bon Vie (Gimme the Good Life)"	T. S. Monk
34	"When Love Calls"	Atlantic Starr
35	"Slow Hand"	The Pointer Sisters
36	"Love Over and Over Again"	Switch
37	"All American Girls"	Sister Sledge
38	"Pull Up to the Bumper"	Grace Jones
39	"I Just Love the Man"	The Jones Girls
40	"Paradise"	Change
41	"Keep It Hot"	Cameo
42	"Ai No Corrida"	Quincy Jones
43	"Too Tight"	Con Funk Shun
44	"Are You Single"	Aurra
45	"Very Special"	Debra Laws
46	"Heartbeat"	Taana Gardner
47	"Running Away"	Maze
48	"When She Was My Girl"	Four Tops
49	"Heartbreak Hotel"	The Jacksons
50	"I Ain't Gonna Stand for It"	Stevie Wonder

== See also ==
- 1981 in music
- Billboard Year-End Hot 100 singles of 1981
- List of Hot Soul Singles number ones of 1981
