= List of Hot Soul Singles number ones of 1981 =

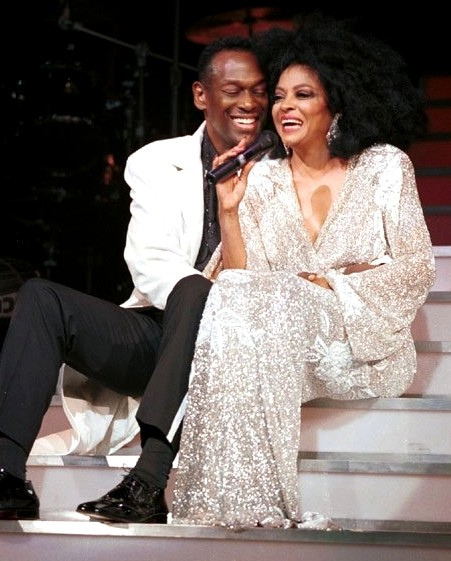
Luther Vandross (left) gained his first number one with "Never Too Much". Diana Ross (right) collaborated with Lionel Richie on "Endless Love", the year's longest-running number one.

Billboard published a weekly chart in 1981 ranking the top-performing singles in the United States in soul music and related African American-oriented genres; the chart has undergone various name changes over the decades to reflect the evolution of black music and has been published as Hot R&B/Hip-Hop Songs since 2005. In 1981, it was published under the title Hot Soul Singles, and 17 different singles reached number one.

In the issue of Billboard dated January 3, "Celebration" by Kool & the Gang spent its third week in the top spot. The song's run at number one extended to six weeks before it was displaced by "Fantastic Voyage" by Lakeside, the first chart-topper for the group. It was the first of three consecutive debut number ones, as it was followed into the top spot by "Burn Rubber on Me (Why You Wanna Hurt Me)" by the Gap Band and "Don't Stop the Music" by Yarbrough and Peoples, each act's first single to reach the peak position. A number of other artists also reached number one for the first time later in the year. In May, Ray Parker Jr. & Raydio topped the chart for the first time with "A Woman Needs Love (Just Like You Do)", and Frankie Smith reached number one two months later with "Double Dutch Bus", the only charting single of his career. Smith's single was followed into the top spot by "I'm in Love", the first number one for Evelyn King, who for that single was not credited with her usual nickname of "Champagne". In October, "Never Too Much" was the debut number one for Luther Vandross, who would go on to become one of the most successful black artists of the 1980s. Finally, Roger, front man of the band Zapp, reached number one with his first solo chart entry, "I Heard It Through the Grapevine (Part 1)".

The longest-running number one of 1981 was "Endless Love" by Diana Ross and Lionel Richie, which spent seven consecutive weeks in the top spot beginning in August. It was the second of the year's soul number ones to also top Billboard's pop singles chart, the Hot 100, following "Celebration" earlier in the year. Ross and Richie also had the highest total number of weeks at number one during 1981, ahead of five acts who each spent five weeks in the top spot. "Endless Love" was displaced from the top spot by "When She Was My Girl" by the Four Tops, former labelmates of Ross with the Motown label. It was the first number one since 1966 for the Tops, whose chart placings had declined after they left Motown in the early 1970s, with only one of their singles having made the top ten in the preceding seven years. Kool & the Gang were the only act with multiple soul number ones in 1981, spending a single week atop the chart with "Take My Heart (You Can Have It If You Want It)" in November to add to the four weeks spent at number one in January by "Celebration". The year's final number one was "Let's Groove" by Earth, Wind & Fire.

== Chart history ==
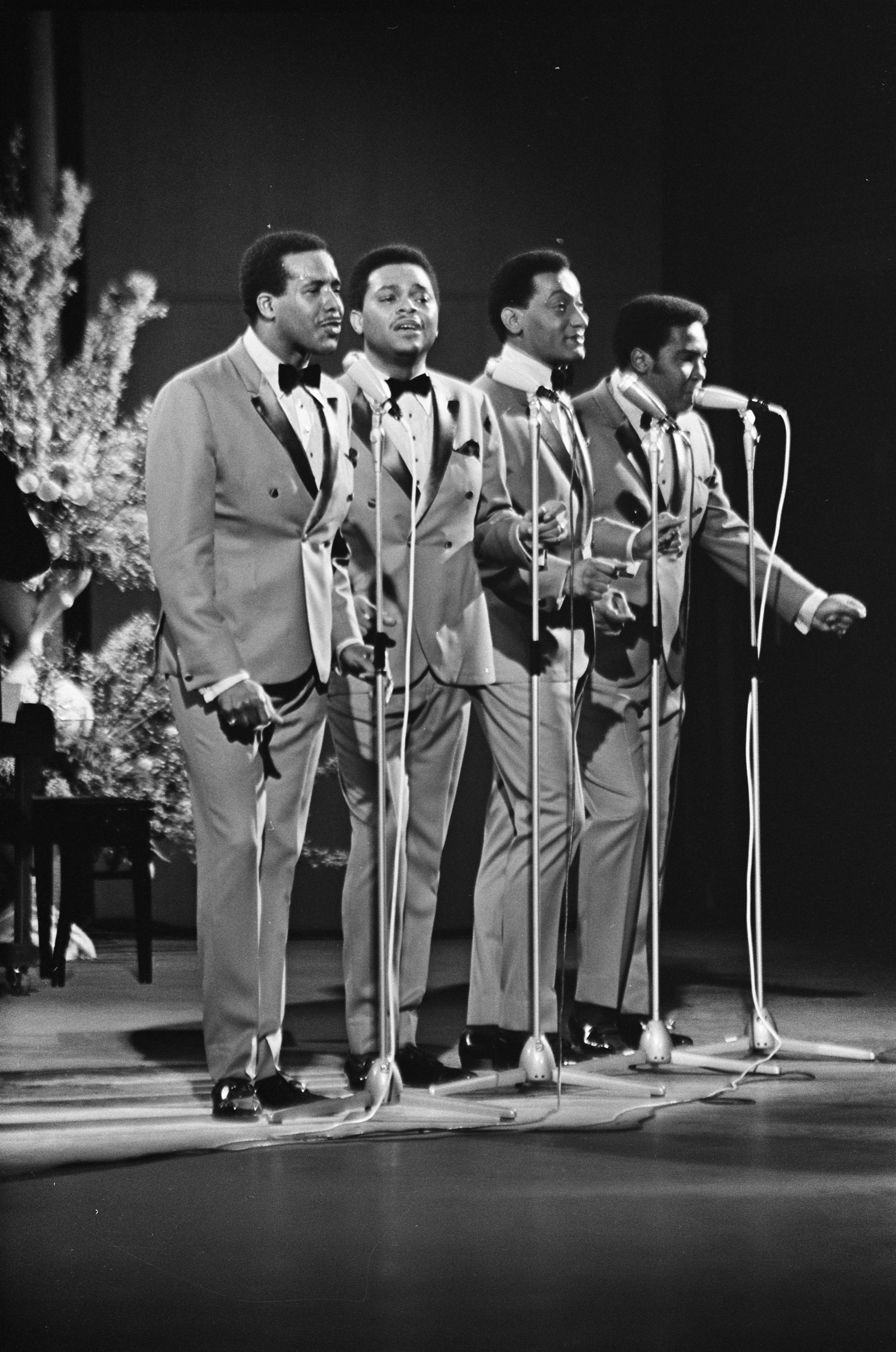
The Four Tops achieved their first chart-topper since 1966 with "When She Was My Girl".

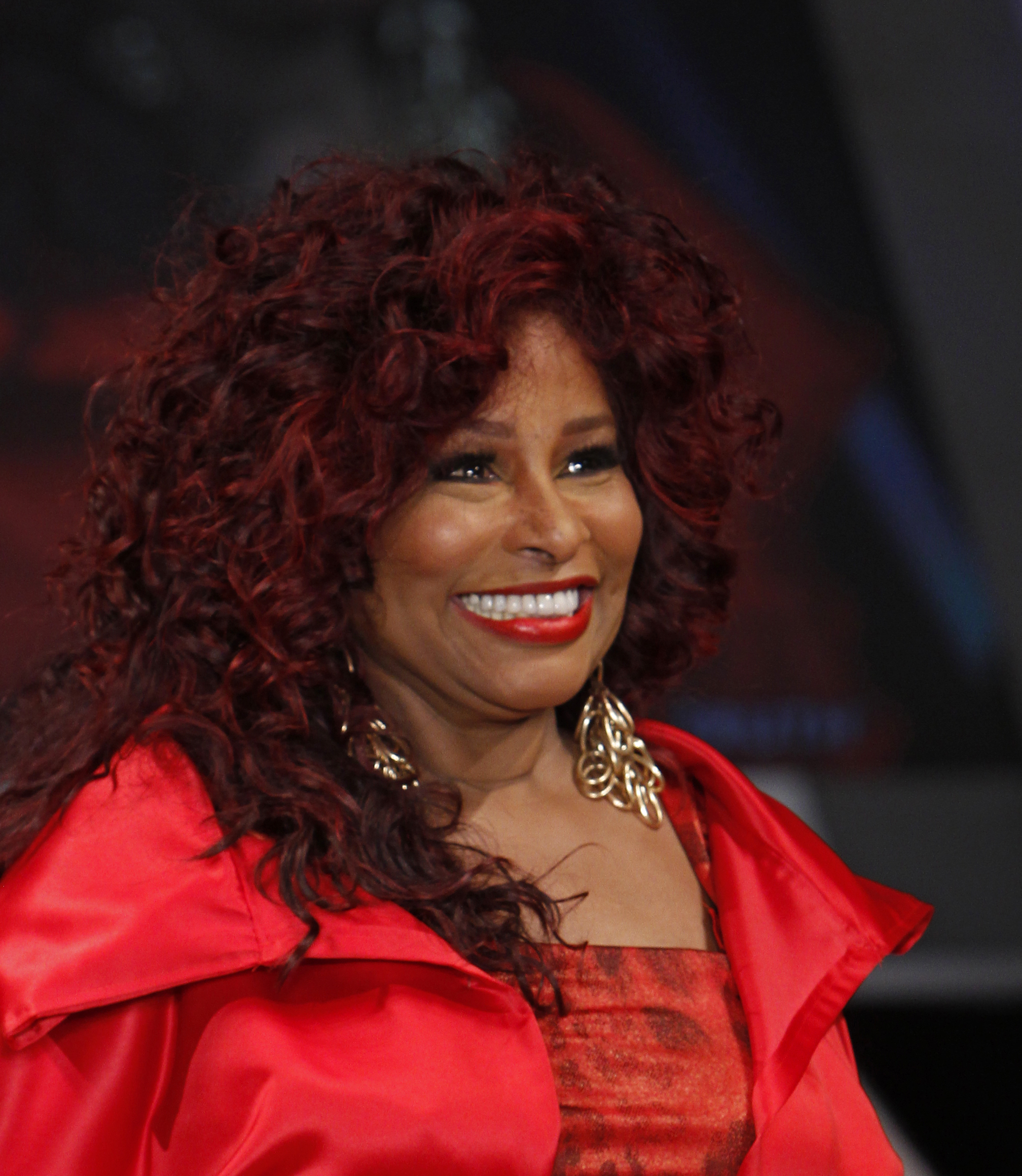
Chaka Khan spent two weeks at number one with "What Cha' Gonna Do for Me".

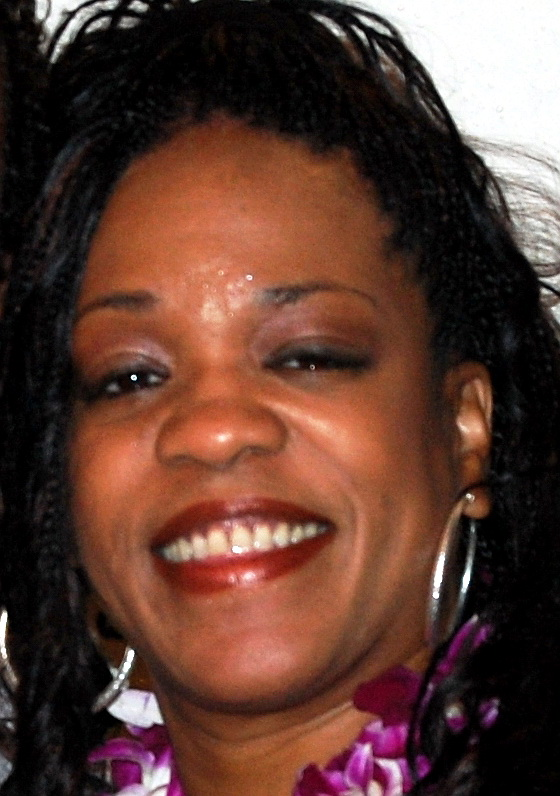
Evelyn King reached number one for the first time with "I'm in Love".

Key
†	Indicates number 1 on Billboard's year-end soul chart

Chart history
Issue date	Title	Artist(s)	Ref.
January 3	"Celebration"	Kool & the Gang	
January 10	"Celebration"	Kool & the Gang	
January 17	"Celebration"	Kool & the Gang	
January 24	"Celebration"	Kool & the Gang	
January 31	"Fantastic Voyage"	Lakeside	
February 7	"Fantastic Voyage"	Lakeside	
February 14	"Burn Rubber on Me (Why You Wanna Hurt Me)"	Gap Band	
February 21	"Burn Rubber on Me (Why You Wanna Hurt Me)"	Gap Band	
February 28	"Don't Stop the Music"	Yarbrough and Peoples	
March 7	"Don't Stop the Music"	Yarbrough and Peoples	
March 14	"Don't Stop the Music"	Yarbrough and Peoples	
March 21	"Don't Stop the Music"	Yarbrough and Peoples	
March 28	"Don't Stop the Music"	Yarbrough and Peoples	
April 4	"Being with You"	Smokey Robinson	
April 11	"Being with You"	Smokey Robinson	
April 18	"Being with You"	Smokey Robinson	
April 25	"Being with You"	Smokey Robinson	
May 2	"Being with You"	Smokey Robinson	
May 9	"Sukiyaki"	A Taste of Honey	
May 16	"A Woman Needs Love (Just Like You Do)"	Ray Parker Jr. & Raydio	
May 23	"A Woman Needs Love (Just Like You Do)"	Ray Parker Jr. & Raydio	
May 30	"What Cha' Gonna Do for Me"	Chaka Khan	
June 6	"What Cha' Gonna Do for Me"	Chaka Khan	
June 13	"Give It to Me Baby"	Rick James	
June 20	"Give It to Me Baby"	Rick James	
June 27	"Give It to Me Baby"	Rick James	
July 4	"Give It to Me Baby"	Rick James	
July 11	"Give It to Me Baby"	Rick James	
July 18	"Double Dutch Bus"	Frankie Smith	
July 25	"Double Dutch Bus"	Frankie Smith	
August 1	"Double Dutch Bus"	Frankie Smith	
August 8	"Double Dutch Bus"	Frankie Smith	
August 15	"I'm in Love"	Evelyn King	
August 22	"Endless Love" †	Diana Ross and Lionel Richie	
August 29	"Endless Love" †	Diana Ross and Lionel Richie	
September 5	"Endless Love" †	Diana Ross and Lionel Richie	
September 12	"Endless Love" †	Diana Ross and Lionel Richie	
September 19	"Endless Love" †	Diana Ross and Lionel Richie	
September 26	"Endless Love" †	Diana Ross and Lionel Richie	
October 3	"Endless Love" †	Diana Ross and Lionel Richie	
October 10	"When She Was My Girl"	The Four Tops	
October 17	"When She Was My Girl"	The Four Tops	
October 24	"Never Too Much"	Luther Vandross	
October 31	"Never Too Much"	Luther Vandross	
November 7	"I Heard It Through the Grapevine (Part 1)"	Roger	
November 14	"I Heard It Through the Grapevine (Part 1)"	Roger	
November 21	"Take My Heart (You Can Have It If You Want It)"	Kool & the Gang	
November 28	"Let's Groove"	Earth, Wind & Fire	
December 5	"Let's Groove"	Earth, Wind & Fire	
December 12	"Let's Groove"	Earth, Wind & Fire	
December 19	"Let's Groove"	Earth, Wind & Fire	
December 26	"Let's Groove"	Earth, Wind & Fire	

== See also ==
- 1981 in music
- Billboard Year-End Hot Soul Singles of 1981
- List of Billboard Hot 100 number ones of 1981
