= List of Billboard Hot 100 top-ten singles in 1981 =

This is a list of singles that have peaked in the Top 10 of the Billboard Hot 100 during 1981.

Overall, a total of 87 songs hit the top 10, including 17 number-one songs and 10 songs that peaked at number-two.

Hall & Oates scored four top ten hits during the year with "Kiss on My List", "You Make My Dreams", "Private Eyes", and "I Can't Go for That (No Can Do)", the most among all other artists.

== Top-ten singles ==
- (#) – 1981 Year-end top 10 single position and rank

List of Billboard Hot 100 top ten singles which peaked in 1981
| Top ten entry date | Single | Artist(s) | Peak | Peak date | Weeks in top ten |
Singles from 1980
| November 29 | "Love on the Rocks" | Neil Diamond | 2 | January 10 | 10 |
| December 13 | "Guilty" | Barbra Streisand and Barry Gibb | 3 | January 10 | 7 |
| December 20 | "Every Woman in the World" | Air Supply | 5 | January 31 | 8 |
| December 27 | "The Tide Is High" | Blondie | 1 | January 31 | 10 |
| December 27 | "Tell It Like It Is" | Heart | 8 | January 10 | 4 |
Singles from 1981
| January 10 | "Passion" | Rod Stewart | 5 | February 7 | 6 |
| January 17 | "De Do Do Do, De Da Da Da" | The Police | 10 | January 17 | 2 |
| January 24 | "I Love a Rainy Night" (#8) | Eddie Rabbitt | 1 | February 28 | 9 |
| January 24 | "It's My Turn" | Diana Ross | 9 | January 24 | 3 |
| January 31 | "Celebration" (#6) | Kool & the Gang | 1 | February 7 | 7 |
| January 31 | "9 to 5" (#9) | Dolly Parton | 1 | February 21 | 9 |
| January 31 | "I Made It Through the Rain" | Barry Manilow | 10 | January 31 | 1 |
| February 7 | "Woman" | John Lennon | 2 | March 21 | 12 |
| February 7 | "Givin' It Up for Your Love" | Delbert McClinton | 8 | February 21 | 5 |
| February 14 | "Keep On Loving You" (#10) | REO Speedwagon | 1 | March 21 | 9 |
| February 14 | "Hey Nineteen" | Steely Dan | 10 | February 14 | 2 |
| February 21 | "The Best of Times" | Styx | 3 | March 21 | 10 |
| February 21 | "Same Old Lang Syne" | Dan Fogelberg | 9 | February 21 | 2 |
| February 28 | "The Winner Takes It All" | ABBA | 8 | March 14 | 4 |
| March 7 | "Crying" | Don McLean | 5 | March 21 | 6 |
| March 7 | "Hello Again" | Neil Diamond | 6 | March 28 | 5 |
| March 14 | "Rapture" | Blondie | 1 | March 28 | 8 |
| March 21 | "What Kind of Fool" | Barbra Streisand and Barry Gibb | 10 | March 21 | 3 |
| March 28 | "Kiss on My List" (#7) | Hall & Oates | 1 | April 11 | 8 |
| March 28 | "Just the Two of Us" | Grover Washington Jr. & Bill Withers | 2 | May 2 | 11 |
| April 4 | "While You See a Chance" | Steve Winwood | 7 | April 18 | 5 |
| April 11 | "Morning Train (Nine to Five)" | Sheena Easton | 1 | May 2 | 6 |
| April 11 | "Don't Stand So Close to Me" | The Police | 10 | April 11 | 3 |
| April 18 | "Being with You" | Smokey Robinson | 2 | May 23 | 10 |
| April 18 | "Angel of the Morning" | Juice Newton | 4 | May 2 | 6 |
| May 2 | "Bette Davis Eyes" (#1) | Kim Carnes | 1 | May 16 | 14 |
| May 2 | "Living Inside Myself" | Gino Vannelli | 6 | May 30 | 7 |
| May 2 | "I Can't Stand It" | Eric Clapton | 10 | May 2 | 2 |
| May 9 | "Sukiyaki" | A Taste of Honey | 3 | June 13 | 8 |
| May 9 | "Take It on the Run" | REO Speedwagon | 5 | May 30 | 6 |
| May 16 | "Too Much Time on My Hands" | Styx | 9 | May 23 | 3 |
| May 23 | "Stars on 45 (Medley)" | Stars on 45 | 1 | June 20 | 8 |
| May 23 | "Watching the Wheels" | John Lennon | 10 | May 23 | 2 |
| May 30 | "A Woman Needs Love (Just Like You Do)" | Ray Parker Jr. & Raydio | 4 | June 20 | 6 |
| June 6 | "America" | Neil Diamond | 8 | June 13 | 4 |
| June 6 | "Sweetheart" | Franke and the Knockouts | 10 | June 6 | 2 |
| June 13 | "All Those Years Ago" | George Harrison | 2 | July 4 | 6 |
| June 20 | "The One That You Love" | Air Supply | 1 | July 25 | 8 |
| June 20 | "Jessie's Girl" (#5) | Rick Springfield | 1 | August 1 | 12 |
| June 20 | "You Make My Dreams" | Hall & Oates | 5 | July 4 | 6 |
| June 27 | "Elvira" | The Oak Ridge Boys | 5 | July 25 | 8 |
| July 4 | "Believe It or Not (Theme from The Greatest American Hero)" | Joey Scarbury | 2 | August 15 | 10 |
| July 4 | "I Don't Need You" | Kenny Rogers | 3 | August 15 | 8 |
| July 11 | "Slow Hand" | The Pointer Sisters | 2 | August 29 | 11 |
| July 18 | "The Boy from New York City" | The Manhattan Transfer | 7 | August 8 | 6 |
| July 25 | "Hearts" | Marty Balin | 8 | August 8 | 4 |
| August 1 | "Queen of Hearts" | Juice Newton | 2 | September 19 | 10 |
| August 8 | "Endless Love" (#2) | Diana Ross and Lionel Richie | 1 | August 15 | 13 |
| August 15 | "(There's) No Gettin' Over Me" | Ronnie Milsap | 5 | September 5 | 8 |
| August 22 | "Stop Draggin' My Heart Around" | Stevie Nicks & Tom Petty | 3 | September 5 | 10 |
| August 22 | "Lady (You Bring Me Up)" | Commodores | 8 | September 5 | 6 |
| August 29 | "Urgent" | Foreigner | 4 | September 5 | 7 |
| August 29 | "Who's Crying Now" | Journey | 4 | October 3 | 8 |
| September 12 | "Arthur's Theme (Best That You Can Do)" | Christopher Cross | 1 | October 17 | 12 |
| September 12 | "Step by Step" | Eddie Rabbitt | 5 | October 17 | 8 |
| September 26 | "Start Me Up" | The Rolling Stones | 2 | October 31 | 11 |
| October 3 | "Hold On Tight" | Electric Light Orchestra | 10 | October 3 | 2 |
| October 10 | "Private Eyes" | Hall & Oates | 1 | November 7 | 9 |
| October 10 | "For Your Eyes Only" | Sheena Easton | 4 | October 17 | 5 |
| October 17 | "The Night Owls" | Little River Band | 6 | November 7 | 6 |
| October 17 | "Hard to Say" | Dan Fogelberg | 7 | October 31 | 4 |
| October 24 | "I've Done Everything for You" | Rick Springfield | 8 | November 7 | 4 |
| October 31 | "Tryin' To Live My Life Without You" | Bob Seger | 5 | November 7 | 5 |
| November 7 | "Waiting for a Girl Like You" | Foreigner | 2 | November 28 | 15 |
| November 7 | "Here I Am" | Air Supply | 5 | November 21 | 6 |
| November 14 | "Physical" | Olivia Newton-John | 1 | November 21 | 15 |
| November 14 | "Hill Street Blues Theme" | Mike Post and Larry Carlton | 10 | November 14 | 2 |
| November 21 | "Every Little Thing She Does Is Magic" | The Police | 3 | December 5 | 4 |
| November 28 | "Oh No" | Commodores | 4 | December 5 | 4 |
| November 28 | "Why Do Fools Fall in Love" | Diana Ross | 7 | December 19 | 6 |
| December 5 | "Let's Groove" | Earth, Wind & Fire | 3 | December 19 | 9 |
| December 5 | "Young Turks" | Rod Stewart | 5 | December 19 | 6 |
| December 12 | "Don't Stop Believin'" | Journey | 9 | December 19 | 4 |

=== 1980 peaks ===
List of Billboard Hot 100 top ten singles in 1981 which peaked in 1980
| Top ten entry date | Single | Artist(s) | Peak | Peak date | Weeks in top ten |
|---|---|---|---|---|---|
| October 25 | "Lady" (#3) | Kenny Rogers | 1 | November 15 | 13 |
| November 15 | "(Just Like) Starting Over" (#4) | John Lennon | 1 | December 27 | 14 |
| November 15 | "More Than I Can Say" | Leo Sayer | 2 | December 6 | 9 |
| December 6 | "Hungry Heart" | Bruce Springsteen | 5 | December 27 | 8 |
| December 13 | "Hit Me with Your Best Shot" | Pat Benatar | 9 | December 20 | 4 |

=== 1982 peaks ===
List of Billboard Hot 100 top ten singles in 1981 which peaked in 1982
| Top ten entry date | Single | Artist(s) | Peak | Peak date | Weeks in top ten |
|---|---|---|---|---|---|
| December 12 | "Harden My Heart" | Quarterflash | 3 | February 13 | 12 |
| December 19 | "I Can't Go for That (No Can Do)" | Hall & Oates | 1 | January 30 | 12 |
| December 19 | "Leather and Lace" | Stevie Nicks and Don Henley | 6 | January 23 | 8 |
| December 26 | "Trouble" | Lindsey Buckingham | 9 | January 16 | 5 |

== See also ==
- 1981 in music
- List of Billboard Hot 100 number ones of 1981
- Billboard Year-End Hot 100 singles of 1981
