= Billboard Year-End Hot 100 singles of 1981 =

Ranking of recorded music

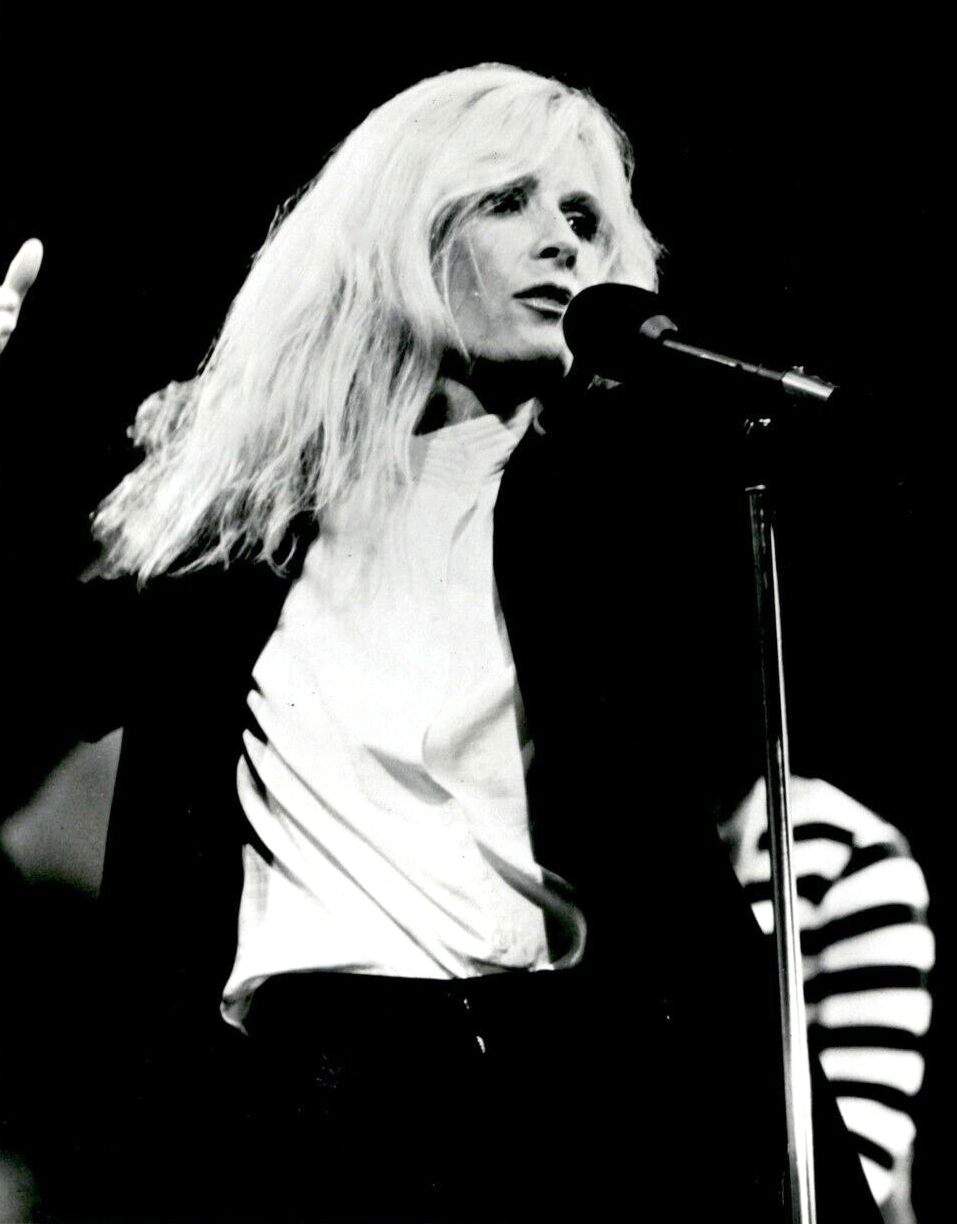
"Bette Davis Eyes" by Kim Carnes was the number one song of 1981.

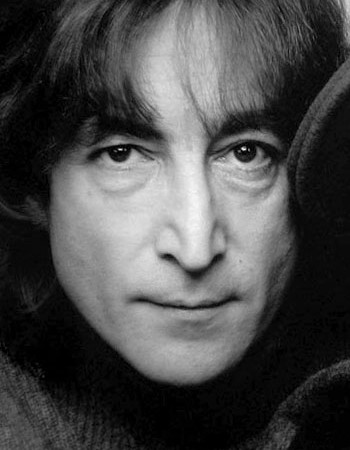
Three songs by John Lennon appear on the Year-End Hot 100, charting posthumously after his murder in late 1980.

This is a list of Billboard magazine's Top Hot 100 songs of 1981. The Top 100, as revealed in the year-end edition of Billboard dated December 26, 1981, is based on Hot 100 charts from the issue dates of November 1, 1980 through October 31, 1981.

No.	Title	Artist(s)
1	"Bette Davis Eyes"	Kim Carnes
2	"Endless Love"	Diana Ross & Lionel Richie
3	"Lady"	Kenny Rogers
4	"(Just Like) Starting Over"	John Lennon
5	"Jessie's Girl"	Rick Springfield
6	"Celebration"	Kool & the Gang
7	"Kiss on My List"	Daryl Hall & John Oates
8	"I Love a Rainy Night"	Eddie Rabbitt
9	"9 To 5"	Dolly Parton
10	"Keep on Loving You"	REO Speedwagon
11	"Theme from The Greatest American Hero (Believe It or Not)"	Joey Scarbury
12	"Morning Train (Nine to Five)"	Sheena Easton
13	"Being with You"	Smokey Robinson
14	"Queen of Hearts"	Juice Newton
15	"Rapture"	Blondie
16	"A Woman Needs Love (Just Like You Do)"	Raydio
17	"The Tide Is High"	Blondie
18	"Just the Two of Us"	Grover Washington, Jr. & Bill Withers
19	"Slow Hand"	The Pointer Sisters
20	"I Love You"	Climax Blues Band
21	"Woman"	John Lennon
22	"Sukiyaki"	A Taste of Honey
23	"The Winner Takes It All"	ABBA
24	"Stars on 45 Medley"	Stars on 45
25	"Angel of the Morning"	Juice Newton
26	"Love on the Rocks"	Neil Diamond
27	"Every Woman in the World"	Air Supply
28	"The One That You Love"	Air Supply
29	"Guilty"	Barbra Streisand & Barry Gibb
30	"The Best of Times"	Styx
31	"Elvira"	The Oak Ridge Boys
32	"Take It on the Run"	REO Speedwagon
33	"(There's) No Gettin' Over Me"	Ronnie Milsap
34	"Living Inside Myself"	Gino Vannelli
35	"Woman in Love"	Barbra Streisand
36	"The Boy from New York City"	The Manhattan Transfer
37	"Urgent"	Foreigner
38	"Passion"	Rod Stewart
39	"Lady (You Bring Me Up)"	Commodores
40	"Crying"	Don McLean
41	"Hearts"	Marty Balin
42	"It's My Turn"	Diana Ross
43	"You Make My Dreams"	Daryl Hall & John Oates
44	"I Don't Need You"	Kenny Rogers
45	"How 'Bout Us"	Champaign
46	"Hit Me with Your Best Shot"	Pat Benatar
47	"The Breakup Song (They Don't Write 'Em)"	The Greg Kihn Band
48	"Time"	The Alan Parsons Project
49	"Hungry Heart"	Bruce Springsteen
50	"Sweetheart"	Franke and the Knockouts
51	"Somebody's Knockin'"	Terri Gibbs
52	"More Than I Can Say"	Leo Sayer
53	"Together"	Tierra
54	"Too Much Time on My Hands"	Styx
55	"What Are We Doin' in Love"	Dottie West & Kenny Rogers
56	"Who's Crying Now"	Journey
57	"De Do Do Do, De Da Da Da"	The Police
58	"This Little Girl"	Gary U.S. Bonds
59	"Stop Draggin' My Heart Around"	Stevie Nicks & Tom Petty
60	"Giving It Up for Your Love"	Delbert McClinton
61	"A Little in Love"	Cliff Richard
62	"America"	Neil Diamond
63	"Ain't Even Done with the Night"	John Cougar
64	"Arthur's Theme (Best That You Can Do)"	Christopher Cross
65	"Another One Bites the Dust"	Queen
66	"Games People Play"	The Alan Parsons Project
67	"I Can't Stand It"	Eric Clapton
68	"While You See a Chance"	Steve Winwood
69	"Master Blaster (Jammin')"	Stevie Wonder
70	"Hello Again"	Neil Diamond
71	"Don't Stand So Close to Me"	The Police
72	"Hey Nineteen"	Steely Dan
73	"I Ain't Gonna Stand for It"	Stevie Wonder
74	"All Those Years Ago"	George Harrison
75	"Step By Step"	Eddie Rabbitt
76	"The Stroke"	Billy Squier
77	"Feels So Right"	Alabama
78	"Sweet Baby"	Stanley Clarke & George Duke
79	"Same Old Lang Syne"	Dan Fogelberg
80	"Cool Love"	Pablo Cruise
81	"Hold On Tight"	Electric Light Orchestra
82	"It's Now or Never"	John Schneider
83	"Treat Me Right"	Pat Benatar
84	"Winning"	Santana
85	"What Kind of Fool"	Barbra Streisand & Barry Gibb
86	"Watching the Wheels"	John Lennon
87	"Tell It Like It Is"	Heart
88	"Smoky Mountain Rain"	Ronnie Milsap
89	"I Made It Through the Rain"	Barry Manilow
90	"You've Lost That Lovin' Feelin'"	Daryl Hall & John Oates
91	"Suddenly"	Olivia Newton-John & Cliff Richard
92	"For Your Eyes Only"	Sheena Easton
93	"The Beach Boys Medley"	The Beach Boys
94	"Whip It"	Devo
95	"Modern Girl"	Sheena Easton
96	"Really Wanna Know You"	Gary Wright
97	"Seven Year Ache"	Rosanne Cash
98	"I'm Coming Out"	Diana Ross
99	"Miss Sun"	Boz Scaggs
100	"Time Is Time"	Andy Gibb

== See also ==
- 1981 in music
- Billboard Year-End Hot Soul Singles of 1981
- List of Billboard Hot 100 number-one singles of 1981
- List of Billboard Hot 100 top-ten singles in 1981
