= Paulinho da Costa =

Brazilian percussionist (born 1948)

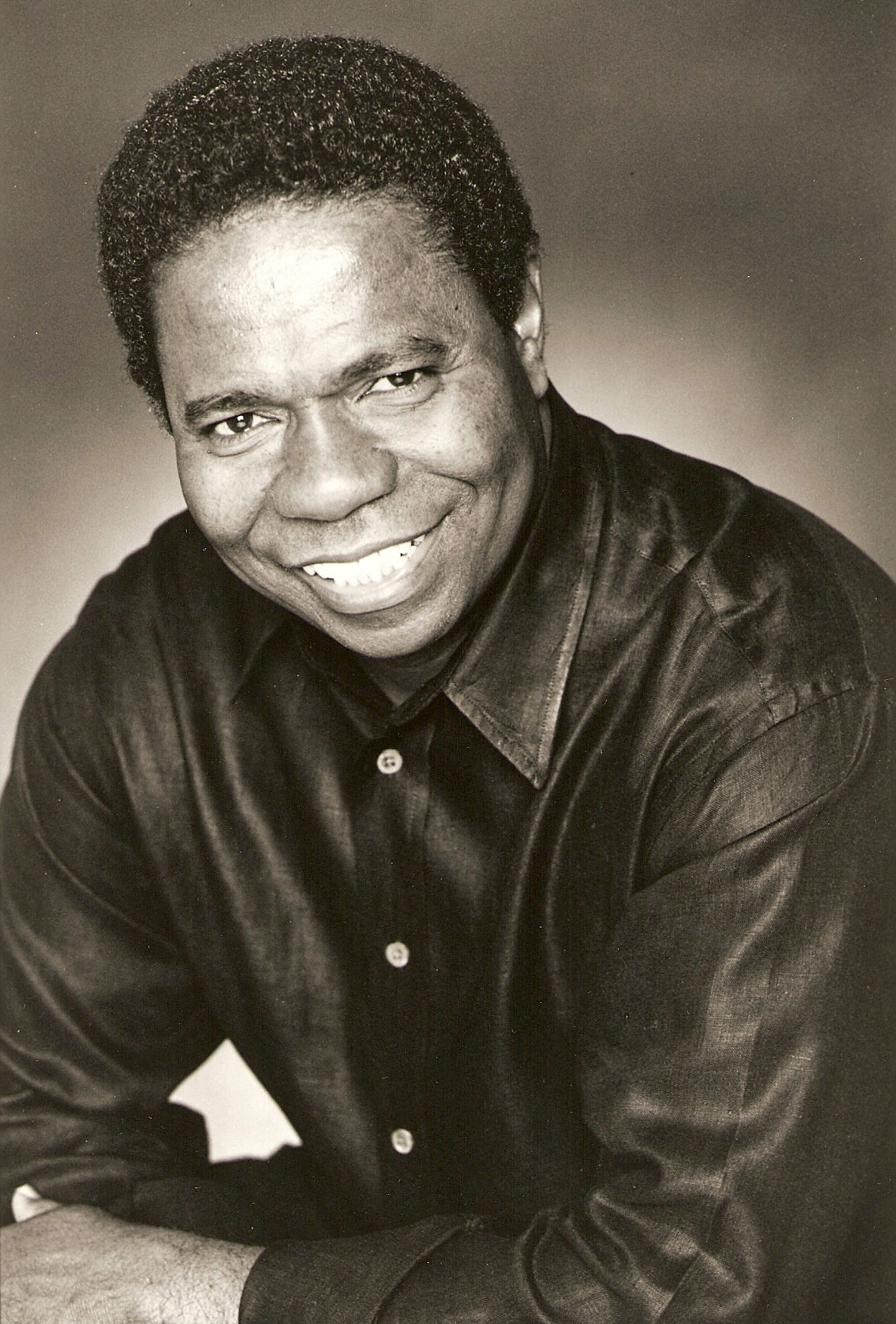
- Da Costa in 2008

Background information
- Born: Paulo Roberto da Costa; May 31, 1948 (age 78); Rio de Janeiro, Brazil
- Genres: Jazz; Latin American music; rock; R&B; pop; adult contemporary; blues; country; disco; yacht rock
- Occupation: Musician
- Instrument: Percussion
- Years active: 1952–present
- Labels: A&M; Concord; Pablo
- Website: paulinho.com

Paulo Roberto da Costa (born May 31, 1948), is a Brazilian percussionist. Beginning his career as a samba musician in Brazil, he moved to the United States in the early 1970s and worked with Brazilian bandleader Sérgio Mendes.

He went on to perform with many American pop, rock and jazz musicians and participated in thousands of albums. DownBeat magazine call him "one of the most talented percussionists of our time." He played on such albums as Earth, Wind & Fire's I Am, Madonna's True Blue, hit singles and movie soundtracks, including Dirty Dancing and Purple Rain among others. He has also performed on Grammy-award winning albums and singles including USA for Africa's "We Are the World" (Album of the Year and Song of the Year), Dionne Warwick & Friends' "That's What Friends Are For" (Song of the Year), Michael Jackson's Thriller (Album of the Year), Celine Dion's Let's Talk About Love (Album of the Year), the Saturday Night Fever soundtrack (Album of the Year), Anita Baker's Giving You the Best That I Got (Best R&B Vocal Performance, Female, Best R&B Song, Album of the Year, Song of the Year) Gloria Gaynor's "I Will Survive" (Best Disco Recording), Rufus and Chaka Khan's "Ain't Nobody" (Best R&B Performance By A Duo Or Group With Vocal), Red Hot Chili Peppers' Stadium Arcadium (Best Rock Album), among others. He has also performed with Diana Krall.

Da Costa plays more than 200 instruments professionally, and has worked in a variety of music genres including Brazilian, blues, Christian, country, disco, gospel, hip-hop, jazz, Latin, pop, rhythm and blues, rock, soul, and world music. He was signed to Norman Granz's Pablo Records for three of his solo albums, Agora, Happy People and Sunrise, as well as Breakdown. Da Costa received the National Academy of Recording Arts and Sciences' Most Valuable Player Award for three consecutive years. He also received the Musicians Emeritus Award.

Da Costa received a star on the Hollywood Walk of Fame on May 13, 2026, becoming the first Brazilian-born person to receive a star.

== Early life and career ==
Paulo Roberto da Costa was born in Irajá, a neighborhood in the city of Rio de Janeiro, Brazil, and as a child began learning the pandeiro. He began performing in the samba parades in Rio de Janeiro and later joined the youth wing of Portela's Bateria, the rhythm section of a samba school. He became one of the most internationally known percussionists to emerge from the Samba Schools of Brazil (Escola de Samba). As a teen, da Costa traveled extensively with samba trios and quartets, Brazilian ensembles and Carnaval orchestras. His association with these groups offered him the opportunity to participate in music festivals around the world, in a troupe led by Jorge Goulart and Nora Ney.

Da Costa further developed his musical ability after being exposed to jazz and Cuban music and expanded the range of percussion instruments he could play. He later toured Europe and the Middle East with a Brazilian ensemble together with Waldir Maia e Alcione in 1970. In 1972, Paulinho participated in the Festival Internacional da Canção in the Maracanãzinho, performing the song Fio Maravilha, written about the soccer player Fio Maravilha, with Maria Alcina.

In 1972, da Costa moved to Los Angeles and played with Sergio Mendes from 1973 until 1976. He was introduced to Norman Granz by Dizzy Gillespie and was signed to Granz' label, Pablo Records. Da Costa's association with Granz and Pablo Records made it possible for him to receive permanent resident status in the US. Da Costa went on to record three solo albums under Pablo Records.

While in Los Angeles, he also worked with other artists and gained notoriety. The first album he recorded in Los Angeles was with a group called the Miracles. He played on their number-one charting song, "Love Machine", in 1975. Da Costa coproduced Ella Abraça Jobim with Ella Fitzgerald. He also worked extensively with Dizzy Gillespie, Joe Pass, and Milt Jackson. Moreover, Da Costa ventured into a variety of genres and recorded with artists such as Earth, Wind & Fire, Donna Summer, Tavares, Michael Jackson, Madonna, Rod Stewart, Lionel Richie and Gloria Gaynor.

Da Costa toured with his band and performed at Montreux Jazz Festival in 1977.

== Session work ==
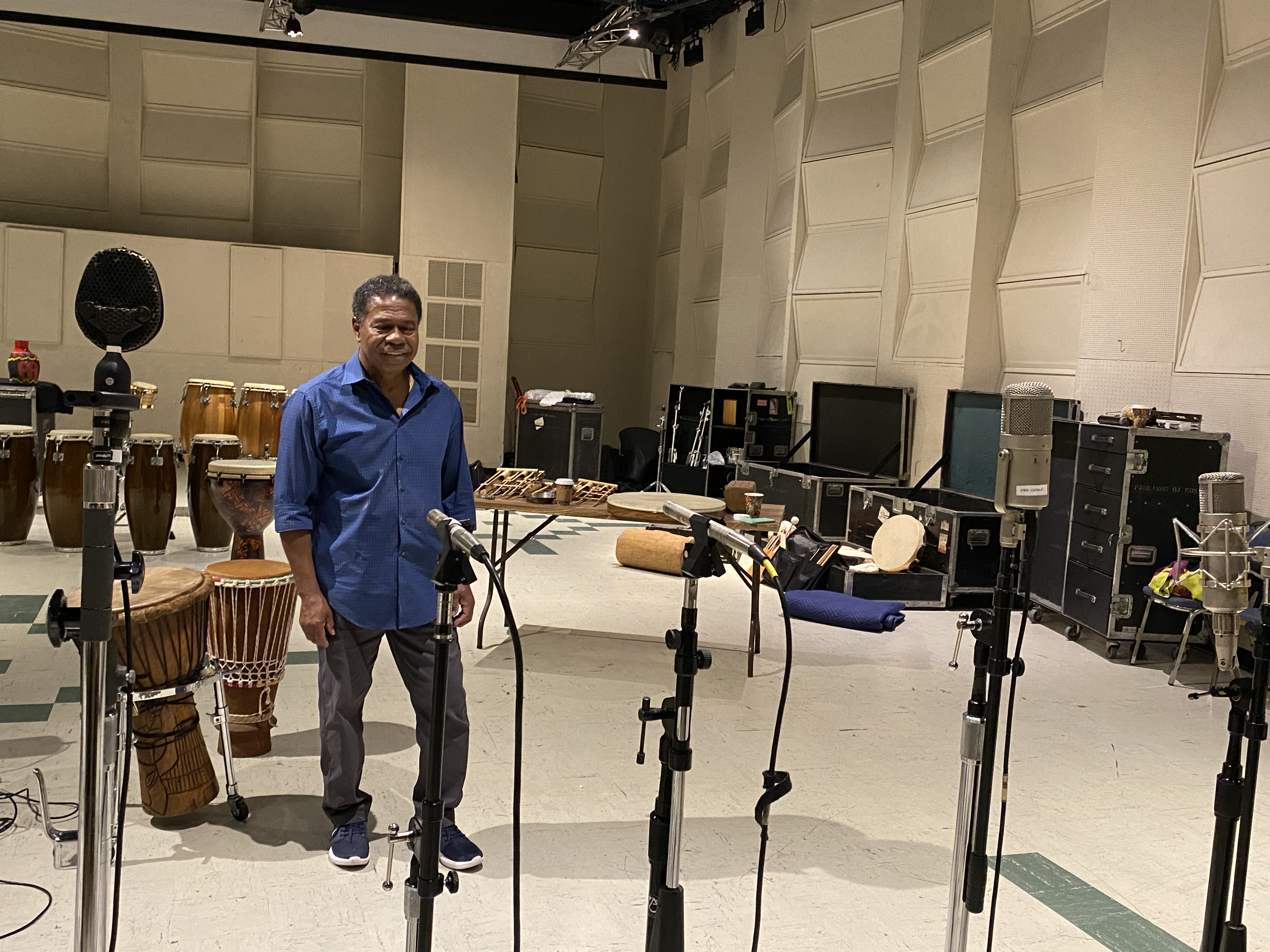
Paulinho da Costa in the recording studio.

The All Music Guide to Jazz: The Definitive Guide to Jazz Music describes da Costa as one of the most in-demand session musicians in Los Angeles studios since the 1970s. He has worked with more than 900 musical artists and bands, performing on drums, bells, whistles and other instruments. He played on Dizzy Gillespie's albums including Free Ride, Dizzy's Party and Bahiana. Da Costa collaborated on several album by the R&B group Earth, Wind & Fire from the 1970s through the 1990s, such as All 'N All, I Am, Faces, Raise!, Powerlight, Millennium and In the Name of Love. He also worked with The Pointer Sisters and their producer Richard Perry on “He's So Shy”, “Slow Hand”, “I'm So Excited”, “Jump (For My Love)” and “Neutron Dance”.

Producer Quincy Jones chose da Costa to work on many projects, including the soundtracks for The Wiz and The Color Purple, as well as Jones's albums The Dude, Basie & Beyond, Back on the Block, Q's Jook Joint and From Q with Love. Da Costa was a regular on the albums that Jones produced, including The Brothers Johnson's Light Up the Night, George Benson's Give Me the Night, Donna Summer's Donna Summer, Barbra Streisand's Till I Loved You and USA for Africa's We Are the World. Michael Jackson called on da Costa for Off the Wall, Thriller, Bad, Dangerous, HIStory: Past, Present and Future, Book I and Invincible.

Da Costa also performed on the albums of numerous Japanese performers, including jazz and J-pop artist Anri (Coool and 16th Summer Breeze), as well as jazz artist Sadao Watanabe (The Best, Front Seat and Sweet Deal),. In addition, da Costa appeared on Hitomi Tohyama's After 5:00 Story and Imagination, Takeshi Itoh's Dear Hearts and Brues For Lee, and Hiroshi Fukumura's Hunt Up Wind.

Da Costa left his mark on the film and industry by contributing to scores such as for Ally McBeal, Flashdance, Footloose, Selena and Sex and the City.

== Performances ==
- 1973–1976 – Sergio Mendes & Brasil '77
- 1977 – Montreux Jazz Festival (with da Costa's band)
- 1984 – Playboy Jazz Festival (with the Yellow Jackets)
- 1987 – The 1st Annual Soul Train Music Awards (with George Duke, David Sanborn, George Benson)
- 1988 – Rosemary Clooney "Singers' Salute to the Songwriters" Dorothy Chandler Pavilion
- 1990 – Lee Ritenour and Friends – Live from the Cocoanut Grove
- 1990 – Rainforest Foundation Benefit Performance at Ted Child's House (Sting, Paul Simon, Don Henley, Bruce Springsteen, Bruce Hornsby, Herbie Hancock, Branford Marsalis)
- 1990 – Nelson Mandela – An International Tribute for a Free South Africa
- 1992 – Music Center, Dorothy Chandler Pavilion (Lalo Shifrin Conductor)
- 1993 – Montreux Jazz Festival (George Duke, Al Jarreau)
- 1994 – The Kennedy Center Concert of the Americas with Quincy Jones, part of the Hemispheric Summit for all the Presidents of the Americas, 34 Countries, 150 performers
- 1995 – A Tribute to Tom Jobim, Avery Fisher Hall, Lincoln Center (Lee Ritenour, Joao Gilberto, Caetano Veloso)
- 1996 – Lalo Schifrin Big Band Schifrin's tribute to Dizzy Gillespie – "The Gillespiana Suite"
- 1997 – Songs And Visions Concert, Wembley Stadium (Tony Hollingsworth, Stewart Levine, Rod Stewart, Jon Bon Jovi, Seal, Mary J. Blige )
- 2001 – Eric Clapton Tour
- 2001 – Diana Krall, Live in Paris, Olympia
- 2006 – JC Penney Jam Concert For America's Kids (Dr. Phil, David Foster)
- 2008 – Montreux Jazz Festival (Quincy's 75th Anniversary)
- 2008 – Diana Krall Live in Rio
- 2010 – Montreux Jazz Festival (Quincy Jones & The Global Gumbo All-Stars)
- 2010 – Herbie Hancock's Seven Decades at the Hollywood Bowl
- 2012 – Mawazine Rhythms of the World Festival in Rabat, Morocco
- 2013 – Power of Love Gala, Cleveland Clinic Lou Ruvo Center, MGM (Stevie Wonder, Jennifer Hudson, Chaka Khan, Bono, ChrisTucker, Amy Poehler, Arsenio Hall, Whoopi Goldberg)

== Discography ==
Album	Label	Released	Notes
Agora	Pablo Records	1977	
Tudo Bem!	Pablo Records	1978	with Joe Pass
Happy People	Pablo Records	1979	
Paulinho da Costa	Globo	1984	
Sunrise	Pablo Records	1984	
Breakdown	A&M Records	1991	

== Selected discography of collaborations as a session musician ==
Artist	Song title	Album
Bill Medley & Jennifer Warnes	"(I've Had) The Time of My Life"	Dirty Dancing (Soundtrack)
Dionne Warwick (feat. Elton John, Gladys Knight & Stevie Wonder)	"That's What Friends Are For"	Friends
Lionel Richie	"All Night Long (All Night)"	Can't Slow Down
Earth, Wind & Fire	"September"	The Best of Earth, Wind & Fire, Vol. 1
Kenny Loggins	"Footloose"	Footloose (1984 soundtrack)
Whitney Houston	"Greatest Love of All"	Whitney Houston
Lionel Richie	"Hello"	Can’t Slow Down
Rod Stewart	"Da Ya Think I'm Sexy?"	Blondes Have More Fun
Rod Stewart	"Passion"	Foolish Behaviour
Patti La Belle, Michael McDonald	"On My Own"	Winner In You
Madonna	"La Isla Bonita"	True Blue
Michael Jackson	"Billie Jean"	Thriller
Diana Ross	"Missing You"	Swept Away
Earth, Wind & Fire	"Fantasy"	All'N'All
Commodores	"Nightshift"	Nightshift
Michael Jackson	"Beat It"	Thriller
Luther Vandross	"Give Me the Reason"	Give Me the Reason
The Pointers Sisters	"I'm So Excited!"	So Excited!
Michael Jackson	"Human Nature"	Thriller
The Jacksons	"This Place Hotel"	Triumph
Yarbrought & People	"Don't Stop the Music (Yarbrough and Peoples song)"	The Two of Us
Quincy Jones	"Just Once"	The Dude
Rufus, Chaka Khan	"Ain't Nobody"	Stompin' At The Savoy - Live
Kenny Loggins	"This is It"	Keep the Fire
Tavares	"More Than a Woman"	Saturday Night Fever (soundtrack)
Michael Jackson	"Don't Stop ’Til You Get Enough"	Off the Wall
Joe Cocker & Jennifer Warnes	"Up Where We Belong"	An Officer and a Gentleman (soundtrack)
George Benson	"Give Me the Night"	Give Me the Night
Anita Baker	"Sweet Love"	Rapture
The Brothers Johnson	"Stomp!"	Light Up the Night
Michael Jackson	"Wanna Be Startin' Somethin’"	Thriller
U.S.A. For Africa	"We Are the World"	We Are the World
Donna Summer	"State of Independence"	Donna Summer
Luther Vandross	"So Amazing"	Give Me the Reason
Patti La Belle	"Oh, People"	Winner In You
Christopher Cross	"Arthur's Theme (Best You Can Do)"	Arthur — The Album
Seal	"Crazy"	Seal
Madonna	"Open Your Heart"	True Blue
Michael Jackson	"Bad"	Bad
The Emotions	"Best of My Love"	Rejoice
Deniece Williams	"Let's Hear It for the Boy"	Let's Hear It for the Boy
Peaches & Herb	"Shake Your Groove Thing"	2 Hot
Gloria Gaynor	"I Will Survive"	Love Tracks
DeBarge	"Rhythm of the Night"	Rhythm of the Night
The Miracles	"Love Machine"	City of Angels
Julio Iglesias, Willie Nelson	"To All The Girls I've Loved Before"	1100 Bel Air Place
Red Hot Chili Peppers	"Snow (Hey Oh)"	Stadium Arcadium
The Pointer Sisters	"Jump (For My Love)"	Break Out
Belinda Carlisle	"Heaven Is a Place on Earth"	Heaven on Earth
Michael Jackson	"Off the Wall"	Off the Wall
Magnum		Goodnight L.A.

== Sources ==
- Kun, Josh, ed. (2017). The Tide Was Always High: The Music of Latin America in Los Angeles. University of California Press. ISBN 978-0-520-29440-0.
