= Sunrise (Paulinho da Costa album) =

Studio album by Paulinho da Costa
- Released: 1984
- Studio: Ocean Way Recording (Hollywood, California); Lighthouse Studios (Studio City, California)
- Genre: Jazz, world
- Length: 39:37
- Label: Pablo Today
- Producer: Paulinho da Costa

Paulinho da Costa chronology
Happy People (1979)	Sunrise (1984)	Breakdown (1990)

Professional ratings
Review scores
Source	Rating
AllMusic	2/5 stars

Sunrise is the third solo album by Brazilian percussionist Paulinho da Costa, released in 1984 by Pablo Records.

== Track listing ==
Side A
No.	Title	Writer(s)	Length
1.	"Taj Mahal"	Jorge Ben Jor	3:45
2.	"I'm Going to Rio"	Clarence Charles	4:05
3.	"African Sunrise"	Clarence Charles	3:40
4.	"Walkman"	Paulinho da Costa, Erich Bulling	4:35
5.	"O Mar É Meu Chão"	Dori Caymmi, Nelson Motta	2:45

Side B
No.	Title	Writer(s)	Length
6.	"You Came Into My Life"	Clarence Charles, Dave Iwataki	3:28
7.	"My Love"	Paulinho da Costa, Clarence Charles	4:42
8.	"You've Got A Special Kind Of Love"	Clarence Charles	5:09
9.	"Carioca"	Paulinho da Costa, Clarence Charles	4:55
10.	"Groove"	Paulinho da Costa, Clarence Charles	4:01

== Personnel ==
Musicians

- Paulinho da Costa – percussion, percussion arrangements, rhythm arrangements (2, 10), Prophet-5 (5)
- Randy Waldman – electric piano (1, 8), keyboards (2–6), acoustic piano (7–9)
- George Duke – clavinet (1), melodion (5), Prophet-5 (8), Minimoog bass (10)
- Todd Cochrane – electric piano (7, 9), rhythm arrangements (7, 9)
- Craig Harris – vocoder (8)
- Clarence Charles – guitars (1–8, 10), rhythm arrangements (2, 10), acoustic guitar solo (9)
- Charles Fearing – guitars (1, 3–9)
- Larry Carlton – guitar solo (7), guitars (8, 9)
- Nathan East – bass (1, 2, 4, 6, 8)
- Abraham Laboriel – bass (3, 5, 7, 9)
- John Robinson – drums (1, 2, 4, 6, 8, 10)
- Leon "Ndugu" Chancler – drums (3, 5, 7, 9)
- Ernie Watts – saxophone (1, 6, 8), flutes (3)
- Bill Reichenbach Jr. – trombone (9)
- Jerry Hey – flugelhorn (9)
- Erich Bulling – rhythm arrangements (1, 4, 6, 8)
- Benjamin Wright – rhythm arrangements (3, 5)

Horn section (Tracks 1, 2, 4, 6–8 & 10)

- Erich Bulling – horn arrangements (1, 4, 6, 8)
- Jerry Hey – horn arrangements (2, 7, 10)
- Eric Culver, Chuck Findley, Dick Hyde and Bill Reichenbach Jr. – trombone
- Gary Grant, Jerry Hey and Steve Madaio – trumpet

Vocalists

- Paulinho da Costa – vocals (1, 4), backing vocals (2)
- Carl Carwell – vocals (1, 4), lead vocals (2, 6, 8), backing vocals (8)
- Clarence Charles – vocals (1, 4)
- Winston Ford – backing vocals (2, 6, 8)
- Roy Galloway – backing vocals (2, 6, 8)
- Arthur Hutchinson – backing vocals (2, 8)
- Judy Jones – backing vocals (2, 6, 8)
- Todd Cochrane – vocals (4)

== Production ==
- Paulinho da Costa – producer
- Allen Sides – engineer, mixing
- Rik Pekkonen – mixing
- Tony Chiappa – second engineer
- Steve Crimmel – second engineer
- David Egerton – second engineer
- Bobby Macias – second engineer
- Bernie Grundman – mastering at A&M Studios (Hollywood, California)
- Jim Britt – photography
- Norman Granz – design, layout
- Sheldon Marks – design, layout
