= List of Billboard number-one R&B albums of 1981 =

These are the Billboard magazine R&B albums to reach number-one in 1981.

== Chart history ==
| Issue date | Album | Artis |
|---|---|---|
| January 3 | Hotter Than July | Stevie Wonder |
| January 10 | Hotter Than July | Stevie Wonder |
| January 17 | Hotter Than July | Stevie Wonder |
| January 24 | Hotter Than July | Stevie Wonder |
| January 31 | Hotter Than July | Stevie Wonder |
| February 7 | Hotter Than July | Stevie Wonder |
| February 14 | Hotter Than July | Stevie Wonder |
| February 21 | The Gap Band III | The Gap Band |
| February 28 | The Gap Band III | The Gap Band |
| March 7 | The Two of Us | Yarbrough & Peoples |
| March 14 | The Two of Us | Yarbrough & Peoples |
| March 21 | The Gap Band III | The Gap Band |
| March 28 | The Gap Band III | The Gap Band |
| April 4 | The Gap Band III | The Gap Band |
| April 11 | The Gap Band III | The Gap Band |
| April 18 | Being with You | Smokey Robinson |
| April 25 | Being with You | Smokey Robinson |
| May 2 | Being with You | Smokey Robinson |
| May 9 | Being with You | Smokey Robinson |
| May 16 | Being with You | Smokey Robinson |
| May 23 | A Woman Needs Love | Raydio featuring Ray Parker Jr. |
| May 30 | A Woman Needs Love | Raydio featuring Ray Parker Jr. |
| June 6 | Street Songs | Rick James |
| June 13 | Street Songs | Rick James |
| June 20 | Street Songs | Rick James |
| June 27 | Street Songs | Rick James |
| July 4 | Street Songs | Rick James |
| July 11 | Street Songs | Rick James |
| July 18 | Street Songs | Rick James |
| July 25 | Street Songs | Rick James |
| August 1 | Street Songs | Rick James |
| August 8 | Street Songs | Rick James |
| August 15 | Street Songs | Rick James |
| August 22 | Street Songs | Rick James |
| August 29 | Street Songs | Rick James |
| September 5 | Street Songs | Rick James |
| September 12 | Street Songs | Rick James |
| September 19 | Street Songs | Rick James |
| September 26 | Street Songs | Rick James |
| October 3 | Street Songs | Rick James |
| October 10 | Street Songs | Rick James |
| October 17 | Street Songs | Rick James |
| October 24 | Breakin' Away | Al Jarreau |
| October 31 | Breakin' Away | Al Jarreau |
| November 7 | The Many Facets of Roger | Roger |
| November 14 | Never Too Much | Luther Vandross |
| November 21 | Something Special | Kool and the Gang |
| November 28 | Raise! | Earth, Wind and Fire |
| December 5 | Raise! | Earth, Wind and Fire |
| December 12 | Raise! | Earth, Wind and Fire |
| December 19 | Raise! | Earth, Wind and Fire |
| December 26 | Raise! | Earth, Wind and Fire |

== See also ==
- 1981 in music
- R&B number-one hits of 1981 (USA)
