= (I've Had) The Time of My Life =

Theme song of the 1987 film Dirty Dancing

- US single

Single by Bill Medley and Jennifer Warnes

from the album Dirty Dancing: Original Soundtrack from the Vestron Motion Picture
- B-side: "Love Is Strange"; by Mickey & Sylvia
- Released: July 10, 1987
- Studio: Los Angeles, California
- Genre: Dance-rock; soft rock
- Length: 6:46; 4:50 (LP and single version)
- Label: RCA
- Songwriters: John DeNicola; Donald Markowitz; Franke Previte
- Producer: Michael Lloyd

Bill Medley singles chronology
"Loving on Borrowed Time" (1986)	"(I've Had) The Time of My Life" (1987)	"He Ain't Heavy, He's My Brother" (1988)

Jennifer Warnes singles chronology
"Bird on the Wire" (1987)	"(I've Had) The Time of My Life" (1987)	"Rock You Gently" (1992)

Music video
- "(I've Had) The Time of My Life" on YouTube

"(I've Had) The Time of My Life" is a song composed by Franke Previte, John DeNicola, and Donald Markowitz. It was recorded by American singers Bill Medley and Jennifer Warnes and used as the theme song for the 1987 film Dirty Dancing. The song has won a number of awards, including the Academy Award for Best Original Song, the Golden Globe Award for Best Original Song, and the Grammy Award for Best Pop Performance by a Duo or Group with Vocals.

== History ==
Singer-songwriter Previte was the lead singer of the band Franke and the Knockouts. He had success with the song "Sweetheart" in 1981, but by 1986 was without a recording contract. In late 1986 or early 1987, producer and head of Millennium Records, Jimmy Ienner, asked Previte about writing some music for "a little movie called Dirty Dancing". Previte initially turned the request down because he was still trying to get a record deal, and he thought the film was a pornographic film based on the title, but Ienner was persistent, declaring that it would "change his life", and got Previte to write several songs for the film, including "Hungry Eyes", later recorded by singer Eric Carmen, which also became a top 10 hit.

Previte wrote the lyrics, and the music was written by John DeNicola and Don Markowitz. He compared writing the song to the writing process of "MacArthur Park". The title was conceived at random while he was traveling down the Garden State Parkway. He suggested that Ienner's pleading inspired the lyric. After getting further approval, Previte, along with DeNicola and Markowitz, created a demo of the song, performing on it himself, along with singer Rachele Cappelli. The demo showcased how the harmonies were to be used, employing a "cold open", or a slow build-up of the song to its finale.

A song by Lionel Richie was initially planned to be used as the finale of Dirty Dancing, but choreographer Kenny Ortega and his assistant Miranda Garrison (who also played Vivian in the film) selected "The Time of My Life" instead. This demo wasn't used in the final cut of the film − the more polished version with Warnes and Medley was. However, because the Warnes/Medley track was not ready by the time the finale was filmed (it was shot first, due to the tight budget), Previte and Cappelli's much lighter and more youthful version was used as a backing track, so that the actors, Patrick Swayze and Jennifer Grey, and the dancers, could have something to dance to. (Swayze later remarked that it was his favorite version, even including all the subsequent remakes.) The demo version finally appeared on the 1998 CD reissue of Previte's 1981 album Franke and the Knockouts, but is only listed as a "Bonus Track".

The movie's writer, Eleanor Bergstein, wanted a famous 1960s singer to perform it to blend then-contemporary musical elements with the aesthetics of the period. The song was initially intended for Donna Summer and Joe Esposito, but Summer turned it down because she did not like the title of the film. Afterwards, producer Michael Lloyd approached Richie, Daryl Hall of Hall & Oates and singer-songwriter Kim Carnes to perform; they declined as well. Meanwhile, Bill Medley of the Righteous Brothers was approached by Jimmy Ienner repeatedly over two months to do the recording, but he also turned it down because his daughter McKenna was due to be born, and he had promised his wife he would be there. He was also concerned about appearing in another song that would flop (as had happened with "Loving on Borrowed Time" with Gladys Knight, from the soundtrack for Cobra) and also thought the film's title was "like a bad porno movie".

Ienner then approached Jennifer Warnes, who had released a cover of Leonard Cohen songs the previous year. She initially expressed reluctance upon hearing Previte's demo but was persuaded (because of Ienner offering a large sum of money) by her then-boyfriend to take the offer, on the condition that she could sing it with Medley, whom she admired. As a result, after the birth of his daughter, Medley was approached again, this time with Warnes' offer. Medley then agreed to record the track. Stephen Holden of The New York Times compared the duo of Medley and Warnes to the lead characters' romance in Dirty Dancing, for a "blend of the earthy and the pristine".

To give emotional depth to the song, Warnes had a video playback machine and footage of the final scene brought in to synchronize her singing with the movie's ending scene, particularly "the lift". After completing the main vocals, Medley and Warnes were asked by Lloyd to add additional harmonies and flourishes for the song. The song was completed in around one hour. The resulting mix was described as a "Righteous Brothers-type song" by DeNicola.

The song was originally released on July 10, 1987; it was intended to be released alongside the film, but the film's producer Vestron Pictures had moved the American release date to August without notifying RCA Records. Ienner quickly edited the song from the original 6:46 to 4:50 for radio airplay. Initially, radio stations were reluctant to add the song before the release of Dirty Dancing. With the release of the film it became a worldwide hit and is one of the most frequently played songs on radio.

== Music video ==
A music video was produced for this song in October 1987. The video features Medley and Warnes along with several couples dancing like in the movie, and it also featured clips from it.

== Personnel ==
- Bill Medley – lead vocals
- Jennifer Warnes – lead vocals and additional backing vocals
- Michael Lloyd - keyboards (probably)
- Gary Herbig – saxophone solo
- Laurence Juber – guitar
- Dennis Belfield – bass
- Paul Leim – drums
- Paulinho Da Costa – percussion
- Marcy Levy – backing vocals
- Produced by Michael Lloyd
- Arranged by Gene Page; additional arrangements by Michael Lloyd and John D'Andrea
- Recording (at The Village Recorder) and Mix by Carmine Rubino; First engineer: Dan Nebenzal (Second engineer: Jeff DeMorris)
- Pavel Farkas, Concertmaster, Lo 47 AFM contract leader
- John Edward Acosta, Lo 47 AFM cello
- Remixed by Carmine Rubino, Dan Nebenzal, Jimmy Ienner and Michael Lloyd
- Published by Knockout Music Inc., Jemava Music Corp., Donald Jay Music and R U Cyrius Music.

== Reception ==
=== Critical reception ===
Robert Christgau panned the song as having "technocratic ardors", in a review grading the Dirty Dancing soundtrack a D.

In 2004, the American Film Institute ranked "Time of My Life" 86th in AFI's 100 Years...100 Songs, its list of the 100 greatest songs written for film.

In a 2009 retrospective about movie theme songs, Leah Greenblatt of Entertainment Weekly ranked "Time of My Life" as "great schlock". Greenblatt also described it as "oddly '80s" for a film set in 1963. Then in 2023, Lindsay Martell of Entertainment Weekly ranked Dirty Dancing as having the fourth best movie soundtrack of the 1980s and called "Time of My Life" the "unofficial anthem for every dreamy-eyed teen in the summer of '87".

Tim McNelis, film studies lecturer at the University of Liverpool, defended the inclusion of "Time of My Life" in Dirty Dancing, describing Medley's voice as having "a rough timbre that approximates classic soul singers more than any of the other new songs in the film".

=== Chart performance ===
In the United States, the single topped the Billboard Hot 100 chart in November 1987 for one week and also reached number one on the Adult Contemporary for four weeks. In the United Kingdom the song had two chart outings: in November 1987, after the film's initial release, the song peaked at No. 6; in January 1991, after the film was shown on mainstream television, the song reached No. 8.

== Awards ==
- Academy Award for Best Original Song, 1987
- Grammy Award for Best Pop Performance by a Duo or Group with Vocals, 1988
- Golden Globe Award for Best Original Song, 1988
- ASCAP "Most Performed Songs from Motion Pictures" and "ASCAP Songwriter Of The Year" for its writer.

== Formats and track listings ==
- 7" single
1. "(I've Had) The Time of My Life" – 4:47
2. "Love Is Strange" by Mickey & Sylvia – 2:52
- 12" maxi and cassette
1. "(I've Had) The Time of My Life" – 4:47
2. "In the Still of the Night" by The Five Satins – 2:59
3. "Love Is Strange" by Mickey & Sylvia – 2:53
4. "Overload" by Zappacosta – 3:39
- CD single
1. "(I've Had) The Time of My Life" – 6:50
2. "In the Still of the Night" by The Five Satins – 3:05
3. "Love Is Strange" by Mickey & Sylvia – 2:52
4. "Overload" by Zappacosta – 3:39

== Charts ==
=== Weekly charts ===
Chart (1987–1988)	Peak position
Australia (Australian Music Report)	1
Austria (Ö3 Austria Top 40)	3
Belgium (Ultratop 50 Flanders)	1
Canada (The Record)	2
Canada Top Singles (RPM)	1
Canada Adult Contemporary (RPM)	3
Europe (European Hot 100 Singles)	8
Finland (Suomen virallinen lista)	21
Ireland (IRMA)	5
Italy Airplay (Music & Media)	3
Netherlands (Dutch Top 40)	1
Netherlands (Single Top 100)	1
New Zealand (Recorded Music NZ)	3
South Africa (Springbok Radio)	1
Spain (AFYVE)	5
Sweden (Sverigetopplistan)	12
Switzerland (Schweizer Hitparade)	5
UK Singles (Official Charts)	6
US Billboard Hot 100	1
US Adult Contemporary (Billboard)	1
West Germany (GfK)	5

Chart (1991)	Peak position
Europe (Eurochart Hot 100)	33
Ireland (IRMA)	17
UK Singles (Official Charts)	8
UK Airplay (Music Week)	15

Chart (1992)	Peak position
Europe (Eurochart Hot 100)	28
France (SNEP)	5

Chart (1993)	Peak position
France (SNEP)	48

Chart (2007)	Peak position
UK Singles Downloads (Official Charts)	81

Chart (2013)	Peak position
Slovenia (SloTop50)	16

Chart (2017)	Peak position
Poland Airplay (ZPAV)	40

=== Year-end charts ===
Chart (1987)	Position
Canada Top Singles (RPM)	32
US Billboard Hot 100	27

Chart (1988)	Position
Australia (ARIA)	1
Austria (Ö3 Austria Top 40)	28
Belgium (Ultratop)	1
Europe (Eurochart Hot 100)	62
Netherlands (Dutch Top 40)	1
Netherlands (Single Top 100)	2
New Zealand (RIANZ)	37
South Africa (Springbok Radio)	2
US Adult Contemporary (Billboard)	12
West Germany (Media Control)	25

=== All-time charts ===
All-time chart rankings for "(I've Had) The Time of My Life"
Chart	Rank
Dutch Love Songs (Dutch Top 40)	19

== Certifications ==
Certifications for "(I've Had) The Time of My Life"
Region	Certification	Certified units/sales
Australia (ARIA)	Gold	35,000^{^}
Brazil (Pro-Música Brasil)	Gold	30,000^{‡}
Canada (Music Canada)	Gold	50,000^{^}
Denmark (IFPI Danmark)	Platinum	90,000^{‡}
Germany (BVMI)	Gold	250,000^{‡}
Italy (FIMI)	Gold	25,000^{‡}
Netherlands (NVPI)	Platinum	100,000^{^}
New Zealand (RMNZ)	Platinum	20,000^{*}
United Kingdom (BPI)	Platinum	600,000^{‡}
United States (RIAA)	Gold	500,000^{^}
^{*} Sales figures based on certification alone.^{^} Shipments figures based on certification alone.^{‡} Sales+streaming figures based on certification alone.

== Other versions ==
- The Black Eyed Peas' 2010 single "The Time (Dirty Bit)" features interpolations of the song performed by Will.i.am and Fergie.
- In the ninth episode of the second season of Glee, "Special Education", the New Directions performed this song. It was released as a single from Glee: The Music, Volume 4 and peaked at No. 38 in the Billboard Hot 100.
- Medley re-recorded the song with his daughter McKenna in 2016, and released it under the Righteous Brothers name as part of their eponymous album with Bucky Heard.
- One of the writers of the song, John DeNicola, released his own version of "(I've Had) The Time of My Life" on his debut album The Why Because, released in 2019.

== See also ==
- List of Hot 100 number-one singles of 1987 (U.S.)
- List of number-one adult contemporary singles of 1987 (U.S.)
- List of number-one singles in Australia during the 1980s
- List of Dutch Top 40 number-one singles of 1988
