= Without You (Not Another Lonely Night) =

Single by Franke and the Knockouts

from the album Below the Belt
- B-side: "Tell Me Why"
- Released: March 1982
- Genre: Soft rock
- Label: Millennium Records
- Songwriter(s): Franke Previte, D. Levinsohn, W. Elworthy
- Producer(s): Steve Verroca

Franke and the Knockouts singles chronology
"You're My Girl" (1981)	"Without You (Not Another Lonely Night)" (1982)

"Without You (Not Another Lonely Night)" is a 1982 song by Franke and the Knockouts. It peaked at number 24 on the U.S. Billboard Hot 100 and number 22 Cash Box during the spring of that year. It spent 15 weeks on the charts and became their second biggest hit single.

Internationally, "Without You" charted only in Canada, narrowly missing the top 40.

== Charts ==
Chart (1981)	Peak position
Canada RPM Top Singles	45
U.S. Billboard Hot 100	24
U.S. Cash Box Top 100	22
