= Happy People =

Happy People may refer to:

- Happy People: A Year in the Taiga, a 2010 film by Werner Herzog

== Albums ==
- Happy People (Paulinho da Costa album) or the title song, 1979
- Happy People (Peace album) or the title song, 2015
- Happy People/U Saved Me or the title song (see below), by R. Kelly, 2004
- The Happy People or the title track, by the Cannonball Adderley Quintet, 1972
- Happy People (Kenny Garrett album) or the title track, 2002
- Happy People or the title song, by Offer Nissim, 2008

== Songs ==
- "Happy People" (R. Kelly song), 2004
- "Happy People" (Little Big Town song), 2017
- "Happy People" (Prince Ital Joe and Marky Mark song), 1993
- "Happy People" (The Temptations song), 1974
- "Happy People", by Aṣa from Lucid, 2019
- "Happy People", by Pet Shop Boys from Hotspot, 2020
- "Happy People", by Tokio Hotel from 2001, 2022
- "Happy People", by Yazoo from You and Me Both, 1983
