= Don't Waste Your Time =

Don't Waste Your Time may refer to:

- "Don't Waste Your Time" (Kelly Clarkson song), 2007
- "Don't Waste Your Time" (Yarbrough & Peoples song), 1984
- "Don't Waste Your Time", a song by Mary J. Blige and Aretha Franklin from Mary
- Don't Waste Your Time, an EP by Unto Others (band)
