= Agora (Paulinho da Costa album) =

Studio album by Paulinho da Costa
- Released: 1977
- Recorded: Ocean Way/Wild Tracks
- Genres: Jazz; Latin
- Length: 39:00
- Labels: Pablo Records; Concord Records
- Producers: Claudio Slon, Paulinho da Costa

Professional ratings
Review scores
Source	Rating
AllMusic	3/5 stars

Agora ("Now") is a solo album by the Brazilian percussionist Paulinho da Costa. It was released in 1977 via Pablo Records.

== Critical reception ==
AllMusic wrote that "those phobic to memories of avocado shag carpeting will want to avoid Agora, but it's worth checking out for both hipster ironists and Brazilian jazz fans." Gramophone called the album "full of intricate and exotic rhythms."

== Track listing ==
1. "Simbora" (Paulinho da Costa, Claudio Slon) – 8:48
2. "Terra" (Paulinho da Costa, Octavio Bailly, Jr., Claudio Slon) – 4:25
3. "Toledo Bagel" (Paulinho da Costa, Erich Bulling, Claudio Slon) – 5:53
4. "Berimbau Variations" (Paulinho da Costa, Octavio Bailly, Jr., Claudio Slon) – 3:53
5. "Belisco" (Erich Bulling) – 6:39
6. "Ritmo Number One" (Paulinho da Costa, Claudio Slon) – 8:28

== Personnel ==
- Paulinho da Costa - Percussion, Arranger, Vocals, Lyricist, Bongos, Conga, Pandeiro, Ocarina, Triangle, Whistle, Tambourim, Berimbau, Repique, Surdo, Cuica, Reco-Reco, Shaker, Guiro, Wood Block, Waterphone, Bell Tree, Cabasa, Agogo, Spoons, Frying Pan, African Shakers
- Erich Bulling - Arranger
- Greg Phillinganes - Piano, Keyboards, Electric Piano
- Claudio Slon - Synthesizer, Percussion, Arranger, Drums, Timbales, Vocals, Lyricist, Water Drums, Synthesized Percussion
- Lee Ritenour - Guitar
- Octavio Bailly Jr. - Bass, Vocals
- Gene Goe - Trumpet, Flugelhorn
- Steve Huffsteter - Trumpet, Arranger, Flugelhorn
- Larry Williams - Flute, Saxophone
- Mike Julian - Trombone
- Frank Rosolino - Trombone

== Production ==
- Claudio Slon - Producer
- Paulinho da Costa - Producer
- Humberto Gatica - Engineer
- Geoff Gillette - Engineer
- Phil Stern - Photography
- Phil De Lancie - Digital Remastering
