= The Two of Us (Yarbrough & Peoples album) =

Studio album by Yarbrough & Peoples
- Released: October 1980
- Recorded: 1980
- Studio: Total Experience Recording Studios (Hollywood, California)
- Genre: R&B; soul; funk; boogie
- Length: 42:11
- Label: Mercury
- Producer: Lonnie Simmons; Jonah Ellis; Malvin Dino Vice

Yarbrough & Peoples chronology
The Two of Us (1980)	Heartbeats (1983)

Singles from The Two of Us
- 1. "Don't Stop The Music" Released: October 1980; 2. "Third Degree" Released: June 1981

The Two of Us is the debut album by the R&B duo Yarbrough & Peoples, released in 1980 on Mercury Records. It was produced by LA based producer Lonnie Simmons, who would go on to form Total Experience Records the following year, and veteran songwriter Jonah Ellis.

== Reception ==
Professional ratings
Review scores
Source	Rating
AllMusic	3/5 stars

The Two of Us contained the couple's biggest hit, "Don't Stop the Music", which went to No. 1 on the R&B chart, No. 26 on the dance chart, and No. 19 on the pop chart. The album peaked at No. 1 on the R&B Chart and No. 16 on the pop charts.

== Track listing ==
1. "Don't Stop the Music" 7:49 (Alisa Peoples, Lonnie Simmons, Jonah Ellis)
2. "Crazy" 3:54 (Peoples, Calvin Yarbrough)
3. "Third Degree" 4:54 (Ellis)
4. "Easy Tonight" 3:38 (Ellis)
5. "Want You Back Again" 4:15 (Vice, Yarbrough, Peoples)
6. "Come to Me" 4:36 (Yarbrough, Peoples, Simmons)
7. "You're My Song" 4:58 (Ellis, Simmons)
8. "Two of Us" 4:15 (Yarbrough, Peoples)
9. "I Believe I'm Falling in Love" 3:52 (Ellis)

== Personnel ==
- Cavin Yarbrough & Alisa Peoples - Keyboards, Synthesizer, Percussion, Lead and Backing Vocals
- Robert "Goodie" Whitfield, Temple McKinney - Keyboards, Backing Vocals
- Dionne "Flea" Oliver, Michael McKinney - Bass
- Victor "Widetrack" Hill - Bass, Backing Vocals
- Michael Wycoff, Patrick Moten - Keyboards
- J.P. "Sugarfoot" Moffett, Melvin Webb, Raymond Calhoun - Drums
- Butch Bonner, Jimmy Macon, Wes Blackman, Jonah Ellis - Guitar
- Loftin "Boots" Gray, Paulinho Da Costa - Percussion
- Benjamin Wright, Malvin "Dino" Vice - Horn & String Arrangements
- Jim Gilstrap, Julia Waters, Maxine Waters, Pat Peterson - Backing Vocals

== Production ==
- Produced By Lonnie Simmons & Jonah Ellis for Total Experience Productions, except "Want You Back Again" & "Come To Me"; produced by Lonnie Simmons & Malvin "Dino" Vice
- Horn and String Arrangements by Benjamin Wright and Malvin Dino Vice
- Recording & Mix Engineers: Steve McMillan, Michael Evans & Jack Rouben, except "Crazy" & "Third Degree"; mixed by Rick Gianatos & Bob Stone
- Remixes by Michael Evans & Steve McMillan
- Mastered by Bob Carbone
- All Songs Copyright Blackwell Publishing

== Charts ==
Chart (1981)	Peak position
Billboard Pop Albums	16
Billboard Top Soul Albums	1

=== Singles ===
Year	Single	Chart positions		
Year	Single	US Pop	US R&B	US Disco
1981	"Don't Stop The Music"	19	1	26
1981	"Third Degree"	-	74	-

== See also ==
- List of number-one R&B albums of 1981 (U.S.)
