= Franke Previte =

American musician and composer

- Born: May 2, 1946 (age 80)
- Occupation: Singer/Songwriter

Franke Jon Previte (born May 2, 1946) is an American singer, songwriter, and Academy Award-winning composer. He was the lead singer of the 1980s AOR rock band Franke and the Knockouts.

== Biography ==
Born and raised in New Brunswick, New Jersey to Franke Previte Sr. (an opera singer), Previte was the singer and songwriter of the New Jersey rock quintet Franke and the Knockouts, best known for their 1981 Top 10 hit "Sweetheart". He had previously performed with the Oxford Watch Band and Bull Angus.

Franke and the Knockouts were signed by Millennium Records in 1981 and had three U.S. Top 40 singles, as well as two Top 50 albums.

The band switched to MCA Records in 1984, and split up around 1986. Previte co-wrote music for the hit soundtrack for the 1987 movie Dirty Dancing, including "(I've Had) The Time of My Life," and Eric Carmen's hit "Hungry Eyes".

== Awards ==
- Academy Award for Best Achievement in Music; Best Song for 1987 for Dirty Dancing's "(I've Had) The Time of My Life" with co-composers John DeNicola and Donald Markowitz.

That same year Previte also received a Golden Globe and a Grammy nomination. "(I've Had) The Time of My Life" also won the ASCAP song of the year award. In 2014, the song was chosen as one of ASCAP's top 100 songs ever written, landing at number 15.

Previte was chosen as one of America's top 25 songwriters to represent the US in a songwriter summit in the USSR, which resulted in a release of an album called Music Speaks Louder Than Words in 1990.

== See also ==
- Dirty Dancing soundtrack
