= Somebody's Knockin' =

Single by Terri Gibbs

from the album Somebody's Knockin'
- B-side: "Some Days It Rains All Night Long"
- Released: October 1980
- Genre: Country, urban cowboy
- Length: 2:56
- Label: MCA Nashville
- Songwriter(s): Ed Penney, Jerry Gillespie
- Producer(s): Ed Penney

Terri Gibbs singles chronology
"Somebody's Knockin'" (1980)	"Rich Man" (1981)

Music video
- "Somebody's Knockin'" on YouTube

"Somebody's Knockin'" is a song recorded by American country music singer Terri Gibbs. It was released in October 1980 as her debut single and title track from her album Somebody's Knockin'. It was co-written by Jerry Gillespie and Ed Penney. Penney was a record company executive who liked Gibbs's voice when he first heard her audition tape, but felt she needed stronger material. Penney was a former Boston disc jockey who had promoted records and written a number of songs before moving to Nashville. He was the producer of "Somebody's Knockin'" and became Terri Gibbs's manager.

== Critical reception ==
An uncredited review in Billboard praised Gibbs' "unusual vocal sound" and the "Louisiana-flavored production".

The song's success led to Gibbs winning the 1981 Academy of Country Music Top Female Vocalist award, and the first Horizon (now New Artist) Award from the Country Music Association.

It was also nominated for a Grammy Award for Best Country Song.

== Chart performance ==
Chart (1980–1981)	Peak position
Australia (KMR)	52
Canadian RPM Top Singles	20
Canadian RPM Country Tracks	2
Canadian RPM Adult Contemporary	14
New Zealand (RIANZ)	14
U.S. Billboard Hot 100	13
U.S. Billboard Hot Country Singles	8
U.S. Billboard Adult Contemporary	3
U.S. Cash Box Top 100	10

Year-end chart (1981)	Rank
US Top Pop Singles (Billboard)	51

== See also ==
- List of 1980s one-hit wonders in the United States
