= Flash Harry (album) =

Studio album by Harry Nilsson
- Released: 1980
- Recorded: 1979
- Studio: Cherokee (Hollywood)
- Genre: Pop
- Length: 36:06
- Label: Mercury
- Producer: Steve Cropper

Harry Nilsson chronology
Early Tymes (1977)	Flash Harry (1980)	Popeye (1980)

Singles from Flash Harry
- 1. "I Don't Need You" / "It's So Easy" Released: September 1980; 2. "Rain" / "Bright Side of Life" Released: 17 October 1980

Professional ratings
Review scores
Source	Rating
AllMusic	3/5 stars
The Essential Rock Discography	4/10
Goldmine	C

Flash Harry is the fifteenth studio album by Harry Nilsson. Originally the album was not given a worldwide release and was issued only in the United Kingdom, Japan, Germany, France, Spain, The Netherlands, Australia, and Scandinavia. It was not issued in the United States until August 2013. Upon release it received little promotion from Mercury, with no proper single from the album.

The album features Nilsson's own recording of "Old Dirt Road", co-written and performed with John Lennon on Lennon's album Walls and Bridges (1974), Lennon's last album of original songs before his six-year hiatus.

Shortly after the release of this album, Nilsson retired from recording. Although he would subsequently reverse his decision and record various songs for film soundtracks in the 1980s and 1990s, he never issued another full album in his lifetime.

== Track listing ==
1. "Harry" (Eric Idle) – 2:22 (this track produced by Eric Idle, Trevor Jones, and Andre Jacquemin and sung by Eric Idle and Charlie Dore)
2. "Cheek to Cheek" (Lowell George, Van Dyke Parks, Martin Fydor Kibbee) – 2:30
3. "Best Move" (Nilsson, Parks, Michael Hazlewood) – 4:04
4. "Old Dirt Road" (Nilsson, John Lennon) – 4:26
5. "I Don't Need You" (Rick L. Christian) – 3:49
6. "Rain" (Nilsson) – 3:51
7. "I've Got It!" (Nilsson, Perry Botkin, Jr.) – 3:42
8. "It's So Easy" (Nilsson, Paul Stallworth) – 4:43
9. "How Long Can Disco On" (Nilsson, Ringo Starr) – 2:54
10. "Bright Side of Life" (Idle) – 4:12

== 2013 CD reissue bonus tracks ==
11. "Old Dirt Road" (Harry Nilsson, John Lennon) - 4:04 (Alternate version)
12. "Feet" (Danny Kortchmar) - 2:34 (Previously Unreleased)
13. "Leave The Rest to Molly" (Allen Toussaint) - 5:14 (Previously Unreleased)
14. "She Drifted Away" (John Lawrence Agostino) - 3:32 (Previously Unreleased)

== Personnel ==
- Keith Allison, Ben Benay, Lowell George, Danny Kortchmar, Fred Tackett – guitar
- Donald Dunn, Scott Edwards, Paul Stallworth, Klaus Voormann – bass guitar
- John Barlow Jarvis, Van Dyke Parks, Bill Payne – keyboards
- Dr. John – piano
- Jim Keltner, Rick Shlosser, Fred Staehle, Ringo Starr – drums
- Arthur Gerst – harp
- Bobby Keys, Jerome Jumonville, Jimmy Roberts, Wilton Felder – saxophone

Recorded at Cherokee Studios in Los Angeles, California, US.
