= Keep On Moving Straight Ahead =

Studio album by Lakeside
- Released: 1981
- Studio: Kendun Recorders (Burbank, California)
- Genre: Funk, soul
- Label: SOLAR (BXL1-3974)
- Producer: Lakeside

Lakeside chronology
Fantastic Voyage (1980)	Keep On Moving Straight Ahead (1981)	Your Wish Is My Command (1982)

Keep On Moving Straight Ahead is the fifth album by American funk band Lakeside. Released in 1981 on the SOLAR Records label, it contains songs left over from sessions for their previous albums that were recorded while SOLAR was distributed by RCA Records (SOLAR switched distribution from RCA to Elektra Records in 1981). RCA also released similar albums of left over tracks in 1981 for other artists on the SOLAR label.

The album entered the Billboard pop and R&B charts in 1981.

== Track listing ==
=== Side A ===
No.	Title	Writer(s)	Length
1.	"Keep On Moving Straight Ahead"	Stephen Shockley	4:39
2.	"It's You"	Otis Stokes	5:02
3.	"Be My Lady"	Stephen Shockley	6:13
4.	"It's Got to Be Love"	Mark Adam Wood, Jr.	3:51

=== Side B ===
No.	Title	Writer(s)	Length
1.	"We Want You (on the Floor)"	Fred Lewis	6:30
2.	"Back Together Again"	Otis Stokes	4:34
3.	"Anything for You"	Stephen Shockley	5:21
4.	"All for You"	Norman Beavers, Thomas Shelby, Tiemeyer McCain	3:49

== Personnel ==
Lakeside

- Tiemeyer McCain – lead vocals, backing vocals
- Thomas Shelby – lead vocals, backing vocals
- Mark Adam Wood, Jr. – lead vocals, backing vocals, keyboards
- Otis Stokes – lead vocals, backing vocals, keyboards, guitars, bass guitar
- Norman Beavers – keyboards
- Stephen Shockley – lead guitar, rhythm guitar
- Marvin Craig – bass guitar
- Fred Alexander, Jr. – drums, percussion
- Fred Lewis – percussion

Additional musicians

- David Crawford – string arrangements and conductor
- Janice Gower – string contractor

=== Production ===
- Dick Griffey – executive producer
- Lakeside – producers, arrangements, album concept
- Taavi Mote – recording, mixing
- Les Cooper – additional engineer
- Steve MacMillan – additional engineer
- Bob Winard – additional engineer
- Wally Traugott – mastering at Capitol Studios (Hollywood, California)
- Dina Andrews – production director
- Henry Vizcarra – art direction
- Warren Hile – illustration
- Jay Pope – dust sleeve photography
- Ron Slenzak – inner sleeve photography

== Chart performance ==
Chart (1981)	Peak position
U.S. Billboard Top LPs	109
U.S. Soul LPs	32
