= Fantastic Voyage (album) =

Studio album by Lakeside
- Released: 1980
- Recorded: 1980
- Studio: Larrabee (North Hollywood, California): Studio Masters (Los Angeles, California)
- Genre: Soul, funk
- Length: 38:23
- Label: SOLAR
- Producer: Lakeside

Lakeside chronology
Rough Riders (1979)	Fantastic Voyage (1980)	Keep On Moving Straight Ahead (1981)

Singles from Fantastic Voyage
- 1. "Fantastic Voyage" Released: January 1981; 2. "Your Love is on the One" Released: 1981

Fantastic Voyage is the fourth album by the funk band Lakeside, released in 1980 via SOLAR Records. It has been certified Gold in the US by the RIAA.

== Critical reception ==
Professional ratings
Review scores
Source	Rating
AllMusic	3/5 stars
The Virgin Encyclopedia of R&B and Soul	3/5 stars

Alex Henderson of AllMusic said, "Lakeside had one of R&B's most exciting live shows of the late '70s and early to mid-'80s, but in the studio, the Dayton, OH band generally didn't go that extra mile. Most of Lakeside's Solar albums were generally decent and had a few gems, but a consistently excellent studio album was something the group never achieved. The closest Lakeside came to a great studio session was Fantastic Voyage, arguably the band's best album."

== Track listing ==
1. "Fantastic Voyage" (Lakeside) - 6:10
2. "Your Love Is on the One" (Fred Alexander Jr., Stephen Shockley) - 6:20
3. "I Need You" (Otis Stokes) - 5:50
4. "Strung Out" (Thomas Shelby) - 5:07
5. "Say Yes" (Alexander Jr., Shockley) - 5:16
6. "Eveready Man" (Marvin Craig, Mark Adam Wood Jr.) - 4:37
7. "I Love Everything You Do" (Norman Beavers, Tiemeyer McCain) - 4:30
8. "Say Yes (Reprise)" - 0:29

== Personnel ==
Lakeside

- Tiemeyer McCain – lead vocals, backing vocals
- Thomas Shelby – lead vocals, backing vocals, percussion (1)
- Stephen Shockley – lead vocals, backing vocals, synthesizers, lead guitar, rhythm guitar, concert bells
- Otis Stokes – lead vocals, backing vocals, Wurlitzer electric piano, clavinet, ARP Quadra, guitars, bass guitar
- Norman Beavers – acoustic piano, Fender Rhodes, Wurlitzer electric piano, clavinet, ARP Odyssey, ARP Quadra
- Mark Adam Wood, Jr. – lead vocals, backing vocals, Fender Rhodes, Wurlitzer electric piano, percussion
- Fred Lewis – synth bass, congas, timbales, percussion, bass vocals (4)
- Marvin Craig – bass guitar, percussion
- Fred Alexander, Jr. – drums, percussion

Additional musicians

- Gene Dozier – string arrangements and conductor (3, 5, 7, 8)
- William Henderson – string contractor (3, 5, 7, 8)

Production

- Dick Griffey – executive producer
- Lakeside – producers, arrangements, mixing
- Steve Hodge – recording, mixing
- Bob Brown – additional engineer
- Barry Rudolph – additional engineer
- Wally Traugott – mastering at Capitol Studios (Hollywood, California)
- Dina Andrews – A&R coordinator
- Marge Meoli – A&R coordinator
- Henry Vizcarra – art direction
- Jeff Wack – illustration
- Ron Slenzak – photography

== Charts ==
=== Weekly charts ===
Chart (1981)	Peak position
US Billboard 200	16
US Top R&B/Hip-Hop Albums (Billboard)	2

=== Year-end charts ===
Chart (1981)	Position
US Billboard 200	50
US Top R&B/Hip-Hop Albums (Billboard)	9
