= Rough Riders (album) =

Studio album by Lakeside
- Released: 1979
- Recorded: 1979
- Genres: Soul, funk
- Label: SOLAR
- Producers: Dick Griffey, Lakeside, Leon Sylvers III

Lakeside chronology
| Shot of Love (1978) | Rough Riders (1979) | Fantastic Voyage (1980) |

Rough Riders is the third album by the American band Lakeside. Released in 1979 on the SOLAR Records label, it was produced by Dick Griffey, Lakeside, and Leon Sylvers III. "Pull My Strings" was a hit.

== Critical reception ==
Professional ratings
Review scores
| Source | Rating |
|---|---|
| AllMusic | 3/5 stars |
| The Virgin Encyclopedia of R&B and Soul | 3/5 stars |

The Oakland Post praised the "dynamic instrumentation, pinpoint rhythms and power funk chords layered with four-part harmonies dancing under strong, alternating lead vocals." The New York Times wrote that Rough Riders "displays a competent show band adept at several rhythm-and-blues idioms, but the material and arrangements are drearily formulaic."

== Track listing ==
1. "Rough Rider" (Stephen Shockley) - 4:45
2. "All in My Mind" (Otis Stokes, Stephen Shockley, Tiemeyer McCain) - 4:42
3. "If You Like Our Music (Get Up and Move)" (Otis Stokes, Stephen Shockley) - 4:33
4. "I Can't Get You Out of My Head" (Norman Beavers) - 5:36
5. "Pull My Strings" (Fred Lewis) - 6:54
6. "I'll Never Leave You" (Bryan Evans, Tiemeyer McCain) - 6:15
7. "From 9:00 Until" (Otis Stokes) - 6:04

== Personnel ==
- Backing vocals, bass, clavinet, guitar, lead vocals, piano (acoustic), synthesizer – Otis Stokes
- Backing vocals, bells, lead vocals – Tiemeyer McCain
- Backing vocals, electric piano (Fender Rhodes), lead vocals, piano (acoustic) – Mark Adam Wood, Jr.
- Backing vocals, lead vocals, vocals – Thomas Shelby
- Bass – Marvin Craig
- Clavinet, ensemble (string), keyboards, synthesizer – Norman Beavers
- Clavinet, guitar, synthesizer – Stephen Shockley
- Congas, percussion, synthesizer (bass), timbales – Fred Lewis
- Drums – Fred Alexander Jr.
