= Old Dirt Road =

Song by John Lennon

from the album Walls and Bridges
- Published: Lennon Music/ATV Music Ltd.
- Released: 26 September 1974 (US); 4 October 1974 (UK)
- Recorded: July–August 1974
- Genre: Rock
- Length: 4:11
- Label: Apple Records
- Songwriter: John Lennon/Harry Nilsson
- Producer: John Lennon

Walls and Bridges track listing
- 12 tracks Side one: 1. "Going Down on Love"; 2. "Whatever Gets You thru the Night"; 3. "Old Dirt Road"; 4. "What You Got"; 5. "Bless You"; 6. "Scared"; Side two: 7. "#9 Dream"; 8. "Surprise, Surprise (Sweet Bird of Paradox)"; 9. "Steel and Glass"; 10. "Beef Jerky"; 11. "Nobody Loves You (When You're Down and Out)"; 12. "Ya Ya"

"Old Dirt Road" is a song written by John Lennon and Harry Nilsson, first released on Lennon's 1974 album Walls and Bridges. Nilsson later recorded the song on his 1980 album Flash Harry.

== Lyrics & music ==
Lennon and Nilsson wrote "Old Dirt Road" while Lennon was working with Nilsson producing Nilsson's Pussy Cats album. Lennon had written the first verse, when he was interrupted by some business people, and asked Nilsson to provide an "Americanism." Nilsson provided a line, which Lennon incorporated into the song. Nilsson then continued writing part of the song.

"Old Dirt Road" uses the road as a metaphor for a point of stability in an unstable world and a life subject to variability. In the line originally provided by Nilsson, life is described as "trying to shovel smoke with a pitchfork in the wind." Even though the road is apparently stable, it too is at risk from the possibility of a mudslide. The singer advises the listener to just "keep on keepin' on." The lyrics incorporate a reference to Bob Nolan's song "Cool Water," where someone on the old dirt road suggests that the only thing needed is "cool, clear water." According to authors Ben Urish and Ken Bielen, the lyrics don't "make much literal sense but somehow sound right on an intuitive level." Music critic Johnny Rogan finds the mood of the song to be "stoical rather than despairing" and describes the lyrics as laissez-faire.

The song is in the form of a ballad, with some country music influence. Jesse Ed Davis' guitar contributes to the country atmosphere. Musically, it reproduces some of the sound from Lennon's Imagine album in employing dual pianos, one played by Lennon and one played by Nicky Hopkins. Urish and Bielen describe the music as "mournful and relaxed." John Blaney claims that it captures "an atmosphere of listless intoxication." Music journalist Paul du Noyer believes that Charlie Patton's "Ain't Goin' Down That Dirt Road" may have been an influence on the song.

== Critical reception ==
Lennon biographer Geoffery Giuliano describes "Old Dirt Road" as a "throwaway." AllMusic critic Richard Ginell does not rate the song highly either. However, AllMusic critic Stephen Thomas Erlewine describes it as "an enjoyable pop song." Johnny Rogan praises the "interesting imagery" of the lyrics, particularly the line about shovelling smoke.

Lennon himself dismissed the song as "just a song" and that he and Nilsson wrote it because they were drunk and had nothing better to do. However, music journalist Paul du Noyer believes that Lennon under-rated the song, as he did with several other songs of this period. Author John Blaney agrees with du Noyer, believing that Lennon under-rated the song because it was written during a difficult period in Lennon's life, when he was separated from Yoko Ono and doing a lot of drinking and consuming drugs with Nilsson.

== Other versions ==
A very early sketch of the song was included on Lennon's album Menlove Ave. and a more developed version, including acoustic guitar was included on John Lennon Anthology. The country music feel of the song is more pronounced on the Menlove Ave. version, as Jesse Ed Davis' guitar part is heard on its own. The Menlove Ave. version also makes more transparent the influence of chain gang songs on the "cool, clear water" line. The Anthology version differs from the Walls and Bridges version in the bridge and the ending, and also lacks the overdubs that were added to the Walls and Bridges version.

== Covers ==
Harry Nilsson, who co-wrote the lyrics with Lennon and performed on Lennon's version, also recorded his own version of the song for his 1980 album Flash Harry, on which Lennon's former bandmate Ringo Starr plays drums. According to AllMusic critic Richard Ginell, Nilsson's version is similar to Lennon's, albeit Nilsson sings it "in a somewhat strangled voice." Chip Madinger and Mark Easter agree that Nilsson's version is similar to Lennon's. SingersRoom critic Erica Henderson rated it as Nilsson's 7th best song, calling it "a heartfelt and introspective song that captures the essence of looking back on one’s past and the emotions that come with it."

== Personnel ==
The musicians who performed on the original recording were as follows:

- John Lennon – vocals, piano
- Harry Nilsson – backing vocals
- Nicky Hopkins – piano
- Jesse Ed Davis – electric guitar
- Ken Ascher – electric piano
- Klaus Voormann – bass
- Arthur Jenkins – percussion
- Jim Keltner – drums
