= Lakeside (album) =

Studio album by Lakeside
- Released: 1977
- Recorded: 1977
- Genre: Soul Funk
- Label: ABC Records
- Producer: Frank Wilson, Terri McFadden

Lakeside chronology
Lakeside (1977)	Shot of Love (1978)

Professional ratings
Review scores
Source	Rating
AllMusic	2/5 stars

Lakeside is the debut album by Lakeside. Released in 1977, it was produced by Frank Wilson and Terri McFadden.

== Track listing ==
1. "Shine on (Lift Your Spirit Higher)" (Beloyd Taylor, Peter Cor)
2. "Taboo" (Ernestine Madison)
3. "Miss Look But Don't Touch" (John Fox)
4. "I'll Be There Knocking" (Frank Wilson)
5. "Diamond Girl (Tell Me Why You're Crying)" (Frank Wilson)
6. "If I Didn't Have You" (Frank Wilson, John Footman)
7. "It's Not Only the Outside That Counts" (Frank Wilson, Ernestine Madison)
8. "Epilogue"

== Personnel ==
- Lakeside

=== Additional musicians ===
- James Jamerson, Nathan Watts - bass
- Frederick Lewis - congas
- Raymond Pounds - drums
- Billy Cooper, Greg Poree, Steve Beckmeier - guitar
- Bill King, Jerry Peters, John Barnes - keyboards
- Jack Ashford - percussion
- Jerry Peters, Sanford Shire - string arrangements and orchestrations
- Michael Boddicker - synthesizer
