= Terri Gibbs =

American country music artist (born 1954)

- Born: Teresa Fay Gibbs; June 15, 1954 (age 72); Miami, Florida, U.S.
- Origin: Grovetown, Georgia, U.S.
- Genres: Country, Christian
- Occupation: Singer
- Instruments: Vocals, keyboards
- Years active: 1980–present
- Labels: MCA, Warner Bros., Canaan, Morning Gate

Teresa Fay Gibbs (born June 15, 1954) is an American country music artist. Between 1980 and 2017, she recorded eleven studio albums, including four for MCA Records and one for Warner Bros. Records. She also charted 13 singles on the Billboard country singles charts in that timespan, including her debut single, "Somebody's Knockin'", which reached No. 8 on the country charts, No. 13 on the pop charts and No. 3 on the Adult Contemporary charts. She also entered the country top 20 with "Rich Man", "Mis'ry River", "Ashes to Ashes" and "Anybody Else's Heart but Mine." Gibbs has been blind since infancy.

== Early life ==
Gibbs was born in Miami, Florida, United States, but raised in the Augusta, Georgia, suburb of Grovetown. Although initially having eyesight, she had been born premature and subsequently lost her eyesight in an incubator accident. In her own words, "I was quite small (2 lbs., 11 ounces) and, so, they had to put me in an incubator. At that point in time, they did not know to cover the eyes and my retinas were damaged." At six months of age, Gibbs was diagnosed with retrolental fibroplasia and declared blind. She learned to play piano at age three. As a child, she sang in the church choir and at talent contests, and she opened for Bill Anderson at the age of 17. Her parents wanted her to be treated no differently from sighted people, so she was sent to public school and graduated from Butler High School in Augusta in 1972. She performed in and around the Augusta area and eventually, she met Chet Atkins, who advised her to move to Nashville, Tennessee, to pursue a country music career, which she did at age eighteen. After failing to find a record deal, she moved to Miami and joined a band called Sound Dimension. She continued to perform locally, later forming a band called the Terri Gibbs Trio, which performed at a Steak and Ale in Augusta, Georgia. Gibbs then sent a demo tape to record producer Ed Penney of MCA Records, signing to the label in 1980. Penney was a former Boston disc jockey and a long-time songwriter. He liked her voice on her demo, but he felt she needed stronger material. He co-wrote "Somebody's Knockin'" for her and also produced the song.

== Musical career ==
Gibbs' first single release was "Somebody's Knockin'", which was also the title of her 1981 debut album. This song was a crossover hit upon its 1980 release, reaching No. 8 on the U.S. country charts, No. 13 on the Billboard Hot 100 and No. 3 on the Adult Contemporary charts. It was followed by "Rich Man", a No. 19 country hit which also entered the pop charts. Her debut album won her the Academy of Country Music's Top New Female Vocalist award. She was also the first winner of the Country Music Association's Horizon Award (which is awarded to emerging artists), and was nominated for a Grammy Award for Best Country Song and Best Female Country Vocal Performance for "Somebody's Knockin'." Gibbs performed on the Grand Ole Opry as well.

MCA released her second album, I'm a Lady, later in 1981. This album was less successful, although it produced a No. 12 hit in "Mis'ry River," its second and final single. 1982's Some Days It Rains All Night Long produced a Top 20 hit in "Ashes to Ashes" and a No. 45 in its title track. Also in 1981 and 1982, Gibbs toured with George Jones and sang duets with him onstage. Her final MCA album, Over Easy, also produced a minor hit in "Anybody Else's Heart but Mine", and after releasing a compilation called The Best of Terri Gibbs, she left the label.

Gibbs switched to Warner Bros. Records for her fifth album, 1985's Old Friends. All three of this album's singles — "A Few Good Men" (which featured Kathy Mattea on backing vocals) "Rockin' in a Brand New Cradle" and "Someone Must Be Missing You Tonight" — missed the country Top 40.

Gibbs later shifted her focus to Contemporary Christian music, recording Turn Around and Comfort the People in 1987 and 1988, respectively, on Canaan Records. The former gave Gibbs her second Grammy nomination. What a Great Day, her third Christian album, followed in 1990 on the Morning Gate label. In 2002, Terri released the album, No Doubt About It, followed by the 2010 release of Your Grace Still Amazes Me. In 2014, The Best Of Terri Gibbs, featuring 10 of her best loved Country hits. In June 2017, Terri released her sixth Christian album, Sum It All Up.

== Personal life ==
Gibbs married Grovetown, Georgia, city councilman David Daughtry on April 28, 1988, and remained married to him until his death in February 2008. They had one son, David Wayne Daughtry II, born October 20, 1989.

== Awards and honors ==
Gibbs has won several industry awards. She won Academy of Country Music's Best New Female Vocalist and the Country Music Association's inaugural Horizon Award (for artists rising to new levels of prominence).

== Discography ==
=== Albums ===
Year	Title	Chart Positions		Label
Year		US Country	US	Label
1981	Somebody's Knockin	8	53	MCA
1981	I'm a Lady	40	—	MCA
1982	Some Days It Rains All Night Long	33	—	MCA
1983	Over Easy	32	—	MCA
1985	The Best of Terri Gibbs	—	—	MCA
1985	Old Friends	58	—	Warner Bros.
1987	Turn Around	—	—	Canaan
1988	Comfort the People	—	—	Canaan
1990	What a Great Day	—	—	Morning Gate
2002	No Doubt About It	—	—	TGM
2010	Your Grace Still Amazes Me	—	—	TGM
2014	The Best Of Terri Gibbs	—	—	TGM
2017	Sum It All Up	—	—	TGM

=== Singles ===
Year	Title	Chart Positions						Album
Year	Title	US Country	US	US AC	CAN Country	CAN	CAN AC	Album
1980	"Somebody's Knockin'"	8	13	3	2	20	14	Somebody's Knockin'
1981	"Rich Man"	19	89	37	29	—	—	Somebody's Knockin'
1981	"I Wanna Be Around"	38	—	—	—	—	—	I'm a Lady
1981	"Mis'ry River"	12	—	—	7	—	—	I'm a Lady
1982	"Ashes to Ashes"	19	—	—	19	—	—	Some Days It Rains All Night Long
1982	"Some Days It Rains All Night Long"	45	—	—	—	—	—	Some Days It Rains All Night Long
1983	"Baby I'm Gone"	33	—	—	29	—	—	Some Days It Rains All Night Long
1983	"Anybody Else's Heart but Mine"	17	—	—	17	—	—	Over Easy
1983	"Tell Mama"	65	—	—	28	—	—	Over Easy
1985	"A Few Good Men"	43	—	—	41	—	—	Old Friends
1985	"Rockin' in a Brand New Cradle"	70	—	—	53	—	—	Old Friends
1985	"Someone Must Be Missing You Tonight"	70	—	—	—	—	—	Old Friends
1987	"Turn Around"	87	—	—	—	—	—	Turn Around
1991	"One to Grow On"	—	—	—	—	—	—	What a Great Day
