= Don't Waste Your Time (Yarbrough & Peoples song) =

Song by Yarbrough & Peoples
- Released: March 1984
- Recorded: 1983
- Genre: Funk
- Length: 3:39
- Label: Total Experience
- Songwriter: Jonah Ellis

"Don't Waste Your Time" is a 1984 single by Yarbrough & Peoples. The song was written and produced by Jonah Ellis and was the duo's second number one on the R&B chart and also charted on the Hot 100 peaking at number forty-eight.
