= Breakdown (Paulinho da Costa album) =

Studio album by Paulinho da Costa
- Released: 1991
- Studio: Ocean Way Recording (Hollywood, California); Wild Tracks (North Hollywood, California)
- Genre: Fusion; Funk; Soul
- Length: 37:25
- Label: A&M
- Producer: Paulinho da Costa; Erich Bulling

Breakdown is the fourth solo album by Brazilian percussionist Paulinho da Costa released in 1991, recorded for A&M Records.

AllMusic remarked about the album, "Exacting, demanding rhythms are obscured by generic arrangements and playing."

== Track listing ==
Breakdown track listing
No.	Title	Length
1.	"Say It Now, 'Freedom'"	6:07
2.	"One Step Two Step"	3:42
3.	"Guaruja"	4:58
4.	"I Believe You"	4:04
5.	"Sabor Latino"	4:01
6.	"Let's Stay Friends"	5:09
7.	"No Way Out"	4:06
8.	"This Love's For Keeps"	3:49
9.	"Real Love" (featuring Marsha Skidmore on vocals)	4:05
10.	"You Can Love Me"	3:44
11.	"Going North"	3:24
12.	"Exotica"	5:00
Total length:		52:09

== Personnel ==
Musicians

- Paulinho da Costa – drums, percussion
- Erich Bulling – keyboards
- George Duke – keyboard solo (2)
- Paul Jackson, Jr. – guitars (2, 4, 9)
- Carlos Rios – guitars (6)
- Duilio Cosenza – cavaquinho (12)
- Nathan East – bass (4)
- Marcus Miller – bass (5, 7, 9)
- Andy Narell – steel drums (3)
- Larry Williams – tenor saxophone (1, 5, 7, 8)
- Gerald Albright – soprano saxophone (9)
- Rick Culver – trombone (5, 8)
- Bill Reichenbach Jr. – trombone (5, 8)
- Gary Grant – trumpet (5, 8)
- Jerry Hey – trumpet (5, 8)
- Herb Alpert – trumpet (6, 7)

Vocalists

- Philip Bailey – backing vocals (1)
- Peter Canada – lead vocals (1, 3, 6, 7, 12), backing vocals (7, 12)
- Darryl Phinnessee – lead vocals (1, 10, 11), backing vocals (11)
- Jimmy Varner – lead vocals (1, 8), backing vocals (1, 8)
- Julia Waters – backing vocals (1, 8)
- Luther Waters – backing vocals (1, 8)
- Maxine Waters – backing vocals (1, 8)
- Oren Waters – backing vocals (1, 8)
- Marsha Skidmore – lead vocals (2, 4, 9), backing vocals (6, 12)
- Maria Del Rey – backing vocals (2, 3, 5, 10)
- Isela Sotelo – backing vocals (2, 3, 5, 10)
- Kenny O'Brien – lead vocals (5), backing vocals (5, 6, 12)
- Erich Bulling – backing vocals (7, 12)
- Myrian Rios – lead vocals (10)
- Paulo da Costa - backing vocals (11)

== Production ==
- Paulinho da Costa – producer, arrangements
- Erich Bulling – producer, arrangements, engineer
- Eric Rudd – engineer
- Steve Sykes – engineer, mixing
- Csaba Petocz – mixing
- Bryant Arnett – assistant engineer
- Bernie Grundman – mastering at Bernie Grundman Mastering (Hollywood, California)
- Chuck Beeson – art direction, design
- Rowan Moore – art direction, design
- Bret Lopez – photography
- Mimi De Blasio – stylist
