= I Don't Need You =

1981 single by Kenny Rogers

Single by Kenny Rogers

from the album Share Your Love
- B-side: "Without You in My Life"
- Released: June 15, 1981
- Genre: Country pop
- Length: 3:27
- Label: Liberty
- Songwriter: Rick Christian
- Producer: Lionel Richie

Kenny Rogers singles chronology
"Lady" (1980)	"I Don't Need You" (1981)	"Share Your Love with Me" (1981)

"I Don't Need You" is a song written by Rick Christian, and was first recorded and released as a single in 1978 on Mercury Records, by Rick Christian himself at Shoe Productions, a recording studio/production company in Memphis, Tennessee, but it failed to chart.

== Kenny Rogers recording ==
It was released in June 1981 as the lead single from Rogers' album Share Your Love. American country music artist Kenny Rogers had collaborated with R&B/pop singer-songwriter Lionel Richie in 1980 with the song "Lady". After the success of that record, Rogers asked Richie to produce his next album, Share Your Love. Although the original plan was for Richie to write all the songs for Rogers' forthcoming album, the two men agreed to accept songs they both liked for the project which had been written by others. "I Don't Need You", written by Rick Christian, was one of those songs. Rogers has been quoted describing "I Don't Need You" as "...still to this day one of my favorite songs", although he admitted that "I don't think I ever met Rick Christian, the guy who wrote it."

== Charts ==
Selected as the lead single, "I Don't Need You" spent two weeks at number 3 on the Billboard Hot 100 chart in August 1981. The song also rose to number 1 on two other Billboard music charts, the country chart as well as the adult contemporary chart. It remained atop the latter chart for six weeks in July and August of that year.

Chart (1981)	Peak position
Australia (Kent Music Report)	64
US Hot Country Songs (Billboard)	1
US Billboard Hot 100	3
US Adult Contemporary (Billboard)	1
Canadian RPM Country Tracks	1
Canadian RPM Top Singles	2
Canadian RPM Adult Contemporary Tracks	2

Year-end chart (1981)	Rank
US Top Pop Singles (Billboard)	44

== Other recordings ==
- Harry Nilsson, recorded in 1979 and released on his album Flash Harry in 1980 (United Artists/Mercury, 1980).
- The Carpenters, recorded in 1980 but never released.
- Madeleine Marks recorded it for her self-titled album, (RCA), in early 1981.
- The Kalapana Awa Band released a recording of this song in 2024
