= Franke and the Knockouts =

American pop rock band

- Origin: New Brunswick, New Jersey, United States
- Genres: Pop rock, soft rock
- Years active: 1980–1986
- Labels: Millennium, MCA
- Past members: Franke Previte; Billy Elworthy; Leigh Foxx; Claude LeHenaff; Blake Levinsohn; Tommy Ayers; Tico Torres; Bobby Messano

Franke and the Knockouts was an American pop rock band, formed in New Brunswick, New Jersey, United States, and fronted by singer/songwriter Franke Previte.

== History ==
Franke and the Knockouts formed in 1980, with the original line-up including Previte as frontman, Billy Elworthy on guitar, Blake Levinsohn on keyboards, Leigh Foxx on bass, and Claude LeHenaff on drums.

Signed by Millennium Records, this line-up released their self-titled debut album in 1981, scoring a top ten hit with "Sweetheart", co-written by Previte and Elworthy. This single would be the group's biggest hit, peaking at number 10 in the U.S. in June 1981. Another single, "You're My Girl", also cracked the top 30. Keyboardist Tommy Ayers, who had played a key role performing on the debut album, became an official member of the band soon thereafter, expanding the line-up to six. The group toured and appeared on shows such as Fridays and American Bandstand.

As they were looking ahead to record a follow-up album in 1982, drummer Claude LeHenaff parted ways with the band, apparently at the behest of the record company. Continuing on as a quintet once again, the group recorded their second album, Below the Belt, with Detroit-based session drummer Al Wotton, who had previously performed on albums by Mark Farner and Rachel Sweet. Shortly after the album's release later in 1982, future Bon Jovi drummer Tico Torres came on board to officially fill LeHenaff's spot on the kit. Meanwhile, Below the Belt featured the top-25 hit "Without You (Not Another Lonely Night)", but was not as commercially successful as the debut album.

After Millennium folded, the band switched to MCA Records in 1984. Band membership shifted considerably throughout recording sessions for the group's third album. The lone album Franke and the Knockouts would release with MCA, Makin' the Point, appeared later in 1984, failing to match the success of their previous work. The group disbanded in 1986, having achieved three top 40 U.S. singles and two top 50 albums.

Several years before the breakup, the group also wrote and recorded the original versions of Eric Carmen's 1987 hit single "Hungry Eyes" and the song "(I've Had) The Time of My Life" (both of which were featured in the 1987 film Dirty Dancing). This material earned Previte an Academy Award for Best Original Song. Franke and the Knockouts' original version of "Hungry Eyes" was later featured as a bonus track on the 1998 re-release of the Makin' the Point album, and was also included, along with the original version of "(I've Had) The Time of My Life", on the band's compilation album The Sweetheart Collection.

== Members ==
Former

- Franke Previte – lead vocals (1980–1986)
- Billy Elworthy – lead and rhythm guitars (1980–1984)
- Leigh Foxx – bass (1980–1986)
- Claude LeHenaff – drums (1980–1982)
- Blake Levinsohn – keyboards (1980–1984)
- Tommy Ayers – keyboards, backing vocals (1981–1986)
- Tico Torres – drums (1982–1983; still listed as band's drummer on 1984 album release)
- Bobby Messano – lead & rhythm guitars, backing vocals (1982–1984)

Session musicians

- Charlie Dominici – backing vocals (Franke and the Knockouts)
- Al Wotton – drums (Below the Belt)
- John DeNicola – bass (Makin' the Point)

== Discography ==
=== Albums ===
Studio

- 1981: Franke and the Knockouts (No. 31)
- 1982: Below the Belt (No. 48)
- 1984: Makin' the Point

Compilation

- 1999: The Sweetheart Collection
- 2018: The Complete Collection (3-CD reissue of all three albums plus demos and live tracks)
- 2026: The Hits

=== Singles ===
Year	Song	US BB	US CB	US Mainstream	AUS	Canada RPM
1981	"Sweetheart"	10	13	27	63	18
1981	"Come Back"	—	—	45	—	—
1981	"You're My Girl"	27	29	—	—	—
1982	"Never Had It Better"	—	—	37	—	—
1982	"Without You (Not Another Lonely Night)"	24	22	—	—	45
1984	"Outrageous"	—	—	—	—	—

== See also ==
- Dirty Dancing soundtrack
