= Sweetheart (Franke and the Knockouts song) =

Single by Franke and the Knockouts

from the album Franke & the Knockouts
- B-side: "Don't Stop"
- Released: March 1981
- Genre: Soft rock
- Length: 4:11
- Label: Millennium
- Songwriters: Franke Previte, William Elworthy
- Producer: Steve Verroca

Franke and the Knockouts singles chronology
"Sweetheart" (1981)	"You're My Girl" (1981)

"Sweetheart" is the debut single by Franke and the Knockouts. It is their greatest hit, reaching the U.S. top 10 during the spring of 1981. The song is from their self-titled debut album, also released that year.

== Background ==
The song was the group's first of three U.S. top 40 hits, the others being "You're My Girl" (#27) and "Without You (Not Another Lonely Night)" (#24).

== Chart history ==
It spent 19 weeks on the charts and is ranked as the 50th biggest hit of 1981. "Sweetheart" also charted moderately on both the U.S. Adult Contemporary and Mainstream Rock charts. Internationally, "Sweetheart" charted in Canada at No. 18 and in Australia at No. 63.

=== Weekly charts ===
Chart (1981)	Peak position
Australia Kent Music Report	63
Canada RPM Top Singles	18
US Billboard Hot 100	10
US Billboard Adult Contemporary	40
US Billboard Top Rock Tracks	27
US Cash Box Top 100	13

=== Year-end charts ===
Chart (1981)	Rank
U.S. Billboard Hot 100	50
