= Fantastic Voyage (Lakeside song) =

- One of side-A labels of the US 12-inch single

Single by Lakeside

from the album Fantastic Voyage
- B-side: "I Can't Get You Out of My Head"
- Released: January 1981
- Recorded: 1980
- Genre: Funk; R&B; disco
- Length: 6:10
- Label: SOLAR (JD-12130)
- Songwriter: Lakeside

Lakeside singles chronology
"From 9:00 Until" (1980)	"Fantastic Voyage" (1981)	"Your Love Is on the One" (1981)

"Fantastic Voyage" is a 1980 song by Lakeside, a band from Dayton, Ohio. It was the number one hit single from their 1980 album of the same name. The song hit number one on the R&B chart and was the group's only entry on the Billboard Hot 100, where it peaked at number fifty-five.

== Samples ==
- In 1994, hip-hop artist Coolio sampled the Lakeside song for his own hit of the same title.

== Song in popular culture ==
- The song was performed by Cedric the Entertainer, Vanessa Williams, Bow Wow and Solange Knowles during a talent show in the movie Johnson Family Vacation.
- The song also appeared in the movie First Kid, starring Sinbad.
- The song is also played in 2004 video game Grand Theft Auto: San Andreas, on the in-game radio station, Bounce FM.
- The song was used in the Borderlands: The Pre-Sequel's Claptastic Voyage DLC trailer.
- The song was used in a television commercial in 2021 for Allstate Insurance.
