= Happy People (Paulinho da Costa album) =

Studio album by Paulinho da Costa
- Released: 1979
- Genre: Jazz; Latin; Funk; Soul
- Length: 37:25
- Label: Pablo Today
- Producer: Paulinho da Costa

Professional ratings
Review scores
Source	Rating
Allmusic	4/5 stars

Happy People is the second solo album by Brazilian percussionist Paulinho Da Costa released in 1979, recorded for Pablo Records.

== Track listing ==
1. "Déjà Vu" (John Barnes, Vella Cameron) – 4:32
2. "Take It On Up" (Kevin Barnes, Louis Satterfield, Robert Wright, Verdine White) – 3:12
3. "Love Till The End Of Time" (Greg Phillinganes) – 3:27
4. "Seeing Is Believing" (John Barnes, Vella Cameron) – 3:58
5. "Dreamflow" (Larry Carlton) – 3:45
6. "Carnival Of Colors" (Ivan Lins, Vítor Martins) – 3:28
7. "Let's Get Together" (Marlo Henderson, Paulinho Da Costa) – 5:41
8. "Happy People" (Erich Bulling, Paulinho Da Costa) – 4:08
9. "Put Your Mind On Vacation" (Deborah Thomas, Greg Mathieson) – 5:14

== Personnel ==
- Paulinho Da Costa - percussion
- John Barnes, Greg Phillinganes - keyboards
- Nathan Watts - bass
- Al McKay, Larry Carlton, Marlo Henderson - guitars
- Michael Boddicker - synthesizers
- James Gadson - drums
- Bill Reichenbach Jr., Eric Culver, Tom "Bones" Malone, Lew McCreary, Dick Hyde - trombones
- Chuck Findley, Gary Grant, Steve Madaio – trumpets, flugelhorns
- Gary Herbig - saxophone, flute, oboe
- Philip Bailey (1), Deborah Thomas (6, 9), Bill Champlin (2, 4), Carl Carwell (7) - lead vocals
- Bill Champlin, Carl Carwell, Carmen Twillie, Clarence Ford Jr., Deborah Thomas, Jeanette Hawes, Philip Bailey, Vennette Cloud - backing vocals

== Production ==
- Paulinho Da Costa - Producer
- Erich Bulling, John Barnes, Bruce Miller - Arrangements
- Humberto Gatica - Engineer and Mix
- Chris Desmond - Engineer (additional)
- Bernie Grundman - Mastering
- Blue Johnson - Photography
- Norman Granz, Sheldon Marks Artwork B - Layout and Design
