= Lakeside (band) =

American band

- Origin: Dayton, Ohio, U.S.
- Genre: Funk
- Years active: 1969–present
- Labels: Solar, ABC

Lakeside is an American funk band, best known for their 1980 number one R&B hit "Fantastic Voyage".

== Band history ==
=== Formation and early years ===
In 1969, guitarist Stephen Shockley from Dayton, Ohio formed a group named the Young Underground after he had departed a group known as the Monterreys. Vocalist Mark Woods, who was a member of another local band called the Nomads, joined up with Shockley's band. In 1971, the Nomads and the Young Underground took on a new, singular identity: with the addition of Thomas Shelby and Mark Wood's sister Shirley Wood, they became Ohio Lakeside Express.

In 1971, the group became acquainted with Eddie Thomas of Curtom, a record label owned and operated by Mr. Thomas and his partner Curtis Mayfield. Eddie Thomas left Curtom to form his own label, "Lakeside", which he named after the south-side of Chicago. Lakeside (the record label) signed Ohio Lakeside Express. Eddie Thomas had a number of producers expressing interest in producing an album for Lakeside, but nothing materialized at this stage in their career. That would soon change, as Shirley chose not to pursue her singing career, so they added Ricky Abernathy as a new singer.

At Mavericks Flats, another of the big-time venues of the day, by now they added another vocalist (Otis Stokes) to replace Ricky Abernathy, and a new percussionist (Fred Lewis). The group was seen by Dick Griffey, a promoter handling successful artists like Stevie Wonder. Impressed by the group, he offered his friendship and advice, and began informally managing Lakeside in early 1975. It was also in 1974 that Lakeside met Frank Wilson and signed a deal with Motown. Motown was promoting and prioritizing other groups, and shelved what they had produced for Lakeside.

When Frank Wilson left Motown in 1976 for ABC Dunhill, he formed his own production company named Spec-O-Lite Productions and signed Lakeside after convincing them to drop the "Ohio" and "Express".

In 1977, Lakeside's success began to accelerate. That year, the group released their eponymous debut album, which featured the single "If I Didn't Have You". About this time, the group debuted on Soul Train, performing a Beloyd Taylor and Peter Cor composition "Shine On", which helped pave the way for future success. As Lakeside added barefoot drummer Fred Alexander, Jr., the band was approached by Whitfield Records, Motown, and Solar Records. Lakeside chose Solar Records, owned by Dick Griffey, with stablemates The Whispers, Shalamar, Midnight Star, Klymaxx, and Carrie Lucas.

=== Major label success ===
Dick Griffey, the producer who had befriended and managed Lakeside since 1975, started Solar Records in 1978. At that same time, Norman Whitfield had been courting the group to sign with his Whitfield Records, but Griffey offered the group a chance to write and co-produce their own music, which Whitfield was not willing to do.

Parting amicably with Frank Wilson, Lakeside became a part of the Solar family. The band released the album Shot of Love in 1978. Their first Solar album featured songs all written by members of the band and co-produced with Solar staff producer Leon Sylvers III. With this album, the band began to find major success on the R&B charts when the single "It's All the Way Live" reached number 4.

The band, at this point consisting of bassist Marvin Craig, drummer Fred Alexander, percussionist Fred Lewis, guitarist Steve Shockley, keyboardist Norman Beavers, guitarist/multi-instrumentalist and lead vocalist Otis Stokes, lead vocalist/keyboardist Mark Wood, occasional lead vocalists Tiemeyer McCain and Thomas Shelby found their niche with a sound that stemmed from years of playing together. The band dressed in a range of costumes on their album covers, including pirates, 1920s police officers, cowboys, Arabian knights, and even Robin Hood.

Despite the success of Shot of Love and "It's All the Way Live", the album Rough Riders did not fare as well. However, the following album, 1980's Fantastic Voyage, exceeded all expectations. Its single "Fantastic Voyage" reached number one on the R&B chart. The tune remains the band's biggest hit, also hitting the pop charts (their only single to do so), where it peaked at number 55. Fantastic Voyage was certified Gold and remains the group's greatest achievement, and it eventually went Platinum. They followed up this hit with a remake of the Beatles' song "I Want to Hold Your Hand", which made the R&B top 10 again.

Subsequent to Fantastic Voyage, Lakeside released six more successful albums. More hits on the R&B charts, such as "Raid" (1983) and "Outrageous" (1984), kept the group going until their change in the late 1980s. "Bullseye" (1987) became the group's last major hit as new jack swing began taking over the airwaves.

Tyrone Griffin, one of the later members of Lakeside, has a son in the music industry, Tyrone Griffin, Jr., known to the public as singer Ty Dolla Sign.

=== Later history ===
The Rose Music Center in Huber Heights held a benefit concert on September 18, 2019 that raised more than $109,000 to help survivors of the Memorial Day tornado. Performers included the Ohio Players, Zapp, Steve Arrington, and the Original Lakeside.

Fred Alexander died on June 11, 2026.

== Band membership ==
=== "Classic" line-up ===
- Mark Adam Wood, Jr.: lead vocals, piano? 1969–2015
- Tiemeyer McCain: vocals; 1969–1986
- Thomas Shelby: vocals; 1970–1983, 2007–present
- Stephen Shockley: lead guitar; 1969–present
- Norman Beavers: keyboards; 1969–1987, ????–present
- Marvin Craig: bass guitar; 1973–present
- Fred Lewis: percussion; 1974–???? (d. 2023)
- Otis Stokes: guitars, bass, lead vocals; 1975–1986, ????–present
- Fred Alexander, Jr: drums; 1977–2026 (d. 2026)

=== Other members ===
- Brian Marbury: 1969–1970 (d. 2009)
- Tony White: 1969–1970
- Vincent Beavers: 1969–1975
- Terry Williams: 1969–1975
- Ricky Abernathy: 1969–1975
- Shirley Wood: 1970–1971
- Johnny Rogers: ????–present
- Will Shelby: 1993–2021 (d. 2021)
- Donald Tavie: 1985–2011 (d. 2011)
- Barrington Henderson: 1986–1995
- Larry Bolden: 1989–??? (d. 2025)
- Floyd Bailey: 1975–1977
- Tyrone Griffin, Sr: 1983–1997
- Dale E. Wilson, Sr: 1969–1977
- Roc Phizzle: 2018–present
- Ladell Yates: 2016–present

== Discography ==
=== Albums ===
Year	Title	Chart positions		Certifications	Record Label
Year	Title	US	US R&B	Certifications	Record Label
1977	Lakeside	105	28		ABC Records
1978	Shot of Love	74	10		Solar Records
1979	Rough Riders	141	21		Solar Records
1980	Fantastic Voyage	16	2	US: Gold	Solar Records
1981	Keep on Moving Straight Ahead	109	32		Solar Records
1982	Your Wish Is My Command	58	9		Solar Records
1983	Untouchables	42	10		Solar Records
1984	Outrageous	68	11		Solar Records
1987	Power	—	35		Solar Records
1990	Party Patrol	—	—		Solar Records

=== Singles ===
Year	Title	Chart positions			Album
Year	Title	US	US R&B	US Dance	Album
1978	"It's All the Way Live (Part 1)"	102	4	—	Shot of Love
1979	"Given in to Love"	—	73	—	Shot of Love
1979	"Pull My Strings"	—	31	—	Rough Riders
1980	"From 9:00 Until"	—	44	73	Rough Riders
1980	"Fantastic Voyage"	55	1	12	Fantastic Voyage
1981	"Your Love Is on the One"	—	14	—	Fantastic Voyage
1981	"We Want You (On the Floor)"	—	44	—	Keep on Moving Straight Ahead
1982	"I Want to Hold Your Hand"	102	5	—	Your Wish Is My Command
1982	"Something About That Woman"	110	25	—	Your Wish Is My Command
1983	"Raid"	—	8	—	Untouchables
1983	"Turn the Music Up"	—	38	—	Untouchables
1983	"Real Love"	—	17	—	Untouchables
1984	"Outrageous"	101	7	42	Outrageous
1984	"Make My Day"	—	37	—	Outrageous
1987	"Relationship"	—	24	—	Power
1987	"Bullseye"	—	33	—	Power
1990	"Money"	—	62	—	Party Patrol
"—" denotes releases that did not chart or were not released in that territory.
