= What Cha' Gonna Do for Me (song) =

Song written by Hamish Stuart and Ned Doheny

- Side A of the US single

Single by Chaka Khan

from the album What Cha' Gonna Do for Me
- B-side: "Lover's Touch"
- Released: May 1981
- Recorded: 1980–81
- Genre: Synth-funk
- Length: 3:54
- Label: Warner Bros.
- Songwriters: Ned Doheny; Hamish Stuart

Chaka Khan singles chronology
"Get Ready, Get Set" (1980)	"What Cha' Gonna Do for Me" (1981)	"We Can Work It Out" (1981)

"What Cha' Gonna Do For Me" is the title track of Chaka Khan's third solo album from 1981. The song was written by Ned Doheny and Hamish Stuart of the Average White Band. They had recorded the song a year earlier and released it on their LP Shine.

The song was the second of four number-one singles on the R&B chart for Khan and was at the top spot for two weeks. The single was also her second entry on the Billboard Hot 100, reaching number 53. On the Cash Box Top 100, "What Cha' Gonna Do For Me" reached number 49.

In New Zealand, the song peaked at number 21.

== Chart performance ==
=== Weekly charts ===
Chart (1981)	Peak position
New Zealand	21
U.S. Billboard Hot 100	53
U.S. Billboard R&B	1
U.S. Billboard Dance	22
U.S. Cash Box Top 100	49

=== Year-end charts ===
Chart (1981)	Rank
U.S. Billboard R&B	14

== Unreleased demo version ==
"What Cha' Gonna Do for Me"

Demo by Ned Doheny and Average White Band
- A-side: "Get It Up For Love"
- Released: April 19, 2014
- Recorded: 1980
- Genre: Soul, funk, soft rock
- Length: 4:04
- Label: The Numero Group
- Songwriters: Ned Doheny; Hamish Stuart

Ned Doheny and Average White Band singles chronology
"Perish The Thought" (1991)	"What Cha' Gonna Do for Me" (2014)	"Labor Of Love (Kenny Dickenson Remix)" (2017)

A demo version of the song by Doheny was released by The Numero Group on April 19, 2014, alongside a reissue of "Get It Up For Love", due to Doheny's popularity in Japan. The demo was recorded in 1980 and was previously unreleased, with the Average White Band as the backing band.
