= Don't Stop the Music (Yarbrough and Peoples song) =

- Side A of the US 7-inch single

Single by Yarbrough and Peoples

from the album The Two of Us
- B-side: "You're My Song"
- Released: December 19, 1980 (UK)
- Recorded: 1980
- Genre: R&B, boogie
- Length: 7:49; 4:08 (7")
- Label: Mercury
- Songwriters: Jonah Ellis; Alisa Peoples; Lonnie Simmons
- Producers: Jonah Ellis; Lonnie Simmons

Yarbrough and Peoples singles chronology
"Don't Stop the Music" (1980)	"Don't Waste Your Time" (1984)

Official audio
- "Don't Stop the Music " on YouTube

"Don't Stop the Music" is a song by Yarbrough and Peoples, from the duo's 1980 debut album, The Two of Us. It was released as their debut single on Mercury Records in 1980.

== Chart performance ==
The song reached number 26 on the dance charts, number 19 on the Billboard Hot 100, and fared even better on the US R&B chart, where it hit number one, Outside the US, "Don't Stop the Music" went to number 7 in the UK. The song's success helped to earn a gold record for the duo. Radio promotion for the record was handled in Los Angeles by independent marketing firm Dudley-Gorov, while a young Russell Simmons shopped the record to New York club DJs as one of his early jobs.

== Chart history ==
Chart (1981)	Peak position
Australia (Kent Music Report)	73
Belgium (Ultratop 50 Flanders)	4
Canada RPM Top Singles	40
Ireland (IRMA)	18
Netherlands	2
UK Singles Chart	7
US Billboard Hot 100	19
US R&B Singles	1
Dance/Club Play Singles	26
US Cash Box Top 100	17

== Music video ==
The music video for the song featured hand puppets singing "You don't really wanna stop? No!" The duo also used them for many of their live performances.

== Samples and covers ==
"Don't Stop the Music" has been heavily sampled by other artists, primarily in the hip hop genre, on songs including "Tops Drop" by Fat Pat, "Can't Stop the Southland" by Brownside, "Gangsta Lovin'" by Eve, "All Night Long" by Common, "Let It Go" by Keyshia Cole, "Don't Stop What You Doing" by Diddy off his debut album No Way Out, "Crazy in Love" (Rockwilder Remix) by Beyoncé and "Let's Do It Again" by TLC.
