= Millennium Records =

Record label

- Founded: 1976
- Founder: Jimmy Ienner
- Defunct: 1983
- Distributor(s): Casablanca Records (1976-1979); RCA Records (1979-1983)
- Genre: various
- Country of origin: USA

Millennium Records is a defunct record label run by record producer Jimmy Ienner from 1976 to 1983. During its RCA-distributed years, a significant portion of its output was content licensed from Canadian record labels.

== Hits ==
The label's best-selling artist was electronic music pioneer Meco, whose disco cover of John Williams' "Star Wars Theme/Cantina Band" cues from Star Wars was a number 1 hit in 1977. In 1978, Meco followed up with two more movie-inspired hits for the label: a number 25 hit "Theme From Close Encounters" and a number 35 hit "Themes From The Wizard of Oz".

In 1981, Don McLean had three hits on the Millennium label: "Crying" which peaked at number 5; a number 23 song, "Since I Don't Have You" and a number 36 song, "Castles in the Air".

Between 1981 and 1982, the band Franke & the Knockouts had three top 100 hits on Millennium: "Sweetheart" at number 10, "You're My Girl" at number 27, and "Without You" at number 24.

Millennium is noteworthy for having passed on signing Madonna in 1981.

== Artists ==
- Brooklyn Dreams
- Chilliwack
- Daniel Conti
- Johnny Destry
- Bruce Foster
- Bruce Cockburn
- Franke & The Knockouts
- The Godz
- Tommy James
- Lori Lieberman
- Don McLean
- Meco
- Rose
- Rodway
- Joey Travolta
- Yipes!
