= Yarbrough and Peoples =

American R&B duo

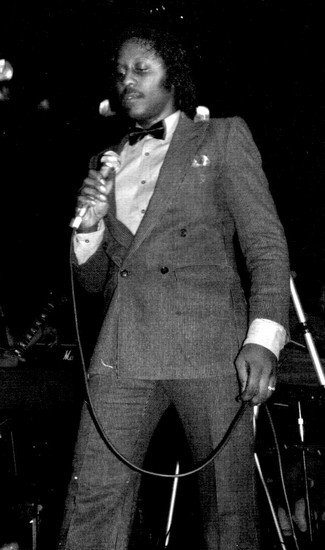
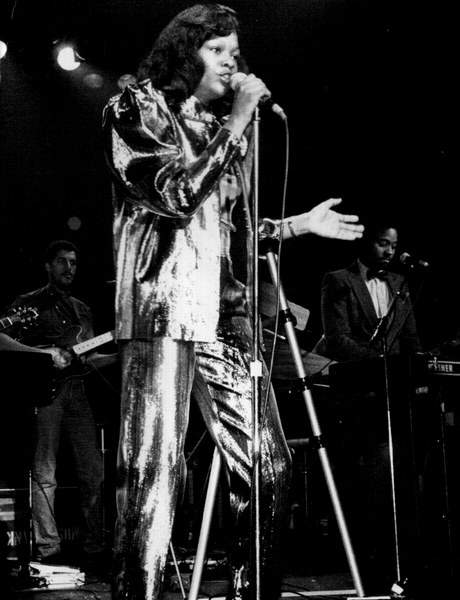
- Cavin Yarbrough and Alisa Peoples in 1983

Background information
- Origin: Dallas, Texas, U.S.
- Genres: R&B, funk, boogie, soul, urban
- Years active: 1980–1986
- Labels: Mercury/PolyGram; Total Experience/RCA
- Past members: Cavin Yarbrough; Alisa Peoples

Yarbrough and Peoples were an American R&B duo from Dallas, Texas. The duo's biggest-selling release was "Don't Stop the Music", a U.S. Billboard R&B chart-topper in 1981.

== Career ==
Cavin Leon Yarbrough (January 22, 1954 – June 19, 2025) and Alisa Delois Peoples (born June 29, 1957) both grew up in Dallas, Texas, having known each other since they were young children, as they had met taking piano lessons, after which they remained friends throughout their childhoods.

In the mid-1970s, Yarbrough was on tour with Leon Russell's band and met the Wilson Brothers, who went on to form the Gap Band. Upon returning to Dallas, the twosome started the band Grand Theft, both as featured keyboardists as well as vocalists. In 1977, the Wilson Brothers had just joined Total Experience Records (which was at that point a production company) as the Gap Band and went down to Dallas to perform a concert. Later that night, trying to unwind after the show, the Wilsons caught the twosome's act, and as a result, Lonnie Simmons (President of Total Experience) invited the couple to Los Angeles where they began playing in clubs around Southern California.

Two years later, they signed their own recording contract with Total Experience and recorded and released their debut album, The Two of Us, which contained "Don't Stop the Music", topping the US Billboard R&B chart in early 1981, knocking their label-mate's song "Burn Rubber (Why You Wanna Hurt Me)" out of the top spot. The song went on to chart higher on the Billboard Hot 100 than any of the other songs released on the label up to that time. In addition, the corresponding album went gold and peaked at No. 16 on the Billboard 200 album chart. The song also reached No. 7 on the UK Singles Chart and was certified silver there.

The duo continued on with its R&B success throughout the 1980s, with four more top-10 R&B hits: "Heartbeats" (R&B No. 10 in 1983), "Don't Waste Your Time" (Pop No. 48, R&B No. 1 in 1984; No. 60 UK), "Guilty" (R&B No. 2 in 1986; No. 53 UK), and "I Wouldn't Lie" (R&B No. 6 in 1986; No. 61 UK), all of which brought the band success. After Guilty, its final album for Total Experience/RCA, Yarbrough and Peoples left the label in 1986.

They married in 1987, and returned to their hometown of Dallas and started their own music production company, Yarbrough & Peoples Productions.

In 2009, they both appeared in the off-Broadway musical Blind Lemon Blues at the York Theater in New York, where Cavin Yarbrough portrayed Lead Belly.

The duo was featured on an episode of TV One's Unsung on September 2, 2015.

Yarbrough died on June 19, 2025, at the age of 71.

== Discography ==
=== Studio albums ===
Year	Title	Peak chart positions			Certifications	Record label
Year	Title	US Pop	US R&B	NLD	Certifications	Record label
1980	The Two of Us	16	1	33	RIAA: Gold	Mercury/PolyGram Records
1983	Heartbeats	—	25	47		Total Experience/PolyGram
1984	Be a Winner	90	6	—		Total Experience/RCA
1986	Guilty	—	13	—		Total Experience/RCA
"—" denotes a recording that did not chart or was not released in that territory.

=== Compilation albums ===
- The Best of Yarbrough & Peoples (1997, Chronicles/Mercury/PolyGram Records)

=== Singles ===
Year	Title	Peak chart positions							Certifications
Year	Title	US Pop	US R&B	US Dan	AUS	CAN	NLD	UK	Certifications
1980	"Don't Stop the Music"	19	1	26	73	40	2	7	RIAA: Gold; BPI: Silver
1981	"Third Degree"	—	74	—	—	—	—	—	
1982	"Heartbeats"	101	10	61	—	—	10	91	
1983	"Feels So Good"	—	20	—	—	—	—	—	
1984	"Don't Waste Your Time"	48	1	11	—	—	—	60	
1984	"Be a Winner"	—	20	—	—	—	—	—	
1984	"I'll Be There"	—	—	—	—	—	—	—	
1985	"Guilty"	—	2	—	—	—	—	53	
1986	"I Wouldn't Lie"	93	6	34	—	—	—	61	
1986	"Wrapped Around Your Finger"	—	46	—	—	—	—	—	
1986	"Don't Stop the Feeling"	—	—	—	—	—	—	—	
"—" denotes a recording that did not chart or was not released in that territory.
