= List of Soul Train episodes =

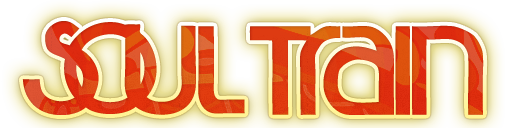

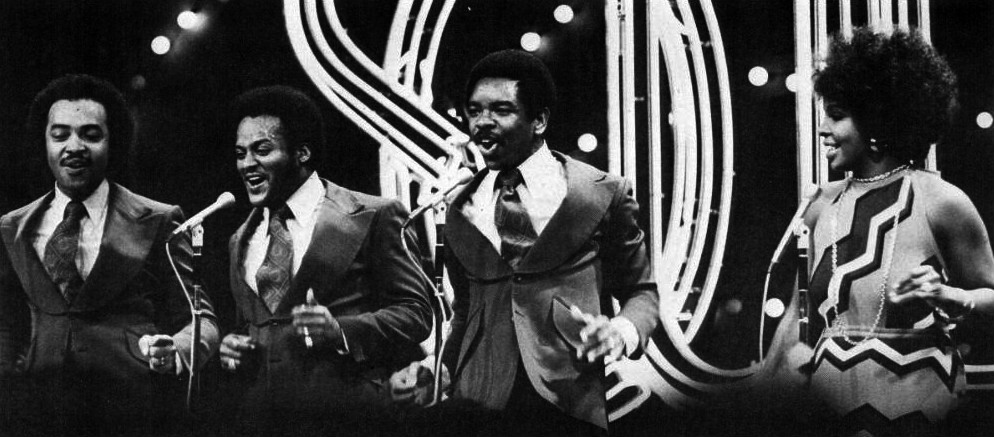
Gladys Knight & the Pips on Soul Train in 1974

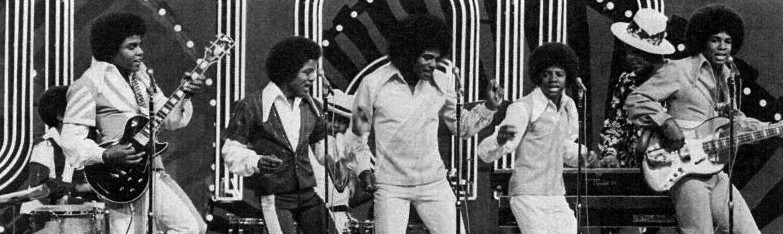
The Jackson 5 on Soul Train

This is a list of episodes for the musical variety show Soul Train. Soul Train premiered on WCIU-TV on August 17, 1970, as a live show airing weekday afternoons. Beginning as a low-budget affair, in black and white, the first episode of the program featured Jerry Butler, The Chi-Lites, and The Emotions as guests. The show would air in syndication from October 2, 1971, to March 25, 2006. The dates shown are original air dates, but some dates are approximate because in the 1970s, most syndication markets did not get the episodes at the same time, so the dates shown are the first airings of the episodes. This is also a list for the Best of Soul Train reruns that aired from 2006 until the show's cancellation in September 2008. The dates shown are the first airings of the episodes.

== Series overview ==
Season	Episodes	Originally aired	
Season	Episodes	Premiere	Finale
1	30	October 2, 1971	April 22, 1972
2	37	September 9, 1972	August 11, 1973
3	39	August 25, 1973	July 20, 1974
4	39	September 7, 1974	June 21, 1975
5	39	August 23, 1975	June 19, 1976
6	39	August 21, 1976	May 14, 1977
7	39	August 20, 1977	May 13, 1978
8	40	August 19, 1978	May 19, 1979
9	32	September 15, 1979	June 14, 1980
10	32	September 20, 1980	June 20, 1981
11	32	September 19, 1981	July 10, 1982
12	24	October 16, 1982	July 16, 1983
13	28	October 15, 1983	June 23, 1984
14	32	September 22, 1984	June 29, 1985
15	28	October 5, 1985	June 21, 1986
16	32	September 20, 1986	June 20, 1987
17	32	September 19, 1987	June 25, 1988
18	32	September 24, 1988	June 24, 1989
19	32	September 23, 1989	June 23, 1990
20	32	September 22, 1990	June 22, 1991
21	32	September 21, 1991	June 20, 1992
22	32	September 26, 1992	June 26, 1993
23	32	October 23, 1993	June 25, 1994
24	32	September 24, 1994	June 24, 1995
25	32	September 23, 1995	June 22, 1996
26	31	October 26, 1996	May 24, 1997
27	32	September 20, 1997	June 20, 1998
28	32	September 19, 1998	June 19, 1999
29	32	September 18, 1999	June 17, 2000
30	32	September 16, 2000	June 30, 2001
31	28	October 13, 2001	July 6, 2002
32	32	September 14, 2002	June 21, 2003
33	28	October 11, 2003	June 26, 2004
34	24	October 9, 2004	June 25, 2005
35	16	November 5, 2005	March 25, 2006
36	56	December 9, 2006	December 29, 2007
37	38	January 5, 2008	September 20, 2008

== Season 1 (1971–1972) ==
Back to Series overview

The first theme song was the 1962 recording of "Hot Potatoes", performed by King Curtis; the song used for the bumpers was "Familiar Footsteps" by Gene Chandler.

No. in season	No. overall	Guests	Original airdate
1	1	Gladys Knight & the Pips, Eddie Kendricks, The Honey Cone, Bobby Hutton	October 2, 1971
2	2	Charlie Wright & the Watts 103rd Street Band, Carla Thomas, General Crook	October 9, 1971
3	3	Chairmen of the Board, Rufus Thomas, Laura Lee	October 16, 1971
4	4	The Staple Singers, Freda Payne	October 23, 1971
5	5	Bill Withers, Al Green, Viola Wills	October 30, 1971
6	6	Lou Rawls, The 100 Proof, The Emotions	November 6, 1971
7	7	Martha & the Vandellas, The Intruders, G.C. Cameron	November 13, 1971
8	8	Friends of Distinction, Clarence Carter	November 20, 1971
9	9	The Chambers Brothers, The Five Stairsteps	November 27, 1971
10	10	Jr. Walker & the All Stars, Bobby Womack, Thelma Houston	December 4, 1971
11	11	Jean Knight, The Delfonics, Maurice Jackson, Ralfi Pagan	December 11, 1971
12	12	The Chi-Lites, Joe Tex, The Originals	December 18, 1971
13	13	Gene Chandler, Simtec & Wylie, The Free Movement	December 25, 1971
14	14	B.B. King, O.C. Smith, Patrice Holloway	January 1, 1972
15	15	Dennis Coffey, The Detroit Emeralds, Jesse James	January 8, 1972
16	16	Little Richard, The Undisputed Truth, Nolan F. Porter	January 15, 1972
17	17	Curtis Mayfield, The Honey Cone, The Persuaders	January 22, 1972
18	18	The Impressions, Merry Clayton, The Three Degrees	January 29, 1972
19	19	The Dells, Kim Weston, Luther Ingram	February 5, 1972
20	20	Jerry Butler & Brenda Lee Eager, Joe Tex, Hodges, Smith, James & Crawford	February 12, 1972
21	21	Al Green, The Whispers, Denise LaSalle	February 19, 1972
22	22	The Four Tops, Jackie Wilson, Kool & the Gang	February 26, 1972
23	23	Gladys Knight & the Pips, The Ohio Players, Garland Green	March 4, 1972
24	24	Rufus Thomas, The Bar-Kays, Laura Lee	March 11, 1972
25	25	The Chi-Lites, Edwin Starr, James Gadsen	March 18, 1972
26	26	Wilson Pickett, Curtis Mayfield, War, Soul Train Dance Contest (Special Guest: Fred Williamson)	March 25, 1972
27	27	Joe Tex, Gloria Lynne, The Independents	April 1, 1972
28	28	Lou Rawls, Otis Clay, The Peaches	April 8, 1972
29	29	The Isley Brothers, Love Unlimited, Millie Jackson	April 15, 1972
30	30	Ike & Tina Turner, Jerry Butler & Brenda Lee Eager	April 22, 1972

== Season 2 (1972–1973) ==
Back to Series overview

No. in season	No. overall	Guests	Original airdate
1	31	Bobby Womack, The Bar-Kays, Candi Staton (Special Guest: Fred Williamson)	September 9, 1972
2	32	The Isley Brothers, Luther Ingram (Special Guests: Melba Moore & Heshimu)	September 16, 1972
3	33	Gladys Knight & the Pips, The O'Jays, Major Lance (Special Guests: Teresa Graves & Brock Peters)	September 23, 1972
4	34	Eddie Kendricks, The Whispers (Special Guest: Bill Russell)	September 30, 1972
5	35	The Jackson 5 featuring Jermaine Jackson	October 7, 1972
6	36	Johnnie Taylor, The Undisputed Truth	October 14, 1972
7	37	Bill Withers, Harold Melvin & the Blue Notes (Special Guest: Denise Nicholas)	October 21, 1972
8	38	Billy Preston, Laura Lee, Johnny Williams (Special Guest: Jim Brown)	October 28, 1972
9	39	Joe Simon, The Sylvers, Billy Paul (Special Guest: Wallace Terry)	November 4, 1972
10	40	Friends of Distinction, The Persuaders, Doug Gibbs (Special Guest: William Marshall)	November 11, 1972
11	41	The Temptations, King Floyd (Special Guest: Cicely Tyson)	November 18, 1972
12	42	The Intruders, Betty Wright, True Reflection (Special Guest: George Kirby)	December 16, 1972
13	43	Billy Paul, Barbara Mason, Anacostia	December 23, 1972
14	44	Tyrone Davis, Lyn Collins (Special Guest: Elgin Baylor)	December 30, 1972
15	45	Curtis Mayfield, The Main Ingredient, Hank Ballard (Special Guest: Vonetta McGee)	January 6, 1973
16	46	Stevie Wonder, The Moments, Fully Guaranteed (Special Guest: Judy Pace)	January 13, 1973
17	47	Johnny Nash, Billy Butler & Infinity, Brighter Side of Darkness	January 27, 1973
18	48	The Dramatics, Syl Johnson, The Smith Connection	February 3, 1973
19	49	James Brown, Lyn Collins	February 10, 1973
20	50	The Four Tops, Otis Clay, Special Guests: James Brown & Teddy Brown, Soul Train Dance Contest Semi-finals	February 17, 1973
21	51	The Spinners, Sisters Love	February 24, 1973
22	52	Al Green, Mel & Tim	March 3, 1973
23	53	Friends of Distinction, Timmy Thomas, The Independents (Special Guest: Richard Pryor)	March 10, 1973
24	54	The Chi-Lites, The Honey Cone, G.C. Cameron (Special Guest: Pam Grier)	March 31, 1973
25	55	The Impressions, Tyrone Davis, Billy Preston (Special Guests: Diana Ross & Brenda Sykes)	April 7, 1973
26	56	Aretha Franklin (Special Guest: Cecil Franklin)	April 14, 1973
27	57	The O'Jays, David Ruffin, Sylvia	April 21, 1973
28	58	The Sylvers, Ronnie Dyson, Archie Bell & the Drells (Special Guest: Rosey Grier)	April 28, 1973
29	59	The Manhattans, Lyn Collins, Lee Auston (Special Guest: James Brown)	May 5, 1973
30	60	The Supremes, Lloyd Price	May 12, 1973
31	61	Bobby Womack, The Whispers, Thelma Houston	May 19, 1973
32	62	Little Anthony & the Imperials, Edwin Starr, The Valentinos	May 26, 1973
33	63	Bill Withers (Special Guest: Steve Manning)	June 16, 1973
34	64	The Miracles, Chuck Jackson, The Jackson Sisters (Special Guest: Smokey Robinson)	June 23, 1973
35	65	Chairmen of the Board, Charles Mann, Sylvia (Special Guest: Jeffrey Bowen)	June 30, 1973
36	66	Chuck Berry, Maxayan, Willie Hutch (Special Guest: Max Julien)	July 7, 1973
37	67	"The Best of Soul Train" featuring James Brown, The Jackson 5, Chuck Berry, The O'Jays, The Temptations, Al Green, Curtis Mayfield, The Supremes, Teddy Brown, The Four Tops, and Stevie Wonder	August 11, 1973

== Season 3 (1973–1974) ==
Back to Series overview

Starting with episode 76, the show's theme was changed to "TSOP (The Sound of Philadelphia)", written by Gamble and Huff and performed by MFSB and the Three Degrees.

No. in season	No. overall	Guests	Original airdate
1	68	The Intruders, Foster Sylvers (Introduced by Edmund & Ricky Sylvers)	August 25, 1973
2	69	The Whispers, Mandrill,	September 1, 1973
3	70	Fred Wesley & the JB's, Lyn Collins, The Sly, the Slick and the Wicked	September 8, 1973
4	71	The Sylvers	September 15, 1973
5	72	The Isley Brothers, Betty Wright, Jr. Walker & the All-Stars	September 22, 1973
6	73	Eddie Kendricks, The Dramatics, Rufus	September 29, 1973
7	74	B.B. King, The Moments	October 6, 1973
8	75	The Four Tops, Bloodstone, Lee Charles	October 13, 1973
9	76	Barry White, Love Unlimited, The Temprees (Special Guest: Lola Falana)	October 27, 1973
10	77	The Jackson 5	November 3, 1973
11	78	Curtis Mayfield, Millie Jackson, Natural Four	November 10, 1973
12	79	Tower of Power, The Pointer Sisters, Tavares	November 17, 1973
13	80	Smokey Robinson, First Choice, Al Wilson	November 24, 1973
14	81	The Temptations, G.C. Cameron	December 1, 1973
15	82	Bobby Bland, Ashford & Simpson, Barbara Jean English	December 8, 1973
16	83	Johnnie Taylor, Ann Peebles, Maceo & the Macks	December 15, 1973
17	84	Eddie Kendricks, The Persuaders, Eddie Floyd	December 22, 1973
18	85	Billy Preston, Creative Source, Eric Mercury	January 5, 1974
19	86	Johnny Nash, Kool & the Gang, The Originals	January 12, 1974
20	87	The 5th Dimension, Willie Hutch	January 26, 1974
21	88	Johnny Mathis, The Dells	February 9, 1974
22	89	Marvin Gaye, The Whispers	February 16, 1974
23	90	Harold Melvin & the Blue Notes, Billy Paul, Maxine Weldon	February 23, 1974
24	91	Jerry Butler, The Delfonics, Cecil Shaw	March 2, 1974
25	92	Curtis Mayfield, The Main Ingredient, Bloodstone	March 30, 1974
26	93	Al Green, The Impressions	April 6, 1974
27	94	The Stylistics, Bobby Womack, The Undisputed Truth	April 13, 1974
28	95	The Four Tops, Blue Magic, Barbara Mason	April 20, 1974
29	96	Eddie Kendricks, The Dramatics, Martha Reeves	April 27, 1974
30	97	Gladys Knight & the Pips, Lamont Dozier	May 4, 1974
31	98	Sylvia Robinson, The Moments, Ecstasy, Passion & Pain	May 11, 1974
32	99	The Spinners, The Independents, Leroy Hutson	May 18, 1974
33	100	Bill Withers, The Soul Children, Melvin Van Peebles	May 25, 1974
34	101	Tyrone Davis, Hugh Masekela, Black Ivory	June 1, 1974
35	102	The Staple Singers, Bunny Sigler	June 8, 1974
36	103	Kool & the Gang, Al Wilson, Natural Four	June 15, 1974
37	104	The O'Jays, Ramsey Lewis	June 22, 1974
38	105	Sly & the Family Stone, The Trammps	June 29, 1974
39	106	"The Best of Soul Train"	July 20, 1974

== Season 4 (1974–1975) ==
Back to Series overview

No. in season	No. overall	Guests	Original airdate
1	107	Billy Preston, Rufus, George McCrae	September 7, 1974
2	108	James Brown and the First Family of Soul, Fred Wesley & the JBs, Lyn Collins, Sweet Charles	September 14, 1974
3	109	Johnnie Taylor, The Joneses, Syreeta Wright	September 21, 1974
4	110	The Miracles, Herbie Hancock, Yvonne Fair	September 28, 1974
5	111	Michael Jackson, MDLT	October 5, 1974
6	112	The Four Tops, New Birth, Creative Source	October 12, 1974
7	113	The Chi-Lites, Bloodstone, New York City	October 19, 1974
8	114	Ashford & Simpson, Tavares, Little Beaver	October 26, 1974
9	115	The 5th Dimension, Al Wilson, Formula IV, Special Guest: Marc Gordon	November 2, 1974
10	116	The Ohio Players, Ecstasy, Passion & Pain, B.T. Express	November 9, 1974
11	117	Nancy Wilson, Johnny Bristol, Mighty Clouds of Joy	November 16, 1974
12	118	The Moments, Labelle, Carl Carlton	December 7, 1974
13	119	The Isley Brothers	December 14, 1974
14	120	Jose Feliciano, Minnie Riperton, The Dynamic Superiors	December 21, 1974
15	121	Johnny Nash, The Commodores, Lonnie Youngblood	December 28, 1974
16	122	Bobby Womack, Latimore, The Kay-Gees	January 4, 1975
17	123	Graham Central Station, Zulema, Leon Haywood	January 11, 1975
18	124	Ike & Tina Turner, Lonette McKee	January 18, 1975
19	125	David Ruffin, Shirley Brown, 9th Creation, The Lockers	January 25, 1975
20	126	Tower of Power, Hues Corporation, Garland Green	February 1, 1975
21	127	The Crusaders, The Whispers	February 8, 1975
22	128	Rufus featuring Chaka Khan, Gino Vannelli, Bohannon	February 15, 1975
23	129	Kool & the Gang, Charles Wright & the Watts 103rd Street Rhythm Band, The Jackson Sisters	February 22, 1975
24	130	Jimmy Ruffin, Buddy Miles, The Manhattans	March 1, 1975
25	131	Lou Rawls, The Main Ingredient, Gloria Scott	March 8, 1975
26	132	Bobby Bland, Tavares, Lyn Collins, Fred Wesley & Steam	March 15, 1975
27	133	Bloodstone, Carol Douglas, Syl Johnson	March 22, 1975
28	134	B.B. King, The Younghearts, People's Choice	March 29, 1975
29	135	Al Green	April 5, 1975
30	136	Blue Magic, Sister Sledge, Major Harris	April 12, 1975
31	137	The Dramatics, Barbara Mason, Ben E. King	April 19, 1975
32	138	Eddie Kendricks, L.T.D., The Waters	April 26, 1975
33	139	Melba Moore, Eddie Harris, Bunny Sigler	May 3, 1975
34	140	Dionne Warwick, Greg Perry, The Futures	May 10, 1975
35	141	Elton John, Mandrill, Comedian: Karl Grigsby	May 17, 1975
36	142	Barry White, Love Unlimited Orchestra	May 24, 1975
37	143	Curtis Mayfield, Leroy Hutson, Natural Four	June 7, 1975
38	144	Smokey Robinson, Betty Wright	June 14, 1975
39	145	Harold Melvin & The Blue Notes, The Southshore Commission (Guest Host: Richard Pryor)	June 21, 1975

== Season 5 (1975–1976) ==
Back to Series overview

With the start of this season, Soul Train instituted a new theme: "Soul Train '75" by The Soul Train Gang.

No. in season	No. overall	Guests	Original airdate
1	146	The Supremes, Willie Hutch	August 23, 1975
2	147	Johnny Bristol, The Blackbyrds	August 30, 1975
3	148	Joe Simon, Millie Jackson, Choice Four	September 6, 1975
4	149	The New Birth, Blue Magic, Bobby Moore	September 13, 1975
5	150	The Impressions, Rance Allen Group, Soul Train Dance Contest	September 20, 1975
6	151	Eddie Kendricks, Tavares, Comedian: Paul Mooney	September 27, 1975
7	152	The Pointer Sisters, B.T. Express, Ralph Carter	October 4, 1975
8	153	The O'Jays, Little Milton, Special Guest: Cholly Atkins	October 11, 1975
9	154	Labelle, Creative Source	October 18, 1975
10	155	Minnie Riperton, Twenty First Century	October 25, 1975
11	156	Ramsey Lewis, Fantastic Four	November 1, 1975
12	157	The Spinners, Merry Clayton	November 8, 1975
13	158	War, The Main Ingredient	November 15, 1975
14	159	Harold Melvin & The Blue Notes, Esther Phillips	November 22, 1975
15	160	The Miracles, Poison, Quincy Jones (Special Guest: Nat Adderley)	November 29, 1975
16	161	Average White Band, The Undisputed Truth	December 6, 1975
17	162	Rufus featuring Chaka Khan, David Ruffin	December 13, 1975
18	163	Freda Payne, The Whispers	December 20, 1975
19	164	Billy Preston, The Sylvers	December 27, 1975
20	165	David Bowie, Faith, Hope and Charity, Jeff Perry	January 3, 1976
21	166	The Temptations, Edwin Starr	January 10, 1976
22	167	The Staple Singers, Bobby Womack	January 17, 1976
23	168	The Jackson 5	January 24, 1976
24	169	The Dells, Bloodstone	January 31, 1976
25	170	Bill Withers, The Soul Train Gang	February 7, 1976
26	171	The Jimmy Castor Bunch, Leon Haywood, The Southshore Commission	February 14, 1976
27	172	The Commodores, George McCrae	February 21, 1976
28	173	Joe Tex, The Chi-Lites, Comedian: Tom Dreesen	February 28, 1976
29	174	Wilson Pickett, Betty Wright, The Modulations	March 6, 1976
30	175	Eddie Kendricks, The Temprees	March 13, 1976
31	176	Johnnie Taylor, Donna Summer	March 20, 1976
32	177	The Supremes, Al Wilson	March 27, 1976
33	178	The Dramatics, Dorothy Moore, Leon Thomas	April 3, 1976
34	179	Kool & The Gang, Ashford & Simpson, Ronnie McNeir	May 1, 1976
35	180	The Delfonics, D.J. Rogers	May 8, 1976
36	181	Billy Paul, The Trammps	May 15, 1976
37	182	Archie Bell & the Drells, Brass Construction	May 22, 1976
38	183	Rufus featuring Chaka Khan, The Checkmates, The Booty People	June 12, 1976
39	184	The 5th Dimension, The Brothers Johnson, Pat Lundy	June 19, 1976

== Season 6 (1976–1977) ==
Back to Series overview

Starting with the ninth episode, Soul Train has a new theme song: "Soul Train '76" by The Soul Train Gang.

No. in season	No. overall	Guests	Original airdate
1	185	Johnnie Taylor, The Tymes	August 21, 1976
2	186	The Sylvers, Sun, Special Guest: Frankie Crocker	August 28, 1976
3	187	Melba Moore, The Whispers	September 4, 1976
4	188	The O'Jays, Thelma Houston	September 11, 1976
5	189	D.J. Rogers, The Lockers, Soul Train National Dance Contest	September 18, 1976
6	190	Labelle, Brother to Brother	September 25, 1976
7	191	The Spinners, David Ruffin	October 2, 1976
8	192	Jermaine Jackson, Tata Vega	October 9, 1976
9	193	The Emotions, The Rimshots, The Ritchie Family	October 16, 1976
10	194	Marilyn McCoo & Billy Davis Jr., Deniece Williams	October 23, 1976
11	195	The Undisputed Truth, Impact, Carol Douglas	October 30, 1976
12	196.	The Four Tops, Vicki Sue Robinson	November 6, 1976
13	197.	Aretha Franklin, Ronnie Dyson	November 13, 1976
14	198.	The Manhattans, Brass Construction, Rose Royce	November 20, 1976
15	199.	K.C. and the Sunshine Band, Dee Dee Bridgewater	November 27, 1976
16	200.	The Ohio Players, Johnny Bristol	December 4, 1976
17	201.	Average White Band, The Soul Train Gang	December 11, 1976
18	202.	O.C. Smith, Dorothy Moore	December 18, 1976
19	203.	The Moments, Donna Summer	December 25, 1976
20	204.	The Supremes, Al Hudson & the Soul Partners	January 1, 1977
21	205.	The Sylvers, Donald Byrd & the Blackbyrds	January 8, 1977
22	206.	Billy Paul, Brick	January 15, 1977
23	207.	Lou Rawls, L.T.D.	January 22, 1977
24	208.	Billy Preston, Brenda Payton	January 29, 1977
25	209.	Rufus featuring Chaka Khan, The Impressions	February 5, 1977
26	210.	The Commodores, Thelma Houston	February 12, 1977
27	211.	The Dramatics, Randy Crawford, Crown Heights Affair	February 19, 1977
28	212.	Ashford & Simpson, Bootsy's Rubber Band	February 26, 1977
29	213.	Latimore, Shalamar, Crown Heights Affair	March 5, 1977
30	214.	Natalie Cole, Arthur Prysock	March 12, 1977
31	215.	Al Green, Fatback Band	March 19, 1977
32	216.	Melba Moore, Joe Tex	March 26, 1977
33	217.	Roy Ayers Ubiquity, Lonnie Liston Smith, Gwen McCrae	April 2, 1977
34	218.	B.T. Express, Letta Mbulu, Enchantment	April 9, 1977
35	219.	Archie Bell & the Drells, Brainstorm	April 16, 1977
36	220.	Teddy Pendergrass, Double Exposure	April 23, 1977
37	221.	Smokey Robinson, Lakeside	April 30, 1977
38	222.	Marvin Gaye	May 7, 1977
39	223.	Harold Melvin & the Blue Notes, Side Effect	May 14, 1977

== Season 7 (1977–1978) ==
Back to Series overview

Season	Series	Guests	Original airdate
1	224.	O.C. Smith, Hot, Floaters	August 20, 1977
2	225.	Jermaine Jackson, Switch	August 27, 1977
3	226.	The O'Jays/ Al Jarreau / Truth	September 3, 1977
4	227.	Johnny Guitar Watson, The Whispers	September 10, 1977
5	228.	Tyrone Davis, Dorothy Moore	September 17, 1977
6	229.	The Dramatics, Tata Vega	September 24, 1977
7	230.	The Emotions, Maze featuring Frankie Beverly	October 1, 1977
8	231.	Lamont Dozier, Phyllis Hyman, High Inergy	October 8, 1977
9	232.	Smokey Robinson, Dee Dee Sharp	October 15, 1977
10	233.	Tavares, David Oliver	October 22, 1977
11	234.	Johnnie Taylor, Millie Jackson	October 29, 1977
12	235.	Teddy Pendergrass, Rose Royce	November 5, 1977
13	236.	Barry White, Love Unlimited	November 12, 1977
14	237.	Lou Rawls, The Ritchie Family	November 19, 1977
15	238.	The Manhattans, Kellee Patterson	November 26, 1977
16	239.	Deniece Williams, Mother's Finest	December 3, 1977
17	240.	Ashford & Simpson, Ronnie Dyson	December 10, 1977
18	241.	The Spinners, Hodges, James & Smith	December 17, 1977
19	242.	Brick/ Sister Sledge	December 24, 1977
20	243.	Philippé Wynne, Side Effect, Al Hudson & the Soul Partners	December 31, 1977
21	244.	Brothers Johnson, Foster Sylvers	January 7, 1978
22	245.	Freda Payne, Ronnie Laws, Morris Jefferson	January 14, 1978
23	246.	The Sylvers, Lawrence Hilton-Jacobs	January 21, 1978
24	247.	Bill Withers, Odyssey	January 28, 1978
25	248.	L.T.D., Michael Henderson	February 4, 1978
26	249.	The Temptations, William Bell, Pattie Brooks	February 11, 1978
27	250.	War, Eloise Laws	February 18, 1978
28	251.	Billy Preston, Esther Phillips	February 25, 1978
29	252.	Lonnie Jordan, Brass Construction, Pattie Brooks	March 4, 1978
30	253.	The Four Tops, Con Funk Shun	March 11, 1978
31	254.	Bobby Womack, Denise LaSalle	March 18, 1978
32	255.	Marilyn McCoo & Billy Davis Jr., Cheryl Barnes, Stargard	March 25, 1978
33	256.	Harold Melvin & the Blue Notes, Roy Ayers	April 1, 1978
34	257.	Johnny Mathis, Deniece Williams	April 8, 1978
35	258.	Enchantment, Wild Cherry, Bunny Sigler	April 15, 1978
36	259.	Herb Alpert & Hugh Masekela, Aalon	April 22, 1978
37	260.	The 5th Dimension, Mandrill	April 29, 1978
38	261.	Smokey Robinson, Patti Austin	May 6, 1978
39	262.	Cuba Gooding, Lenny Williams	May 13, 1978

== Season 8 (1978–1979) ==
Back to Series overview

Soul Train has a new theme this season, starting with episode 267: "Soul Train Theme '79" by The Hollywood Disco Jazz Band and The Waters.

Season	Series	Guests	Original airdate
1	263.	The O'Jays, Etta James	August 19, 1978
2	264.	Brothers Johnson, The Dells	August 26, 1978
3	265.	The Emotions, Randy Jackson, Hal Jackson's Talented Teen"	September 2, 1978
4	266.	The Sylvers, Kenny Brawner & Raw Sugar	September 9, 1978
5	267.	Earth Wind & Fire (in concert)/ Heaven & Earth	September 16, 1978
6	268.	Rose Royce, D.J. Rogers	September 23, 1978
7	269.	Peabo Bryson, Stargard	September 30, 1978
8	270.	Larry Graham & Graham Central Station, Charles Jackson	October 7, 1978
9	271.	The Whispers, Gil Scott-Heron, Evelyn "Champagne" King	October 14, 1978
10	272.	Melba Moore, Michael Henderson	October 21, 1978
11	273.	Freda Payne, Atlantic Starr	October 28, 1978
12	274.	The Trammps, Shalamar, Norma Jean Wright	November 4, 1978
13	275.	Frankie Valli, Creme D'Coca	November 11, 1978
14	276.	Jerry Butler, Rick James	November 18, 1978
15	277.	Lenny Williams, Mother's Finest, Cheech & Chong	November 25, 1978
16	278.	Johnny Guitar Watson, Jean Carne	December 2, 1978
17	279.	Stylistics, Sun	December 9, 1978
18	280.	Barry White, Danny Pearson	December 16, 1978
19	281.	Switch, The McCrarys	December 23, 1978
20	282.	The Temptations, Randy Brown	December 30, 1978
21	283.	Marilyn McCoo & Billy Davis Jr., Lakeside	January 6, 1979
22	284.	Roy Ayers & Ubiquity, Sarah Dash	January 13, 1979
23	285.	Gene Chandler, Chic	January 20, 1979
24	286.	Brass Construction, Peaches & Herb, Captain Sky	January 27, 1979
25	287.	The Jacksons	February 3, 1979
26	288.	Pattie Brooks, David Oliver	February 10, 1979
27	289.	Joe Simon, Cheryl Lynn	February 17, 1979
28	290.	Edwin Starr, The Jimmy Castor Bunch, Grace Jones	February 24, 1979
29	291.	Bonnie Pointer, Dan Hartman	March 3, 1979
30	292.	Gino Vannelli, Gloria Gaynor, Spotlight Dance routine: Cheryl Song & Randy Thomas	March 10, 1979
31	293.	The Bar-Kays, Arpeggio, Spotlight Dance Routine: Janice Carr & Abe Clark	March 17, 1979
32	294.	Isaac Hayes, Tasha Thomas	March 24, 1979
33	295.	Instant Funk, Cerrone	March 31, 1979
34	296.	Billy Preston & Syreeta Wright, Chuck Brown & The Soul Searchers	April 7, 1979
35	297.	Curtis Mayfield, Linda Clifford, Keith Barrow	April 14, 1979
36	298.	Amii Stewart, Boney M	April 21, 1979
37	299.	Hamilton Bohannon, The Raes	April 28, 1979
38	300.	Third World, Danny Pearson	May 5, 1979
39	301.	Tyrone Davis, Gary's Gang	May 12, 1979
40	302.	Carrie Lucas, GQ, The Gap Band, Spotlight Dance Routine: Sherri Foster & Vince Carlos	May 19, 1979

== Season 9 (1979–1980) ==
Back to Series overview

Starting with episode 319, the theme changed to a prototype of "Up on Soul Train" by The Waters.

Season	Series	Guests	Original airdate
1	303.	"A Tribute to Minnie Riperton" (featuring Stevie Wonder, Wintley Phipps, Lorraine Fields and Larry Vickers)	September 15, 1979
2	304.	Deniece Williams, Apollo, Professional Dance Routine: Frances Lee Morgan and Michael Peters	September 22, 1979
3	305.	Shalamar, Tata Vega	September 29, 1979
4	306.	Bonnie Pointer, Switch	October 6, 1979
5	307.	David Ruffin, Heatwave	October 13, 1979
6	308.	Rick James & the Stone City Band, Teena Marie, Spotlight Dance Routine: Larry "Bobcat" Jeffries	October 20, 1979
7	309.	Billy Preston, Creme D'Coca	October 27, 1979
8	310.	The Bar-Kays, McFadden & Whitehead, Spotlight Dance Routine: Jeffrey Daniel & The Eclipse	November 3, 1979
9	311.	Herb Alpert, Dynasty	November 10, 1979
10	312.	Salute to Smokey Robinson, Keith & Darrell	November 17, 1979
11	313.	The Whispers, Vernon Burch, Comedian: Tom Dreesen	November 24, 1979
12	314.	Salute to Aretha Franklin	December 1, 1979
13	315.	Johnnie Taylor, Lakeside	January 19, 1980
14	316.	The Commodores	January 26, 1980
15	317.	War	February 2, 1980
16	318.	Chic, High Inergy, Comedian: Dick Gregory	February 9, 1980
17	319.	Lou Rawls, Narada Michael Walden	March 1, 1980
18	320.	Shalamar, The Gap Band	March 8, 1980
19	321.	The Whispers, Patrice Rushen	March 15, 1980
20	322.	L.T.D., Cheryl Lynn	March 22, 1980
21	323.	Harold Melvin & the Blue Notes, Brass Construction	March 29, 1980
22	324.	Sister Sledge, Randy Brown	April 5, 1980
23	325.	The Spinners, Con Funk Shun	April 12, 1980
24	326.	Captain & Tennille, The Ritchie Family (Introduction by Jacques Morali), Dance Routine: The Electric Boogaloos	April 19, 1980
25	327.	Stephanie Mills, Roy Ayers	April 26, 1980
26	328.	Village People, Side Effect	May 3, 1980
27	329.	Jermaine Jackson, Dramatics	May 10, 1980
28	330.	Salute to Gladys Knight & the Pips	May 17, 1980
29	331.	Ray, Goodman & Brown, Ray Parker Jr. & Raydio, Spotlight Dance Routine: Kirk Washington	May 24, 1980
30	332.	Salute to The Temptations, Syreeta Wright	May 31, 1980
31	333.	Leon Haywood, L.A. Boppers	June 7, 1980
32	334.	Salute to Barry White	June 14, 1980

== Season 10 (1980–1981) ==
Back to Series overview

Soul Train institutes a new theme: "Up on Soul Train" by R&B group The Whispers.

Season	Series	Guests	Original airdate
1	335	Brothers Johnson, Rockie Robbins, Dance Showdown: Bobcat vs. Mr. X	September 20, 1980
2	336	L.T.D., Seventh Wonder, Kurtis Blow	September 27, 1980
3	337	Larry Graham, Irene Cara	October 4, 1980
4	338	Rick James, The S.O.S. Band	October 11, 1980
5	339	Tyrone Davis, Teena Marie, Comedian: Tom Dreesen	October 18, 1980
6	340	Teddy Pendergrass, The Jones Girls	October 25, 1980
7	341	Cameo, Edmund Sylvers, Special Guest: Kim Fields	November 1, 1980
8	342	Michael Henderson, La Toya Jackson	November 8, 1980
9	343	Shalamar, Mtume	November 15, 1980
10	344	Lakeside, Geraldine Hunt	November 22, 1980
11	345	Lenny Williams, Yellow Magic Orchestra	November 29, 1980
12	346	Ray, Goodman & Brown, Gently	December 6, 1980
13	347	Al Green, The Dells, Soul Train History Book: LaBelle	January 10, 1981
14	348	Dynasty, Tierra, Soul Train History Book: Marvin Gaye	January 17, 1981
15	349	The Stylistics, Spyro Gyra, Soul Train History Book: The Four Tops	January 24, 1981
16	350	The Chi-Lites, Patrice Rushen, Soul Train History Book: Lou Rawls	January 31, 1981
17	351	Deniece Williams, The Gap Band, Soul Train History Book: Curtis Mayfield	March 7, 1981
18	352	The Bar-Kays, Yarbrough & Peoples, Robert Winters	March 14, 1981
19	353	The Pointer Sisters, Con Funk Shun, Soul Train History Book: Billy Paul	March 21, 1981
20	354	The Whispers, Carrie Lucas	March 28, 1981
21	355	Rufus, Dee Dee Sharp	April 4, 1981
22	356	Billy Preston, Lakeside	April 11, 1981
23	357	Shalamar, Teena Marie	April 18, 1981
24	358	A Taste of Honey, Jerry Knight, Soul Train History Book: David Ruffin	April 25, 1981
25	359	Sister Sledge, Atlantic Starr	May 2, 1981
26	360	The Spinners, Skyy, Comedian: Arsenio Hall	May 9, 1981
27	361	Sugarhill Gang, Patrice Rushen, Spotlight Dance routine: Shabba Doo	May 16, 1981
28	362	Betty Wright, Funkadelic, Soul Train History Book: Joe Tex	May 23, 1981
29	363	Bill Withers, Side Effect, Special Guests: Leon & Jayne Kennedy	May 30, 1981
30	364	Jermaine Jackson, T-Connection, Comedian: Marsha Warfield	June 6, 1981
31	365	Rick James, Brenda Russell	June 13, 1981
32	366	Cameo, Mantra	June 20, 1981

== Season 11 (1981–1982) ==
Back to Series overview

The show has moved from Metromedia Square to Charlie Chaplin Studios, where it would remain there, until season 14.

Season	Series	Guests	Original airdate
1	367	Barry White, Glodean White	September 19, 1981
2	368	Phyllis Hyman, Carl Carlton, Mike Weaver	September 26, 1981
3	369	Deniece Williams, Richard "Dimples" Fields	October 3, 1981
4	370	Brothers Johnson, La Toya Jackson	October 10, 1981
5	371	Salute to Rick James, Soul Train History Book: Rick James	October 17, 1981
6	372	The Four Tops, Stacy Lattisaw, Comedian: Arsenio Hall	October 24, 1981
7	373	José Feliciano, Stone City Band	October 31, 1981
8	374	Brick, Frankie Smith, Soul Train History Book: The Supremes	November 7, 1981
9	375	Patti LaBelle, The Time, Comedian: James Wesley Jackson	November 14, 1981
10	376	George Benson, Patti Austin, Soul Train History Book: The Floaters	November 21, 1981
11	377	The Spinners, Bobby Womack, Special Guests: Hal Jackson's Talented Teens	December 12, 1981
12	378	Rockie Robbins, Slave	December 19, 1981
13	379	Skyy, O'Bryan, Comedians: Tim O'Brien and Ken Sevara	January 9, 1982
14	380	L.T.D., James Ingram	January 16, 1982
15	381	Syreeta, Zoom	January 23, 1982
16	382	Salute to Diana Ross	January 30, 1982
17	383	Irene Cara, Andraé Crouch	March 27, 1982
18	384	Al Jarreau, Aurra	April 3, 1982
19	385	The Whispers, Mary Wells	April 10, 1982
20	386	The Chi-Lites, Bill Summers & Summers Heat	April 17, 1982
21	387	Tribute to Smokey Robinson, Bettye Lavette	April 24, 1982
22	388	Sister Sledge, Ray Parker Jr., Soul Train History Book: Smokey Robinson	May 1, 1982
23	389	Lakeside, Sheree Brown	May 8, 1982
24	390	George Duke, D-Train	May 15, 1982
25	391	War, O'Bryan, Soul Train History Book: Chairmen of the Board	May 22, 1982
26	392	Ronnie Dyson, The Dazz Band, Ebony Fashion Fair models	May 29, 1982
27	393	Al Green, Third World	June 5, 1982
28	394	Deniece Williams, Junior, Soul Train History Book: Ben E. King	June 12, 1982
29	395	Cameo, Patrice Rushen, Soul Train History Book: Marvin Gaye	June 19, 1982
30	396	Bobby Womack, The Gap Band, Cameo: Rev. Jesse Jackson	June 26, 1982
31	397	The O'Jays, Gene Chandler	July 3, 1982
32	398	A Taste of Honey, Jeffrey Osborne, Soul Train History Book: Al Green	July 10, 1982

== Season 12 (1982–1983) ==
Back to Series overview

After Episode 410, production went on hiatus due to Don Cornelius having a major brain surgery, and the show was rerun for 16 weeks. Starting with episode 411, the new theme is "Soul Train's a Comin'" by O'Bryan, which began the new episodes that Don produced upon his return to the show.

Season	Series	Guests	Original airdate
1	399	A Tribute to Joe Tex, Special Guest & Co-Host: Barry White	October 16, 1982
2	400	Evelyn "Champagne" King, Glen Edward Thomas, Alice Arthur	October 23, 1982
3	401	A Salute to Jermaine Jackson, DeBarge	October 30, 1982
4	402	Larry Graham, The Busboys	November 6, 1982
5	403	Salute to Lionel Richie, Ozone, Special Guests: Hal Jackson's Talented Teens	November 13, 1982
6	404	Jerry Butler, Daryl Hall & John Oates	November 20, 1982
7	405	Luther Vandross, Cheryl Lynn	November 27, 1982
8	406	Johnnie Taylor, Tavares	December 4, 1982
9	407	Chuck Mangione, Howard Johnson, Soul Train History Book: Aretha Franklin	December 11, 1982
10	408	Michael McDonald, Janet Jackson, Music Video: Stevie Wonder	December 18, 1982
11	409	The Time, Magic Lady, Soul Train History Book: David Bowie	December 25, 1982
12	410	Vanity 6, Carl Carlton, Soul Train History Book: Frankie Valli	January 1, 1983
13	411	The Bar-Kays, O'Bryan, Special Guests: Los Angeles Lakers featuring Magic Johnson and Norm Nixon	April 30, 1983
14	412	The Gap Band, Yarbrough & Peoples, Robert "Goodie" Whitfield	May 7, 1983
15	413	DeBarge, Champaign, Soul Train History Book: Ramsey Lewis	May 14, 1983
16	414	Evelyn "Champagne" King, Grandmaster Flash & the Furious Five, Soul Train History Book: Sylvia, Special Guest: B.B.D. Banana	May 21, 1983
17	415	Angela Bofill, Con Funk Shun, Soul Train History Book: Herb Alpert	May 28, 1983
18	416	The Temptations, Anita Baker, Music Video: Prince	June 4, 1983
19	417	A Tribute to Marvin Gaye	June 11, 1983
20	418	Deniece Williams, Kiddo, Soul Train History Book: Captain & Tennille	June 18, 1983
21	419	The Whispers, Nona Hendryx, Soul Train History Book: Gladys Knight & the Pips	June 25, 1983
22	420	Lakeside, High Inergy, Soul Train History Book: The 5th Dimension	July 2, 1983
23	421	Thelma Houston, The System, Soul Train History Book: Blue Magic	July 9, 1983
24	422	O'Bryan, Imagination	July 16, 1983

== Season 13 (1983–1984) ==
Back to Series overview

At the start of this season, a remixed version of "Soul Train's a Comin' (Party Down)" is used as the theme.

Season	Series	Guests	Original airdate
1	423	Manhattans, Philip Bailey, Soul Train History Book: Kool & the Gang	October 15, 1983
2	424	Jeffrey Osborne, Midnight Star, Special Guest: T. K. Carter	October 22, 1983
3	425	Al Green, Planet Patrol	October 29, 1983
4	426	The S.O.S. Band, Mary Jane Girls/Soul Train History Book: Jackie Wilson	November 5, 1983
5	427	The Gap Band, Michael Sembello	November 12, 1983
6	428	Sister Sledge, Lillo Thomas, Music Video: Gladys Knight and the Pips	November 19, 1983
7	429	Jennifer Holliday, Klique, Soul Train History Book: Jermaine Jackson	November 26, 1983
8	430	The Manhattan Transfer, Kashif, Music Video: Lionel Richie	December 3, 1983
9	431	Herbie Hancock, DeBarge	December 10, 1983
10	432	Kool & the Gang, Tavares, Special Guests: Hal Jackson and Talented Teen Winner: Delise Jones	December 17, 1983
11	433	The Commodores, Anita Baker, Music Video: Herbie Hancock	December 24, 1983
12	434	Atlantic Starr, James Ingram, Soul Train History Book: Tower of Power	December 31, 1983
13	435	Cheryl Lynn, Con Funk Shun	January 14, 1984
14	436	Ray Parker Jr., New Edition, Music Video : Michael Jackson & Paul McCartney – Say Say Say	February 11, 1984
15	437	Evelyn "Champagne" King, D-Train	February 18, 1984
16	438	Tom Tom Club, Howard Johnson	February 25, 1984
17	439	Teena Marie, Womack & Womack, Music Video: The Police	March 31, 1984
18	440	Patti LaBelle, J. Blackfoot	April 7, 1984
19	441	Bobby Womack, Shannon	April 14, 1984
20	442	The Pointer Sisters, Bobby Nunn	April 21, 1984
21	443	Shalamar, Nona Hendryx, Music Video: Daryl Hall & John Oates	April 28, 1984
22	444	Tribute to Dionne Warwick, NYC Breakers	May 5, 1984
23	445	Dennis Edwards, Newcleus, Music Video: "Weird Al" Yankovic	May 12, 1984
24	446	Yarbrough & Peoples, Stacy Lattisaw & Johnny Gill	May 19, 1984
25	447	O'Bryan, Reel 2 Real, Music Video: Culture Club	May 26, 1984
26	448	The O'Jays, The Romantics	June 9, 1984
27	449	The Dazz Band, Run-D.M.C., Music Video: Huey Lewis and the News, Special Guest: Jesse Peralez	June 16, 1984
28	450	Marilyn McCoo & Billy Davis Jr., The Deele, Kim Fields	June 23, 1984

== Season 14 (1984–1985) ==
Back to Series overview

Season	Series	Guests	Original airdate
1	451	O'Bryan, New Edition, Ollie & Jerry	September 22, 1984
2	452	Lakeside, Vanity, Music Video: O'Bryan	September 29, 1984
3	453	Cameo, Billy Ocean, Music Video: Sheila E.	October 6, 1984
4	454	Stephanie Mills, Richard "Dimples" Fields, Special Guest: Michael Winslow	October 13, 1984
5	455	Joyce Kennedy, Randy Hall, Music Video: The Jacksons	October 20, 1984
6	456	Jeffrey Osborne, Alicia Myers, Mr. T	October 27, 1984
7	457	Lillo Thomas, Cherrelle, Music Video: The Fat Boys	November 3, 1984
8	458	Janet Jackson, Beau Williams, Comedian: Brad Sanders	November 10, 1984
9	459	Thelma Houston, Krystol, Music Video: Lionel Richie	November 17, 1984
10	460	Berlin, The Controllers, Music Video: Chaka Khan	November 24, 1984
11	461	Dan Hartman, Champaign, Music Video: Tina Turner	December 1, 1984
12	462	Herb Alpert, Rodney Saulsberry, Music Video: Billy Ocean	December 8, 1984
13	463	Donna Summer, The Staple Singers, Hal Jackson's Talented Teen Winner	December 15, 1984
14	464	The Temptations, The Fat Boys, Music Video: Madonna	January 5, 1985
15	465	Teena Marie and Ronnie McNeir, Whodini, Music Video: Daryl Hall & John Oates	January 12, 1985
16	466	New Edition, Rebbie Jackson, Music Video: Kool & the Gang	January 26, 1985
17	467	Rockwell, Redd Foxx	February 2, 1985
18	468	The Commodores, Eugene Wilde	February 9, 1985
19	469	Shalamar, Dreamboy, Music Video: Billy Ocean	February 23, 1985
20	470	Bonnie Pointer, Thomas McClary	March 2, 1985
21	471	The Gap Band, Sam Harris, Music Video: Glenn Frey	March 16, 1985
22	472	Johnnie Taylor, Klymaxx, Music Video: Sade	March 23, 1985
23	473	Jesse Johnson, LeVert	March 30, 1985
24	474	Ray, Goodman & Brown, Glenn Jones	April 6, 1985
25	475	Sheena Easton, Mary Jane Girls, Music Video: The Commodores	April 13, 1985
26	476	Don Henley, Whitney Houston	April 20, 1985
27	477	Atlantic Starr, Greg Phillinganes	May 25, 1985
28	478	The Four Tops, Spandau Ballet	June 1, 1985
29	479	Shannon, Alexander O'Neal	June 8, 1985
30	480	Natalie Cole, Ready for the World	June 15, 1985
31	481	Womack & Womack, Pennye Ford, Music Video: Phil Collins	June 22, 1985
32	482	Carrie Lucas, Steve Arrington, Music Video: Harold Faltermeyer	June 29, 1985

== Season 15 (1985–1986) ==
Back to Series overview

The program moved its taping location back to Metromedia Square, from its previous location, at the Charlie Chaplin Studios, where it would stay, for over a year.

Season	Series	Guests	Original airdate
1	483	Go West, Rosie Gaines, Music Video: Aretha Franklin	October 5, 1985
2	484	Sheila E., Five Star, Music Video: Dire Straits	October 12, 1985
3	485	Dennis Edwards, 9.9	October 19, 1985
4	486	Cheryl Lynn, a-ha	October 26, 1985
5	487	Ready for the World, Starpoint, Music Video: Paul Young	November 2, 1985
6	488	Rick Dees, U.T.F.O.	November 9, 1985
7	489	New Edition, Lushus Daim and the Pretty Vain	November 16, 1985
8	490	The System, Durrell Coleman	November 23, 1985
9	491	Cameo, Michael McDonald	November 30, 1985
10	492	Sheena Easton, Bernard Wright	December 7, 1985
11	493	The Thompson Twins, The Jets, Doug E. Fresh	December 14, 1985
12	494	Stephanie Mills, Howard Jones	December 21, 1985
13	495	New Edition, Rosie Gaines	March 8, 1986
14	496	Klymaxx, Jack Wagner, Music Video: Wham!	March 15, 1986
15	497	Five Star, LL Cool J	March 22, 1986
16	498	Janet Jackson, Atlantic Starr, Music Video: Billy Ocean	March 29, 1986
17	499	The Gap Band, Force M.D.'s	April 5, 1986
18	500	Zapp, Meli'sa Morgan, Lisa Lisa and Cult Jam	April 12, 1986
19	501	Johnnie Taylor, Yarbrough & Peoples, Full Force	April 19, 1986
20	502	Culture Club, Cherrelle, Alexander O'Neal	April 26, 1986
21	503	Little Richard, Animotion, Colonel Abrams	May 3, 1986
22	504	Morris Day, Tramaine Hawkins, Eddie "E.T." Towns	May 10, 1986
23	505	Al Green, Evelyn "Champagne" King, Music Video: Sly Fox	May 17, 1986
24	506	Roy Ayers, The Pet Shop Boys	May 24, 1986
25	507	Patti LaBelle & Michael McDonald, Eugene Wilde	May 31, 1986
26	508	Starpoint, The Dramatics, Ebo	June 7, 1986
27	509	The S.O.S. Band, Jermaine Stewart, Juicy	June 14, 1986
28	510	Philip Bailey, The Controllers	June 21, 1986

== Season 16 (1986–1987) ==
Back to Series overview

The show has moved to Hollywood Center Studios, where the show would remain there, through season 22.

Season	Series	Guests	Original airdate
1	511	Midnight Star, Gavin Christopher, Music Video: Michael McDonald	September 20, 1986
2	512	Howard Hewett, Shirley Jones, Music Video: Janet Jackson	September 27, 1986
3	513	Oran "Juice" Jones, The Whitehead Brothers, Special Guests: The Los Angeles Raiders	October 4, 1986
4	514	James Ingram, LeVert, Music Video: Lionel Richie	October 11, 1986
5	515	Jean Carne, Glenn Jones	October 18, 1986
6	516	Run–D.M.C., Genobia Jeter, Special Guest: Dick Anthony Williams	October 25, 1986
7	517	Melba Moore, Freddie Jackson, Beau Williams	November 1, 1986
8	518	Millie Jackson, Whodini	November 8, 1986
9	519	Anita Baker, Gregory Abbott, Special Guest: Troy Beyers	November 15, 1986
10	520	Luther Vandross	November 22, 1986
11	521	Timex Social Club, Krystol, Music Video: Kool and The Gang	November 29, 1986
12	522	Ready for the World, Rebbie Jackson, Music Video: Cameo (band)	December 6, 1986
13	523	Klymaxx, Club Nouveau, Bobby Brown	January 10, 1987
14	524	Al Jarreau, Vesta	January 17, 1987
15	525	Jody Watley, Jeff Lorber featuring Karyn White and Michael Jeffries, Special Guest: Tim Reid	January 24, 1987
16	526	Loose Ends, George Howard	January 31, 1987
17	527	O'Bryan, Beastie Boys, Music Video: Robbie Nevil	March 7, 1987
18	528	James Cleveland, Grace Jones, The Rose Brothers	March 14, 1987
19	529	Rose Royce, Chico DeBarge, Music Video: Jody Watley	March 21, 1987
20	530	Little Richard, Miki Howard	March 28, 1987
21	531	Duran Duran, Stacy Lattisaw	April 4, 1987
22	532	Starpoint, Shirley Murdock	April 11, 1987
23	533	Bunny DeBarge, The System, Georgio	April 18, 1987
24	534	Howard Hewett, Donna Allen, Special Guest: Todd Davis	April 25, 1987
25	535	Nona Hendryx, Robert Brookins, Music Video: Herb Alpert	May 2, 1987
26	536	Stephanie Mills, Surface	May 9, 1987
27	537	Lillo Thomas, Rainy Davis	May 16, 1987
28	538	R. J.'s Latest Arrival, James "D-Train" Williams	May 23, 1987
29	539	Natalie Cole, Robbie Nevil, Millie Scott	May 30, 1987
30	540	Deniece Williams, Lisa Lisa and Cult Jam, Kenny G	June 6, 1987
31	541	The Whispers, 4 By Four, Carrie McDowell	June 13, 1987
32	542	Cheryl Lynn, Lakeside, The Cover Girls	June 20, 1987

== Season 17 (1987–1988) ==
Back to Series overview

Soul Train introduces a new theme song: "TSOP '87" by George Duke (vocalized by Howard Hewett).

Season	Series	Guests	Original airdate
1	543	Jody Watley, LeVert	September 19, 1987
2	544	Shalamar, Alexander O'Neal	September 26, 1987
3	545	Five Star, Babyface, Music Video: Madonna	October 3, 1987
4	546	Atlantic Starr, La La, Giorge Pettus	October 10, 1987
5	547	Anita Pointer, Chico DeBarge, Regina Belle	October 17, 1987
6	548	Barry White, Shanice Wilson	October 24, 1987
7	549	Marlon Jackson, Madame X	October 31, 1987
8	550	DeBarge, Jonathan Butler	November 7, 1987
9	551	Freddie Jackson, Whodini, Lace (American group)	November 14, 1987
10	552	LL Cool J, Meli'sa Morgan, Sting	November 21, 1987
11	553	ABC, Colonel Abrams, Eric B & Rakim	November 28, 1987
12	554	The Jets, Kashif, Public Enemy	December 5, 1987
13	555	Full Force, Angela Winbush, The Controllers	January 9, 1988
14	556	Smokey Robinson, Pretty Poison, classic clip: Smokey Robinson (1982)	January 16, 1988
15	557	Ray Parker Jr., Shanice Wilson, Miles Jaye	January 23, 1988
16	558	The Deele, Georgio, Pebbles, Hal Jackson's Talented Teens Winner	January 30, 1988
17	559	Vanity, Kool Moe Dee, Angela Winbush and Ronald Isley	March 5, 1988
18	560	Lou Rawls, Heavy D and the Boyz, Miki Howard	March 12, 1988
19	561	Peabo Bryson with Regina Belle, Rebbie Jackson, Keith Sweat	March 19, 1988
20	562	Stacy Lattisaw, Salt-N-Pepa, Tony Terry	March 26, 1988
21	563	The Whispers, Miles Jaye, Joyce Sims	April 2, 1988
22	564	Gladys Knight & the Pips, de'Krash	April 9, 1988
23	565	David Ruffin and Eddie Kendricks, Dana Dane, Special Guest: Morris Day	April 16, 1988
24	566	Howard Hewett, Club Nouveau, Michael Cooper	April 23, 1988
25	567	Pebbles, Jermaine Stewart, The Bus Boys	April 30, 1988
26	568	Stephanie Mills, Force MD's	May 7, 1988
27	569	Evelyn "Champagne" King, Brownmark, Sherrick	May 14, 1988
28	570	Hindsight, Mantronix, Pepsi & Shirlie	May 21, 1988
29	571	Teena Marie, Junior, Guy	May 28, 1988
30	572	Gregory Abbott, Siedah Garrett, Al B. Sure	June 4, 1988
31	573	Melba Moore, Narada Michael Walden	June 18, 1988
32	574	New Edition, Johnny Kemp, Bobby Brown	June 25, 1988

== Season 18 (1988–1989) ==
Back to Series overview

Season	Series	Guests	Original airdate
1	575	Thomas Dolby, Vanessa Williams, Tony Terry	September 24, 1988
2	576	The O'Jays, New Kids on the Block	October 1, 1988
3	577	Johnny Mathis, Nia Peeples, Tracie Spencer	October 8, 1988
4	578	New Edition, Paula Abdul	October 15, 1988
5	579	The Commodores, Brenda Russell, The Boys	October 22, 1988
6	580	Deniece Williams, Midnight Star, Kiara	October 29, 1988
7	581	Jeffrey Osborne, The Mac Band, Giant Steps	November 5, 1988
8	582	Freddie Jackson, Ziggy Marley, Karyn White	November 12, 1988
9	583	Ready for the World, Cheryl Pepsii Riley, Billy Always	November 19, 1988
10	584	Sheena Easton, Howard Huntsberry, Sweet Obsession	November 26, 1988
11	585	Keith Sweat, Surface, EPMD	December 3, 1988
12	586	LeVert, James "D-Train" Williams, Special Guest: Gregory Hines	December 10, 1988
13	587	The Boys, Breathe, Desiree Coleman	January 14, 1989
14	588	Chaka Khan Tribute/ Fishbone, Cameo: Arsenio Hall	January 21, 1989
15	589	George Benson, Guy, Cameo: Keenen Ivory Wayans	January 28, 1989
16	590	Starpoint, Cherrelle, Robert Brookins & Stephanie Mills	February 4, 1989
17	591	El DeBarge, Vesta Williams, Troop	March 11, 1989
18	592	Midnight Star, Gerald Alston, Kiara & Shanice Wilson	March 18, 1989
19	593	Betty Wright, K-9 Posse, Today	March 25, 1989
20	594	George Duke, Tony! Toni! Tone!, Marcus Lewis	April 1, 1989
21	595	Milli Vanilli, Was (Not Was), Z-Looke	April 8, 1989
22	596	Skyy, Desiree Coleman, Apollonia	April 15, 1989
23	597	Ashford & Simpson, Rob Base & DJ E-Z Rock, Johnny Kemp	April 22, 1989
24	598	Georgio, The Bar-Kays, Tone Loc	April 29, 1989
25	599	E.U., Grady Harrell, Joyce "Fenderella" Irby with Doug E. Fresh	May 6, 1989
26	600	Third World, Donna Allen	May 13, 1989
27	601	The Manhattan Transfer, René Moore, Lateasha	May 20, 1989
28	602	Wendy & Lisa, Charlie Singleton	May 27, 1989
29	603	Robert Palmer, Atlantic Starr, Stephanie Mills	June 3, 1989
30	604	Tribute to Patti LaBelle, Eugene Wilde	June 10, 1989
31	605	James Ingram, Hiroshima, MC Hammer	June 17, 1989
32	606	Lisa Lisa & Cult Jam, June Pointer, Christopher Max	June 24, 1989

== Season 19 (1989–1990) ==
Back to Series overview

A remixed version of the theme song, "TSOP '89", is introduced in this season.

Season	Series	Guests	Original airdate
1	607	Debbie Allen, Heavy D & the Boyz, Music Video: Eddie Murphy	September 23, 1989
2	608	Full Force, Chuckii Booker, Music Video: Jonathan Butler	September 30, 1989
3	609	James Ingram, Exposé, Music Video: Paula Abdul	October 7, 1989
4	610	Regina Belle, Alyson Williams, After 7	October 14, 1989
5	611	Sharon Bryant, Michael Bolton, Young M.C.	October 21, 1989
6	612	Kool & the Gang, David Peaston, Music Video: Prince	October 28, 1989
7	613	Stephanie Mills, Michael Cooper, The Good Girls	November 4, 1989
8	614	BeBe & CeCe Winans, Christopher Williams, Music Video: James Ingram	November 11, 1989
9	615	Barry White, Sybil	November 18, 1989
10	616	Billy Ocean, Kashif, Stacy Lattisaw	November 25, 1989
11	617	Cheryl Lynn, Entouch, Wrecks-N-Effect	December 2, 1989
12	618	Jermaine Jackson, Finest Hour, D'Atra Hicks	December 9, 1989
13	619	Soul II Soul, The Main Ingredient, Foster and McElroy	January 13, 1990
14	620	The O'Jays, Troop, Tyler Collins	January 20, 1990
15	621	The Temptations, Beastie Boys, Michael Jeffries, Karyn White	January 27, 1990
16	622	Calloway, Pieces of a Dream, Eric Gable	March 3, 1990
17	623	Maze featuring Frankie Beverly, Big Daddy Kane, Body	March 10, 1990
18	624	The Winans, Miki Howard, Jeff Redd	March 17, 1990
19	625	The Jets, George Howard, Michel'le	March 24, 1990
20	626	Angela Winbush, David Peaston, Seduction	March 31, 1990
21	627	Jody Watley, The Newtrons, Music Video: Janet Jackson	April 7, 1990
22	628	Randy Crawford, Bell Biv Devoe, Music Video: Bobby Brown	April 14, 1990
23	629	Regina Belle, Timmy Gatling, Music Video: Jody Watley	April 21, 1990
24	630	Stacy Lattisaw, Sherman Hemsley, KYZE	April 28, 1990
25	631	Johnny Gill, Stacey & Kimiko, The Jamaica Boys	May 5, 1990
26	632	Jeffrey Daniel, Brat Pack, Music Video: Maze featuring Frankie Beverly	May 12, 1990
27	633	Tyler Collins, En Vogue, Music Video: Luther Vandross	May 19, 1990
28	634	Klymaxx, Def Con 4, Misa	May 26, 1990
29	635	Kid 'n Play, Perfect Gentlemen, Music Video: Madonna	June 2, 1990
30	636	The Gap Band, The Superiors, Domino Theory	June 9, 1990
31	637	The Pointer Sisters, Mantronix, Music Video: MC Hammer	June 16, 1990
32	638	The Good Girls, Today, The U Krew	June 23, 1990

== Season 20 (1990–1991) ==
Back to Series overview

Season	Series	Guests	Original airdate
1	639.	The Time, James "J.T." Taylor, Kwamé	September 22, 1990
2	640.	Lalah Hathaway, Tevin Campbell, Tony! Toni! Tone!	September 29, 1990
3	641.	Force MD's, Lakeside, Mellow Man Ace	October 6, 1990
4	642.	Body, The Afros, Midnight Star	October 13, 1990
5	643.	Quincy Jones Tribute featuring Tevin Campbell, Siedah Garrett, Al B. Sure, The Winans, El DeBarge, Valerie Mayo, Big Daddy Kane, Melle Mel, Kool Moe Dee & Quincy Jones	October 20, 1990
6	644.	D-Nice, Al B. Sure, Black Box, Music Video: Johnny Gill	October 27, 1990
7	645.	The Whispers, The Boys, Terry Steele	November 3, 1990
8	646.	Salt-N-Pepa, The Mac Band, Brenda Russell	November 10, 1990
9	647.	Snap!, E.U., Jasmine Guy	November 17, 1990
10	648.	Guy, Thelma Houston	November 24, 1990
11	649.	Father MC, LeVert, Music Video: Jasmine Guy	December 1, 1990
12	650.	Z-Looke, Maxi Priest, Music Video: Whitney Houston	December 8, 1990
13	651.	Ralph Tresvant, Samuelle	January 12, 1991
14	652.	Teena Marie, LL Cool J, The Rude Boys	January 19, 1991
15	653.	Loose Ends, Jeffrey Osborne, Music Video: Vanilla Ice	January 26, 1991
16	654.	Freddie Jackson, Tracie Spencer, EPMD	February 2, 1991
17	655.	Bernadette Cooper, Big Daddy Kane, Music Video: Al B. Sure!	February 9, 1991
18	656.	Pebbles, Hi-Five, Music Video: Bell Biv DeVoe	February 16, 1991
19	657.	Howard Hewett, Monie Love, Another Bad Creation	February 23, 1991
20	658.	Today, Joey B. Ellis & Tynetta Hare, Music Video: Big Daddy Kane with Barry White	March 2, 1991
21	659.	Johnny Gill, Gerald Alston, MC Trouble	March 9, 1991
22	660.	Run D.M.C., Ice-T, Oleta Adams	March 16, 1991
23	661.	The O'Jays, Chubb Rock, Music Video: Jasmine Guy	March 23, 1991
24	662.	Keith Sweat, Shawn Christopher, Brand Nubian	March 30, 1991
25	663.	Sheena Easton, Altitude, Nikki D	May 4, 1991
26	664.	Al B. Sure!, K-9 Posse, Color Me Badd	May 11, 1991
27	665.	Christopher Williams, Five Star, Tara Kemp	May 18, 1991
28	666.	Surface, Keith Washington, Victoria Wilson-James	May 25, 1991
29	667.	Boyz II Men, Ex-Girlfriend, Omar Chandler, Cameos: Michael Bivins, Another Bad Creation,Lucien "Bowlegged Lou" George Jr., “Paul Anthony” George	June 1, 1991
30	668.	Junior, Cheryl Pepsii Riley, Ed O.G. & Da Bulldogs	June 8, 1991
31	669.	Damian Dame, Jodeci, Lisa Fischer	June 15, 1991
32	670.	B Angie B, Tony Terry, Small Change	June 22, 1991

== Season 21 (1991–1992) ==
Back to Series overview

Season	Series	Guests	Original airdate
1	671.	Tribute to Stevie Wonder	September 21, 1991
2	672.	C + C Music Factory, James "J.T." Taylor, Music Video: Vanessa Williams	September 28, 1991
3	673.	Tribute to Gladys Knight, Riff	October 5, 1991
4	674.	Color Me Badd, Ready for the World, Music Video: Karyn White	October 12, 1991
5	675.	DJ Jazzy Jeff & The Fresh Prince, Brand New Heavies, Music Video: Sounds of Blackness	October 19, 1991
6	676.	BeBe & CeCe Winans, Young MC, Chris Pittman	October 26, 1991
7	677.	Lenny Kravitz, Oaktown's 3-5-7, Music Video: Luther Vandross	November 2, 1991
8	678.	Lisa Lisa & Cult Jam, Pretty in Pink, Chris Walker	November 9, 1991
9	679.	Kid n' Play, Tony! Toni! Tone!, Ralph Tresvant, Wreckx-N-Effect with Big Bub	November 16, 1991
10	680.	Keith Washington, The S.O.S. Band, F.S. Effect	November 23, 1991
11	681.	Big Daddy Kane, Atlantic Starr, Music Video: Bell Biv Devoe	November 30, 1991
12	682.	Ziggy Marley & the Melody Makers, Tevin Campbell, Public Enemy	December 7, 1991
13	683.	Patti LaBelle, Chubb Rock	January 11, 1992
14	684.	Vanessa Williams, Shanice Wilson, Jodeci	January 18, 1992
15	685.	Jody Watley, Vesta	January 25, 1992
16	686.	Karyn White, Eric Gable, Nice & Smooth	February 1, 1992
17	687.	Barry White with Isaac Hayes, Vickie Winans with Marvin Winans	February 8, 1992
18	688.	Mariah Carey, Sounds of Blackness, Music Video: MC Hammer	February 15, 1992
19	689.	Peabo Bryson, MC Lyte, Music Video: Vanessa Williams	February 22, 1992
20	690.	Gerald Levert with Eddie Levert, Phyllis Hyman, Music Video: Color Me Badd	February 29, 1992
21	691.	Naughty by Nature, Glenn Jones, Hen-Gee & Evil E	March 7, 1992
22	692.	Atlantic Starr, UMC's, Aaron Hall	March 14, 1992
23	693.	Nia Peeples, Eric B. & Rakim, Music Video: Color Me Badd	March 21, 1992
24	694.	Tony Terry, Patti Austin, D-Nice	March 28, 1992
25	695.	Chaka Khan, Joe Public, Music Video: Keith Sweat featuring LL Cool J	May 2, 1992
26	696.	El DeBarge with Chante Moore, Kris Kross, Lisa Taylor	May 9, 1992
27	697.	Meli'sa Morgan, Chris Walker, Little Shawn	May 16, 1992
28	698.	Kathy Sledge, Mint Condition, KCM	May 23, 1992
29	699.	TLC, Eugene Wilde, Doug E. Fresh	May 30, 1992
30	700.	Good 2 go, Brotherhood Creed, Music Video: En Vogue	June 6, 1992
31	701.	The Boys, Sue Ann Carwell, Das Efx	June 13, 1992
32	702.	Cherrelle, Men at Large, Music Video: Prince	June 20, 1992

== Season 22 (1992–1993) ==
Back to Series overview

Season 22 is Don Cornelius's last season as host.

Season	Series	Guests	Original airdate
1	703.	Al B. Sure!, Tyler Collins, Father MC	26 September 1992
2	704.	Al Jarreau, Mary J. Blige, Pete Rock & CL Smooth	3 October 1992
3	705.	CeCe Peniston, After 7, Gary Brown, Everette Harp	10 October 1992
4	706.	Charlie Wilson, Rachelle Ferrell, Me Phi Me	17 October 1992
5	707.	Freddie Jackson, Miki Howard, Da Youngsta's	24 October 1992
6	708.	Morris Day, Third World, The Cover Girls	31 October 1992
7	709.	George Duke, Hi-Five, Yo-Yo	7 November 1992
8	710.	Big Bub, EPMD, The Voices	14 November 1992
9	711.	Bobby Brown, Wreckx-N-Effect	21 November 1992
10	712.	Christopher Williams, Chanté Moore, Prince Markie Dee & the Soul Convention	28 November 1992
11	713.	Chuckii Booker, Nona Gaye, Arrested Development, Lester Barrie	5 December 1992
12	714.	Howard Hewett, Jade, Tamrock, Trey Lorenz	12 December 1992
13	715.	Keith Sweat with Jacci McGhee and Gerald Levert, Lo-Key	16 January 1993
14	716.	Shanice Wilson, Simple Pleasure, T.N.G	23 January 1993
15	717.	Full Force, Jacci McGhee, Aries Spears	30 January 1993
16	718.	Toni Braxton, Silk, Portrait	6 February 1993
17	719.	R. Kelly & Public Announcement, Monie Love, Music Video: Prince	13 February 1993
18	720.	Kris Kross, Brian McKnight, Stacey McClain	20 February 1993
19	721.	Mad Cobra, Immature, SWV	27 February 1993
20	722.	Tisha Campbell, Lorenzo Smith, Young Black Teenagers	6 March 1993
21	723.	Heavy D, Force One Network, P.O.V., Positive K	13 March 1993
22	724.	Naughty by Nature, Miki Howard, Music Video: Whitney Houston	20 March 1993
23	725.	Regina Belle, Lords of the Underground, Peabo Bryson	27 March 1993
24	726.	Troop, The Good Girls, Prince Markie Dee & the Soul Convention	3 April 1993
25	727.	LL Cool J, Shai, Mystro Clark	8 May 1993
26	728.	Run-DMC, Richard Osborne	15 May 1993
27	729.	LeVert, Michael Cooper, T.C.F.	22 May 1993
28	730.	AZ-1, Tene Williams, Redman	29 May 1993
29	731.	Walter Scott & Scotty Scott, Paperboy, Kirk Whalum	5 June 1993
30	732.	Chanté Moore, Intro, Gumbo	12 June 1993
31	733.	PM Dawn, Blackstreet, U.N.V.	19 June 1993
32	734.	The Commodores, II D Extreme, Mahogany Blue	26 June 1993

== Season 23 (1993–1994) ==
Back to Series overview

This season introduced a new theme song, "Soul Train '93 (Know You Like to Dance)", performed by the rap group Naughty by Nature, Chanté Moore, Wallace "Scotty" and Walter Scott of The Whispers, and saxophonist Everette Harp. The new opening animation introduces a revised, afrocentric-inspired Soul Train logo, and features video clips of performances from the show's first 22 seasons playing in floating video boxes in the background. The show is also moved to Paramount Studios, where the show would be filmed right up to the final season. Also for the next four years, the show used a revolving guest-host format.

Season	Series	Host	Guests	Original airdate
1	735	Kim Wayans	Keith Washington, H-Town, Xscape	October 23, 1993
2	736	T. K. Carter	Maze featuring Frankie Beverly, Mica Paris, MC Lyte	October 30, 1993
3	737	Aries Spears	Bell Biv DeVoe, Freedom Williams, Zhane	November 6, 1993
4	738	Ajai Sanders	Aaron Hall, Raven-Symoné, Tag Team	November 13, 1993
5	739	Steve White	Teddy Pendergrass, II D Extreme, Music Video: Meshell Ndegeocello	November 20, 1993
6	740	Tyra Banks	James "J.T." Taylor, Meshell Ndegeocello, Usher	November 27, 1993
7	741	Mystro Clark	Tevin Campbell, Angie & Debbie, Das Efx	December 4, 1993
8	742	T'Keyah Crystal Keymáh	Jody Watley, Onyx, Erick Sermon	December 11, 1993
9	743	Melanie Comarcho	Color Me Badd, Snoop Doggy Dogg, Domino	December 18, 1993
10	744	John Henton	LL Cool J, Kris Kross, Vince Patterson (Comedian)	December 25, 1993
11	745	Darrel Heath	Queen Latifah, D.R.S., Souls of Mischief	January 1, 1994
12	746	Tisha Campbell	De La Soul, Riff, Coming of Age	January 8, 1994
13	747	Mario Van Peebles	Mavis Staples, Funky Poets	January 15, 1994
14	748	Lewis Dix	Mint Condition, K-7, UMC's	January 22, 1994
15	749	Karyn Parsons	Zhane, Another Bad Creation, Music Video: Salt N Pepa	January 29, 1994
16	750	A.J. Jamal	Chris Walker, 7669, Me 2 U	February 5, 1994
17	751	Tichina Arnold	Xscape, Gerald Albright, Music Video: Luther Vandross	February 12, 1994
18	752	John Witherspoon	Michael McDonald, Jeru the Damaja, Main Source	February 19, 1994
19	753	Sheryl Lee Ralph	Joe, Chantay Savage, Music Video: Toni Braxton	February 26, 1994
20	754	Lester Barrie	Lisette Melendez, Intro, Gangstarr	March 5, 1994
21	755	Alfonso Ribeiro	R. Kelly, Gabrielle, Music Video: Jody Watley	March 12, 1994
22	756	Paula Jai Parker	CeCe Peniston, Outkast, Tashan	March 19, 1994
23	757	Adam Jeffries	Kid 'N Play, Damion Hall	March 26, 1994
24	758	George Wallace	Ralph Tresvant, Eric Gable, Justin Warfield	April 2, 1994
25	759	Holly Robinson	Prince, For Lovers Only	May 7, 1994
26	760	Alex Thomas	Angela Winbush, Glenn Jones, Music Video: Prince	May 14, 1994
27	761	Byron Allen	Atlantic Starr, Patra, DBG'Z	May 21, 1994
28	762	Thea Vidale	Blackgirl, Company, Sudden Change	May 28, 1994
29	763	Morris Chestnut	Patti LaBelle, Sounds of Blackness, Simple E	June 4, 1994
30	764	Jackée Harry	Lalah Hathaway, Melvin Riley, Immature	June 11, 1994
31	765	Kristoff St. John	Philip Bailey, For Real, Music Video: Keith Sweat featuring Left Eye	June 18, 1994
32	766	Ella Joyce	Lisa Lisa, Smooth Sylk, Masta Ace Inc.	June 25, 1994

== Season 24 (1994–1995) ==
Back to Series overview

Season	Series	Host	Guests	Original airdate
1	767	Robert Townsend	Blackstreet, Take 6, The Conscious Daughters	September 24, 1994
2	768	Telma Hopkins	Tony! Toni! Tone!, Jonathan Butler, Lady of Rage	October 1, 1994
3	769	Tyra Banks	Public Enemy, El DeBarge, Brownstone	October 8, 1994
4	770	Garcelle Beauvais	Teena Marie, Warren G, N II U	October 15, 1994
5	771	George Wallace	Karyn White, BeBe & CeCe Winans, London Jones	October 22, 1994
6	772	Karen Alexander	Gerald Levert, Zhane, Brandy	October 29, 1994
7	773	Jonelle Allen	Barry White, Shanice Wilson, The Boogiemonsters	November 5, 1994
8	774	Thyme Lewis	Aaron Hall, Ex-Girlfriend, Music Video: Anita Baker	November 12, 1994
9	775	Joseph Marcell	Boyz II Men, Casserine, Music Video: Patti LaBelle	November 19, 1994
10	776	Roshumba Williams	Angela Winbush, The Whitehead Brothers, Pete Rock & CL Smooth	November 26, 1994
11	777	Melonee Rodgers	Tony Terry, Blackgirl, Craig Mack	December 3, 1994
12	778	T.C. Carson	Rachelle Ferrell, A Few Good Men, Ill Al Skratch with Brian McKnight	December 10, 1994
13	779	Sinbad	Cameo, Men at Large, Method Man	January 14, 1995
14	780	Lana Ogilvie	Mary J. Blige, Lords of the Underground, Ebony Vibe Everlasting	January 21, 1995
15	781	Veronica Webb	Chanté Moore, Immature, Subway	January 28, 1995
16	782	Beverly Peele	Howard Hewett, H-Town, Da Brat	February 4, 1995
17	783	Gail O'Neill	69 Boyz, Tanya Blount, Y.N. Vee	February 11, 1995
18	784	Dorien Wilson	All-4-One, Hiroshima, Redman	February 18, 1995
19	785	Cynthia Bailey	BeBe & CeCe Winans, RajaNee, Usher	February 25, 1995
20	786	Michelle Griffin	Digable Planets, Soul 4 Real, Trisha Covington	March 4, 1995
21	787	Victoria Rowell	George Duke, Mint Condition, Fu-Schnickens	March 11, 1995
22	788	T. K. Carter	The Whispers, Lo-Key, Coolio	March 18, 1995
23	789	Leah Gregory	Blackstreet, Miss Jones, Vicious	March 25, 1995
24	790	Anna Getaneth	Jade, Des'ree, Quo	April 1, 1995
25	791	Amy Hunter	Freddie Jackson, Brownstone, Kut Klose	May 6, 1995
26	792	Steve Harvey	Da Brat, Rottin Razkals, Diana King	May 13, 1995
27	793	Kellie Shanygne Williams	Portrait, Jesse, Music Video: Branford Marsalis	May 20, 1995
28	794	Regina Monte	Branford Marsalis, Fabu, Changing Faces, Keith Murray	May 27, 1995
29	795	Waris Dirie	Donna Summer, Shabba Ranks, Monica	June 3, 1995
30	796	Michael Michele	Naughty by Nature, Brian McKnight, E-40	June 10, 1995
31	797	Georgianna Robertson	Stevie Wonder, Jody Watley, Vertical Hold	June 17, 1995
32	798	Karla Otis	Brandy, Sean Levert, Heather B	June 24, 1995

== Season 25 (1995–1996) ==
Back to Series overview

Season	Series	Host	Guests	Original airdate
1	799	Mark Curry	CeCe Winans, Ini Kamoze, Mokenstef	September 23, 1995
2	800	Tatyana Ali	KRS-One, Deborah Cox, Shaggy	September 30, 1995
3	801	Kenya Moore	Jon B, Soultry, Faith Evans, Luniz	October 7, 1995
4	802	Senait Ashenafi	Aaron Hall, D'Angelo, Solo	October 14, 1995
5	803	Tisha Campbell	All-4-One, Vybe, The Twinz	October 21, 1995
6	804	Mari Morrow	Michael Bolton, Anointed, AZ featuring Miss Jones	October 28, 1995
7	805	Stacey Dash	Shai, Maysa Leak, Mystikal	November 4, 1995
8	806	Shemar Moore	Brandy, A Few Good Men, Groove Theory	November 11, 1995
9	807	Darnell Williams	After 7, Intro, 3T	December 16, 1995
10	808	Reagan Gomez-Preston	Immature, Terry Ellis, Asante	December 23, 1995
11	809	Renée Jones	Aaron Neville, Silk, Jason Weaver	December 30, 1995
12	810	Vivica A. Fox	MC Hammer, Skillz	January 6, 1996
13	811	Joseph C. Phillips	Brian McKnight, Goodie Mobb, Barrio Boyzz	January 13, 1996
14	812	Lark Voorhies	LL Cool J, Pure Soul, Monifah	January 20, 1996
15	813	Jeffrey Anderson Gunther	Gerald Levert & Eddie Levert, Monica, Tamia	January 27, 1996
16	814	Stephanie Roberts	Jodeci, Faith Evans, Jesse & Trina	February 3, 1996
17	815	James Reynolds	Tha Dogg Pound with Snoop Doggy Dogg & Michel'le, J'Son, Total	February 10, 1996
18	816	Carl Anthony Payne II	Deborah Cox, Speech, Somethin' for the People	February 17, 1996
19	817	Dorien Wilson	PM Dawn, Erick Sermon with Aaron Hall, Keith Murray & Redman, LBC Crew	February 24, 1996
20	818	Sheryl Lee Ralph	Tony Rich, Boyz of Paradise, Suga"	March 2, 1996
21	819	Thomas Mikal Ford	H-Town with Shirley Murdock, Solo, Jesse Powell	March 9, 1996
22	820	Arthel Neville	Kris Kross with Da Brat, Jermaine Dupri & Mr. Black, Chantay Savage, Earth Gyrlz	March 16, 1996
23	821	Brian Austin Green	The Winans, 3T, Yvette Michelle	March 23, 1996
24	822	Tia Mowry and Tamera Mowry	D'Angelo, Patra with Aaron Hall, Nonchalant	March 30, 1996
25	823	Michelle Thomas	Ladae! featuring Al B. Sure!, II D Extreme, Puff Johnson, 2Pac	May 4, 1996
26	824	Clarence Gilyard Jr.	Busta Rhymes featuring Zhané, Horace Brown, Art N'Soul	May 13, 1996
27	825	Anne-Marie Johnson	Men of Vizion, Monifah featuring AZ, Mr. X	May 18, 1996
28	826	Lisa Canning	Brian Austin Green, Silk, Master P featuring Silkk the Shocker	May 25, 1996
29	827	Khandi Alexander	Shai, Kenny Lattimore, Sa-Deuce	June 1, 1996
30	828	Lanai Chapman	The Whitehead Brothers, Jon B, Mista	June 8, 1996
31	829	Kristoff St. John	SWV, Donell Jones, MC Lyte	June 15, 1996
32	830	Shemar Moore	Kirk Franklin & the Family, Mona Lisa, Quindon Tarver	June 22, 1996

== Season 26 (1996–1997) ==
Back to Series overview

Season	Series	Host	Guests	Original airdate
1	831	Darius McCrary	Mint Condition, For Real, Case featuring Foxy Brown, Southside B.O.I.Z.	October 26, 1996
2	832	Aisha Henderson	Montell Jordan, Dru Hill, 702	November 2, 1996
3	833	Fawn Reed	The Isley Brothers, Tevin Campbell	November 9, 1996
4	834	Jamie Foxx	Blackstreet, Aaliyah, The Braxtons	November 16, 1996
5	835	Christopher B. Duncan	Keith Sweat, Tony! Toni! Tone!, Ginuwine	November 23, 1996
6	836	Netfa Perry	Take 6, Alfonzo Hunter, 112	November 30, 1996
7	837	Tasha Smith	Immature, Az Yet, Shades	December 7, 1996
8	838	Tracy Vilar	Da Brat featuring Jermaine Dupri, Mona Lisa, Quindon Tarver	December 14, 1996
9	839	Dorian Gregory	CeCe Peniston, Soul for Real, A+	December 21, 1996
10	840	Maria Costa	Eric Benet, Dru Hill, Wild Orchid	December 28, 1996
11	841	Shaun Baker	Donell Jones, Yo-Yo, Gina Thompson	January 4, 1997
12	842	Shawn Michael Howard	Deborah Cox, Westside Connection, Day Ta Day	January 11, 1997
13	843	Dorien Wilson	Maxwell, II D Extreme, Goodfellas	January 18, 1997
14	844	Maia Campbell	Johnny Gill, Monica, Premiere	January 25, 1997
15	845	Donald Faison	Chaka Khan, Kenny Lattimore	February 1, 1997
16	846	Lamont Bentley	Roger Troutman & Zapp, Rashaan Patterson, Outkast	February 8, 1997
17	847	Vivica A. Fox	Zhané, Horace Brown, Jeru the Damaja	February 15, 1997
18	848	Shari Headley	Mint Condition, Erykah Badu, Quad City D.J.'s	February 22, 1997
19	849	Terrence Dashon Howard	LeVert, Ray J, Lil' Kim	March 1, 1997
20	850	John Salley	Tony! Toni! Tone!, Montell Jordan, A Tribe Called Quest, Music Video: Heavy D, "Ms. Soul Train" & "Mr. Soul Train" Ford/AT&T Viewer Sweepstakes - preliminary	March 8, 1997
21	851	David Michael	MC Lyte featuring Missy "Misdemeanor" Elliott, Hiroshima, Twice, Lil' Bud and Tizone	March 15, 1997
22	852	Michelle Thomas	Heavy D, Monifah, Tha Truth	March 22, 1997
23	853	Tamala Jones	Snoop Doggy Dogg, Nate Dogg, Ginuwine, Dean Phil! and Al B. Sure!	March 29, 1997
24	854	Traci Bingham	Brownstone, Yvette Michelle, Next Levels, "Ms. Soul Train" & "Mr. Soul Train" Ford/AT&T Viewer Sweepstakes-Finals	April 5, 1997
25	855	Thomas Mikal Ford	Day Ta Day, Goodfellas, Music Video: Mary J. Blige	April 12, 1997
26	856	T'Keyah Keymáh	Dru Hill, Zakiya, Gyrl	April 19, 1997
27	857	Cedric the Entertainer	Warren G, 702, Nu Flavor	April 26, 1997
28	858	Malik Yoba	Maxwell, Tasha Holiday, Melky & Day, "Ms. Soul Train" & "Mr. Soul Train" Ford/AT&T Viewer Sweepstakes Grand Prize Presentation	May 3, 1997
29	859	Countess Vaughn	Sounds of Blackness, Joose, Dionne Farris, Master P featuring Fiend, Silkk the Shocker, Mia X & Mystikal	May 10, 1997
30	860	Aaron Seville	Joe, Billy Lawrence, Phajja	May 17, 1997
31	861	Rhona Bennett	Brand New Heavies, Allure, Rome, Bone Thugs-n-Harmony	May 24, 1997

== Season 27 (1997–1998) ==
Back to Series overview

The revolving guest-host format ends, and Mystro Clark takes over as permanent host at this point.

Season	Series	Guests	Original airdate
1	862.	Immature, K-Ball, ST Library: Whitney Houston	20 September 1997
2	863.	SWV, Az Yet (live performance), Next	27 September 1997
3	864.	Rome, Robyn, Sam Salter	4 October 1997
4	865.	Brian McKnight, Davina, ST Library: Bobby Brown	11 October 1997
5	866.	Wyclef with Destiny's Child, Chico DeBarge, Taral Hicks	18 October 1997
6	867.	Jon B, Somethin' for the People, Nadanuf featuring Kurtis Blow	25 October 1997
7	868.	Brownstone, Usher, Queen Pen featuring Teddy Riley	1 November 1997
8	869.	K-Ci & JoJo, 98 Degrees, Myron	8 November 1997
9	870.	Aaron Neville, Busta Rhymes, MQ3	15 November 1997
10	871.	Immature with Bizzy Bone, Sounds of Blackness with Roger Troutman, Mase	22 November 1997
11	872.	Backstreet Boys, Simone Hines, Uncle Sam	29 November 1997
12	873.	Eric Benet, Ol' Skool	6 December 1997
13	874.	Missy "Misdemeanor" Elliott, Jagged Edge, Big Bub	10 January 1998
14	875.	Jody Watley, Mack 10 featuring Ice Cube & Snoop Doggy Dogg, Sam Salter	17 January 1998
15	876.	H-Town, Kimberly Scott, Mic Geronimo	24 January 1998
16	877.	Joe, Born Jamericans, Verónica	31 January 1998
17	878.	LL Cool J, Dru Hill, Billy Porter	7 February 1998
18	879.	The Whispers, Ginuwine, Public Announcement	14 February 1998
19	880.	Bebe Winans, Ol' Skool with Xscape, Ice Cube	21 February 1998
20	881.	Rome, God's Property, K.P. & Envyi	28 February 1998
21	882.	Playa, Mýa featuring Sisqó, Cece Winans	4 April 1998
22	883.	Tamia, Elusion, Luke	11 April 1998
23	884.	Keith Washington, Destiny's Child, Outta Order	18 April 1998
24	885.	Robyn, Next, Rufus Blaq	25 April 1998
25	886.	Jon B, Militia, Tami Hert	2 May 1998
26	887.	Rebbie Jackson, Ali, Kurupt	9 May 1998
27	888.	Big Daddy Kane, Xscape, Sylke-E Fyne	16 May 1998
28	889.	Daz Dillinger, Nutta Butta featuring Teddy Riley and Anonymous, David Miller, Angel Grant	23 May 1998
29	890.	Color Me Badd, Davina, Charli Baltimore with Cam'ron	30 May 1998
30	891.	Will Downing, Kelly Price, Christión, Imajin	6 June 1998
31	892.	Chico DeBarge, Silk 130, Joe	13 June 1998
32	893.	Gerald Levert, Yo-Yo, Mo Thugs Family, Tami Davis	20 June 1998

== Season 28 (1998–1999) ==
Back to Series overview

Season	Series	Guests	Original airdate
1	894.	Nate Dogg featuring Warren G, Montell Jordan, Terrance Quaites	19 September 1998
2	895.	Kenny Lattimore, Monifah, Nicole Wray	26 September 1998
3	896.	Regina Belle, Jesse Powell, Tatyana Ali	3 October 1998
4	897.	Deborah Cox, Tyrese, Voices of Theory	10 October 1998
5	898.	Shaquille O'Neal, Kelly Price with Ronald Isley & R. Kelly, Levi Little	17 October 1998
6	899.	The Temptations, 69 Boyz, The Black Eyed Peas, Andrea Martin	24 October 1998
7	900.	Tamia, Link, Pee Wee's Mag 7	31 October 1998
8	901.	Next, MC Lyte featuring Gina Thompson, Sparkle	7 November 1998
9	902.	Jermaine Dupri featuring Slick Rick, Lord Tariq & Peter Gunz, Nicole Renee	14 November 1998
10	903.	112, Willie Max featuring Raphael Saadiq, Jerome	21 November 1998
11	904.	Kurupt, Divine, A+	28 November 1998
12	905.	Bizzy Bone, Tyrese, 4Kast	5 December 1998
13	906.	Terrance Quaites, Uncle Sam	9 January 1999
14	907.	Jon B, Before Dark	16 January 1999
15	908.	Kenny Lattimore, Public Announcement, Shae Jones	23 January 1999
16	909.	Total, Reel Tight	30 January 1999
17	910.	Tevin Campbell, Kelly Price, 3rd Storee	6 February 1999
18	911.	Faith Evans, Shanice	13 February 1999
19	912.	Dru Hill, Deborah Cox	20 February 1999
20	913.	Monica, Outkast, Marc Dorsey	27 February 1999
21	914.	Mýa, Silk, Cool Breeze featuring Goodie Mob & Outkast	6 March 1999
22	915.	Krayzie Bone, Men of Vizion, Cherokee	13 March 1999
23	916.	DJ Quik featuring El DeBarge, 2nd II None, and Suga Free, Sparkle, Dave Hollister	20 March 1999
24	917.	Ginuwine, Imajin, Baby DC featuring Imajin	27 March 1999
25	918.	Chante Moore, Blaque, MC Eiht	1 May 1999
26	919.	Nas, Chantay Savage, Donell Jones	8 May 1999
27	920.	Divine, Shae Jones, Harlem World	15 May 1999
28	921.	Tyrese, Trina & Tamera, JT Money	22 May 1999
29	922.	Naughty By Nature, Jesse Powell, Les Nubians	29 May 1999
30	923.	C-Note, Before Dark, Juvenile	5 June 1999
31	924.	Case, Liberty City	12 June 1999
32	925.	Eric Benet, Marc Dorsey, TWDY	19 June 1999

== Season 29 (1999–2000) ==
Back to Series overview

The 13th episode of this season marked the first new episode to air with a major change: Shemar Moore takes over as host, replacing Mystro Clark. Along with Moore's debut, the program gets a new theme: "TSOP 2000" by Dr. Freeze, Samson, and Everette Harp.

Season	Series	Guests	Original airdate
1	926.	Kevon Edmonds, Grenique, Cha Cha	18 September 1999
2	927.	Tracie Spencer, Marc Nelson, CJ Mac featuring Mack 10 and Terrance Quaites	25 September 1999
3	928.	Ginuwine, 702, Profyle	2 October 1999
4	929.	Destiny's Child, Christina Aguilera, Coko	9 October 1999
5	930.	Silk, Eve, Lost Boyz	16 October 1999
6	931.	Brian McKnight, IMx, Youngbloodz	23 October 1999
7	932.	Chico DeBarge, 112, Trin-I-Tee 5:7	30 October 1999
8	933.	DMX, Mint Condition, Keesha	6 November 1999
9	934.	Jagged Edge, Donell Jones, Children of the Ghetto	13 November 1999
10	935.	Yolanda Adams, Kurupt, Ideal	20 November 1999
11	936.	Goodie Mob, Shandozia, Sole featuring JT Money	27 November 1999
12	937.	Olu, Angie Stone, Humanwreck	4 December 1999
13	938.	Q-Tip, Catero, 2nd II None	8 January 2000
14	939.	Blaque, Rome, Eve	15 January 2000
15	940.	Dave Hollister, Before Dark, Vega	22 January 2000
16	941.	Eric Benet, Sounds of Blackness, Amyth	29 January 2000
17	942.	Kevon Edmonds, Ideal, B.G.	5 February 2000
18	943.	Snoop Dogg presents Tha Eastsidaz, Sisqó, Sammie	12 February 2000
19	944.	Goodie Mob, Beverly, Lil' Wayne	19 February 2000
20	945.	Ginuwine, Juvenile, Amel Larrieux	26 February 2000
21	946.	Montell Jordan, The Roots, Lil' Zane	4 March 2000
22	947.	Bone Thugs N Harmony, Jaze, F.A.T.E.	11 March 2000
23	948.	Gerald Levert, N-Toon, Blaxuede	18 March 2000
24	949.	IMx, BB Jay, Rah Digga	25 March 2000
25	950.	Product G & B, Lucy Pearl, The Temptations	29 April 2000
26	951.	Dwayne Wiggins, Mary Mary, Strings	6 May 2000
27	952.	Tracie Spencer, Avant, Erick Onasis featuring DJ Quik & Xzibit	13 May 2000
28	953.	504 Boyz, Erica Foxx, Tamar Braxton	20 May 2000
29	954.	Ideal, Carl Thomas, Miracle	27 May 2000
30	955.	69 Boyz, Something for the People, Ruff Endz	3 June 2000
31	956.	Next, Kelis, Nelly	10 June 2000
32	957.	Kelly Price, Jagged Edge, J-Shin	17 June 2000

== Season 30 (2000–2001) ==
Back to Series overview

The 13th episode of this season and the 970th episode of the show marked the first new episode to air in the 21st century.

Season	Series	Guests	Original airdate
1	958.	L.V., So Plush, Big Tymers	September 16, 2000
2	959.	Lil' Kim, No Question, Major Figgas	September 23, 2000
3	960.	Rachelle Farrell, Changing Faces, Lil' Bow Wow featuring Jermaine Dupri	September 30, 2000
4	961.	Joe, Trina, Music Video:Yolanda Adams	October 7, 2000
5	962.	Tamia, Avant, Ced featuring C. Black	October 14, 2000
6	963.	Stephen Simmonds, Public Announcement, Cole	October 21, 2000
7	964.	Ricky Bell, Toni Estes, Tank	October 28, 2000
8	965.	Kandi Burruss, 3LW, Mack 10	November 4, 2000
9	966.	Mýa, Lil' Zane, Jill Scott	November 11, 2000
10	967.	Mystikal, Pru, Sunday	November 18, 2000
11	968.	Charlie Wilson featuring Snoop Dogg, Monifah, Shaggy	November 25, 2000
12	969.	Macy Gray, Profyle, Doggy's Angels	December 2, 2000
13	970.	Chanté Moore, Ja Rule, Bilal	January 6, 2001
14	971.	Ruff Endz, Sparkle, Bad Azz	January 13, 2001
15	972.	Outkast, Dave Hollister, Slimm Calhoun	January 20, 2001
16	973.	Carl Thomas, Crystal Sierra, Shyne	January 27, 2001
17	974.	K-Ci & JoJo, Musiq, Xzibit	February 3, 2001
18	975.	Common & Macy Gray, The Transitions, Olivia	February 10, 2001
19	976.	Nelly, Jamie Hawkins, Case	February 17, 2001
20	977.	112, Jaheim, Music Video: Yolanda Adams	February 24, 2001
21	978.	Lil' Bow Wow, Alicia Keys, Silkk the Shocker featuring Trina	March 31, 2001
22	979.	Jesse Powell, Koffee Brown, India.Arie	April 7, 2001
23	980.	Jon B, JT Money, R.L.	April 14, 2001
24	981.	Eric Benet, Master P featuring Silkk The Shocker and Lil' Romeo, Music Video: Mystikal	April 21, 2001
25	982.	Chanté Moore featuring Da Brat, Dark Blu, P.Y.T.	April 28, 2001
26	983.	The Product G&B, Iconz, Craig David	May 5, 2001
27	984.	L-Burna, Tank, Canela	May 12, 2001
28	985.	Tyrese, City High, Trick Daddy	May 19, 2001
29	986.	IMx, Dante, Lil' Mo	June 9, 2001
30	987.	Nelly & the St. Lunatics, Spooks, B2K	June 16, 2001
31	988.	Silk, Angie Martinez, Syleena Johnson	June 23, 2001
32	989.	Full Force featuring Bambue, Sunshine Anderson, Toya, LOL	June 30, 2001

== Season 31 (2001–2002) ==
Back to Series overview

Season	Series	Guests	Original airdate
1	990.	Tyrese, Keke Wyatt, Music Video: R. Kelly featuring Jay-Z	October 13, 2001
2	991.	Kenny Lattimore, India.Arie, Mr. Cheeks	October 20, 2001
3	992.	Ray J, Angie Stone, Coo Coo Cal	October 27, 2001
4	993.	P. Diddy, Lil' J, Allure	November 3, 2001
5	994.	Ruff Endz, Dena Cali, Jimmy Cozier	November 10, 2001
6	995.	Bell Biv DeVoe, Jesse Powell, Won G	November 17, 2001
7	996.	Ludacris & Jermaine Dupri, Pru, Lil' Romeo	November 24, 2001
8	997.	Montell Jordan, Master P, Christina Milian, Prophet Jones	December 1, 2001
9	998.	Fabolous featuring Nate Dogg, IMx, Glenn Lewis	December 22, 2001
10	999.	Warren G, Mpress, Nate Dogg featuring Fabolous	December 29, 2001
11	1000.	Faith Evans, Rayvon, Mack 10	January 5, 2002
12	1001.	Regina Belle, B2K, G. Dep	January 12, 2002
13	1002.	Busta Rhymes, R.L. featuring Erick Sermon, Corey	January 26, 2002
14	1003.	Isley Brothers featuring Ronald Isley, Method Man & Redman, Ali	February 2, 2002
15	1004.	Ja Rule featuring Case and Ashanti, Jaguar Wright featuring Bilal, Pretty Willie	February 9, 2002
16	1005.	Nelly, Jagged Edge, Jaheim	February 16, 2002
17	1006.	Avant, Ashanti, Code 5	March 23, 2002
18	1007.	Donell Jones, Sharissa, Horace Brown	March 30, 2002
19	1008.	Fat Joe featuring Ashanti, Joi, Mr. Cheeks featuring Horace Brown	April 6, 2002
20	1009.	Kirk Franklin, Lindsay Pagano, Cee Lo Green	April 13, 2002
21	1010.	B2K, Baha Men, Truth Hurts featuring Rakim	May 18, 2002
22	1011.	Musiq Soulchild, Tweet, Ying Yang Twins	May 25, 2002
23	1012.	Keke Wyatt, Nappy Roots, Jerzee Monet	June 1, 2002
24	1013.	Naughty by Nature, 3LW, DJ Quik, Mario	June 8, 2002
25	1014.	Winans Phase 2, Soluna, Ms. Jade	June 15, 2002
26	1015.	IMx, Yasmeen, Music Video: Lil' Bow Wow	June 22, 2002
27	1016.	Mary Mary, LovHer, Cee Lo Green	June 29, 2002
28	1017.	Lil' Bow Wow, Raphael Saadiq, Lady May featuring Blu Cantrell	July 6, 2002

== Season 32 (2002–2003) ==
Back to Series overview

This is Shemar Moore's last season as host.

Season	Series	Guests	Original airdate
1	1018.	Nelly, Ali, Prymary Colorz and Rah Digga, Isyss	September 14, 2002
2	1019.	Avant, Beenie Man featuring Calibe, 3rd Storee featuring Joe Budden	September 21, 2002
3	1020.	Glenn Lewis featuring Amel Larrieux, Cam'ron, Exhale	September 28, 2002
4	1021.	Ruff Endz, TG4, Jade Anderson	October 5, 2002
5	1022.	India.Arie, Heather Headley, Robin Thicke	October 12, 2002
6	1023.	Deborah Cox, Dave Hollister, Pastor Troy	October 19, 2002
7	1024.	Angie Martinez, Tank, Black Coffey	October 26, 2002
8	1025.	Kelly Rowland, Trinitee 5:7, Clipse	November 2, 2002
9	1026.	Amerie, Fabolous, Big Tymers	November 9, 2002
10	1027.	Shaggy, Brian and Tony Gold, Lil' Wayne, 3LW	November 16, 2002
11	1028.	Jaheim, Floetry, W.C. from Nate Dogg	November 23, 2002
12	1029.	The Unit featuring Queen Latifah, Michelle Williams, Baby from Big Tymers	November 30, 2002
13	1030.	Marques Houston, Solange Knowles, Benzino	January 4, 2003
14	1031.	Ashanti, Sounds of Blackness, Smilez & Southstar	January 11, 2003
15	1032.	Busta Rhymes, Syleena Johnson, B2K	January 18, 2003
16	1033.	Darius Rucker, Slum Village, Talib Kweli	January 25, 2003
17	1034.	K-Ci & JoJo, Cam'ron, Field Mob	February 1, 2003
18	1035.	Next, Howard Hewett, Nappy Roots	February 8, 2003
19	1036.	Dru Hill, Lil' Romeo, Needa S.	February 15, 2003
20	1037.	Deborah Cox, Tyrese	February 22, 2003
21	1038.	Ginuwine, MC Lyte, Nivea	March 1, 2003
22	1039.	Bone Thugs-N-Harmony, 702, Amanda Perez	March 8, 2003
23	1040.	Floetry, Mr. Cheeks, Choppa featuring Master P	March 15, 2003
24	1041.	Chico DeBarge, Nick Cannon, Sean Paul	March 22, 2003
25	1042.	Jody Watley, Roscoe featuring Kurupt, Wayne Wonder	May 3, 2003
26	1043.	Vivian Green, Impromp2 featuring Kim Fields, Chingy	May 10, 2003
27	1044.	Brian McKnight, Deep Side, Deitrick Haddon	May 17, 2003
28	1045.	3LW, B.G., Donnie	May 24, 2003
29	1046.	Lil' Kim, Latif	May 31, 2003
30	1047.	Tamia, Loon, Novel	June 7, 2003
31	1048.	Blu Cantrell, Smokie Norful, Allen Anthony	June 14, 2003
32	1049.	Tyrese, Da Brat, Cherish, Question	June 21, 2003

== Season 33 (2003–2004) ==
Back to Series overview

Starting with this season, Dorian Gregory takes over as host.

Season	Series	Guests	Original airdate
1	1050.	Jeffrey Osborne, Anthony Hamilton, Jacki-O	October 11, 2003
2	1051.	Big Gipp featuring Sleepy Brown, JS, Lumidee	October 18, 2003
3	1052.	Avant, Ramiyah, Da Band	October 25, 2003
4	1053.	Chante Moore, Kenny Lattimore, Lil' Zane featuring Tank	November 1, 2003
5	1054.	Montell Jordan, Tarralyn Ramsey, Justin Guarini	November 8, 2003
6	1055.	Nick Cannon, Javier, Music Video: P. Diddy featuring Lenny Kravitz and Pharrell Williams	November 15, 2003
7	1056.	The Isley Brothers featuring Ronald Isley	November 22, 2003
8	1057.	Rhian Benson, Marques Houston/ATL	November 29, 2003
9	1058.	Dwele, Baby Bash & Frankie J, Joe	December 6, 2003
10	1059.	Brian McKnight, Kindred the Family Soul, Kem	December 13, 2003
11	1060.	Loon, Glenn Lewis, Jhene	December 20, 2003
12	1061.	Dave Hollister, Jagged Edge	December 27, 2003
13	1062.	En Vogue, C.L. Ryderz (Nine Up & Nobody)	January 31, 2004
14	1063.	Michelle Williams, Teedra Moses	February 7, 2004
15	1064.	Goapele, YahZarah	February 14, 2004
16	1065.	Master P, Freddie Jackson	February 21, 2004
17	1066.	Tamia, Van Hunt, Crea	March 13, 2004
18	1067.	Musiq, Knoc-Turn'al	March 20, 2004
19	1068.	Murphy Lee, Tiffany Villarreal, Young Rome featuring Omarion	March 27, 2004
20	1069.	Carl Thomas, ATL, Lil' Scrappy	April 3, 2004
21	1070.	Mr. Cheeks, Del, Tawny	May 8, 2004
22	1071.	Lorenzo Owens, JoJo	May 15, 2004
23	1072.	Teena Marie, Ricky Fanté	May 22, 2004
24	1073.	Rhian Benson, Tonx, Tino Brown	May 29, 2004
25	1074.	Lil' Wayne, Trina Broussard, LaShell Griffin	June 5, 2004
26	1075.	Freddie Jackson, Houston	June 12, 2004
27	1076.	Truth Hurts, Akon	June 19, 2004
28	1077.	Nina Sky, Mishon, Keyshia Cole	June 26, 2004

== Season 34 (2004–2005) ==
Back to Series overview

Season	Series	Guests	Original airdate
1	1078.	Ying Yang Twins, Billy Miles	October 9, 2004
2	1079.	Tiffany Evans, Deitrick Haddon, Won-G	October 16, 2004
3	1080.	Regina Belle, 4Mula1	October 23, 2004
4	1081.	Boyz II Men, O'Ryan, Silkk the Shocker	October 30, 2004
5	1082.	New Edition, Lina	November 6, 2004
6	1083.	Guerilla Black, Toshi, Urban Mystic	November 13, 2004
7	1084.	K. Young, Generation J, Lil' Eddie	November 20, 2004
8	1085.	Allure, Terrance Quaites	November 27, 2004
9	1086.	Fantasia Barrino, Ray, Razah	February 12, 2005
10	1087.	John Legend, Nina Shaw, Lil' iROCC	February 19, 2005
11	1088.	Brian McKnight, B5	February 26, 2005
12	1089.	Mario, Lyfe Jennings	March 5, 2005
13	1090.	Smokie Norful, N2U, Frankie J	April 9, 2005
14	1091.	Trillville, J'Adore, Ee-De	April 16, 2005
15	1092.	Omarion, Kierra "Kiki" Sheard	April 23, 2005
16	1093.	Lalah Hathaway, Tye Tribbett	April 30, 2005
17	1094.	Vivian Green, Cuban Link featuring Mýa, Pretty Ricky	May 7, 2005
18	1095.	Mint Condition, Nicole C. Mullen	May 14, 2005
19	1096.	The Avila Brothers, Emelee	May 21, 2005
20	1097.	Leela James, J. Moss, Anisha Nicole	May 28, 2005
21	1098.	Mike Jones, Corey Clark	June 4, 2005
22	1099.	La Toya London, Michael Spencer, Dame	June 11, 2005
23	1100.	Ciara, T.I., P$C	June 18, 2005
24	1101.	Marques Houston, Fatty Koo, Slim Thug	June 25, 2005

== Season 35 (2005–2006) ==
Back to Series overview

This is the last season to feature original episodes, and the shortest in the program's run, with only 16 episodes produced and aired.

Season	Series	Guests	Original airdate
1	1102.	The Pussycat Dolls, Chris Brown, Na'sha	November 5, 2005
2	1103.	Mary Mary, Ginuwine, Nivea	November 12, 2005
3	1104.	Ray J, Ebony Eyez	November 19, 2005
4	1105.	Trey Songz, Dwele, Keke Wyatt	November 26, 2005
5	1106.	Floetry, Pretty Ricky	January 7, 2006
6	1107.	Eric Benet, Dem Franchize Boyz	January 14, 2006
7	1108.	Jazze Pha and Cee-Lo Green, Kindred the Family Soul, Taurus	January 21, 2006
8	1109.	Heather Headley, Chamillionaire	January 28, 2006
9	1110.	Kirk Franklin, T-Pain, Music Video: Beyoncé featuring Slim Thug and Bun-B "Check On It"	February 4, 2006
10	1111.	Donell Jones, LeToya Luckett	February 11, 2006
11	1112.	Charlie Wilson, Youngbloodz	February 18, 2006
12	1113.	Karen Clark-Sheard, Urban Mystic, Marcos Hernandez	February 25, 2006
13	1114.	Final Draft, Flipsyde, Cruna	March 4, 2006
14	1115.	T.I., Sammie	March 11, 2006
15	1116.	Javier, D4L	March 18, 2006
16	1117.	Goapele, Lorenzo Owens	March 25, 2006

== Season 36 (2006–2007): The Best of Soul Train ==
Back to Series overview

For two years beginning in the fall of 2006, the program presented archived episodes under the title "The Best of Soul Train". Fifty-six editions of the show, randomly selected and ranging in a time frame from 1973 through 1988, were re-aired during the 2006–07 and 2007–08 seasons.

Season	Series	Guests	Airdate	Original airdate
1	76	Barry White, Love Unlimited, The Temprees	December 9, 2006	October 27, 1973
2	158	War, The Main Ingredient	December 16, 2006	November 15, 1975
3	375	Patti LaBelle, The Time	December 23, 2006	November 14, 1981
4	514	James Ingram, Levert	December 30, 2006	October 11, 1986
5	93.	Al Green, The Impressions	January 6, 2007	April 6, 1974
6	136	Blue Magic, Sister Sledge, Major Harris	January 13, 2007	April 12, 1975
7	361	The Sugarhill Gang, Patrice Rushen	January 20, 2007	May 16, 1981
8	567	Pebbles, Jermaine Stewart, The Bus Boys	January 27, 2007	April 30, 1988
9	161	Average White Band, The Undisputed Truth	February 3, 2007	November 29, 1975
10	338	Rick James, The S.O.S. Band	February 10, 2007	October 11, 1980
11	414	Evelyn "Champagne" King, Grandmaster Flash & the Furious Five	February 17, 2007	May 21, 1983
12	463	Donna Summer, The Staple Singers	February 24, 2007	December 15, 1984
13	164	Billy Preston, The Sylvers	March 3, 2007	December 27, 1975
14	410	Carl Carlton, Vanity 6	March 10, 2007	January 1, 1983
15	449	The Dazz Band, Run-D.M.C.	March 17, 2007	June 16, 1984
16	551	Freddie Jackson, Whodini, Lace	March 24, 2007	November 14, 1987
17	107	Billy Preston, Rufus, George McCrae	March 31, 2007	September 7, 1974
18	137	The Dramatics, Barbara Mason, Ben E. King	April 7, 2007	April 19, 1975
19	174	Wilson Pickett, Betty Wright, The Modulations	April 14, 2007	March 6, 1976
20	227	Johnny "Guitar" Watson, The Whispers	April 21, 2007	September 10, 1977
21	242	Brick, Sister Sledge	April 28, 2007	December 24, 1977
22	269	Peabo Bryson, Stargard	May 5, 2007	September 30, 1978
23	273	Freda Payne, Atlantic Starr	May 12, 2007	October 28, 1978
24	283	Marilyn McCoo and Billy Davis Jr., Lakeside	May 19, 2007	January 6, 1979
25	292	Gino Vannelli, Gloria Gaynor	May 26, 2007	March 10, 1979
26	303	A Tribute to Minnie Riperton (featuring Stevie Wonder, Wintley Phipps, Lorraine Fields and Larry Vickers)	June 2, 2007	September 15, 1979
27	318	Chic, High Inergy	June 9, 2007	February 9, 1980
28	325	The Spinners, Con Funk Shun	June 16, 2007	April 12, 1980
29	326	Captain and Tennille, The Ritchie Family	June 23, 2007	April 19, 1980
30	329	Jermaine Jackson, The Dramatics	June 30, 2007	May 10, 1980
31	339	Tyrone Davis, Teena Marie	July 7, 2007	October 18, 1980
32	345	Lenny Williams, Yellow Magic Orchestra	July 14, 2007	November 29, 1980
33	362	Betty Wright, Funkadelic	July 21, 2007	May 23, 1981
34	388	Sister Sledge, Ray Parker Jr.	July 28, 2007	May 1, 1982
35	398	A Taste of Honey, Jeffrey Osborne	August 4, 2007	July 10, 1982
36	415	Angela Bofill, Con Funk Shun	August 11, 2007	May 28, 1983
37	429	Jennifer Holiday, Klique	August 18, 2007	November 26, 1983
38	465	Teena Marie, Whodini	August 25, 2007	January 12, 1985
39	475	Sheena Easton, The Mary Jane Girls	September 1, 2007	April 13, 1985
40	484	Sheila E., Five Star	September 8, 2007	October 12, 1985
41	509	The S.O.S. Band, Juicy, Jermaine Stewart	September 15, 2007	June 14, 1986
42	516	Run-D.M.C., Genobia Jeter	September 22, 2007	October 25, 1986
43	529	Rose Royce, Chico DeBarge	September 29, 2007	March 21, 1987
44	559	Vanity, Kool Moe Dee, Angela Winbush and Ronald Isley	October 6, 2007	March 5, 1988
45	98	Sylvia, The Moments, Ecstasy, Passion & Pain	October 13, 2007	May 11, 1974
46	102	The Staple Singers, Bunny Sigler	October 20, 2007	June 8, 1974
47	103	Kool & the Gang, Al Wilson, Natural Four	October 27, 2007	June 15, 1974
48	115	The Fifth Dimension, Al Wilson, Formula IV	November 3, 2007	November 2, 1974
49	123	Graham Central Station, Zulema, Leon Haywood	November 10, 2007	January 11, 1975
50	152	The Pointer Sisters, B.T. Express, Ralph Carter	November 17, 2007	October 4, 1975
51	169	The Dells, Bloodstone	November 24, 2007	January 31, 1976
52	194	Marilyn McCoo and Billy Davis Jr., Deniece Williams	December 1, 2007	October 23, 1976
53	218	B.T. Express, Letta Mbulu, Enchantment	December 8, 2007	April 9, 1977
54	264	The Brothers Johnson, The Dells	December 15, 2007	August 26, 1978
55	286	Brass Construction, Peaches and Herb, Captain Sky	December 22, 2007	January 27, 1979
56	289	Joe Simon, Cheryl Lynn	December 29, 2007	February 17, 1979

== Season 37 (2008): The Best of Soul Train ==
Back to Series overview

At this point, once all of the 56 episodes of The Best of Soul Train had been aired, a select few out of the 56 were reaired again for this season.

By September 22, 2008, the series ceased distribution.

Season	Series	Guests	Airdate	Original airdate
1	292.	Gino Vannelli, Gloria Gaynor	January 5, 2008	March 10, 1979
2	283.	Marilyn McCoo and Billy Davis Jr., Lakeside	January 12, 2008	January 6, 1979
3	303.	A Tribute to Minnie Riperton	January 19, 2008	September 15, 1979
4	318.	Chic, High Inergy	January 26, 2008	February 9, 1980
5	273.	Freda Payne, Atlantic Starr	February 2, 2008	October 28, 1978
6	325.	The Spinners, Con Funk Shun	February 9, 2008	April 12, 1980
7	269.	Peabo Bryson, Stargard	February 16, 2008	September 30, 1978
8	326.	Captain and Tennille, The Ritchie Family	February 23, 2008	April 19, 1980
9	242.	Brick, Sister Sledge	March 1, 2008	December 24, 1977
10	174.	Wilson Pickett, Betty Wright, The Modulations	March 8, 2008	March 6, 1976
11	329.	Jermaine Jackson, The Dramatics	March 15, 2008	May 10, 1980
12	339.	Tyrone Davis, Teena Marie	March 22, 2008	October 18, 1980
13	227.	Johnny "Guitar" Watson, The Whispers	March 29, 2008	September 10, 1977
14	429.	Jennifer Holliday, Klique	April 5, 2008	November 26, 1983
15	137.	The Dramatics, Barbara Mason, Ben E. King	April 12, 2008	April 19, 1975
16	415.	Con Funk Shun, Angela Bofill	April 19, 2008	May 28, 1983
17	107.	Billy Preston, Rufus, George McCrae	April 26, 2008	September 7, 1974
18	398.	A Taste of Honey, Jeffrey Osborne	May 3, 2008	July 10, 1982
19	551.	Freddie Jackson, Whodini, Lace	May 10, 2008	November 14, 1987
20	388.	Sister Sledge, Ray Parker, Jr.	May 17, 2008	May 1, 1982
21	449.	The Dazz Band, Run-D.M.C.	May 24, 2008	June 16, 1984
22	362.	Betty Wright, Funkadelic	May 31, 2008	May 23, 1981
23	410.	Carl Carlton, Vanity 6	June 7, 2008	January 1, 1983
24	345.	Lenny Williams, Yellow Magic Orchestra	June 14, 2008	November 29, 1980
25	289.	Joe Simon, Cheryl Lynn	June 21, 2008	February 17, 1979
26	76.	Barry White, Love Unlimited, The Temprees	June 28, 2008	October 27, 1973
27	567.	Pebbles, Jermaine Stewart, The Bus Boys	July 5, 2008	April 30, 1988
28	218.	B.T. Express, Letta Mbulu, Enchantment	July 12, 2008	April 9, 1977
29	93.	Al Green, The Impressions	July 19, 2008	April 6, 1974
30	559.	Vanity, Kool Moe Dee, Angela Winbush and Ronald Isley	July 26, 2008	March 5, 1988
31	286.	Brass Construction, Peaches and Herb, Captain Sky	August 2, 2008	January 27, 1979
32	98.	Sylvia, The Moments, Ecstasy, Passion & Pain	August 9, 2008	May 11, 1974
33	529.	Rose Royce, Chico DeBarge	August 16, 2008	March 21, 1987
34	264.	The Brothers Johnson, The Dells	August 23, 2008	August 26, 1978
35	102.	The Staple Singers, Bunny Sigler	August 30, 2008	June 8, 1974
36	516.	Run-D.M.C., Genobia Jeter	September 6, 2008	October 25, 1986
37	514.	James Ingram, Levert	September 13, 2008	October 11, 1986
38	463.	Donna Summer, The Staple Singers	September 20, 2008	December 15, 1984
