= Willie Clayton =

American singer

- Born: March 29, 1955 (age 71); Indianola, Mississippi, United States
- Genres: Chicago blues, soul-blues, Chicago soul
- Occupations: Singer, songwriter
- Instrument: Vocals
- Years active: Late 1960s – present
- Label: Various
- Website: www.willieclayton.net

Willie Clayton (born March 29, 1955) is an American Chicago blues and soul-blues singer and songwriter. He has recorded over 25 albums since the 1980s. He has been performing since the late 1960s. His chart successes span the decades from the 1980s onward.

Allmusic noted that Clayton is "one of those vocalists who could sing the phone book and the result would sound perfectly phrased and memorable." Along with Buddy Guy, Koko Taylor, and Little Milton, Clayton was one of the most important figures in Chicago blues in the 1970s and 1980s.

== Biography ==
Clayton was born in Indianola, Mississippi, one of 11 siblings. He sang gospel in his church as a youngster. Duplex Records issued his debut single, "That's the Way Daddy Did" (1969). In 1971, Clayton relocated to Chicago, Illinois, and appeared regularly in local clubs. He was introduced to Al Green's record producer, Willie Mitchell, who signed Clayton to a recording contract with Pawn, a subsidiary label of Hi Records. Mitchell produced several tracks with Clayton, including "I Must Be Losin' You," "It's Time You Made Up Your Mind," and "Baby You're Ready," but none of them reached the national charts. Clayton toured nationally on the same bill as Green, James Brown and Barry White, before creating his own label, Sky Hero, which issued "Living with You, But My Heart Is Somewhere Else."

Clayton released the single "Rock You" for the Good Luck record label in 1980. The song was written and produced by the Lu-Cor Music team of Maurice Commander and Jerline Shelton-Commander, as well as, S. Harris (according to label printing). Another Chicago-based artist who made on the Billboard chart and Soul Train with the efforts of the Lu-Cor team (Morris Jefferson) later covered the song for the re-release of the album Rock You! in the late 1980s.

Clayton then joined Compleat Records. He issued a couple of singles before "Tell Me", produced by General Crook, was a modest hit in 1984. It was followed on the US Billboard R&B chart by "What a Way to Put It." He returned to the R&B chart in 1989, credited by Polydor Records as Will Clayton, with "Never Too Late" and "Tell Me" (a different song from his earlier hit), followed by "I Wanna Be Where You Are", on which he was co-credited with Audrey Wheeler, a former runner-up in the Miss Black Universe contest, who also recorded with Jeff Lorber and Omar Chandler and worked as a session singer. Clayton also recorded a number of albums with Ichiban Records. In 1992, a joint compilation album with Bobby McClure, Bobby McClure & Willie Clayton, was released by Hi Records.

In 1993, Ace Records released the album Let's Get Together, followed by Simply Beautiful and It's About Love (1999). His 1998 album, Something to Talk About, reached number 14 on the Billboard Top Blues Albums chart. Clayton had similar chart successes for the following ten years. Something to Talk About included his duet with Tyrone Davis on the song "Mine All Mine" and his cover versions of the songs "Something to Talk About" and "Heart of the City." Clayton started another record label, EndZone, in the late 1990s. He signed with Malaco Records in 2005.

Clayton recorded his version of "I Can't Stand the Rain" on his 2008 album Soul & Blues. My Tyme, which was released the same year, was his third album in a five-year period to peak at number 83 on the Billboard Top R&B Albums chart. He returned to the singles chart in 2010, after an absence of over 20 years, with his recording of "We Both Grown", a duet with Dave Hollister

His latest album, I Am Rhythm & Blues, was released in 2012. In May 2013, Clayton performed at the Leflore County Civic Center in Greenwood, Mississippi.

== Chart discography ==
=== Albums ===
Year	Title	US Billboard Top Blues Albums Chart	US Billboard Top R&B/Hip-Hop Albums Chart
1998	Something To Talk About	14	-
2000	Call Me Mr. C	14	-
2001	Little Giant of Soul	7	-
2002	The Last Man Standing	5	-
2004	Changing Tha Game	5	83
2005	Full Circle	7	-
2006	Gifted	5	83
2008	Soul & Blues	11	93
2008	My Tyme	6	83
2012	I Am Rhythm & Blues	-	-
2020	Ultimate Willie Clayton	-	-

=== Singles ===
Year	Title	US Billboard Hot R&B/Hip-Hop Songs Chart	Notes
1984	"Tell Me"	78	Compleat 120, produced by General Crook
1984	"What a Way To Put It"	84	Compleat 124, produced by General Crook
1989	"Never Too Late"	52	Polydor 871417, billed as Will Clayton
1989	"Tell Me"	74	Polydor 889658, billed as Will Clayton
1989	"I Wanna Be Where You Are"	62	Polydor 876762, billed as Will Clayton, with Audrey Wheeler
2010	"We Both Grown"	84	CC Entertainment, billed as Willie Clayton, with Dave Hollister
2020	"Love Don't Hurt Me"	-	Mardi Gras Records

== Accolades ==
- 2021 - Winner - Jackson Music Awards - Best Recording by a Single Artist - “Love Don’t Hurt Me”.
- 2021 - Winner - Jackson Music Awards - Record of the Year - “Love Don’t Hurt Me”.

== See also ==
- List of Chicago blues musicians
- List of soul-blues musicians
- List of soul musicians
- List of R&B musicians
