= Phajja =

- Origin: U.S.A
- Genres: Contemporary R&B
- Years active: 1987–2000
- Labels: Warner Bros. Records
- Members: Kena Epps; Karen Johnson; Nakia Epps

Phajja were an all-female contemporary R&B trio that released two albums on Warner Bros. Records and several moderately successful singles. Its members are Kena and Nakia Epps, sisters from Chicago, and Karen Johnson, of Boston. The ladies began singing together in 1987. The group originally consisted of five members and the original name was "Not Your Average Girls". The five ladies traveled and performed original music for several years before landing their first record deal with Capitol Records in 1991, however never released an album. In 1993 the five ladies disbanded and Kena, Karen, & Nakia continued on, changed their name to "Phajja" and shortly after left Capitol Records and signed with Arista Records. In 1995 Phajja signed with Warner Brothers Records. Although having been signed to three major labels it was with Warner Brothers Records when they would release their first album "Seize The Moment".

Phajja released two singles from its debut album "Seize the Moment" (1997), "What Are You Waiting For" and "So Long (Well, Well, Well)". Smooth Jazz radio stations also played their cover of Sailing originally recorded by American artist Christopher Cross. Phajja also appeared on Soul Train on May 17, 1997. Following a brief break, the group released the 1999 single "Checkin' for Me" produced by Mario Winans and written by themselves and Shari "Truth Hurts" Watson, from their second album, Meeting in the Ladies' Room (1999).

== Discography ==
Albums

- Seize the Moment (1997)
- Meeting in the Ladies Room (1999)

Singles

- "What Are You Waiting For" (1997)
- "So Long" (1997)
- "Checkin' for Me" (1999)
