= Lana Ogilvie =

Canadian fashion model

- Born: March 8, 1968 (age 58); Toronto, Ontario, Canada
- Modelling information
- Height: 1.78 m (5 ft 10 in)
- Hair colour: Brown
- Eye colour: Hazel
- Agency: Heffner Management, The Model CoOp

Lana Ogilvie is a Canadian fashion model. She was the first model of colour to be given a contract with the CoverGirl cosmetics brand, frequently being paired with Rachel Hunter. She appeared in the 1994 Sports Illustrated Swimsuit Issue and was a host on Soul Train.

== Career ==
Lana was "discovered" at her high school fashion show as a teen in her hometown of Toronto, Canada. She moved to New York to work with the prestigious Ford Models, where she lived at Eileen Ford's house along with other Ford alumni, Christy Turlington and Naomi Campbell.

After working in Paris, Milan and London as a sought after runway model for designers such as Azzedine Alaïa, Gianfranco Ferré, Prada, Missoni, Sonia Rykiel, Karl Lagerfeld, and Issey Miyake, Ogilvie became a regular face in magazines around the world such as Vogue, Elle, Cosmopolitan, Madame, LA Style, Grazia, Amica, Fashion, Chatelaine and Flare.

Ogilvie has been featured in numerous advertising campaigns including DKNY, Express, Ann Taylor, Gap, Banana Republic, Macy's, Lord & Taylor, Saks Fifth Avenue, Bergdorf Goodman, Escada, Birks, Clairol, Nordstrom, Ralph Lauren, and Neiman Marcus. Her classic beauty made her a favourite of photographers like; Albert Watson, Arthur Elgort, Hans Feurer, Gilles Bensimon and Bruce Weber.

In 1992, she became the first Black model to sign a multi-year contract with CoverGirl cosmetics company, and she appeared in the 1994 Sports Illustrated Swimsuit Issue.

Moving into television, Ogilvie became an on-air host and segment producer at Fashion Television, a segment contributor for CBC Television, and CityLine, as well as writing for various Canadian fashion magazines. After studying to be a fine jeweler, she started Sabre Jewelry.

In 2019, Ogilvie launched her personal skincare line, Lana Ogilvie Cosmetics.
