= Randy Brown (musician) =

American R&B singer (1952–2025)

Randy Brown (December 31,1952 – March 3, 2025) was an American R&B singer.

== Early life and career ==
Born in Memphis, Tennessee, Brown started as a singer of doo-wop and in his local church. He became a solo singer after recording with Memphis group, The Newcomers, who had the R&B hit "Pin The Tail On The Donkey" in 1971, on Stax Records. In 1973, Brown left The Newcomers and recorded his first single "Did You Hear Yourself" on Stax Records. After several unsuccessful singles on a Stax subsidiary label, in 1975 he recorded "You Can Be Cured" and "Take a Few More Steps" on Mainstream Records, which he left one year later. Brown was persuaded to return to the studio by writer/producer Carl Hampton in 1978.

After receiving a call from Hampton, with whom he had been at school, Brown recorded four tracks that were given to Russ Regan at Parachute Records. One of the songs, "I'd Rather Hurt Myself," left Regan impressed and the song was then recorded. The song was well received by the public and then Brown recorded additional tracks, thus completing the album Welcome To My Room, which was released in 1978.

"I'd Rather Hurt Myself" was well known in Brazil as "The Hang glider song", because of the scenes where it was played in the background, in the soap opera Pai Herói, in 1979. Brown had another success in 1980, "We Ought To Be Doin 'It," which reached No. 16 on the R&B chart in the United States.

Hampton produced and wrote all of the material on Brown's debut album with Homer Banks, another long-time Memphis producer/musician. Brown recorded four albums for Casablanca Records' subsidiaries, Parachute and Chocolate City, in the late 1970s and early 1980s, often performing songs penned and produced by Homer Banks, now working with writer/guitarist, Chuck Brooks. At one point, Brown was also a short-term member of The Temprees.

Brown's brother was William Brown, who was a member of The Mad Lads group and also a studio recording engineer, especially at Stax Records. He produced several tracks for his brother on Truth, which were later released in 1981 on an album on the re-activated Stax Records, following the takeover by Fantasy Records.

== Personal life and death ==
Randy Brown lived in his hometown, Memphis and came out of retirement to perform at London’s Jazz Cafe in December 2019. On March 3, 2025, it was announced that Brown had died at the age of 72.

== Discography ==
=== Albums ===
- Welcome to My Room (1978) U.S. R&B #48
- Intimately (1979) U.S. R&B #46
- Midnight Desire (1980) U.S. R&B #50
- Check It Out (1981)
- Randy (1981)

=== Singles ===
- "I Wanna Make Love To You" (1978) U.S. R&B #22
- "I'd Rather Hurt Myself (Than To Hurt You)" (1978) U.S. R&B #89
- "We Ought to Be Doin' It" (1980) U.S. R&B #16
