= Morris Jefferson =

American singer

Morris Jefferson (born Chicago, Illinois, United States) is an American disco/funk performer who produced only two known albums. His first, Spank Your Blank Blank, was released in 1978 on Parachute Records. It was a collection of rousing and highly danceable disco funk gems, whose titles revolve around the theme of "spank": "To Spank With Love," "Spank Your Thang," "Dr. Spank," et al. The record producers, writers, and arrangers for this release were Jerline Shelton and Maurice Commander; executive producer was Lucky Cordell. Two singles were released from the album: "Spank Your Blank Blank" (1977), which went to No. 34 on the US Billboard R&B chart in 1978; and "To Spank with Love / Spank Your Thang". In 1980, he released a single "One More Time / " It's The Last Time Around For Me", on the Good Luck record label.

Morris Jefferson released a second album in 1984 entitled Rock Out!

Over the past twenty years, Jefferson has turned his attention to performing gospel music in various religious settings.

== See also ==
- List of disco artists (L–R)
- List of Soul Train episodes
