= General Crook (musician) =

American soul musician

General Crook (born General Columbus Crook, February 28, 1945, Mound Bayou, Mississippi, United States) is an American soul musician.

Crook was raised in Greenville, Mississippi, and moved to Chicago, Illinois, when he was 17. In 1969, he signed with Capitol Records, recording with an early version of Earth, Wind and Fire. His debut single, "In the Warmth of My Arms", appeared in 1969, followed by "When Love Leaves You Crying" in 1970. Neither sold well, and Capitol soon dropped Crook.

His 1970-71 releases for Down to Earth Records fared better; "Gimme Some" reached No. 22 on the US Billboard R&B chart in 1970, and "What Time It Is" peaked at No. 31 on the same chart the following year. He later recorded for Wand Records, including a self-titled album in 1974. After the mid-1970s, he was active primarily as a songwriter and record producer, principally with Syl Johnson and Willie Clayton.
