= Creme d'Cocoa =

- Genres: R&B, soul, disco
- Years active: 1978–1982
- Label: Venture

Creme d'Cocoa was an American disco group composed of former members of The Ambassadors and The Ebonys.

== History ==
The ensemble was founded in 1978 by three members of the Ambassadors and one of The Ebonys after both groups disbanded about the same time early that year. The group's debut single was "Do What You Feel", followed by a full-length entitled "Funked Up". The band's biggest hit was 1979's "Doin' the Dog", which reached #30 on the Billboard R&B charts. A sophomore full-length, Nasty Street, was issued in 1980 but did not spawn any hits; a final single was issued in 1982 before the group dissolved. Appeared on Soul Train the dance show on October 27, 1979 co-starring with the great Billy Preston.Songs rendered were "Doin The Dog & Baby Don't You Know That I Love Ya!"

== Discography ==
- Funked Up (Venture Records, 1978)
- Nasty Street (Venture, 1980)
