= Fiend =

Fiend may refer to:

- An evil spirit or demon in religion or mythology
- A person addicted to either a pernicious act, a cause, a hobby, or sport

== Music ==
- Fiends (album), by Christian post-hardcore band Chasing Victory
- Fiend (rapper) (born 1976), rapper formerly with No Limit Records
- "Fiend" (song), a 2002 song by Coal Chamber
- "Fiend", a song by Orgy from Candyass
- "Fiend", a song by Pestilence from the album Resurrection Macabre
- "F(r)iend", a song by In Flames from the album Soundtrack to Your Escape
- Fiend, a musical project by Brendan O'Hare

== Film ==
- The Fiend (film), a 1972 British serial killer horror film
- Fiend (film), a 1980 American B movie science fiction horror film

== Other ==
- The Fiend, an alter-ego of professional wrestler Bray Wyatt
- The Fiend, a Russian fairy tale
- Fiend (Dungeons & Dragons), a collective term for malicious creatures in the Dungeons & Dragons role-playing game
