= Mpress =

American girl group

- Origin: Florida, United States
- Genres: Pop; teen pop; R&B
- Years active: 1999–2002
- Labels: Big3; Artemis
- Past members: Marissa Clark; Zoraida Rosario; Brooke Stauder; Lauren Hart; Caroline Kelly

Mpress was an American girl group that consisted of Lauren (born Lauren Mareen Hart) from St. Petersburg, Zoraida (born Zoraida Virginia Rosario) from Orlando and Marissa (born Marissa Rosalia Clark) from Florida. They released their debut album Suddenly under Big 3 Records on October 23, 2001. It included a notable re-working of The Shirelles' hit "Will You Love Me Tomorrow". Mpress released their debut single called "Maybe", and it peaked at number 40 on Billboard's Dance Club Songs chart. They later released the single "Time Out" in 2002, but it failed to chart. They opened for pop acts such as Britney Spears and Justin Timberlake.

By the end of that same year, the group had disbanded and the members went their own separate ways. Marissa went on to pursue acting, appeared in the reality show Outback Jack and guest-starred in the series premiere of the FX Network series Rescue Me.

== Albums ==
- Suddenly (2001)
