= Fatty Koo =

American musical group

- Origin: Columbus, Ohio, United States
- Genres: R&B; soul
- Occupation: Singers/songwriters
- Years active: 2003–2006
- Labels: Sony Records; Columbia Records; DAS Label

Fatty Koo was an American R&B and hip-hop band from Columbus, Ohio that formed in 2005. The group's members were Eddie B, Gabrielle, Josh, Marya, Ron, and Valure. A television documentary on BET, Blowin Up: Fatty Koo, documented their career. Their debut single, "Bounce" was released in June 2005, and their debut album, House of Fatty Koo, was released on July 12, 2005, by Sony/Columbia Records. "Bounce" was selected as the anthem for TNT's NBA Playoffs in 2005. On May 26, 2005, Fatty Koo was awarded the key to the city of Columbus, the day officially being named "Fatty Koo Day".

== Members ==
- Ron Riley – Singer/Rapper/Songwriter/Producer
- Edward Brickerson (AKA Eddie B.) – Singer/Songwriter/Producer
- Kiana Allison (AKA Valure) – Singer/Songwriter
- Gabrielle Solange Travis – Singer/Songwriter
- Marya Barrios – Singer/Cellist/Songwriter
- Joshua Welton – Singer/Saxophonist/ Songwriter

== History ==
The five original members from the musical collective Fatty Koo met in Columbus, Ohio. Eddie B, Gabrielle, Marya, Ron, and Valure had been active participants in the inner city's CAPACITY youth arts program and engaged in the CAPACITY-sponsored "Columbus Songwriters’ Summit for Oneness" in 2003. Through completion of the summit, each individual member was invited to record on the nonprofit John Lennon Educational Tour Bus that provided a state-of-the-art mobile recording studio. The original members recorded an eight-song demo, and recorded multiple videos, which were later watched by manager David Sonenberg. The members, who had mixed backgrounds and musical preferences, become a music group in the fall of 2003. Shortly after, Fatty Koo signed a record deal with Sony BMG.

In 2004 they began recording their debut album with songwriter/producer Toby Gad. In 2005, Fatty Koo began to audition for a new male vocalist to join the group. Singer Miguel was initially considered but wasn't selected. Joshua Welton was later added to the group. Blowin Up: Fatty Koo aired on BET on April 21, 2005. The 13-episode reality TV show documented the group's career. Their debut album House of Fatty Koo was released on July 12, 2005.

== Discography ==
=== Album ===
Information	Chart positions		Sales and certifications
Information	U.S.	U.S. R&B	Sales and certifications
House of Fatty Koo: 1st studio album; Released: July 12, 2005; Formats: CD, digital download	64	22	RIAA: TBA; U.S sales: 100,000

=== Single ===
Year	Song	Chart positions		Album
Year	Song	US	US R&B	Album
2005	"Bounce" Theme Song	—	—	House of Fatty Koo
