= Impromp2 =

American jazz and hip-hop duo

- Genres: smooth jazz; jazz funk; jazz rap
- Years active: 1995–2009
- Labels: MoJazz; Motown; Big3
- Past members: Johnny Britt; Sean Thomas

Impromp2 were an smooth jazz and hip-hop duo active from 1995 to 2009.

== History ==
The duo was founded in 1995 and consisted of trumpeter Johnny Britt and rapper Sean Thomas. They were signed to MoJazz, then a subsidiary of Motown Records and released their debut album, You're Gonna Love This, the same year. The album had two hits, "Enjoy Yourself", which peaked at No. 72 on the Top R&B Albums chart, and "Get Me Off", which peaked at No. 122 on the same chart.

When MoJazz was dissolved in early 1997, Impromp2 was folded into Motown. Their next album, Can't Get Enough, which was finished at the time, was in limbo. The album was eventually released in April 1997, spawning one charting single, "Sweet Thang", which reached No. 101 on the Top R&B Albums chart.

After a seven-year hiatus, the group released their third album, The Definition of Love, during August 2003 via Big3 Records. It was commercially unsuccessful, not producing any charting hits. They released their next album, It Is What It Is, in December 2009. It produced their most successful single, "Luv 2 Ball", which reached No. 69 on the Top R&B Albums chart. The group disbanded the same year, with Britt stating that it was due to him pursuing solo ventures.

== Discography ==
- You're Gonna Love This (1995)
- Can't Get Enough (1997)
- The Definition of Love (2003)
- Luv 2 Ball (2009)
