= The Temprees =

American soul vocal trio

- Origin: Memphis, Tennessee, U.S.
- Genre: Soul
- Years active: 1970–1976; 1990s–present
- Labels: We Produce Records; Epic; High Stacks
- Members: Deljuan Calvin; Walter "Bo" Washington; Brandon Gilkey
- Past members: Breggie "Ted" Gilkey; Larry Dodson; Harold Scott; Jasper Phillips; JC Calvin; Solomon Young

The Temprees are an American soul vocal trio from Memphis, Tennessee, most popular during the 1970s. The band released several albums on We Produce Records, an offshoot of Stax Records. In 1972, the band performed in front of more than 100,000 fans at the famous Wattstax festival in Los Angeles.

== History ==
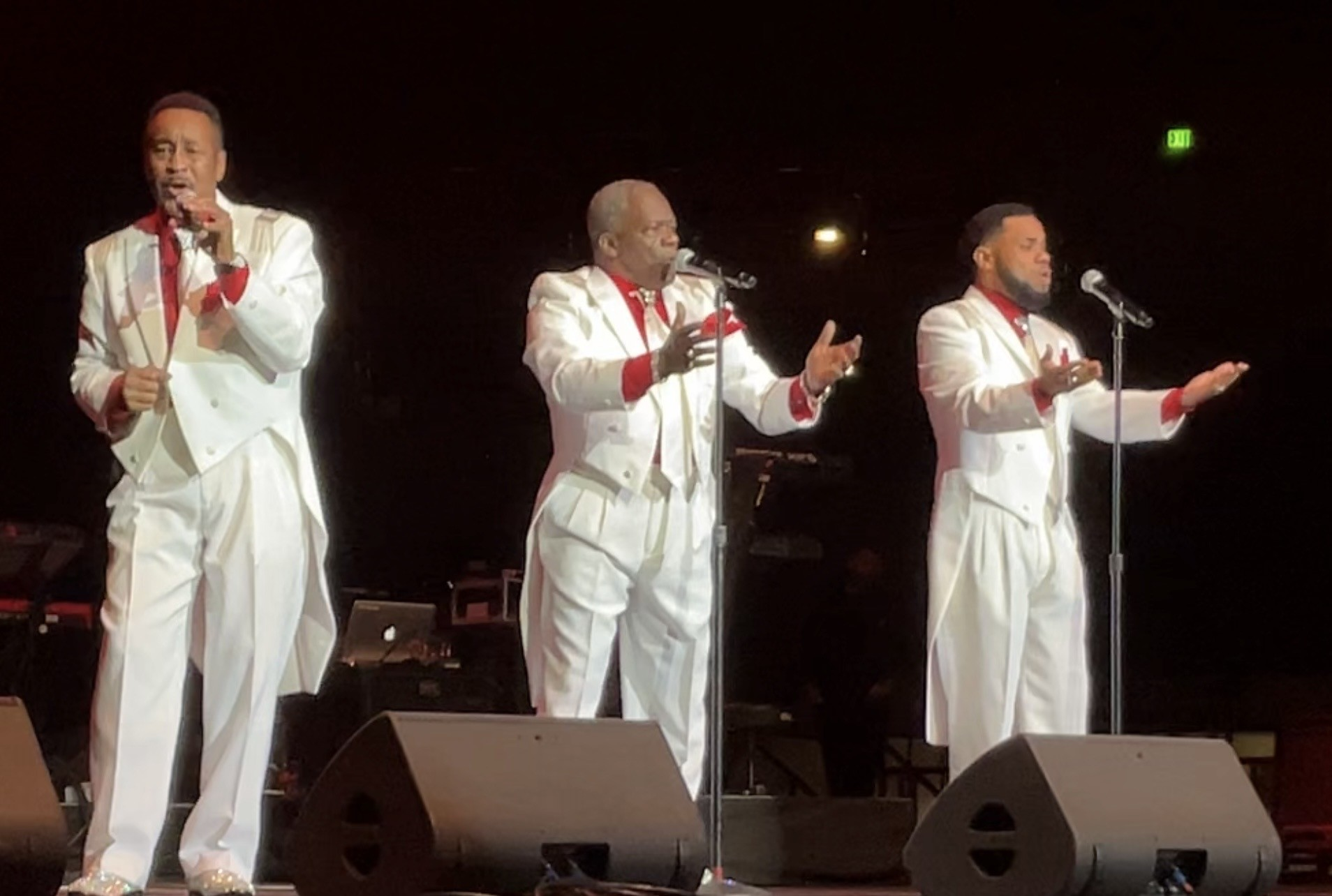
“The Temprees” performing at the “Valentine Super Love Jam” on Friday, February 13, 2026 at the Selland Arena, Fresno, CA.

Originally formed as The Lovemen, the trio—lead singer Jasper "Jabbo" Phillips, whose powerful falsetto featured on most of their recordings, Harold "Scotty" Scott and Deljuan "Del" Calvin—met in the mid-1960s, when they were in junior high school, along with Larry Dodson, future lead singer of The Bar-Kays. The group was first signed to Stax Records in 1970 by producer Josephine "Jo" Bridges on her 'We Produce' Stax subsidiary. Later, with the collapse of Stax, they moved briefly in 1976 to Epic Records, a subsidiary of CBS, for two singles.

The band released three albums, Lovemen, Love Maze, and Temprees 3 on We Produce, mainly produced by Bridges, Stax executive/producer and former Motown engineer Tom Nixon and arranger-producer Lester Snell, a regular collaborator with Isaac Hayes. Their catalog was later re-released on CD, along with a greatest hits compilation entitled, The Best of the Temprees.

The trio's last hit was 1976's "I Found Love On A Disco Floor," their first release on Epic, again produced by Jo Bridges.

The band reunited in the 1990s and released a fourth original album on the small Memphis label, High Stacks in 2000 called "Because We Love You," produced by the group. Lead singer Jasper "Jabbo" Phillips died on February 21, 2001. Jabbo was replaced by Del's brother Jerry "JC" Calvin. The Temprees' rendition of "Dedicated to the One I Love" was one of 50 songs featured in the double album box set, Stax 50th Anniversary Celebration in 2007. This song was the group's biggest seller, reaching # 17 R&B and #93 pop in 1972. In 2016, they released their fifth studio album From The Heart, which also included a cover of Earth, Wind & Fire's "Reasons". Sometime before this album, JC Calvin was replaced by Solomon "Sol" Young, who was later replaced by current member Walter "Bo" Washington.

== Singles ==
=== On We Produce/Stax Records ===
- XPA-1801 "(Follow Her) Rules And Regulations" / "I'm For You, You For Me"
- XPA-1803 "I Love You, You Love Me" / "(Girl) I Love You"
- XPA-1805 "My Baby Love" / "If I Could Say What's On My Mind"
- XPA-1807 "Explain It To Her Mama" / "Love... Can Be So Wonderful"
- XPA-1808 "Dedicated To The One I Love" / "I Love You, You Love Me"
- XPA-1810 "A Thousand Miles Away" / "Chalk It Up To Experience"
- XPA-1811 "Love's Maze" / "Wrap Me In Love"
- XPA-1812 "At Last" / "Love... Can Be So Wonderful"
- XPA-1813 "You Make The Sunshine" / "You Make Me Love You"
- XPA-1814 "Mr Cool That Ain't Cool" / "Lovin' You Is So Easy"
- XPA-1815 "I Love, I Love" / "Your Love (Is All I Need)"
- XPA-1816 "Come And Get Your Love" / "I'll Live Her Life"

=== On Epic Records ===
- 8-50192 "I Found Love On A Disco Floor"/"There Ain't A Dream Been Dreamed"
- 8-50258 "I Dare You"/"Something's Gonna Happen"

== Albums (all on We Produce/Stax Records, except where noted) ==
- Lovemen (1972)
- Love Maze (1973)
- Temprees 3 (1974)
- The Best Of The Temprees (1984)
- Because We Love You (High Stacks Records) (2000)
- From The Heart (Point 3 Records) (2016)
