= List of Grammy Award ceremony locations =

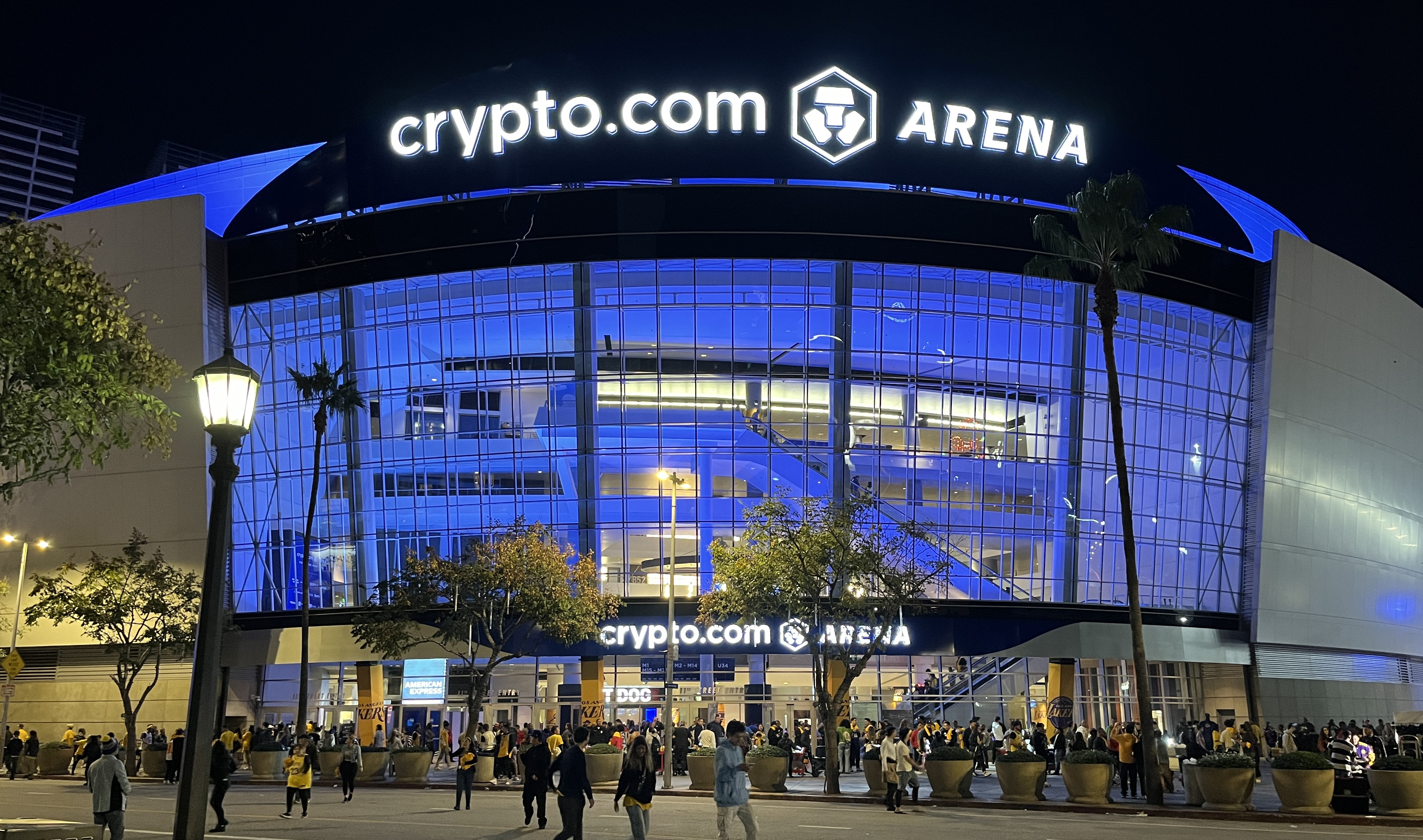
The Crypto.com Arena in Los Angeles is the current home of the Grammy Awards and has hosted twenty-three times.

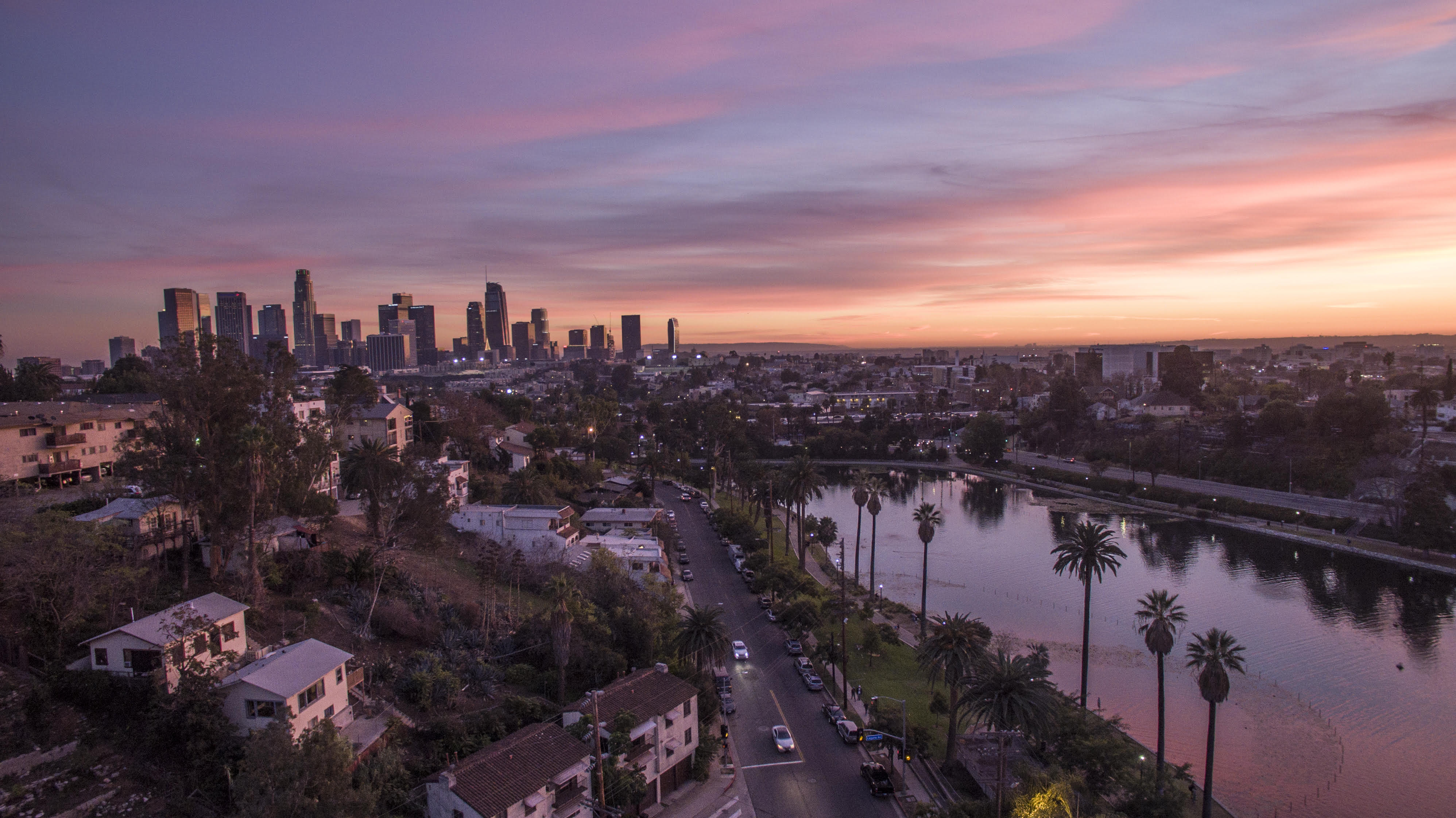
The Grammy Awards have historically been held in Los Angeles

The Grammy Awards have been held at multiple locations throughout the years. In 1971 the Grammy Awards had its first live telecast and therefore had its own sole venue each year for the telecast. From 1963 to 1970 the Academy aired a TV special annually called "The Best On Record" which highlighted the awards dinners. Since 2000, the Grammy Awards have been held most years at Crypto.com Arena located in Downtown Los Angeles.

== Non-televised era ==
From 1959 to 1970, awards dinners were held in the following locations simultaneously on the same day:

- 1959–1961: Los Angeles, Beverly Hills, and New York
- 1962–1964: Chicago, Los Angeles, and New York
- 1965–1970: Chicago, Los Angeles, Nashville, and New York

== Televised era ==
Grammy Award ceremonies have been televised live since 1971. The Crypto.com Arena in Los Angeles has hosted the most Grammy Award telecasts, having hosted twenty-two times. The Shrine Auditorium which hosted fifteen times, was surpassed by the Crypto.com Arena as the most frequent Grammy telecast venue in 2017. Los Angeles has held a total of 42 Grammy Award telecasts, with New York having hosted eleven times and Nashville and Las Vegas serving as host one time each.

=== Broadcasters ===
The Grammy Awards have aired primarily on CBS (and later including Paramount+) during its televised era. Starting in 2027, the awards will be broadcast on Disney platforms including ABC, Disney+, and Hulu as part of a ten-year deal.

== Ceremonies ==
Ceremony	Date	Venue	Venue City	Host	Network	Viewers (in millions)
1st Annual Grammy Awards	May 4, 1959	Various (including Beverly Hilton Hotel)	Beverly Hills & New York City	Mort Sahl	NBC	—N/a
2nd Annual Grammy Awards	November 29, 1959	Various (including Beverly Hilton Hotel)	Beverly Hills & New York City	Meredith Willson	NBC	—N/a
3rd Annual Grammy Awards	April 13, 1961	Various (including Beverly Hilton Hotel)	Beverly Hills & New York City	None	NBC	—N/a
4th Annual Grammy Awards	May 29, 1962	Various (including Beverly Hilton Hotel)	Chicago, Los Angeles & New York City	None	NBC	—N/a
5th Annual Grammy Awards	May 15, 1963	Various (including Beverly Hilton Hotel)	Chicago, Los Angeles & New York City	Frank Sinatra	NBC	—N/a
6th Annual Grammy Awards	May 12, 1964	Various (including Beverly Hilton Hotel)	Chicago, Los Angeles & New York City	None	NBC	—N/a
7th Annual Grammy Awards	April 13, 1965	Beverly Hilton Hotel	Beverly Hills	None	NBC	—N/a
8th Annual Grammy Awards	March 15, 1966	Various	Chicago, Los Angeles, Nashville and New York City	Jerry Lewis	NBC	—N/a
9th Annual Grammy Awards	March 2, 1967	Various	Chicago, Los Angeles, Nashville and New York City	None	NBC	—N/a
10th Annual Grammy Awards	February 29, 1968	Various	Chicago, Los Angeles, Nashville and New York City	None	NBC	—N/a
11th Annual Grammy Awards	March 12, 1969	Various	Chicago, Los Angeles, Nashville and New York City	None	NBC	—N/a
12th Annual Grammy Awards	March 11, 1970	Various	Chicago, Los Angeles, Nashville and New York City	None	NBC	—N/a
13th Annual Grammy Awards	March 16, 1971	Hollywood Palladium	Los Angeles	Andy Williams	ABC	—N/a
14th Annual Grammy Awards	March 15, 1972	Madison Square Garden	New York City	Andy Williams	ABC	—N/a
15th Annual Grammy Awards	March 3, 1973	Tennessee Theatre	Nashville	Andy Williams	CBS	—N/a
16th Annual Grammy Awards	March 2, 1974	Hollywood Palladium	Los Angeles	Andy Williams	CBS	—N/a
17th Annual Grammy Awards	March 1, 1975	Uris Theater	New York City	Andy Williams	CBS	—N/a
18th Annual Grammy Awards	February 28, 1976	Hollywood Palladium	Los Angeles	Andy Williams	CBS	—N/a
19th Annual Grammy Awards	February 19, 1977	Hollywood Palladium	Los Angeles	Andy Williams	CBS	28.86
20th Annual Grammy Awards	February 23, 1978	Shrine Auditorium	Los Angeles	John Denver	CBS	—N/a
21st Annual Grammy Awards	February 15, 1979	Shrine Auditorium	Los Angeles	John Denver	CBS	31.31
22nd Annual Grammy Awards	February 27, 1980	Shrine Auditorium	Los Angeles	Kenny Rogers	CBS	32.39
23rd Annual Grammy Awards	February 25, 1981	Radio City Music Hall	New York City	Paul Simon	CBS	28.57
24th Annual Grammy Awards	February 24, 1982	Shrine Auditorium	Los Angeles	John Denver	CBS	24.02
25th Annual Grammy Awards	February 23, 1983	Shrine Auditorium	Los Angeles	John Denver	CBS	30.86
26th Annual Grammy Awards	February 28, 1984	Shrine Auditorium	Los Angeles	John Denver	CBS	51.67
27th Annual Grammy Awards	February 26, 1985	Shrine Auditorium	Los Angeles	John Denver	CBS	37.12
28th Annual Grammy Awards	February 25, 1986	Shrine Auditorium	Los Angeles	Kenny Rogers	CBS	30.39
29th Annual Grammy Awards	February 24, 1987	Shrine Auditorium	Los Angeles	Billy Crystal	CBS	27.91
30th Annual Grammy Awards	March 2, 1988	Radio City Music Hall	New York City	Billy Crystal	CBS	32.76
31st Annual Grammy Awards	February 22, 1989	Shrine Auditorium	Los Angeles	Billy Crystal	CBS	23.57
32nd Annual Grammy Awards	February 21, 1990	Shrine Auditorium	Los Angeles	Garry Shandling	CBS	28.83
33rd Annual Grammy Awards	February 20, 1991	Radio City Music Hall	New York City	Garry Shandling	CBS	28.89
34th Annual Grammy Awards	February 25, 1992	Radio City Music Hall	New York City	Whoopi Goldberg	CBS	23.10
35th Annual Grammy Awards	February 24, 1993	Shrine Auditorium	Los Angeles	Garry Shandling	CBS	29.87
36th Annual Grammy Awards	March 1, 1994	Radio City Music Hall	New York City	Garry Shandling	CBS	23.69
37th Annual Grammy Awards	March 1, 1995	Shrine Auditorium	Los Angeles	Paul Reiser	CBS	17.27
38th Annual Grammy Awards	February 28, 1996	Shrine Auditorium	Los Angeles	Ellen DeGeneres	CBS	21.50
39th Annual Grammy Awards	February 26, 1997	Madison Square Garden	New York City	Ellen DeGeneres	CBS	19.21
40th Annual Grammy Awards	February 25, 1998	Radio City Music Hall	New York City	Kelsey Grammer	CBS	25.04
41st Annual Grammy Awards	February 24, 1999	Shrine Auditorium	Los Angeles	Rosie O'Donnell	CBS	24.88
42nd Annual Grammy Awards	February 23, 2000	Staples Center	Los Angeles	Rosie O'Donnell	CBS	27.79
43rd Annual Grammy Awards	February 21, 2001	Staples Center	Los Angeles	Jon Stewart	CBS	26.65
44th Annual Grammy Awards	February 27, 2002	Staples Center	Los Angeles	Jon Stewart	CBS	18.96
45th Annual Grammy Awards	February 23, 2003	Madison Square Garden	New York City	None	CBS	24.82
46th Annual Grammy Awards	February 8, 2004	Staples Center	Los Angeles	None	CBS	26.29
47th Annual Grammy Awards	February 13, 2005	Staples Center	Los Angeles	Queen Latifah	CBS	18.80
48th Annual Grammy Awards	February 8, 2006	Staples Center	Los Angeles	None	CBS	17.00
49th Annual Grammy Awards	February 11, 2007	Staples Center	Los Angeles	None	CBS	20.05
50th Annual Grammy Awards	February 10, 2008	Staples Center	Los Angeles	None	CBS	17.18
51st Annual Grammy Awards	February 8, 2009	Staples Center	Los Angeles	None	CBS	19.04
52nd Annual Grammy Awards	January 31, 2010	Staples Center	Los Angeles	None	CBS	25.80
53rd Annual Grammy Awards	February 13, 2011	Staples Center	Los Angeles	None	CBS	26.55
54th Annual Grammy Awards	February 12, 2012	Staples Center	Los Angeles	LL Cool J	CBS	39.91
55th Annual Grammy Awards	February 10, 2013	Staples Center	Los Angeles	LL Cool J	CBS	28.37
56th Annual Grammy Awards	January 26, 2014	Staples Center	Los Angeles	LL Cool J	CBS	28.51
57th Annual Grammy Awards	February 8, 2015	Staples Center	Los Angeles	LL Cool J	CBS	25.30
58th Annual Grammy Awards	February 15, 2016	Staples Center	Los Angeles	LL Cool J	CBS	24.95
59th Annual Grammy Awards	February 12, 2017	Staples Center	Los Angeles	James Corden	CBS	26.05
60th Annual Grammy Awards	January 28, 2018	Madison Square Garden	New York City	James Corden	CBS	19.80
61st Annual Grammy Awards	February 10, 2019	Staples Center	Los Angeles	Alicia Keys	CBS	19.88
62nd Annual Grammy Awards	January 26, 2020	Staples Center	Los Angeles	Alicia Keys	CBS	18.70
63rd Annual Grammy Awards	March 14, 2021	Los Angeles Convention Center	Los Angeles	Trevor Noah	CBS	8.8
64th Annual Grammy Awards	April 3, 2022	MGM Grand Garden Arena	Las Vegas	Trevor Noah	CBS	9.6
65th Annual Grammy Awards	February 5, 2023	Crypto.com Arena	Los Angeles	Trevor Noah	CBS; Paramount+	12.4
66th Annual Grammy Awards	February 4, 2024	Crypto.com Arena	Los Angeles	Trevor Noah	CBS; Paramount+	16.9
67th Annual Grammy Awards	February 2, 2025	Crypto.com Arena	Los Angeles	Trevor Noah	CBS; Paramount+	15.4
68th Annual Grammy Awards	February 1, 2026	Crypto.com Arena	Los Angeles	Trevor Noah	CBS; Paramount+	14.4
69th Annual Grammy Awards	February 7, 2027	Crypto.com Arena	Los Angeles	TBA	ABC; Hulu; Disney+	TBA

== Multiple ceremonies locations ==
=== Most frequent venues ===
With twenty-three telecasts hosted, Crypto.com Arena has hosted the most Grammy telecasts. The Shrine Auditorium hosted fifteen times between 1978 and 1999.

While Crypto.com Arena hosts the main telecast, which is broadcast on CBS, the premiere ceremony (also known as the Pre-Telecast) is held at the neighboring Peacock Theater, which is just across the street from the Crypto.com Arena. The MusiCares Person of the Year tribute is held at the adjacent Los Angeles Convention Center two days prior to the Grammy Awards.

Rank	1st	2nd	3rd	4th	6th	7th
Venue	Crypto.com Arena	Shrine Auditorium	Beverly Hilton Hotel	Radio City Music Hall	Hollywood Palladium; Madison Square Garden	Tennessee Theatre; Gershwin Theatre; Los Angeles Convention Center; MGM Grand Garden Arena
Number of Telecasts	23	15	7	6	4	1

==== Gallery ====
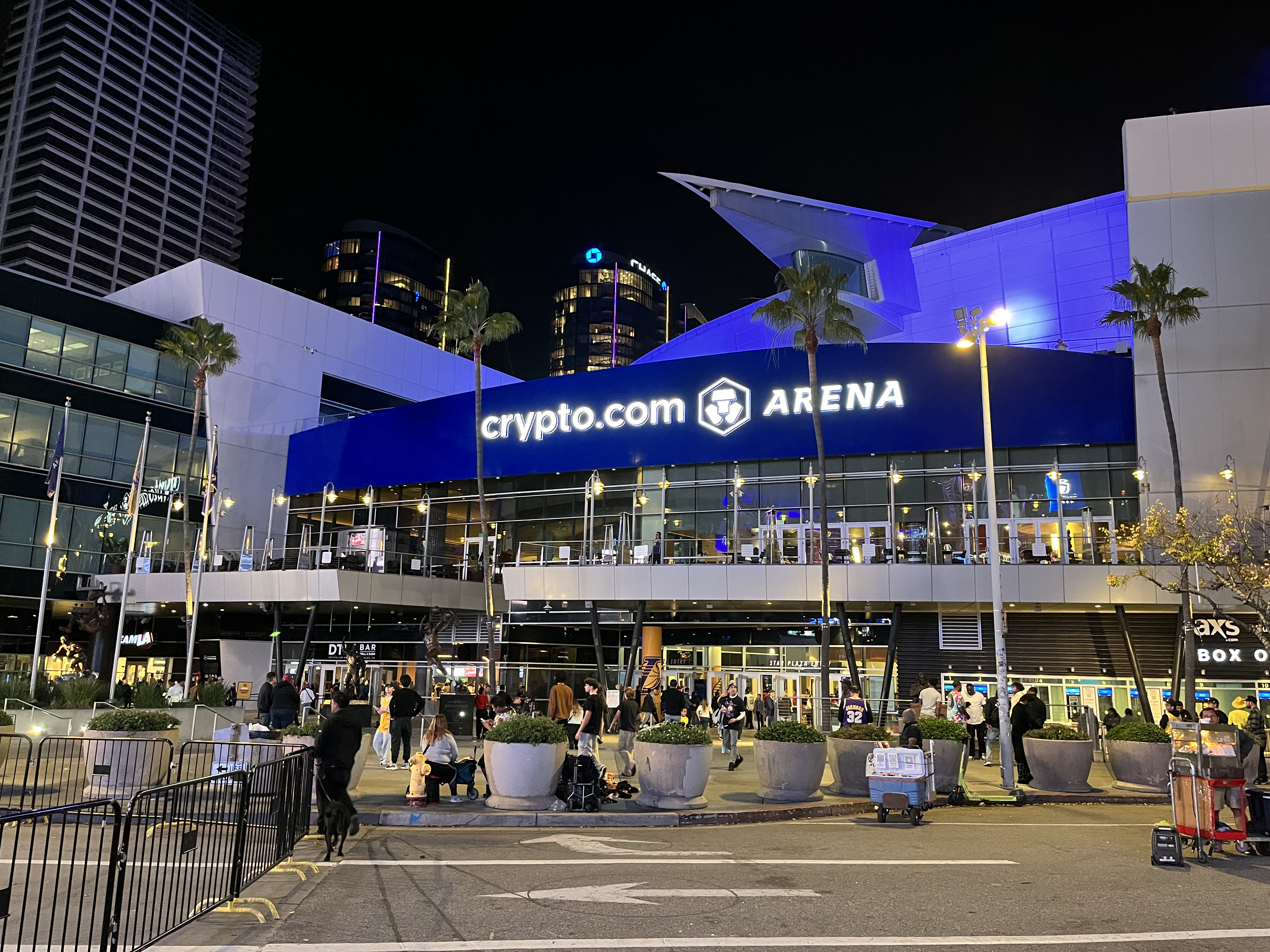
The Crypto.com Arena has hosted twenty-three Grammy telecasts

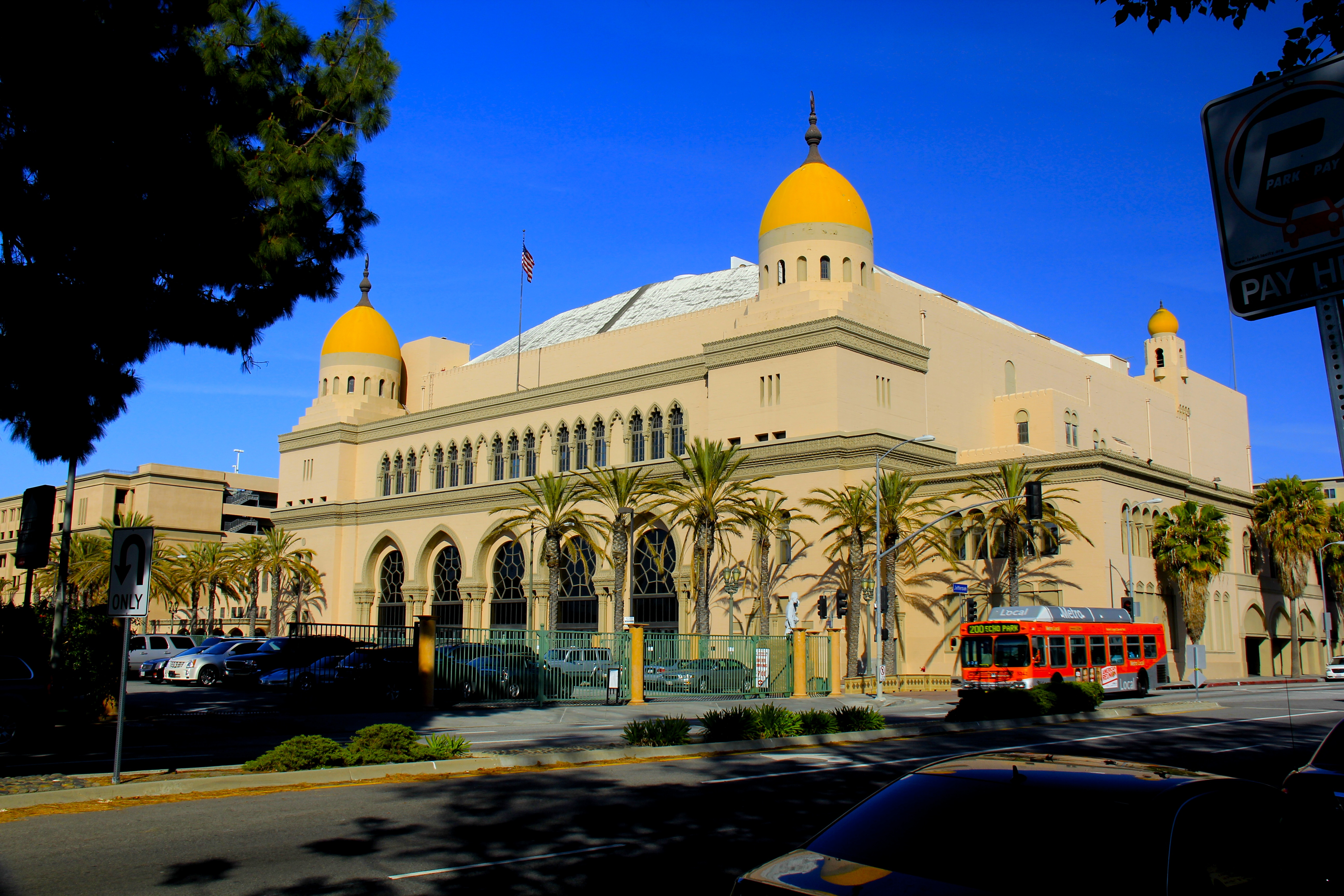
The Shrine Auditorium has hosted fifteen Grammy telecasts

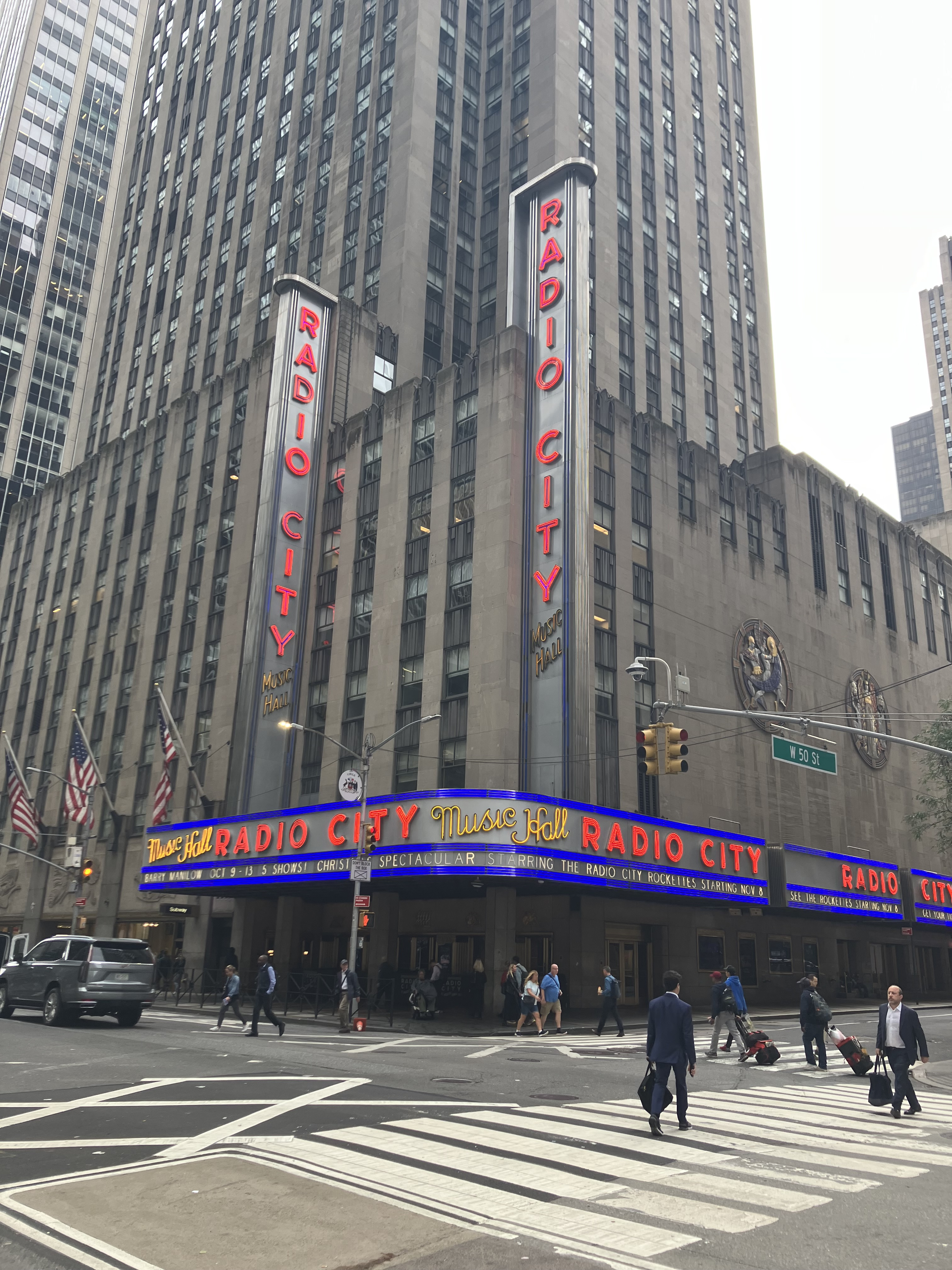
Radio City Music Hall has hosted six Grammy telecasts

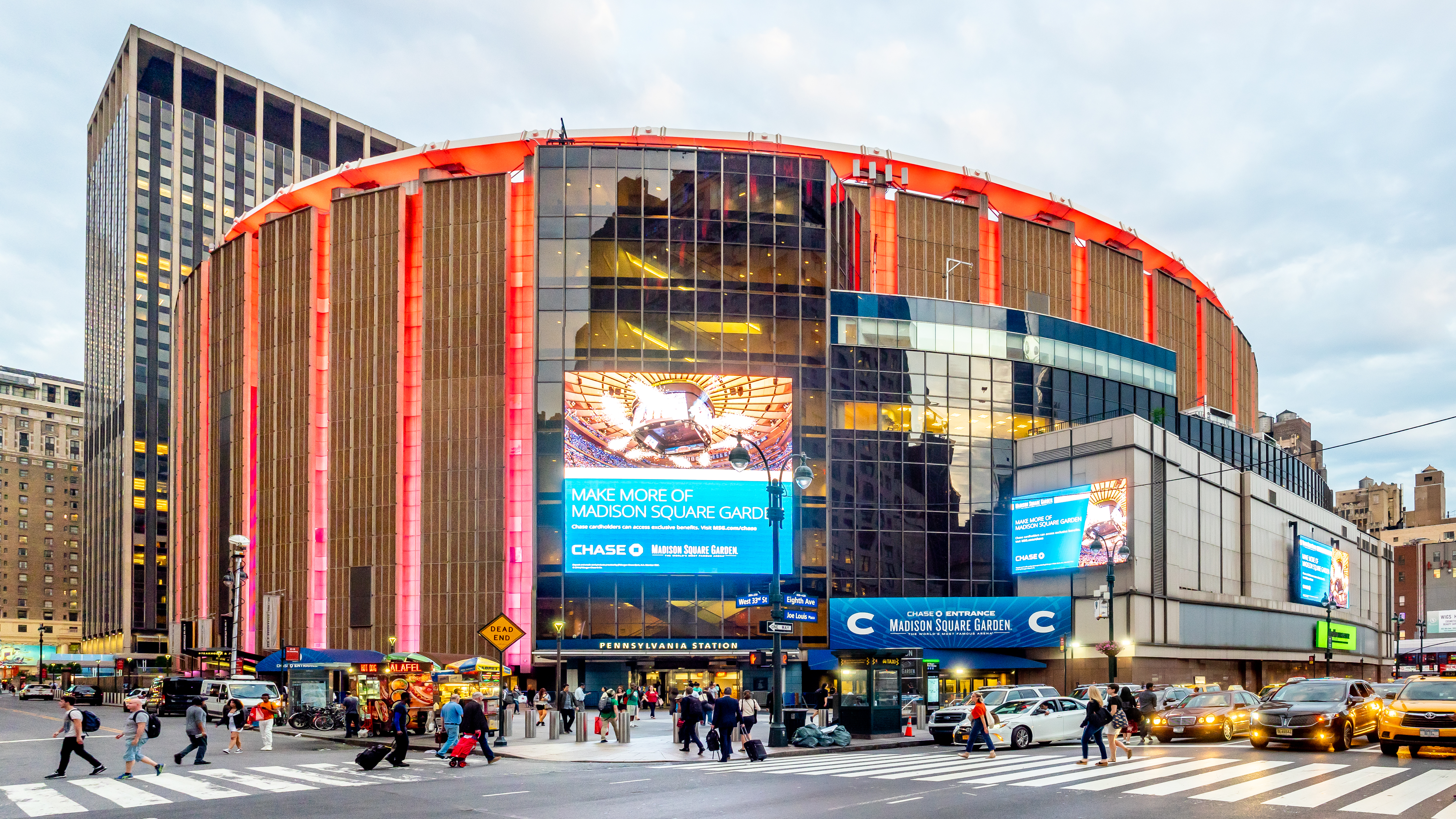
Madison Square Garden has hosted four Grammy telecasts

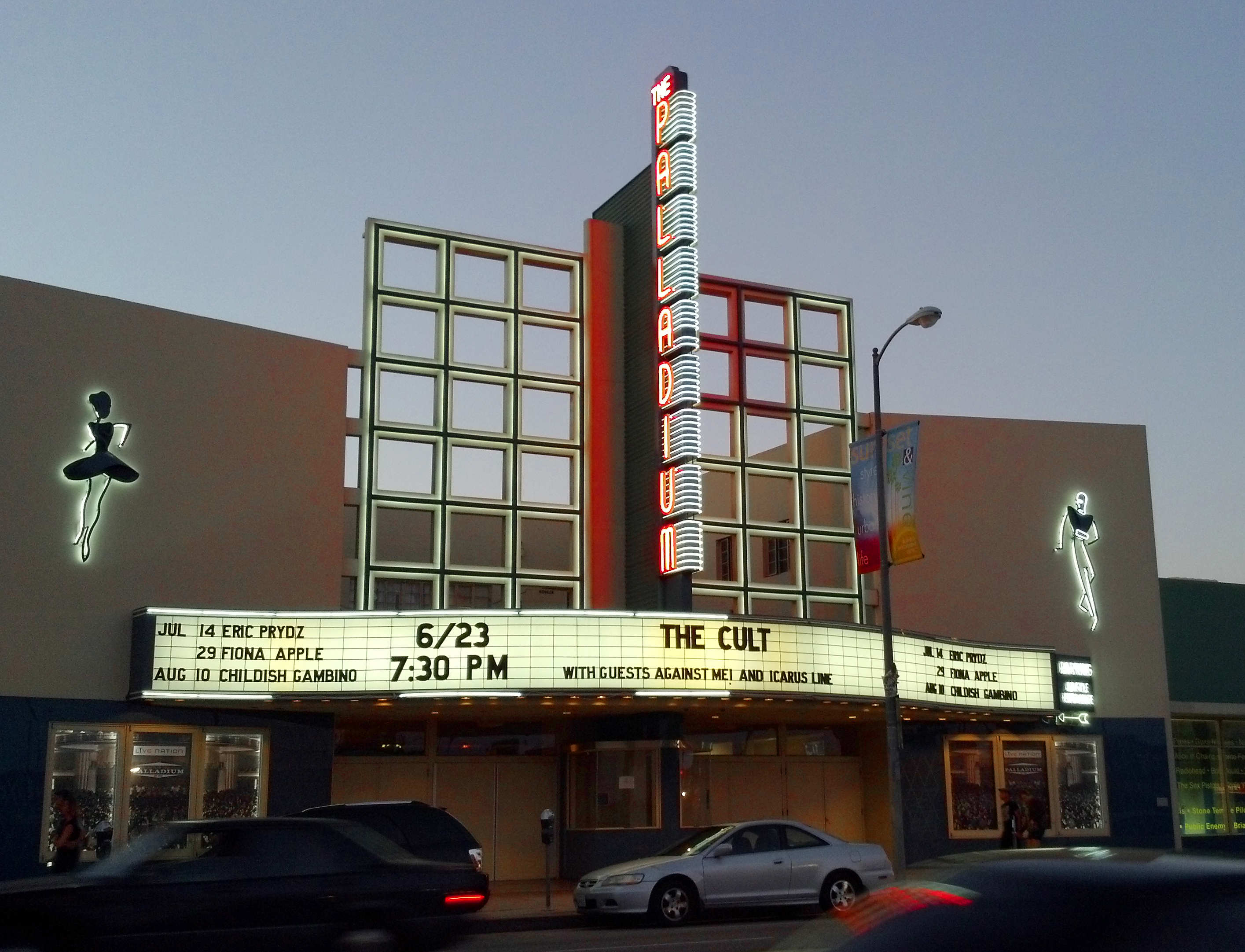
The Hollywood Palladium has hosted four Grammy telecasts

=== Most frequent host cities ===
Los Angeles has held a total of 43 Grammy telecasts, for a total of 54 including the pre-broadcast era years prior to 1971.

Rank	1st	2nd	3rd	4th
City	Los Angeles, CA	New York City, NY	Chicago, IL	Nashville, TN; Las Vegas, NV
Number of Non-Televised Era Award Ceremonies	12	11	6	0
Number of Telecasts	43	11	0	1
Total Number of Times Hosted	55	22	6	1

==== Gallery ====
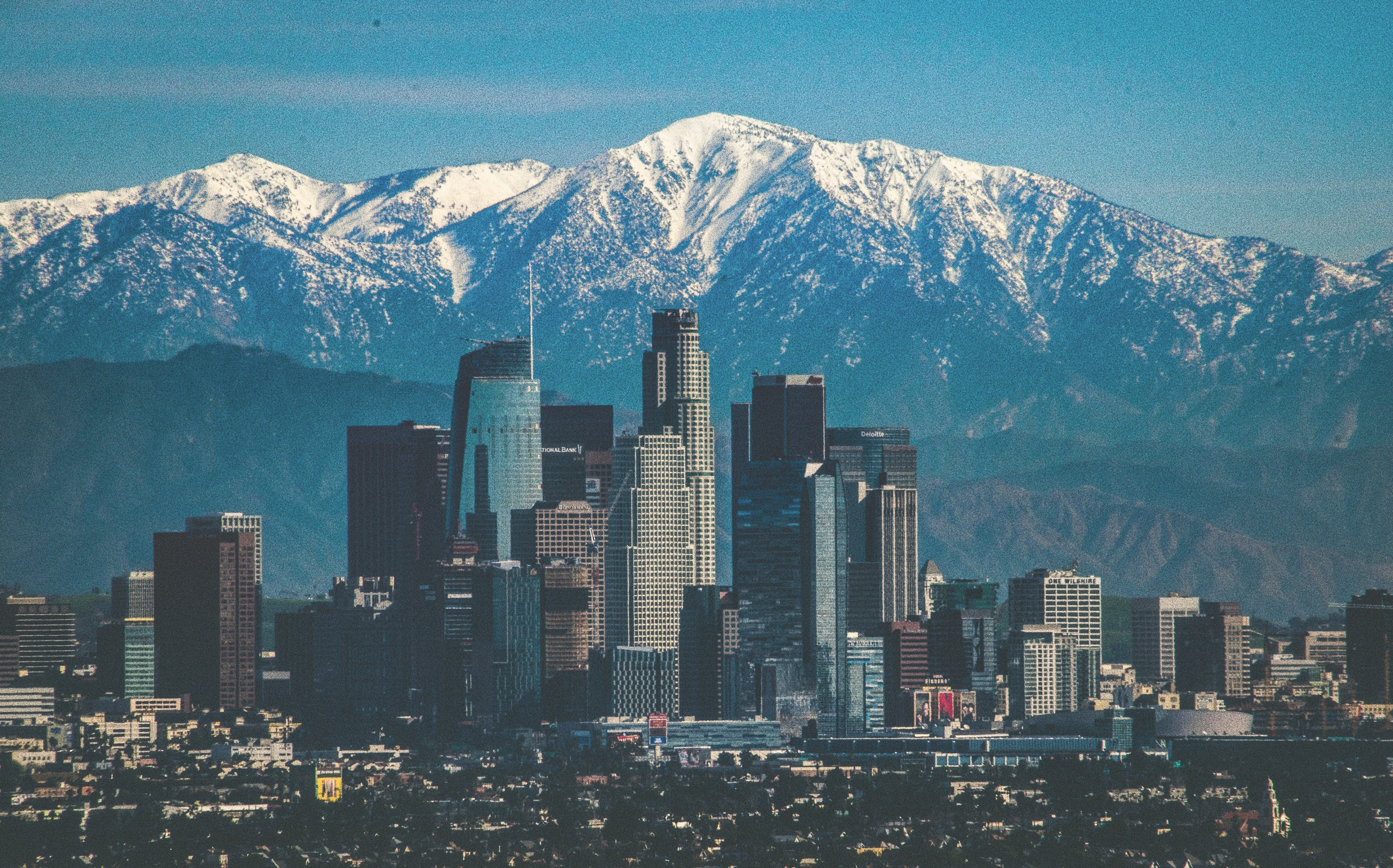
Los Angeles has hosted a total of forty-three Grammy Award telecasts

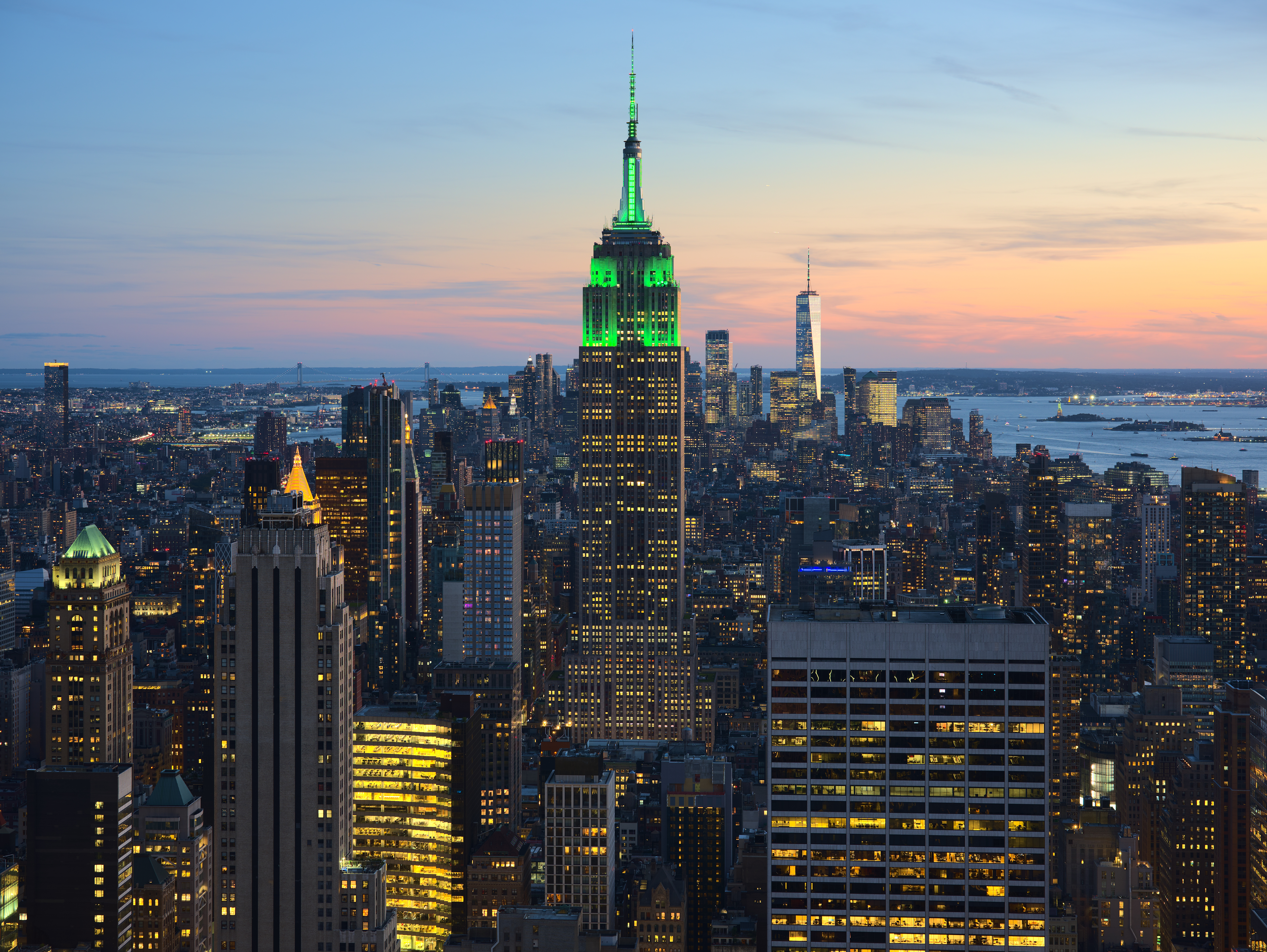
New York City has hosted eleven Grammy telecasts

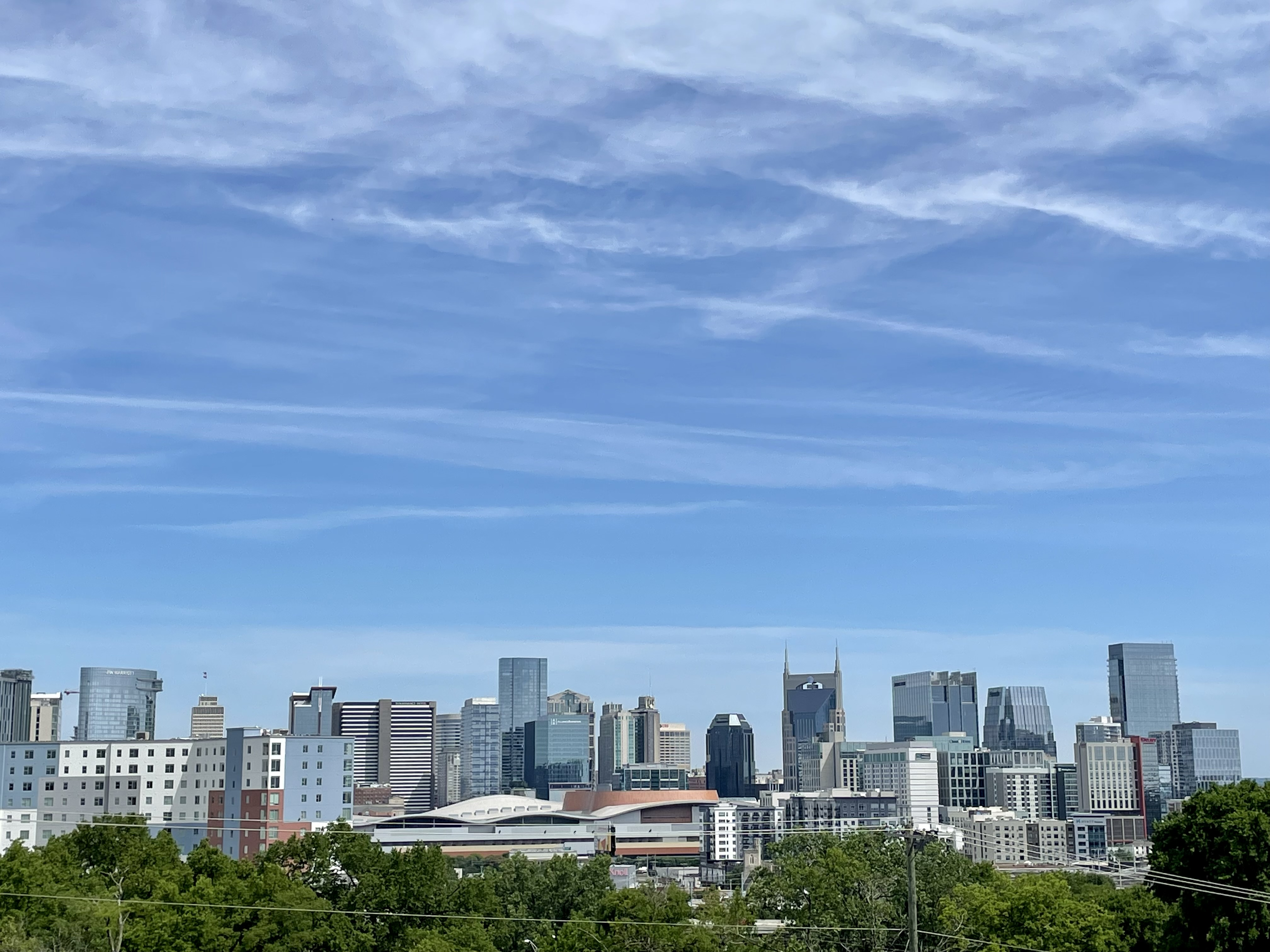
Nashville hosted one Grammy telecast in 1973

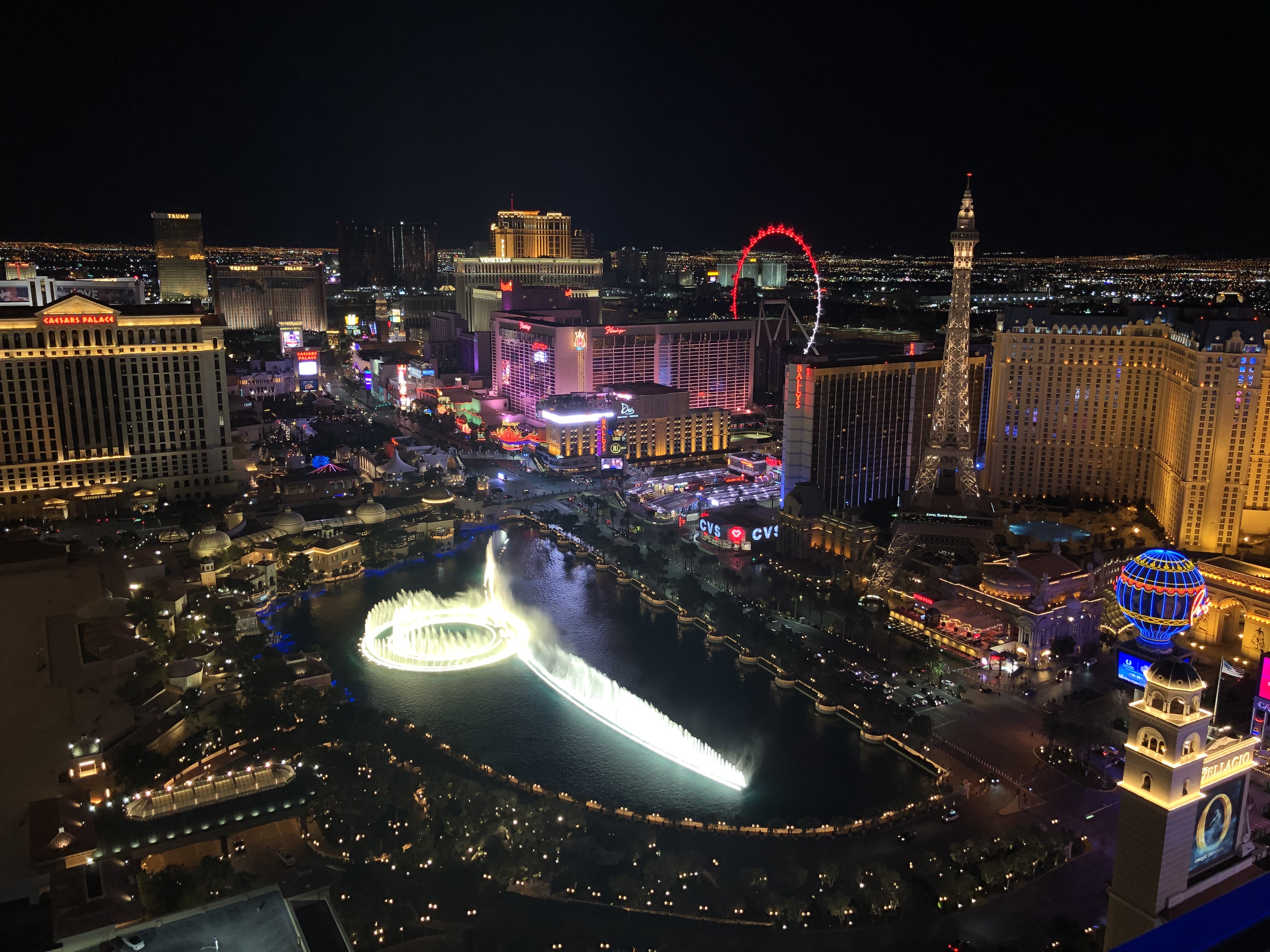
Las Vegas hosted one Grammy telecast in 2022

== Multiple ceremonies hosted ==
The following individuals have hosted (or co-hosted) the Grammy Awards ceremony on two or more occasions.

Host	Number of Ceremonies
Andy Williams	7
John Denver	6
Trevor Noah	6
LL Cool J	5
Garry Shandling	4
Billy Crystal	3
James Corden	2
Ellen DeGeneres	2
Alicia Keys	2
Rosie O'Donnell	2
Kenny Rogers	2
Jon Stewart	2

== See also ==
- List of Latin Grammy Award ceremony locations
