= MGM Grand Garden Arena =

Arena on the Las Vegas Strip in Nevada, United States

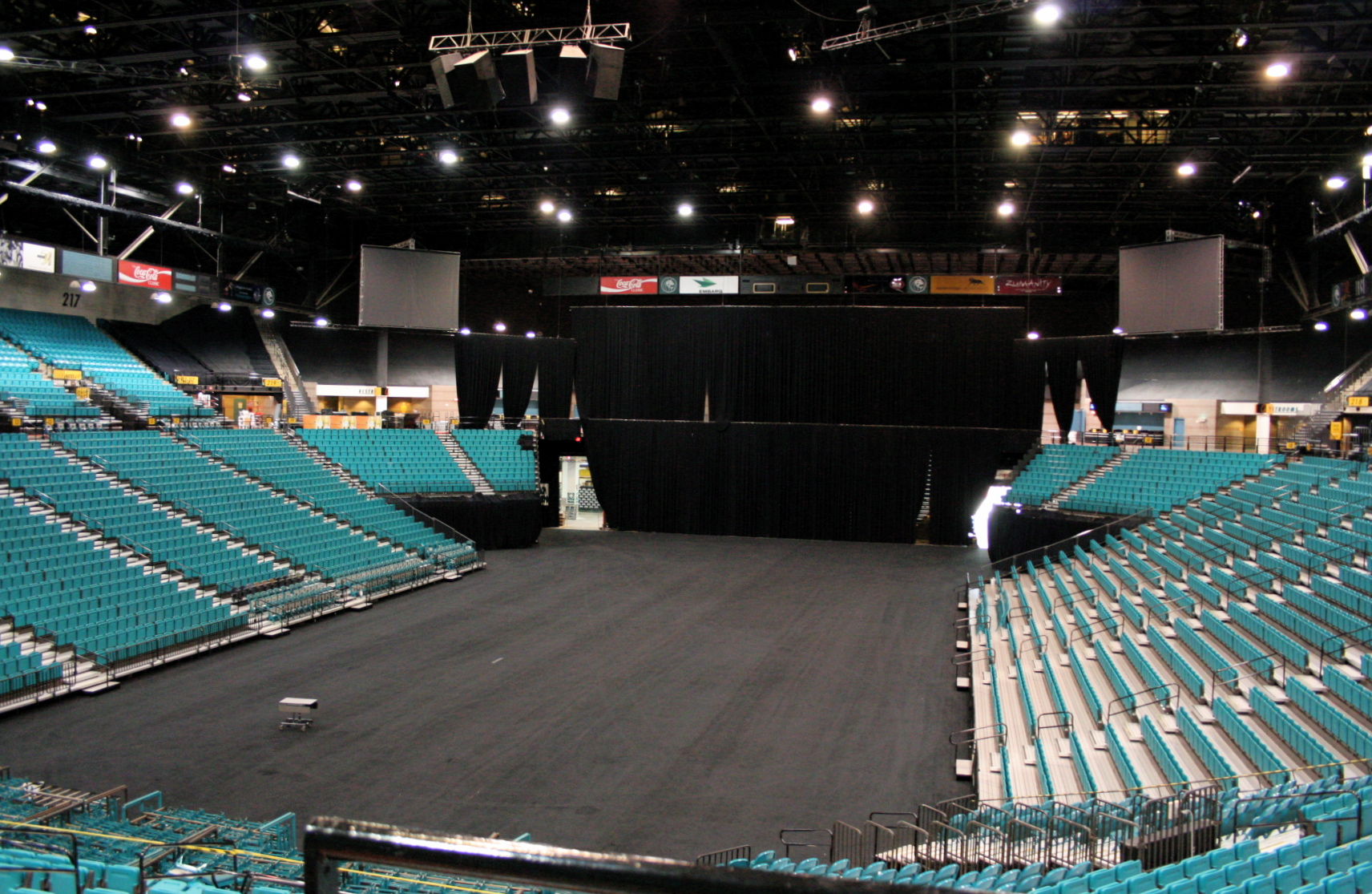
- Concert bowl and seating c. 2008

- Location in Nevada Location in the United States Location in North America
- Interactive map of MGM Grand Garden Arena
- Address: 3799 South Las Vegas Boulevard
- Location: Paradise, Nevada, U.S.
- Coordinates: 36°6′17.31″N 115°10′7.01″W
- Owner: MGM Resorts International
- Operator: MGM Resorts International
- Capacity: 15,020 – permanent seating 17,000 – with bleachers
- Public transit: Las Vegas Monorail at MGM Grand

Construction
- Groundbreaking: October 7, 1991; 34 years ago
- Opened: December 31, 1993; 32 years ago
- Renovated: 1997 and 2000
- Cost: $28.4 million
- Architect: Ellerbe Becket
- General contractor: Taylor International Corporation

Tenants
- Las Vegas Dustdevils (CISL) (1994); Las Vegas Sting (AFL) (1994)

Website
- Venue Website

The MGM Grand Garden Arena is a 17,000-seat multi-purpose arena within the MGM Grand resort, located on the Las Vegas Strip in Paradise, Nevada, United States. The venue opened on December 31, 1993, with a concert by Barbra Streisand, and subsequent concerts by Luther Vandross, Anita Mui and Janet Jackson.

== Sporting events ==
MGM Grand Garden Arena, the Thomas & Mack Center and the Mandalay Bay Events Center were the main sports arenas in the Las Vegas Valley until 2016, when the MGM co-owned T-Mobile Arena opened.

=== Professional wrestling ===
From 1996 to 2000, it hosted World Championship Wrestling's Halloween Havoc events. The UWF television event Blackjack Brawl was held at the venue in 1994.

On May 25, 2019, it hosted All Elite Wrestling's inaugural event, Double or Nothing (2019). Tickets for the event sold out in four minutes. It was originally scheduled to host Double or Nothing (2020) on May 23, 2020, and the May 27 episode of AEW Dynamite, but was moved due to the COVID-19 pandemic.

It hosted Money in the Bank on July 2, 2022, which was originally scheduled to be held at the larger Allegiant Stadium. This marked the first WWE pay-per-view to have taken place at the arena.

The venue will host Lucha Libre AAA Worldwide's (AAA) Triplemanía 34 (Night 1), which was originally scheduled to take place at the smaller Luxor Las Vegas. The venue change was due to the previously sold-out event experiencing high demand.

=== Combat sports ===
The arena is well known for numerous professional boxing superfights, such as Mike Tyson vs. Evander Holyfield and II, Manny Pacquiao vs. Keith Thurman, Manny Pacquiao vs. Adrien Broner, Manny Pacquiao vs. Juan Manuel Márquez IV, Floyd Mayweather Jr. vs. Canelo Álvarez, Deontay Wilder vs. Tyson Fury II, Canelo Álvarez vs. Caleb Plant and José Luis Castillo vs. Floyd Mayweather Jr.

On September 7, 1996, the Bruce Seldon vs. Mike Tyson bout was held here; later that night, rapper Tupac Shakur (who attended the fight) was shot in a drive-by attack. He succumbed to his injuries six days later.

The arena held 42 Ultimate Fighting Championship mixed martial arts events, starting with UFC 34 in 2001 and ending with The Ultimate Fighter 23 Finale in 2016. UFC currently uses the T-Mobile Arena for major events.

On May 2, 2015, Floyd Mayweather Jr. defended his WBA (Unified), WBC, and The Ring world welterweight titles in a highly anticipated unification fight against fellow superstar Manny Pacquiao, who defended the WBO and IBO world welterweight titles. After 12 rounds, Mayweather won by unanimous decision, becoming the unified welterweight champion of the world.

=== Professional sports ===
In 1994, the Las Vegas Dustdevils, an indoor soccer team in the Continental Indoor Soccer League played one season at the arena. It also served as the pre-season home for select Los Angeles Kings games against the Colorado Avalanche, Phoenix Coyotes and San Jose Sharks until 2015, known as Frozen Fury. Two more games occurred at the new T-Mobile Arena before the launch of the NHL's newest team, the Vegas Golden Knights, who went on to play in the NHL's Stanley Cup Playoffs within their first season.

On October 24, 2014, it held an NBA preseason game between the Los Angeles Lakers and the Sacramento Kings. They returned for another match on October 13, 2015.

=== College sports ===
During the 1990s, the arena served as the site for the WAC women's volleyball tournament.

On March 13, 2012, it was announced that the Pac-12 men's basketball tournament would take place at the arena from at least 2013 through 2016 and then to T-Mobile Arena in 2017 until 2020.

From 2014 to 2017, the MGM Grand Garden Arena hosted the Roman Main Event, then called The MGM Resorts Main Event, an 8-team college basketball tournament held during Monday and Wednesday of Thanksgiving week of NCAA Division I men's basketball season.

Starting in 2025, the arena will host eight First Round and four Quarterfinal games of the College Basketball Crown.

=== Bull riding ===
The Professional Bull Riders (PBR) held its annual World Finals event at the MGM Arena from 1994 to 1998 before moving to the Thomas & Mack Center in 1999 and then to T-Mobile Arena in 2016. The PBR later returned on June 11 and 12, 2021 for an Unleash the Beast Series event in its first visit to the MGM Arena since 1998.

== Award shows ==
The arena has frequently hosted various awards shows. It was the site of the Billboard Music Awards from 1997 to 2006, from 2011 to 2015 and in 2018, 2019 and 2022.

It was a consistent site for the Academy of Country Music Awards and served as host from 2006 to 2019, with the exception of 2015 and 2017.

The MGM Grand Garden Arena has hosted the Latin Grammy Awards six times: 2014, 2015, from 2017 to 2019, and in 2021. The arena will host the upcoming 26th Annual Latin Grammy Awards on November 13, 2025. The MGM Grand Garden Arena is one of three venues in Las Vegas that have hosted the Latin Grammy Awards which are typically held in Las Vegas.

The arena hosted the 64th Annual Grammy Awards on April 3, 2022, marking the first time the Grammy Awards were held in Las Vegas. The ceremony was originally scheduled to be held on January 31, 2022, at the Crypto.com Arena in Los Angeles; however, the Recording Academy postponed the ceremony indefinitely due to health and safety concerns related to the COVID-19 Omicron variant. The MGM Grand Garden Arena was chosen due to resultant scheduling conflicts with the Crypto.com Arena.

== Other events ==
=== Phish Halloween ===
Improvisational jam band Phish has hosted several significant halloween concerts at the venue. On October 31, 2014, they performed Chilling, Thrilling Sounds of the Haunted House with original instrumental music to accompany the album as their "musical costume" for the second set of their Halloween night show at the venue. Following that performance, the band has made their interpretation of "Martian Monster" a regular part of their concert repertoire and have performed it at over 25 subsequent concerts. On October 31, 2016, the band covered David Bowie's The Rise and Fall of Ziggy Stardust and the Spiders from Mars in its entirety as their musical costume for the evening. On October 31, 2018, the band performed a set of all-new original material that they promoted as a "cover" of í rokk by "Kasvot Växt", a fictional 1980s Scandinavian progressive rock band they had created. On October 31, 2021, they performed the album Get More Down by another fictional band of their creation, "Sci-Fi Soldier."

== Concerts ==
Entertainment events at MGM Grand Garden Arena
| Date | Nationalities | Artists | Events | Supporting Acts | Attendance | Box Office |
1994
| January 1 | United States | Barbra Streisand | Barbra. Live at the MGM | —N/a | 25,120 | $13,560,750 |
| February 12 | Hong Kong | Anita Mui | Anita Mui One Night Only | —N/a | —N/a | —N/a |
| April 16 | United States | Janet Jackson | janet. World Tour | —N/a | —N/a | —N/a |
| October 14 | United Kingdom | The Rolling Stones | Voodoo Lounge Tour | Buddy Guy | 21,674 / 21,674 (100%) | $4,184,050 |
| October 15 | United Kingdom | The Rolling Stones | Voodoo Lounge Tour | Buddy Guy | 21,674 / 21,674 (100%) | $4,184,050 |
1996
| August 2 | United States | Gloria Estefan | Evolution World Tour | —N/a | —N/a | —N/a |
| November 2 | United States | Kiss | Alive/Worldwide Tour | —N/a | 13,030 / 13,030 (100%) | $587,330 |
1997
| May 10 | United States | Tina Turner | Wildest Dreams Tour | Cyndi Lauper | 13,267 / 13,267 (100%) | $448,485 |
| November 14 | United Kingdom | The Bee Gees | One Night Only Tour | | —N/a | |
| November 22 | United Kingdom | The Rolling Stones | Bridges to Babylon Tour | Jamiroquai | 12,750/ 12,750 (100%) | $2,925,800 |
| December 14 | United States | Aerosmith | Nine Lives Tour | —N/a | | |
1998
| February 14 | United Kingdom | Elton John | Big Picture Tour | —N/a | 14,126 / 14,126 | $1,425,200 |
| May 9 | Taiwan | A-Mei | A-Mei Mother's Day Concert | | | |
1999
| April 16 | United Kingdom | The Rolling Stones | No Security Tour | Sugar Ray | 12,566 / 12,566 | $2,780,450 |
| September 25 | United Kingdom | Elton John | Medusa Tour | —N/a | 8,500 / 8,500 | $1,760,020 |
2000
| April 29 | United States | Tina Turner | Twenty Four Seven Tour | Lionel Richie; Janice Robinson | —N/a | |
| May 27 | United States | Bruce Springsteen & The E Street Band | Reunion Tour | —N/a | | |
| June 17 | United Kingdom | Roger Waters | In the Flesh Tour 2000 | | | |
| July 1 | United States | All That | All That! Music and More Festival | Hoku, B*Witched, LFO and Blaque | —N/a | |
| August 4 | United States | Britney Spears | Oops!... I Did It Again Tour | Mikaila; Josh Keaton; Aaron Carter; A–Teens | —N/a | |
| October 22 | United States | Pearl Jam | Binaural Tour | Supergrass | —N/a | |
| November 18 | United States | Tina Turner | Twenty Four Seven Tour | Joe Cocker | —N/a | |
| November 19 | United States | Tina Turner | Twenty Four Seven Tour | Joe Cocker | —N/a | |
2001
| August 18 | United States | Aerosmith | Just Push Play Tour | —N/a | | |
| September 1 | United States | Madonna | Drowned World Tour | —N/a | 29,587 / 29,587 | $6,503,950 |
| September 2 | United States | Madonna | Drowned World Tour | —N/a | 29,587 / 29,587 | $6,503,950 |
| November 17 | United States | Britney Spears | Dream Within a Dream Tour | O-Town; Mpress | 24,638 / 24,638 | $1,561,214 |
| November 18 | United States | Britney Spears | Dream Within a Dream Tour | O-Town; Mpress | 24,638 / 24,638 | $1,561,214 |
2002
| April 23 | United States | Green Day; Blink-182 | Pop Disaster Tour | —N/a | | |
| September 21 | Canada | Rush | Vapor Trails Tour | —N/a | | |
| November 9 | United States | Aerosmith | Girls of Summer Tour | Kid Rock; Run DMC | | |
| November 30 | United States | The Rolling Stones | Licks Tour | Lifehouse | —N/a | |
| December 25 | Taiwan | Jay Chou | The One World Tour | —N/a | | |
2003
| February 8 | United Kingdom | The Rolling Stones | Licks Tour | Susan Tedeschi | —N/a | |
| June 6 | United States | Pearl Jam | Riot Act Tour | Idlewild | —N/a | |
| October 24 | United States | Aerosmith; Kiss | AeroKiss Tour | —N/a | 13,000 | —N/a |
| October 25 | United States | Aerosmith; Kiss | AeroKiss Tour | —N/a | 10,000 | —N/a |
2004
| March 6 | United States | Britney Spears | The Onyx Hotel Tour | Kelis; Skye Sweetnam | 13,297 / 13,297 | $1,075,105 |
| May 29 | United States | Madonna | Re-Invention Tour | —N/a | 28,341 / 28,341 | $7,005,548 |
| May 30 | United States | Madonna | Re-Invention Tour | —N/a | 28,341 / 28,341 | $7,005,548 |
| December 25 | Taiwan | S.H.E | Fantasy Land World Tour | —N/a | | |
2005
| November 4 | Ireland | U2 | Vertigo Tour | Damian Marley | 31,863 / 31,863 | $3,864,843 |
| November 5 | Ireland | U2 | Vertigo Tour | Damian Marley | 31,863 / 31,863 | $3,864,843 |
| November 18 | United Kingdom | The Rolling Stones | A Bigger Bang Tour | Jason Mraz | 13,898 / 13,898 (100%) | $4,053,289 |
2006
| February 18 | United States | Aerosmith | Rockin' the Joint Tour | Lenny Kravitz | 13,199 / 13,199 | $1,726,263 |
| July 6 | United States | Pearl Jam | 2006 World Tour | —N/a | | |
| May 27 | United States | Madonna | Confessions Tour | —N/a | 27,528 / 27,528 | $7,257,750 |
| May 28 | United States | Madonna | Confessions Tour | —N/a | 27,528 / 27,528 | $7,257,750 |
| August 12 | Colombia | Shakira | Oral Fixation Tour | Wyclef Jean | | |
| November 22 | United Kingdom | The Rolling Stones | A Bigger Bang Tour | Bonnie Raitt | —N/a | |
| December 26 | Hong Kong | Kelly Chen | Kelly Chen Lost In Paradise World Tour | | | |
| January 18 | United States | Miley Cyrus | Best of Both Worlds Tour | Aly & A.J. | —N/a | |
| January 19 | United States | Miley Cyrus | Best of Both Worlds Tour | Aly & A.J. | —N/a | |
| January 20 | United States | Miley Cyrus | Best of Both Worlds Tour | Aly & A.J. | —N/a | |
| May 9 | United States | Alicia Keys | As I Am Tour | Jordin Sparks; Ne-Yo | —N/a | |
2007
| January 19 | United States | Justin Timberlake | FutureSex/LoveShow | | | |
| August 25 | United States | Beyoncé | The Beyoncé Experience | | 10,171 / 10,171 | $1,251,970 |
2008
| June 21 | United Kingdom | George Michael | 25 Live | | | |
| April 25 | United States | Britney Spears | The Circus Starring Britney Spears | The Pussycat Dolls | 15,728 / 15,728 | $2,482,352 |
| July 25 | United States | Aerosmith; ZZ Top | Aerosmith/ZZ Top Tour | —N/a | | |
2010
| April 24 | United States | Eagles | Long Road Out of Eden Tour | —N/a | 12,970 / 12,970 | $1,631,745 |
| June 18 | United Kingdom | Sting | Symphonicity Tour | —N/a | | |
| July 31 | United States | Aerosmith | Cocked, Locked, Ready to Rock Tour | Sammy Hagar | —N/a | |
| August 13 | United States | Lady Gaga | The Monster Ball Tour | Semi Precious Weapons | —N/a | |
| August 28 | Canada | Michael Bublé | Crazy Love Tour | Naturally 7 | 13,300 / 13,300 | $1,052,585 |
2011
| March 25 | United States | Lady Gaga | The Monster Ball Tour | Scissor Sisters | 14,119 / 14,119 | $1,712,826 |
| June 25 | United States | Britney Spears | Femme Fatale Tour | Nicki Minaj; Jessie and the Toy Boys; NERVO; DJ Pauly D Destinee & Paris | —N/a | |
| September 23 | United States | Bruno Mars | The Doo-Wops & Hooligans Tour | Mayer Hawthorne; Donnis | —N/a | |
| November 5 | United States | Eagles | Long Road Out of Eden Tour | —N/a | | |
| November 19 | United States | Eagles | Long Road Out of Eden Tour | —N/a | | |
2012
| March 10 | United States | 311 | 311 Day | —N/a | | |
| March 11 | United States | 311 | 311 Day | —N/a | | |
| October 13 | United States | Madonna | MDNA Tour | Martin Solveig | 24,991 / 24,991 | $7,188,879 |
| October 14 | United States | Madonna | MDNA Tour | Martin Solveig | 24,991 / 24,991 | $7,188,879 |
| September 30 | Canada | Justin Bieber | Believe Tour | Cody Simpson; Carly Rae Jepsen | 13,504 / 13,504 | $1,076,868 |
| December 1 | United States | Aerosmith | Global Warming Tour | —N/a | | |
2013
| January 25 | United States | Lady Gaga | Born This Way Ball | Madeon; Lady Starlight | —N/a | |
| January 26 | United States | Lady Gaga | Born This Way Ball | Madeon; Lady Starlight | —N/a | |
| May 11 | United Kingdom | The Rolling Stones | 50 & Counting | —N/a | 13,327 / 13,327 (100%) | $6,119,172 |
| June 29 | United States | Beyoncé | The Mrs. Carter Show World Tour | Luke James | 12,913 / 12,913 | $1,856,203 |
| August 3 | United States | Bruno Mars | Moonshine Jungle Tour | Fitz and the Tantrums | 13,850 / 13,850 | $1,559,042 |
| November 23 | Canada | Michael Bublé | To Be Loved Tour | Naturally 7 | 12,474 / 12,474 | $1,148,568 |
| December 6 | United States | Beyoncé | The Mrs. Carter Show World Tour | Luke James | 12,811 / 12,811 | $1,872,823 |
2014
| February 15 | United States | Eagles | History of the Eagles – Live in Concert | —N/a | | |
| March 1 | United States | Miley Cyrus | Bangerz Tour | Icona Pop; Sky Ferreira | —N/a | |
| July 19 | United States | Lady Gaga | Artrave: The Artpop Ball | Lady Starlight | 24,948 / 24,948 | $2,379,981 |
| August 1 | United States | Lady Gaga | Artrave: The Artpop Ball | Lady Starlight | 24,948 / 24,948 | $2,379,981 |
| August 2 | United States | Aerosmith | Let Rock Rule Tour | —N/a | | |
| September 26 | United States | Katy Perry | Prismatic World Tour | Tegan and Sara; Ferras | 12,886 / 12,886 | $1,742,965 |
2015
| May 30 | Ireland | The Script | No Sound Without Silence Tour | Colton Avery; Mary Lambert | —N/a | |
| August 1 | United States | Aerosmith | Blue Army Tour | —N/a | | |
| October 24 | United States | Madonna | Rebel Heart Tour | Lunice | 12,787 / 12,787 | $3,524,113 |
2016
| February 5 | Australia | AC/DC | Rock or Bust World Tour | Tyler Bryant & The Shakedown | 13,817 / 13,817 | $1,416,474 |
| March 25 | Canada | Justin Bieber | Purpose World Tour | Post Malone; Moxie Raia | 13,483 / 13,483 | $1,411,304 |
| August 13 | United States | Demi Lovato & Nick Jonas | Future Now Tour | Mike Posner | 6,823 / 7,112 | $404,492 |
| September 17 | United Kingdom | Black Sabbath | The End Tour | Rival Sons | 11,835 / 11,835 | $1,025,145 |
2017
| February 4 | United States | Ariana Grande | Dangerous Woman Tour | Little Mix; Victoria Monét | 9,437 / 10,787 | $845,275 |
| March 27 | —N/a | Game of Thrones | Live Concert Experience | | 4,783 / 7,321 | $328,286 |
| April 1 | United States | Jimmy Buffett | I Don't Know Tour | —N/a | | |
| April 7 | United States | Green Day | Revolution Radio Tour | Against Me! | 11,659 / 11,907 | $686,810 |
| May 12 | United States | Train | Play That Song Tour | Natasha Bedingfield; O.A.R. | —N/a | |
| May 27 | United States | Dead & Company | Dead & Company Summer Tour 2017 | —N/a | 10,258 / 11,685 | $1,052,921 |
| July 8 | United States | J. Cole | 4 Your Eyez Only World Tour | —N/a | | |
2018
| February 3 | United States | The Killers | Wonderful Wonderful World Tour | Amanda Brown; Albert Hammond Jr. | —N/a | |
| February 17 | Hong Kong | Jacky Cheung | A Classic Tour | | | |
| February 18 | Hong Kong | Jacky Cheung | A Classic Tour | | | |
| March 3 | United States | Demi Lovato | Tell Me You Love Me World Tour | DJ Khaled; Kehlani | 11,133 / 11,675 | $720,336 |
| August 25 | United States | Rob Zombie & Marilyn Manson | Twins of Evil: The Second Coming Tour | Deadly Apples | | |
| September 1 | Colombia | Shakira | El Dorado World Tour | Salva | | |
2019
| July 13 | Australia | Hugh Jackman | The Man. The Music. The Show. tour | | | |
| September 13 | United Kingdom | Iron Maiden | Legacy of the Beast World Tour | | | |
| November 27 | Taiwan | Jonathan Lee | Those Songs Through the Years World Tour | | | |
| November 28 | Taiwan | Jonathan Lee | Those Songs Through the Years World Tour | | | |
| December 15 | United States | Ariana Grande | Sweetener World Tour | —N/a | | |
2020
| February 8 | Hong Kong | Aaron Kwok | Aaron Kwok de Aa Kode World Tour | | | |
2021
| September 4 | United Kingdom | Harry Styles | Love On Tour | Jenny Lewis | 13,413 / 13,413 | $1,686,284 |
| November 25 | Malaysia | Fish Leong | Thanksgiving Show 2021 | | | |
2022
| February 6 | Taiwan | Jonathan Lee | Those Songs Through the Years World Tour (Encore) | | | |
2023
| January 28 | Singapore | JJ Lin | JJ20 World Tour | | 16,199 / 16,199 | $4,929,982 |
| January 29 | Singapore | JJ Lin | JJ20 World Tour | | 16,199 / 16,199 | $4,929,982 |
| September 8 | United States | Jonas Brothers | Five Albums. One Night. The World Tour | | | |
| September 14 | Mexico | RBD | Soy Rebelde Tour | —N/a | 12,303 / 12,303 | $3,424,124 |
| October 27 | United States | Jonas Brothers | Five Albums. One Night. The World Tour | | | |
| October 29 | United States | Travis Scott | Circus Maximus Tour | Teezo Touchdown | | |
2024
| February 24 | China | Joker Xue | Extraterrestrial World Tour | | 8,470/10,868 | $2,451,185 |
| June 22 | United States | Megan Thee Stallion | Hot Girl Summer Tour | GloRilla | | |
| September 6 | United States | Suicideboys | Grey Day 2024 Tour | | 11,252/11,252 | $1,182,115 |
2025
| November 29 | United States | Jonas Brothers | Jonas20: Greetings from Your Hometown Tour | Jesse McCartney; Frankie Jonas; Deleasa | — | — |
| December 12 | United States | Zach Top | Cold Beer & Country Music Tour | Jake Worthington | — | — |

== Gallery ==
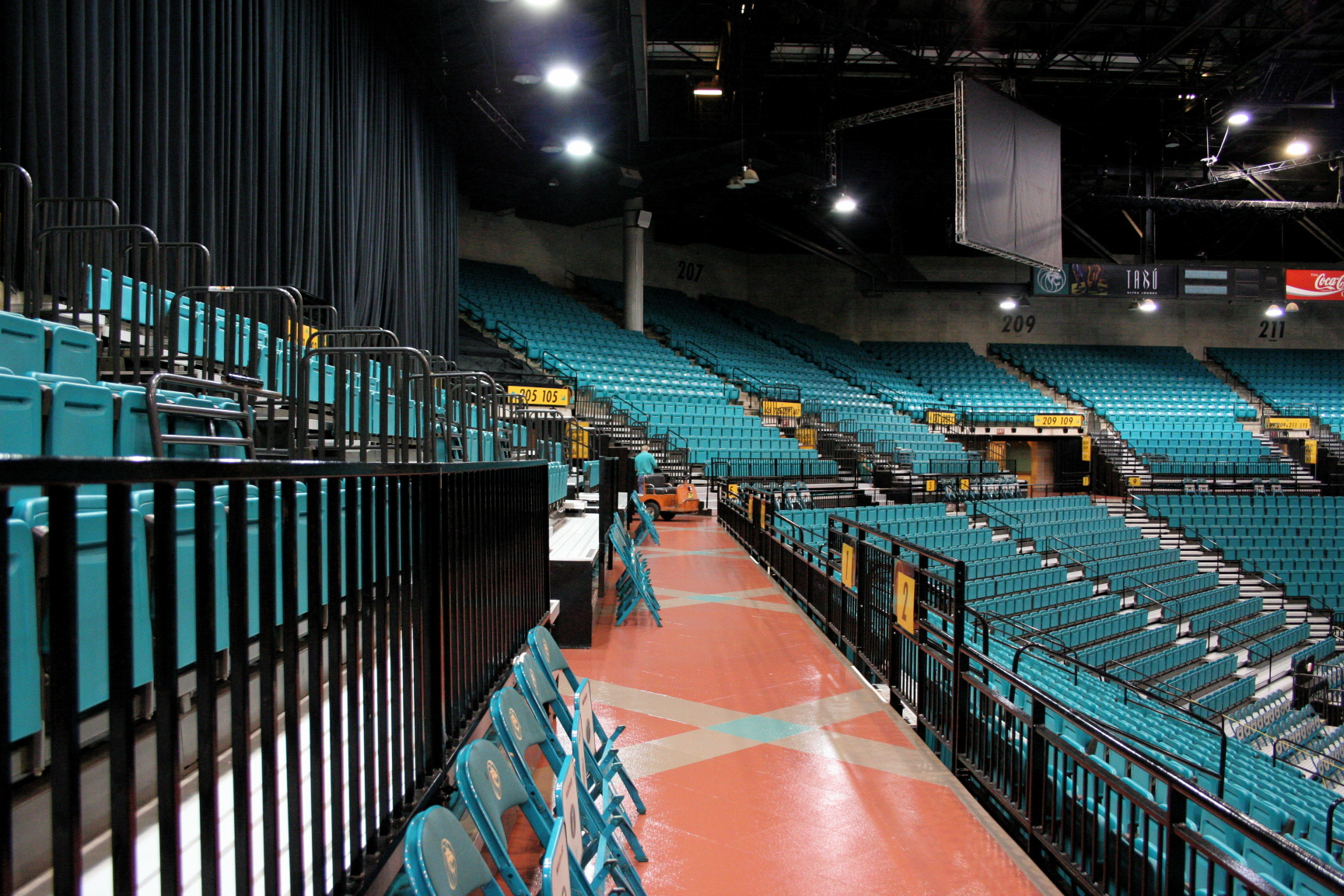
MGM Grand Garden Arena interior

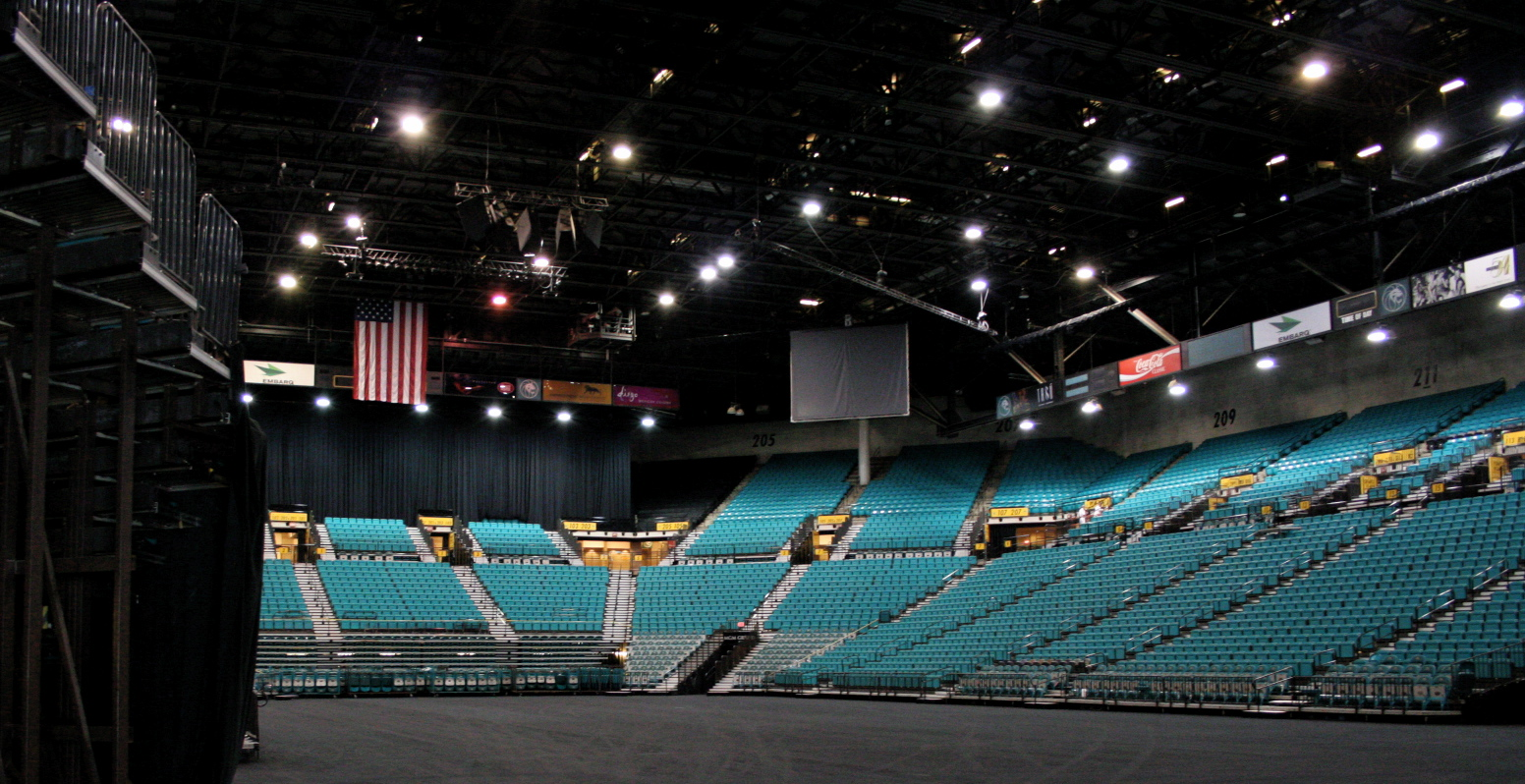
MGM Grand Garden Arena interior

Events and tenants
| Preceded by Mandalay Bay Events Center; Mohegan Sun Arena | Ultimate Fighting Championship venue UFC 34; UFC 36 | Succeeded by Mohegan Sun Arena; CenturyTel Center |
