= List of Latin Grammy Award ceremony locations =

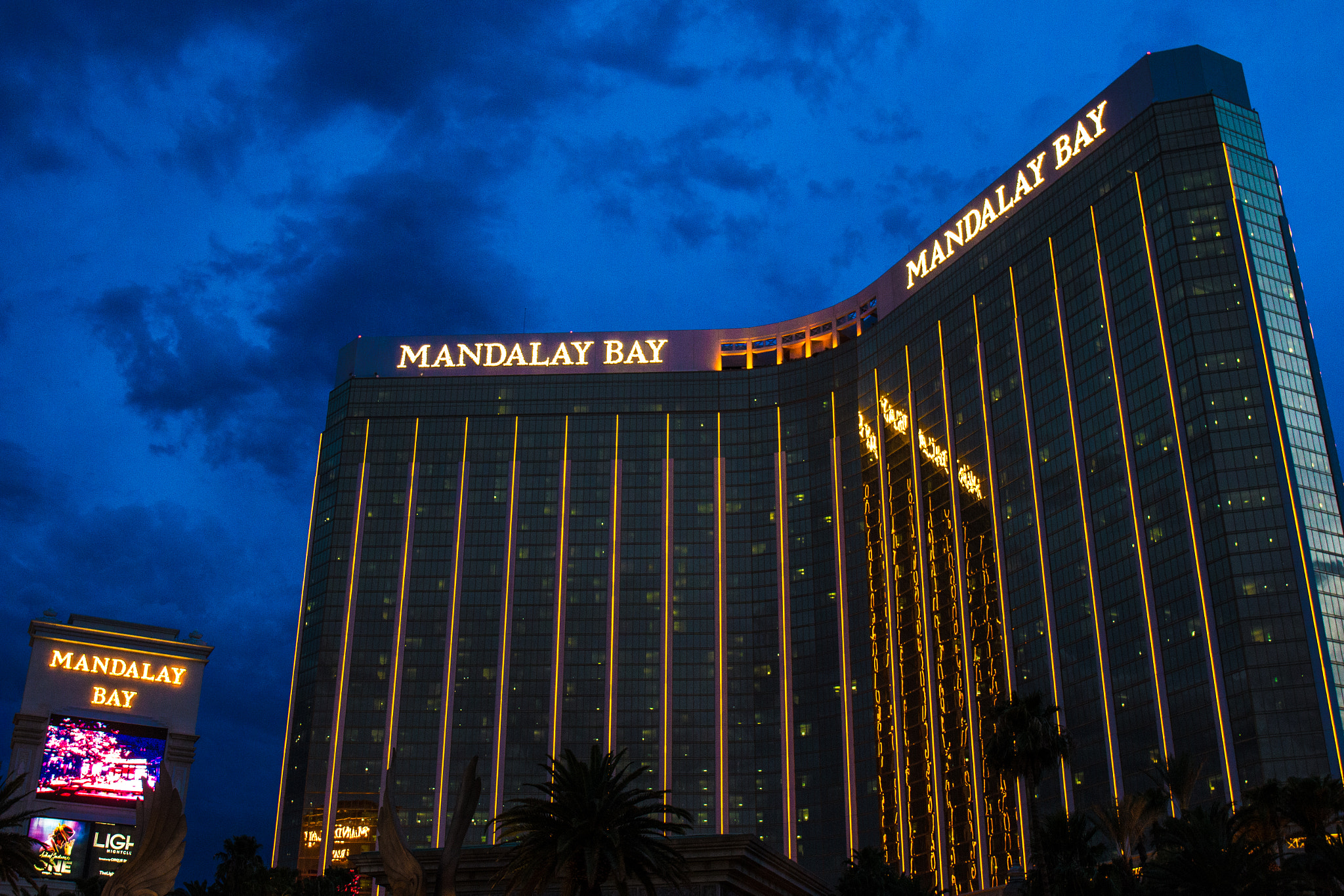
On seven occasions, the Latin Grammy Awards have been held at the Michelob Ultra Arena in Las Vegas, which is part of the Mandalay Bay Resort & Casino

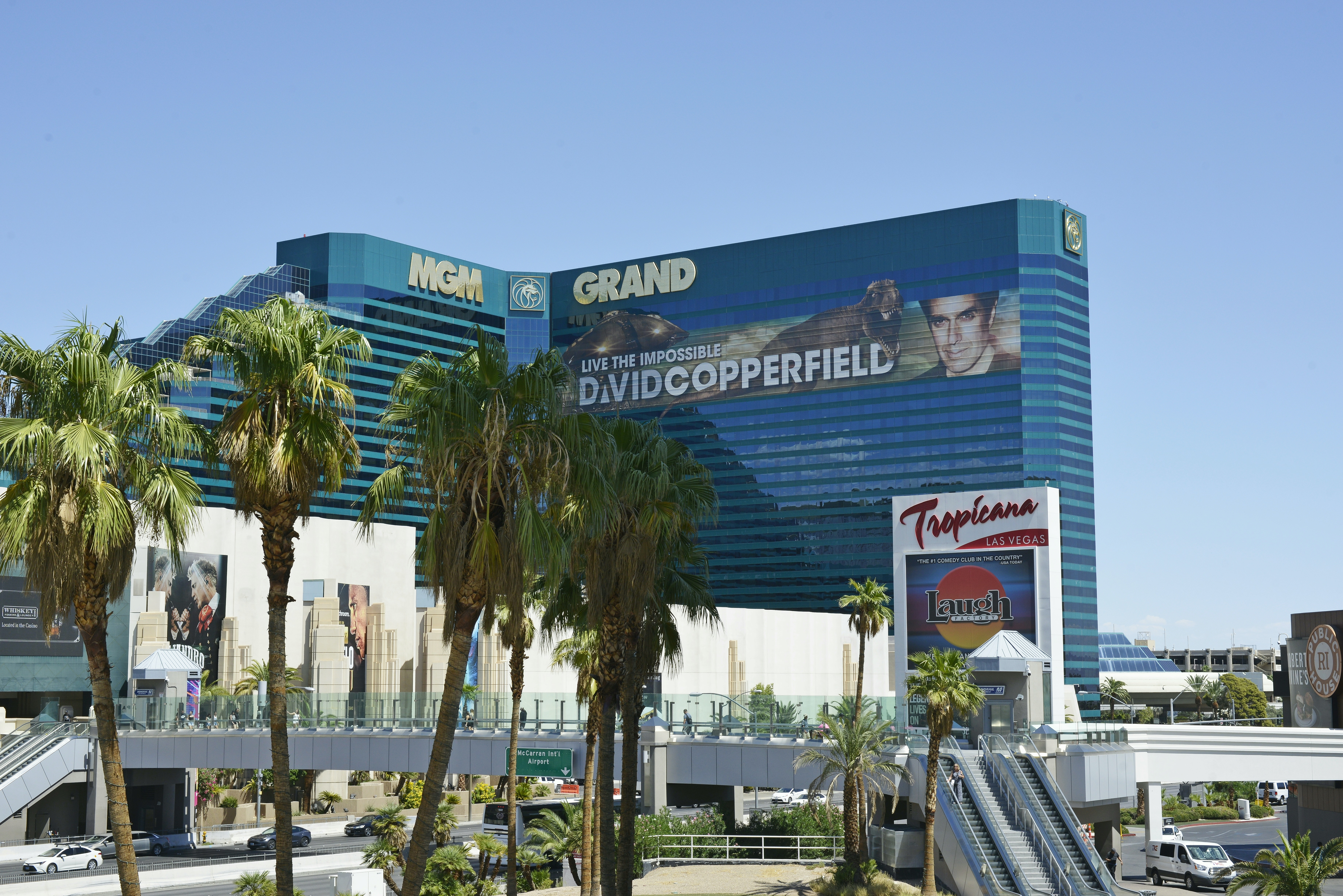
The MGM Grand Garden Arena at the MGM Grand Las Vegas hosted its seventh Latin Grammy telecast in 2025

Since 2007, the Latin Grammy Awards have been held most often in Las Vegas. The Latin Grammy Awards have also been held in four other US cities and were held outside of the United States for the first time in 2023 when the 24th Annual Latin Grammy Awards were held in Spain.

== Host cities and venues ==
The table below lists the host city, venue, date and hosts for each telecast.

Year	Date	Venue	Host city	Host(s)	Person of the Year	Viewers (in millions)
2000	September 13, 2000	Crypto.com Arena	Los Angeles, CA	Gloria Estefan, Jennifer Lopez, Andy García, Jimmy Smits, Antonio Banderas	Emilio Estefan	7.5
2001	October 30, 2001 (Note: Ceremony was originally set to take place on September 11 at the Shrine Auditorium in Los Angeles but were canceled due to the terrorist attacks earlier that day; winners were announced at a later press conference at the Conga Room the following month.)	Conga Room	Los Angeles, CA	Jimmy Smits, Paul Rodriguez	Julio Iglesias	N/A
2002	September 18, 2002	Dolby Theatre	Los Angeles, CA	Gloria Estefan, Jimmy Smits	Vicente Fernández	4.0
2003	September 3, 2003	Kaseya Center	Miami, FL	George Lopez	Gilberto Gil	5.0
2004	September 1, 2004	Shrine Auditorium	Los Angeles, CA	George Lopez	Carlos Santana	3.3
2005	November 3, 2005	Shrine Auditorium	Los Angeles, CA	Rebecca de Alba, Eduardo Santamarina	José José	5.0
2006	November 2, 2006	Madison Square Garden	New York City, NY	Lucero, Víctor Manuelle	Ricky Martin	5.7
2007	November 8, 2007	Michelob Ultra Arena	Las Vegas, NV	Lucero, Eugenio Derbez	Juan Luis Guerra	6.2
2008	November 13, 2008	Toyota Center (Note: Awards in the Brazilian Field were presented at Auditório Ibirapuera in São Paulo, Brazil.)	Houston, TX	Patricia Manterola, Cristián de la Fuente	Gloria Estefan	5.8
2009	November 5, 2009	Michelob Ultra Arena	Las Vegas, NV	Lucero, Eugenio Derbez	Juan Gabriel	6.0
2010	November 11, 2010	Michelob Ultra Arena	Las Vegas, NV	Lucero, Eugenio Derbez	Plácido Domingo	6.2
2011	November 10, 2011	Michelob Ultra Arena	Las Vegas, NV	Lucero, Cristián de la Fuente	Shakira	5.7
2012	November 15, 2012	Michelob Ultra Arena	Las Vegas, NV	Lucero, Cristián de la Fuente	Caetano Veloso	5.7
2013	November 21, 2013	Michelob Ultra Arena	Las Vegas, NV	Omar Rafael "Chaparro" Alvidrez, Lucero, Blanca Soto	Miguel Bosé	4.6
2014	November 20, 2014	MGM Grand Garden Arena	Las Vegas, NV	Eugenio Derbez	Joan Manuel Serrat	4.8
2015	November 19, 2015	MGM Grand Garden Arena	Las Vegas, NV	Jacqueline Bracamontes, Roselyn Sánchez	Roberto Carlos	4.0
2016	November 17, 2016	T-Mobile Arena	Las Vegas, NV	None	Marc Anthony	3.1
2017	November 16, 2017	MGM Grand Garden Arena	Las Vegas, NV	Roselyn Sánchez and Jaime Camil	Alejandro Sanz	2.7
2018	November 15, 2018	MGM Grand Garden Arena	Las Vegas, NV	Ana de la Reguera and Carlos Rivera	Maná	2.7
2019	November 14, 2019	MGM Grand Garden Arena	Las Vegas, NV	Ricky Martin, Roselyn Sánchez and Paz Vega	Juanes	3,4
2020	November 19, 2020	Kaseya Center	Miami, FL	Yalitza Aparicio, Ana Brenda Contreras and Victor Manuelle	No award due to the COVID-19 pandemic	5.7
2021	November 18, 2021	MGM Grand Garden Arena	Las Vegas, NV	Carlos Rivera, Ana Brenda Contreras and Roselyn Sánchez	Rubén Blades	5.9
2022	November 17, 2022	Michelob Ultra Arena	Las Vegas, NV	Anitta, Luis Fonsi, Laura Pausini and Thalía	Marco Antonio Solís	5.3
2023	November 16, 2023	FIBES Conference and Exhibition Centre	Seville, Spain	Sebastián Yatra, Danna Paola, Roselyn Sánchez, Paz Vega	Laura Pausini	
2024	November 14, 2024	Kaseya Center	Miami, FL	Roselyn Sánchez	Carlos Vives	
2025	November 13, 2025	MGM Grand Garden Arena	Las Vegas, NV	Maluma and Roselyn Sánchez	Raphael	

=== Most Frequent Venues ===
The Michelob Ultra Arena and the MGM Grand Garden Arena have hosted seven telecasts each.

Rank	1st	2nd	3rd
Venue	Michelob Ultra Arena; MGM Grand Garden Arena	Kaseya Center	Shrine Auditorium
Number of telecasts	7	3	2

==== Gallery ====
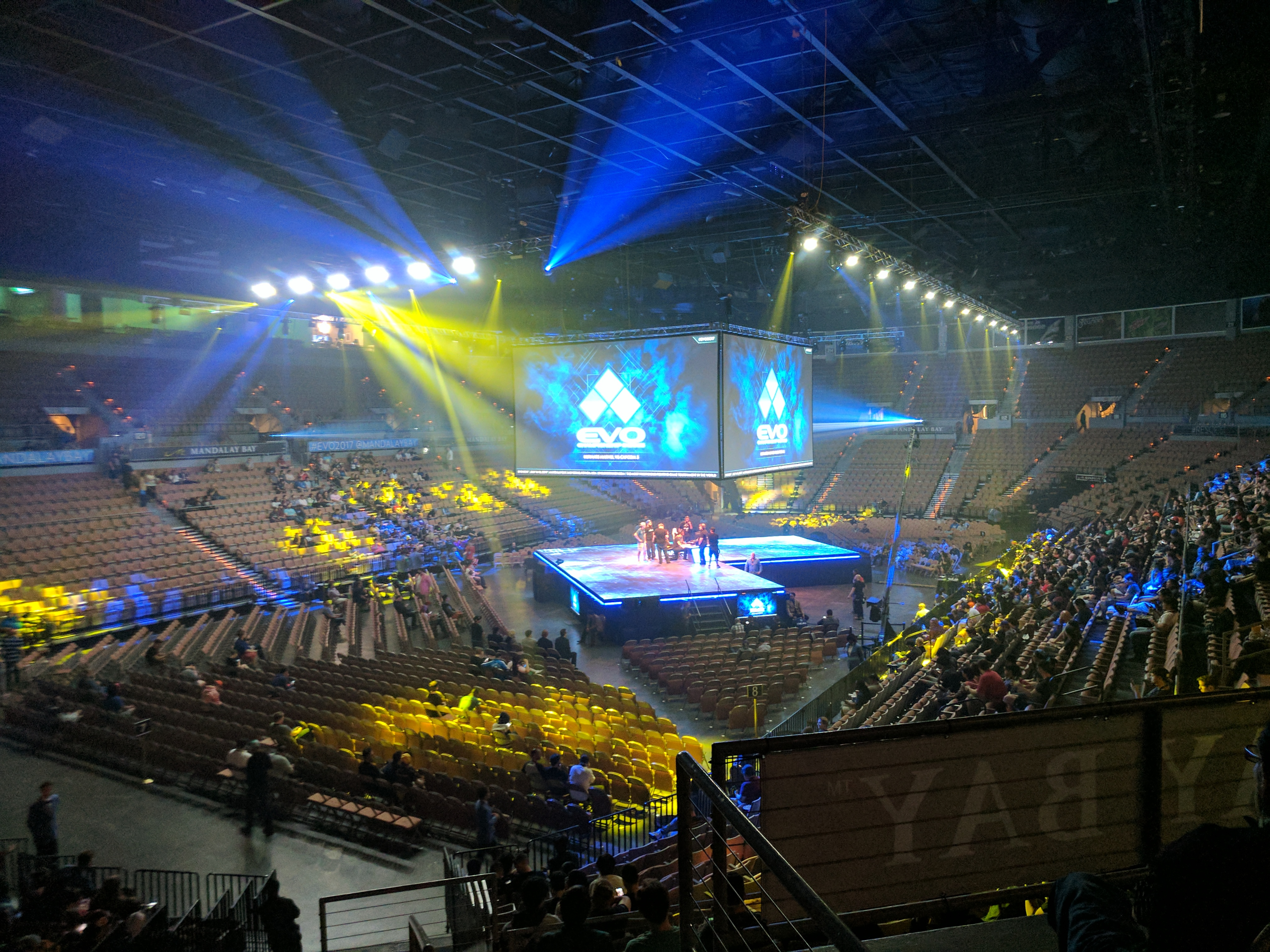
The Michelob Ultra Arena at Mandalay Bay has hosted seven telecasts

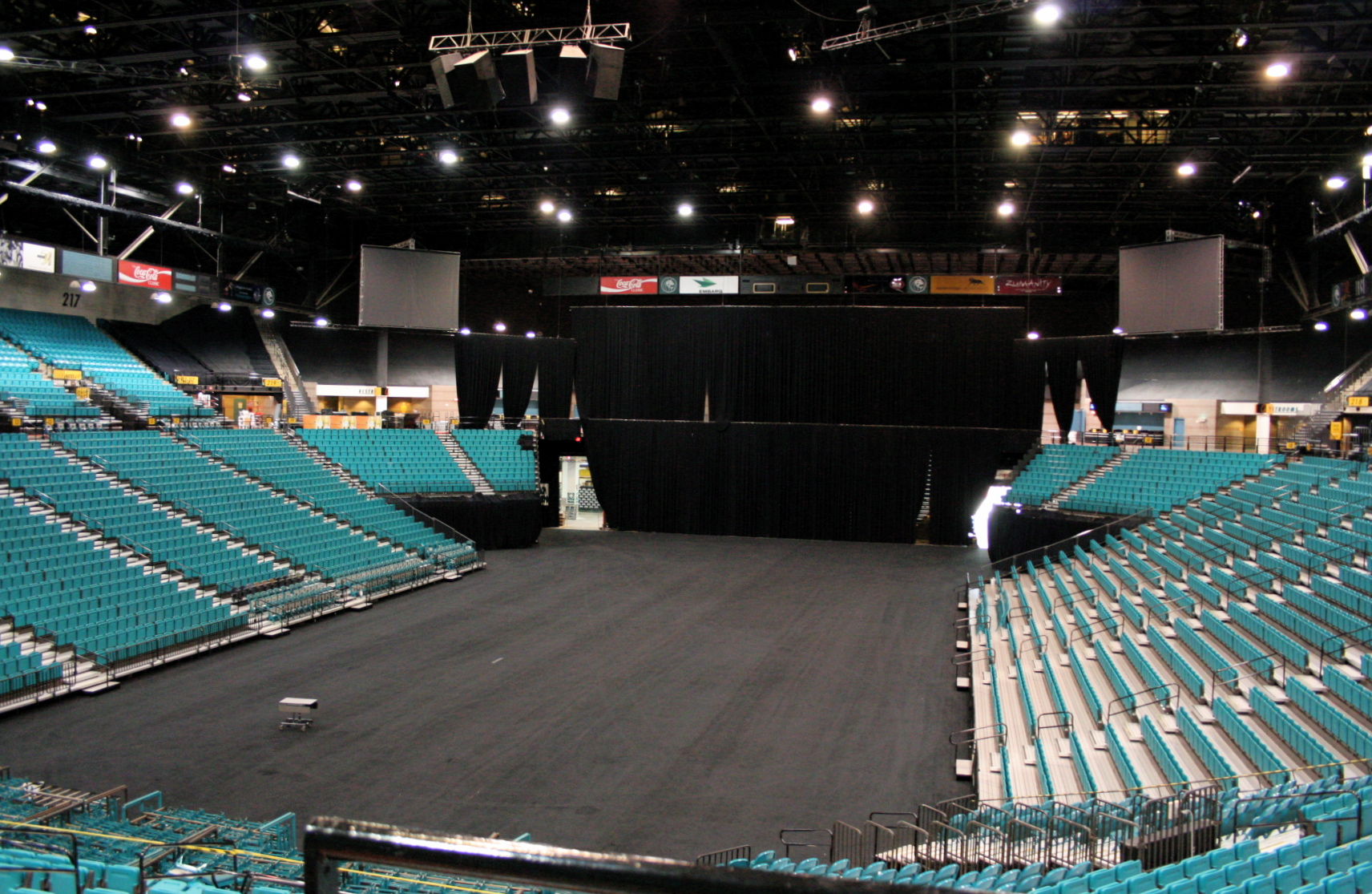
The MGM Grand Garden Arena at MGM Grand Las Vegas has hosted seven telecasts

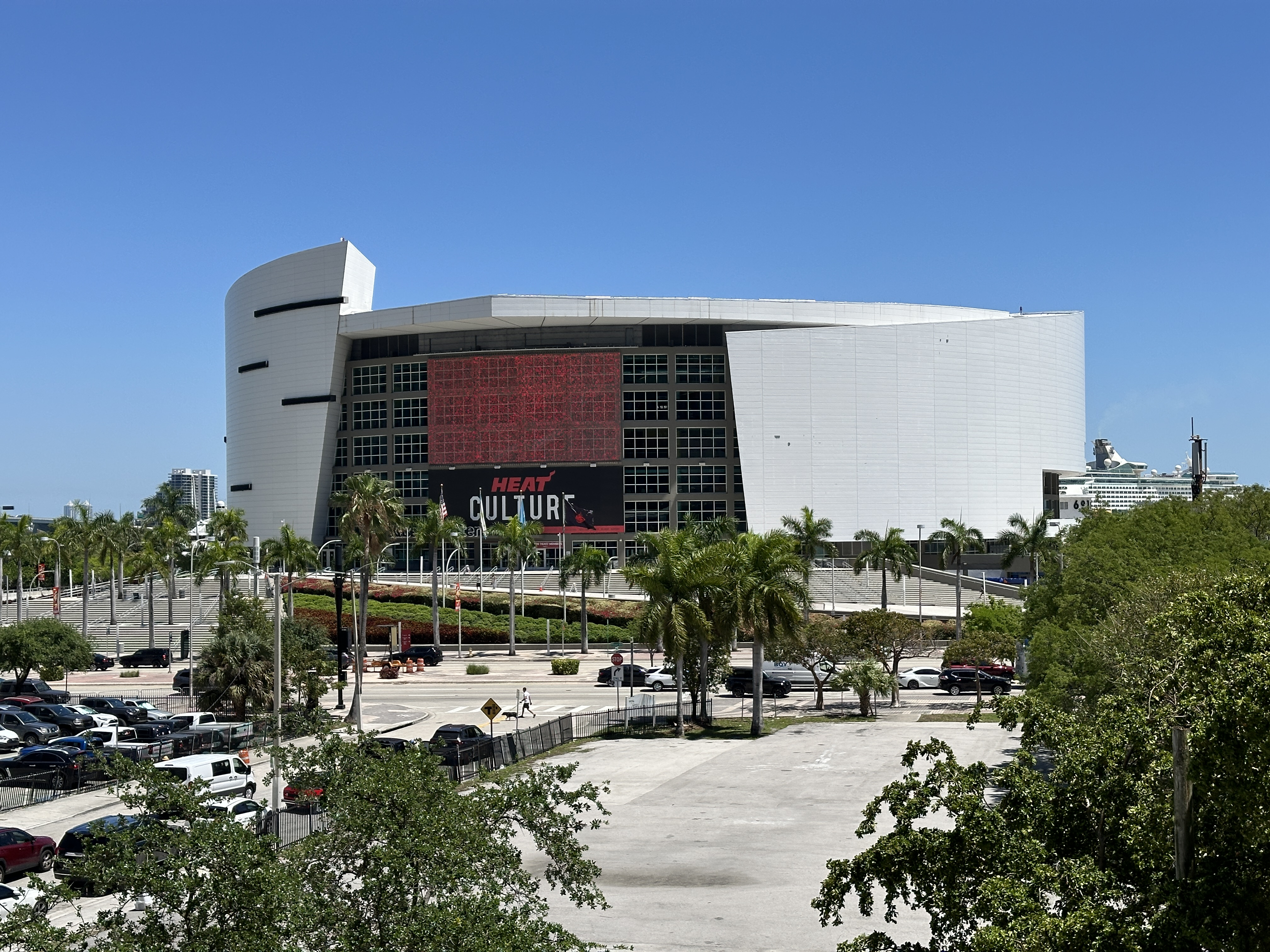
The Kaseya Center has hosted three telecasts

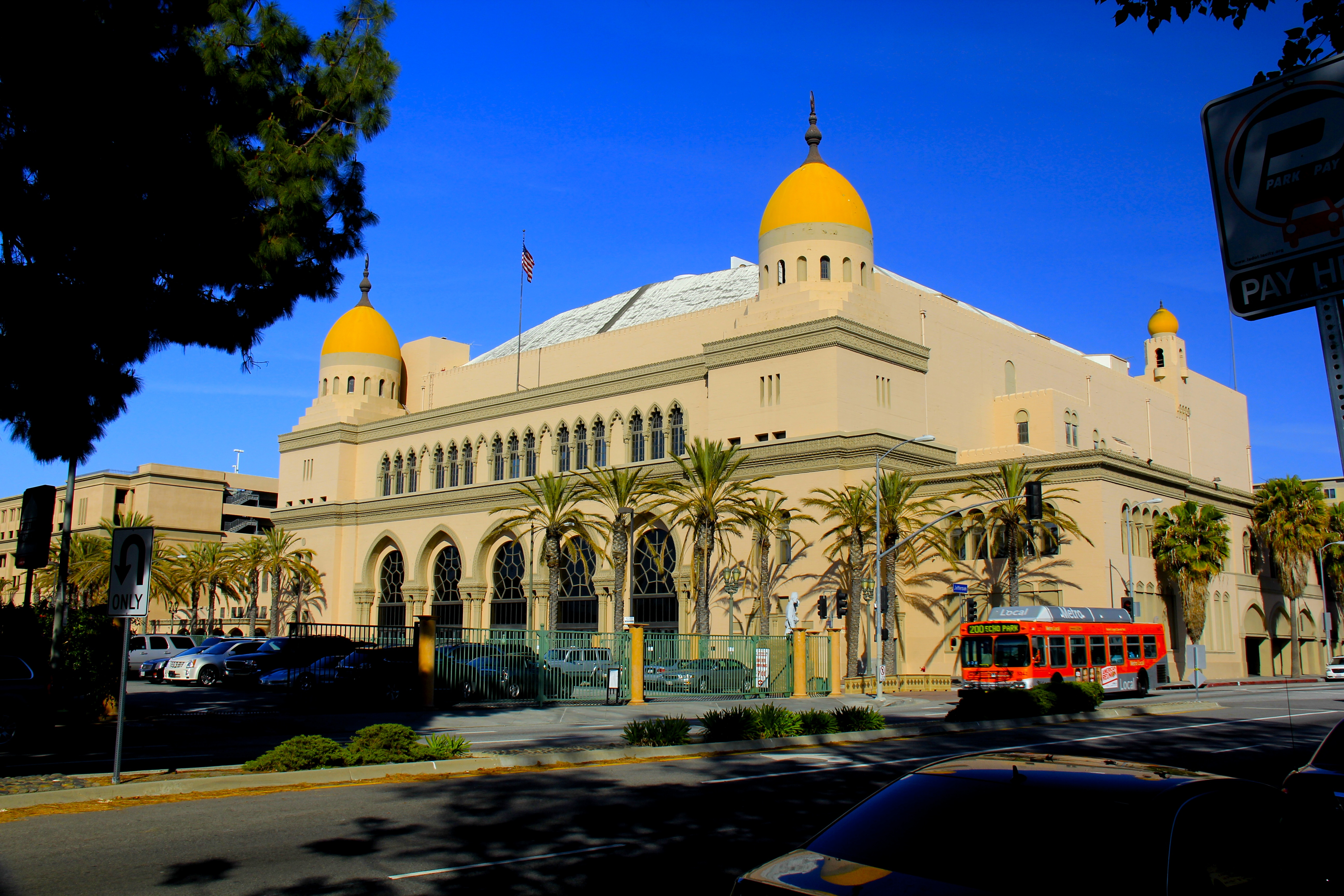
The Shrine Auditorium has hosted two telecasts

=== Most frequent host cities ===
Las Vegas has hosted the Latin Grammy Awards fifteen times amongst three different venues in the unincorporated town of Paradise. Las Vegas will host the telecast for a fifteenth time in 2025. Los Angeles has served as host five times, hosting during the infancy of the Latin Grammy Awards. In 2023, the Latin Grammy Awards were held in Seville, Spain, marking the first time the awards were held outside of the US.

Rank	1st	2nd	3rd	4th
Venue	Las Vegas	Los Angeles	Miami	Houston, New York, Seville
Number of telecasts	15	5	3	1

==== Gallery ====
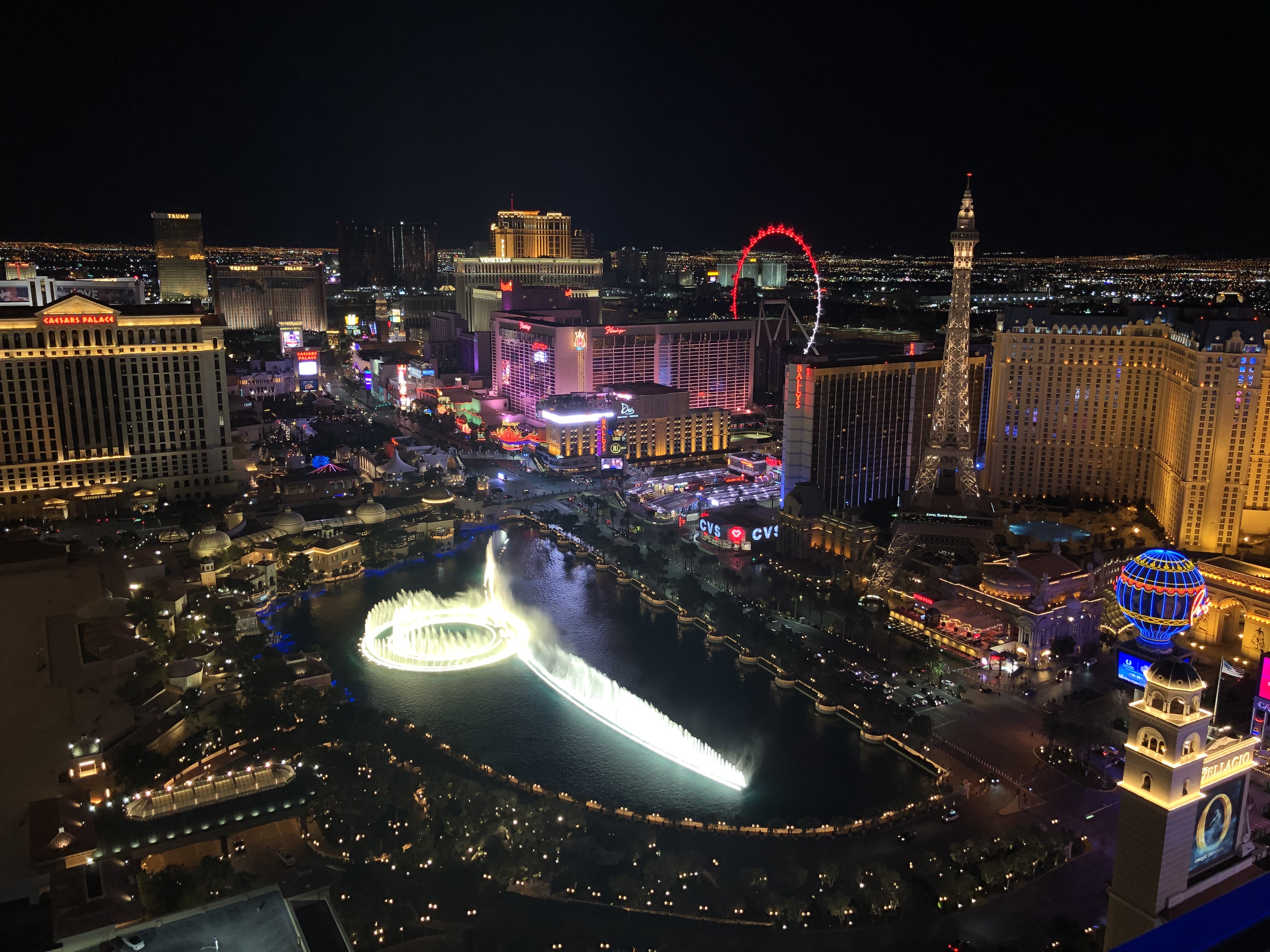
Las Vegas has hosted fifteen telecasts

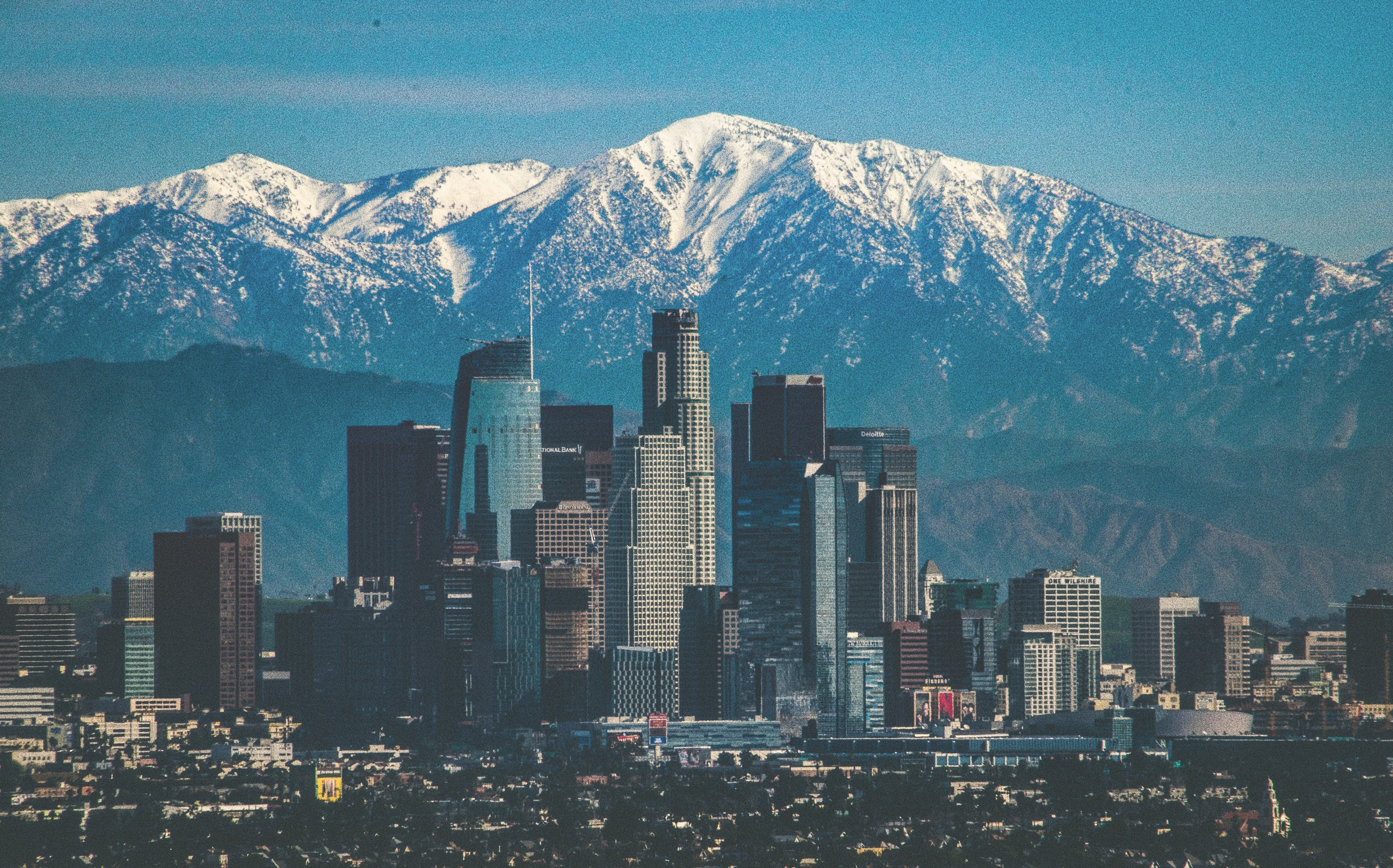
Los Angeles has hosted five telecasts

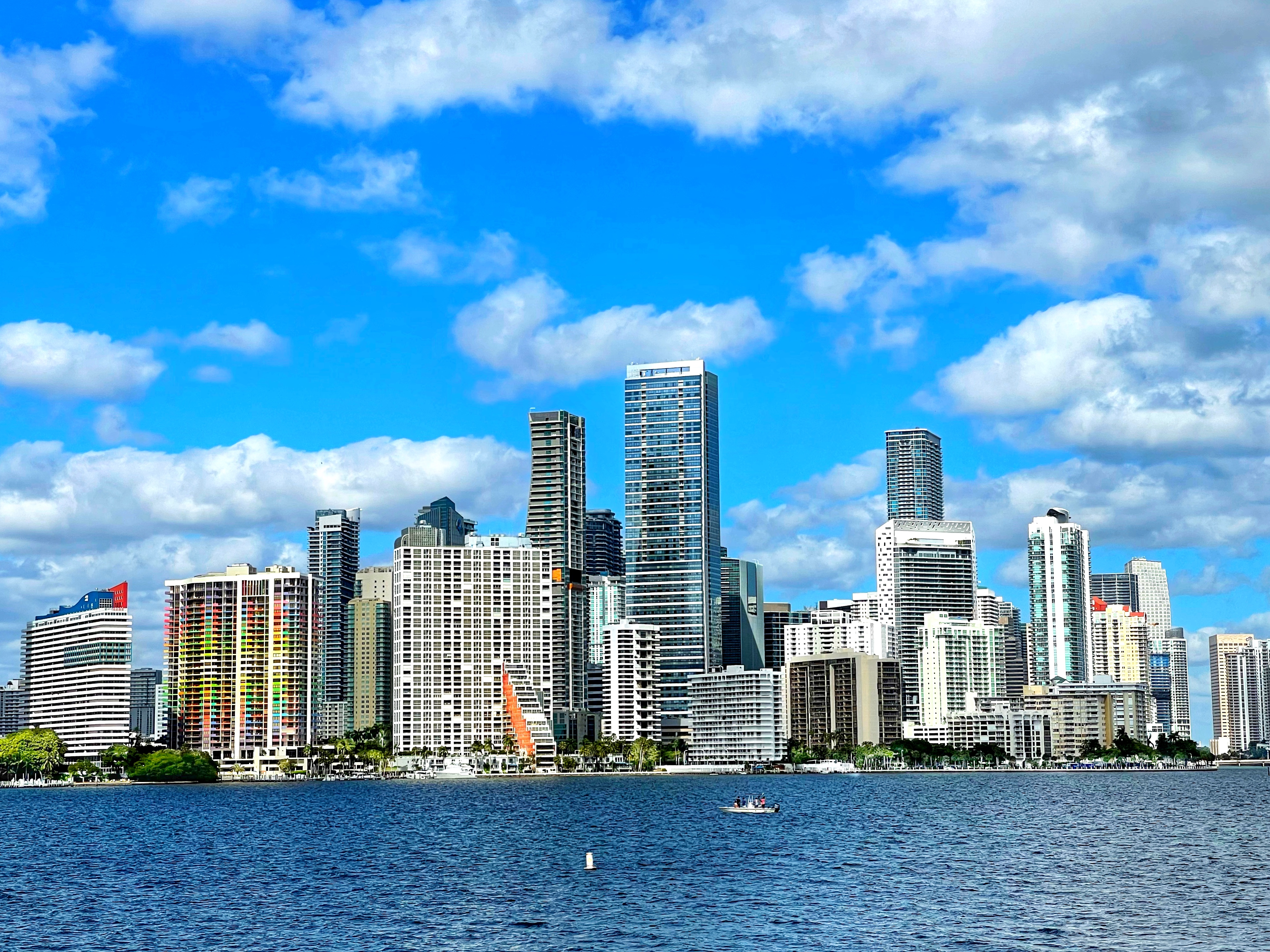
Miami has hosted three telecasts

Houston hosted in 2008

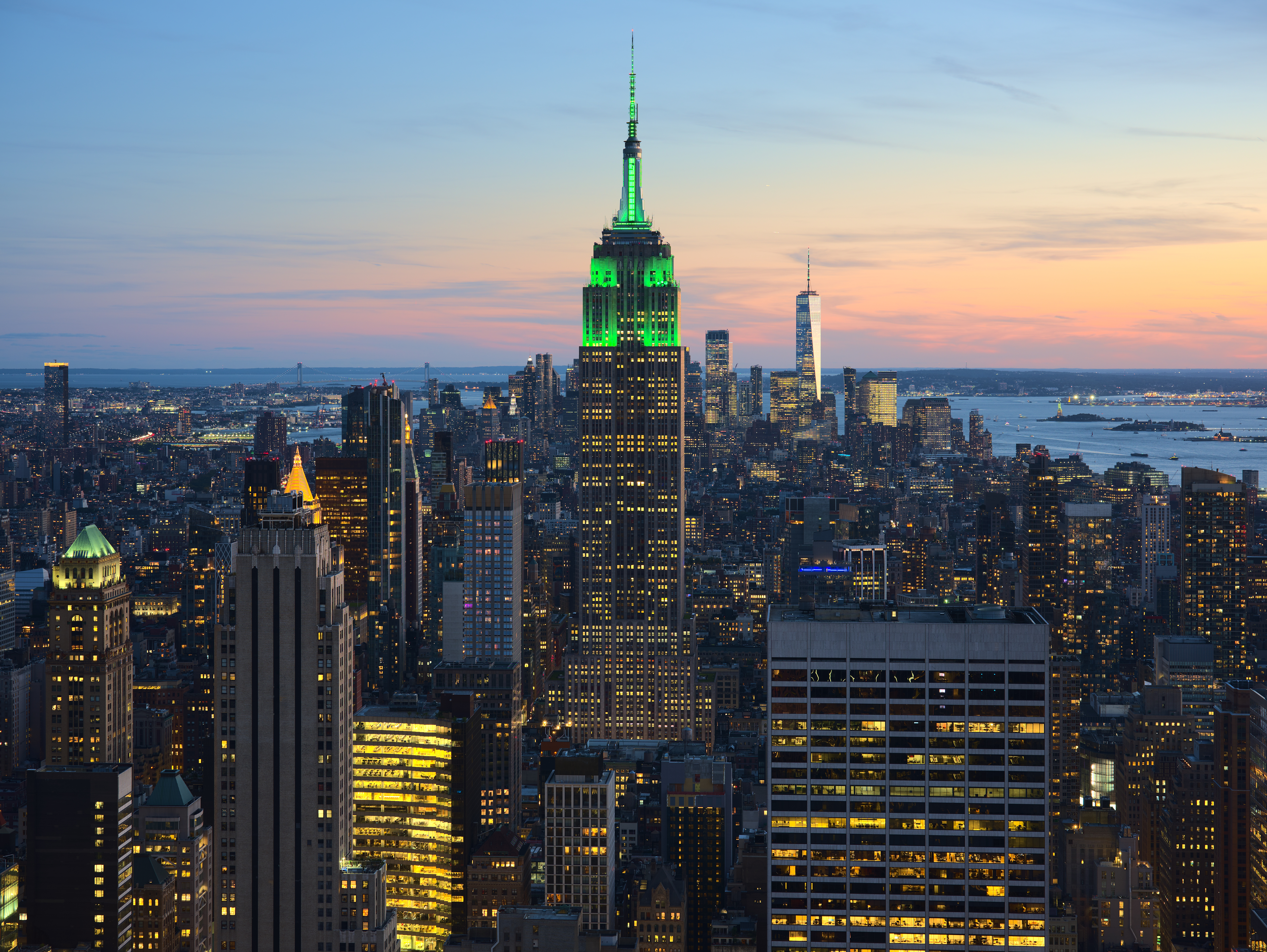
New York City hosted in 2006

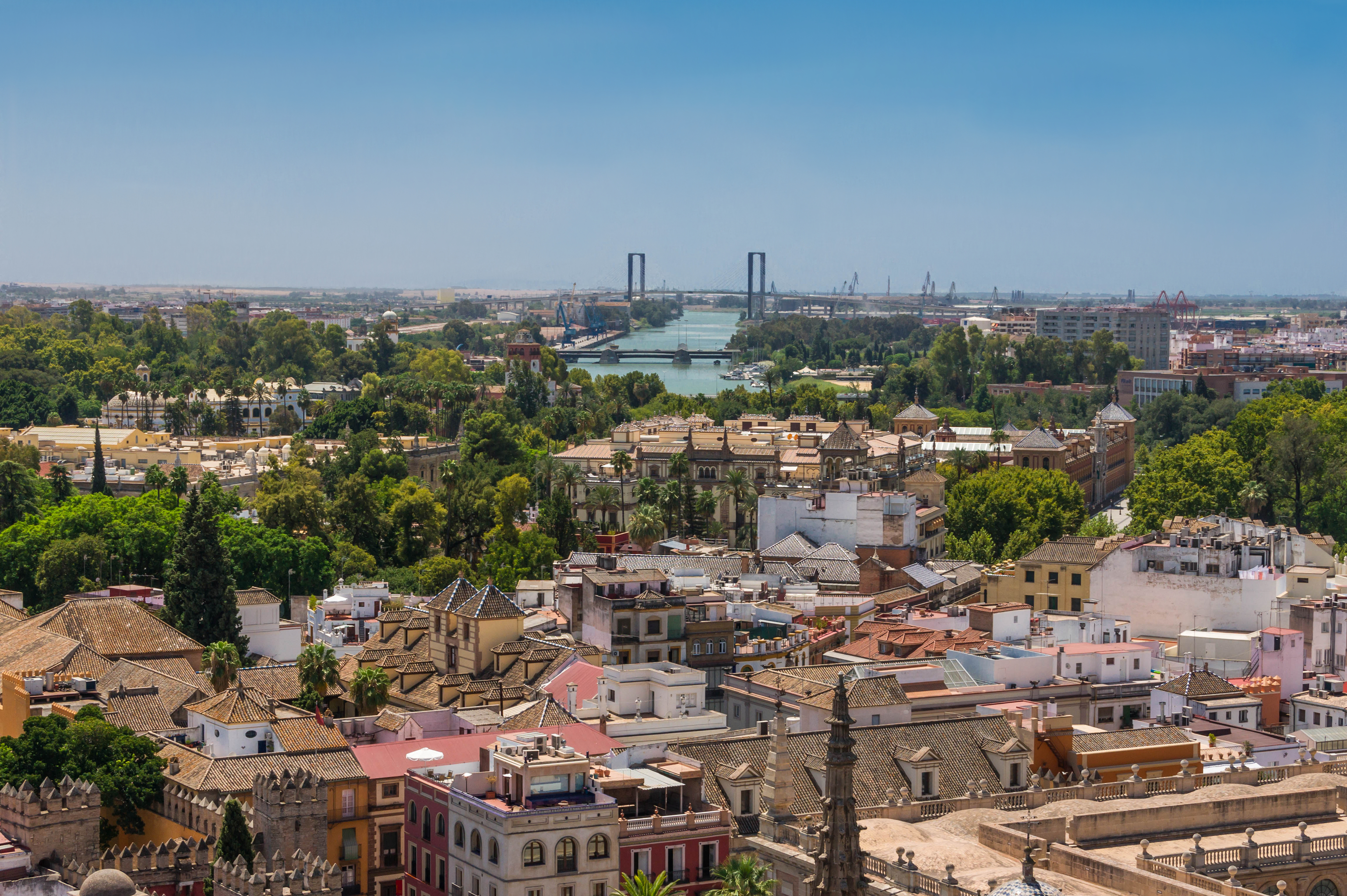
Seville hosted in 2023

== See also ==
- List of Grammy Award ceremony locations
