= 1993 Buffalo Bills season =

34th season in franchise history, fourth straight Super Bowl appearance and loss

- Owner: Ralph Wilson
- General manager: John Butler
- Head coach: Marv Levy
- Offensive coordinator: Tom Bresnahan
- Defensive coordinator: Walt Corey
- Home stadium: Rich Stadium

Results
- Record: 12–4
- Division place: 1st AFC East
- Playoffs: Won Divisional Playoffs (vs. Raiders) 29–23; Won AFC Championship (vs. Chiefs) 30–13; Lost Super Bowl XXVIII (vs. Cowboys) 13–30
- All-Pros: 3: DT Bruce Smith (1st team); RB Thurman Thomas (2nd team); CB Nate Odomes (2nd team)
- Pro Bowlers: 7: RB Thurman Thomas; WR Andre Reed; OT Howard Ballard; OLB Cornelius Bennett; DT Bruce Smith; CB Nate Odomes; ST Steve Tasker

The 1993 Buffalo Bills season was the 34th season for the team in the National Football League (NFL). The Buffalo Bills finished the National Football League's 1993 season with a record of 12 wins and 4 losses, and finished first in the AFC East division.

The Bills qualified for their fourth straight Super Bowl, where they faced the Dallas Cowboys in a rematch of the previous season's Super Bowl. However, the Bills once again fell to the Cowboys, this time by a score of 30–13, marking their fourth straight Super Bowl loss.

Until the 2020 season, this Bills squad was the last to reach the AFC Championship Game. The Bills' four consecutive Super Bowl appearances remains unmatched as of 2026, with no other team having even so much as played in four out of five consecutive Super Bowls until the New England Patriots did so from 2014 through 2018 and later the Kansas City Chiefs from 2019 through 2024. This is also the last Super Bowl appearance for the Bills overall as of 2026.

== Season summary ==
Despite the many jokes about the Bills having lost three straight Super Bowls—a fan pleaded with head coach Marv Levy for the team to not return to the Super Bowl: "I can't take it. I can't go to work on Monday if we don't win the game. It's tearing me up. I can't handle it"—Don Beebe recalled that "I've got to be honest with you. We thrived in it. We enjoyed it. We were going to go to four ... I think that comes a lot from the Winston Churchill poems and the speeches that we would get from Marv". Dan Patrick reported that "Buffalo players have been wearing t-shirts reading something along the lines of 'Let's Tick Them Off and Go for Four'". The team qualified for another Super Bowl; they became the first franchise to win four consecutive conference championships, as well as the first to appear in four consecutive Super Bowls.

Defensive end Bruce Smith was named NEA Defensive Player of the Year, and tied for the league lead with 13.5 sacks. Smith, linebacker Darryl Talley and special teams gunner Steve Tasker were named to the 1993 All-Pro team. The Bills' 47 defensive takeaways in 1993 is the third-highest total of the 1990s.

Running back Thurman Thomas led the AFC with 1,315 rushing yards.

== Offseason ==
Additions	Subtractions
WR Bill Brooks (Colts)	LB Shane Conlan (Rams)
CB Mickey Washington (Redskins)	WR James Lofton (Rams)
	CB Cliff Hicks (Jets)
	G Mitch Frerotte (Seahawks)

=== NFL draft ===
1993 Buffalo Bills draft
Round	Pick	Player	Position	College	Notes
1	28	Thomas Smith	CB	North Carolina	
2	55	John Parrella	DT	Nebraska	
4	111	Russell Copeland	WR	Memphis	
5	136	Mike Devlin	C	Iowa	
5	139	Sebastian Savage	CB	NC State	
5	167	Corbin Lacina	OT	Augustana	
7	195	Willie Harris	WR	Mississippi State	
8	223	Chris Leuneberg	OT	West Chester (PA)	
Made roster † Pro Football Hall of Fame * Made at least one Pro Bowl during career

=== Undrafted free agents ===
1993 undrafted free agents of note
Player	Position	College
Kurt Bloedorn	Punter	Cal State Fullerton
Monty Brown	Linebacker	Ferris State
Phil Bryant	Running back	Virginia Tech
Jason Carthen	Linebacker	Ohio State
Malcolm Everette	Safety	Youngstown State
Anthony Fieldings	Linebacker	Morningside
Bob Gordon	Wide receiver	Nebraska-Omaha
Dean Jones	Defensive end	Morningside
Yonel Jourdain	Running back	Southern Illinois
Kevin O'Brien	Linebacker	Bowling Green
Tom Svobodny	Tackle	Morehead State
David White	Linebacker	Nebraska

== Personnel ==
1993 Buffalo Bills staff
Front office: Owner/President – Ralph Wilson; Vice President of Administration/general manager – John Butler; Vice President of Football Operations – Marv Levy; Assistant general manager/Director of Pro Personnel – Bob Ferguson; Director of player personnel – John Butler; Assistant director/Collegiate Scouting – A. J. Smith; Director of Player Development/Alumni Relations - Jerry Butler; Head coaches: Head coach – Marv Levy; Assistant head coach – Elijah Pitts; Administrative Assistant to the Head Coach – Chuck Lester; Offensive coaches: Offensive coordinator/Offensive Line – Tom Bresnahan; Quarterbacks – Jim Shofner; Running Backs – Elijah Pitts; Receivers – Charlie Joiner; Offensive Quality Control/Tight Ends – Don Lawrence	Defensive coaches: Defensive coordinatorr/Linebackers – Walt Corey; Defensive line – Dan Sekanovich; Defensive backs – Dick Roach; Defensive Quality Control / Administrative Assistant – Chuck Lester; Special teams coaches: Special teams – Bruce DeHaven; Strength and conditioning: Strength and conditioning Coordinator – Rusty Jones

=== Roster ===
1993 Buffalo Bills roster
Quarterbacks (QB): 7 Gale Gilbert; 12 Jim Kelly; 14 Frank Reich; Running backs (RB): 23 Kenneth Davis KR; 33 Eddie Fuller; 35 Carwell Gardner FB; 34 Thurman Thomas; 21 Nate Turner FB; Wide receivers (WR): 82 Don Beebe KR; 80 Bill Brooks; 85 Russell Copeland; 81 Brad Lamb; 83 Andre Reed; 89 Steve Tasker; 87 Chris Walsh; Tight ends (TE): 84 Keith McKeller; 88 Pete Metzelaars	Offensive linemen (OL): 75 Howard Ballard T; 66 Jerry Crafts T; 65 John Davis G/C; 62 Mike Devlin C; 70 John Fina T; 67 Kent Hull C; 68 Corbin Lacina G; 63 Adam Lingner; 74 Glenn Parker G; 51 Jim Ritcher G; Defensive linemen (DL): 77 Oliver Barnett DE; 90 Phil Hansen DE; 73 Mike Lodish NT; 92 John Parrella NT; 99 James Patton; 94 Mark Pike DE; 78 Bruce Smith DE; 91 Jeff Wright NT	Linebackers (LB): 97 Cornelius Bennett OLB; 96 Monty Brown ILB; 50 Keith Goganious ILB; 52 Richard Harvey OLB; 55 Mark Maddox ILB; 53 Marvcus Patton ILB; 56 Darryl Talley OLB; Defensive backs (DB): 43 Matt Darby FS; 36 Jerome Henderson CB; 20 Henry Jones SS; 38 Mark Kelso FS; 37 Nate Odomes CB; 24 Kurt Schulz FS; 28 Thomas Smith CB; 25 Mickey Washington CB; 29 James Williams CB; Special teams (ST): 2 Steve Christie K; 9 Chris Mohr P	Practice squad: 54 Anthony Fieldings LB; 30 Yonel Jourdain RB; 48 Vince Marrow TE; 60 Jerry Ostroski G; 31 Sebastian Savage CB; Reserve: 86 Rob Awalt TE (IR); 85 Al Edwards WR (IR); 47 Kirby Jackson CB (IR); 53 active, 3 inactive, 5 practice squad Rookies in italics

== Regular season ==
=== Schedule ===
Week	Date	Opponent	Result	Record	Venue	Attendance
1	September 5	**New England Patriots**	**W** 38–14	1–0	Rich Stadium	79,751
2	September 12	at Dallas Cowboys	**W** 13–10	2–0	Texas Stadium	63,226
3	Bye					
4	September 26	**Miami Dolphins**	**L** 13–22	2–1	Rich Stadium	79,635
5	October 3	New York Giants	**W** 17–14	3–1	Rich Stadium	79,283
6	October 11	Houston Oilers	**W** 35–7	4–1	Rich Stadium	79,613
7	Bye					
8	October 24	at **New York Jets**	**W** 19–10	5–1	Giants Stadium	71,541
9	November 1	Washington Redskins	**W** 24–10	6–1	Rich Stadium	79,106
10	November 7	at **New England Patriots**	**W** 13–10 (OT)	7–1	Foxboro Stadium	54,326
11	November 15	at Pittsburgh Steelers	**L** 0–23	7–2	Three Rivers Stadium	60,265
12	November 21	**Indianapolis Colts**	**W** 23–9	8–2	Rich Stadium	79,101
13	November 28	at Kansas City Chiefs	**L** 7–23	8–3	Arrowhead Stadium	74,452
14	December 5	Los Angeles Raiders	**L** 24–25	8–4	Rich Stadium	79,478
15	December 12	at Philadelphia Eagles	**W** 10–7	9–4	Veterans Stadium	60,769
16	December 19	at **Miami Dolphins**	**W** 47–34	10–4	Joe Robbie Stadium	71,597
17	December 26	**New York Jets**	**W** 16–14	11–4	Rich Stadium	70,817
18	January 2, 1994	at **Indianapolis Colts**	**W** 30–10	12–4	Hoosier Dome	43,028
Note: Intra-division opponents are in **bold** text.

=== Game summaries ===
==== Week 1 ====
Week One: New England Patriots at Buffalo Bills – Game summary

Quarter	1	2	3	4	Total
Patriots	0	7	7	0	**14**
**Bills**	0	17	0	21	**38**

at Rich Stadium, Orchard Park, New York

- Date: September 5
- Game time: 1:00 p.m.
- Game weather: 66 °F (19 °C), wind 12 mph (19 km/h)
- Referee: Gerald Austin
- TV announcers (NBC): Tom Hammond and Cris Collinsworth
- Box Score

Scoring summary

Quarter	Time	Drive			Team	Scoring information	Score	
Quarter	Time	Plays	Yards	TOP	Team	Scoring information	Patriots	Bills
2					Bills	28-yard field goal by Steve Christie	0	3
2					Bills	Bill Brooks 4-yard touchdown reception from Jim Kelly, Steve Christie kick good	0	10
2					Patriots	Ben Coates 54-yard touchdown reception from Drew Bledsoe, Scott Sisson kick good	7	10
2					Bills	Andre Reed 41-yard touchdown reception from Jim Kelly, Steve Christie kick good	7	17
3					Patriots	Greg McMurtry 2-yard touchdown reception from Drew Bledsoe, Scott Sisson kick good	14	17
4					Bills	Andre Reed 22-yard touchdown reception from Jim Kelly, Steve Christie kick good	14	24
4					Bills	Andre Reed 14-yard touchdown reception from Jim Kelly, Steve Christie kick good	14	31
4					Bills	Punt returned 47 yards for touchdown by Russell Copeland, Steve Christie kick good	14	38
"TOP" = time of possession. For other American football terms, see Glossary of American football.							14	38

==== Week 2 ====
Team	1	2	3	4	Total
• Bills	7	3	0	3	13
Cowboys	0	3	0	7	10

- Date: September 12
- Location: Texas Stadium, Irving, Texas
- Game start: 3:00 p.m.
- Game weather: 85 °F (29 °C), wind 16 mph (26 km/h)
- Referee: Bernie Kukar
- TV announcers (NBC): Dick Enberg and Bob Trumpy

Scoring summary
1	BUF	Carwell Gardner 10 yard pass from Jim Kelly (Steve Christie kick)	Bills 7–0
2	BUF	Steve Christie 48 yard field goal	Bills 10–0
2	DAL	Lin Elliott 43 yard field goal	Bills 10–3
4	DAL	Kevin Williams 5 yard run (Lin Elliott kick)	Tie 10–10
4	BUF	Steve Christie 35 yard field goal	Bills 13–10

==== Week 3 ====
Team	1	2	3	4	Total
• Dolphins	16	3	3	0	22
Bills	0	6	0	7	13

- Date: September 26
- Location: Rich Stadium, Orchard Park, New York
- Game start: 1:00 p.m. EST
- Game attendance: 79,635
- Game weather: 61 °F (16 °C) • 16 miles per hour (26 km/h; 14 kn), rain (at start of game)
- Referee: Johnny Grier
- TV announcers (NBC): Dick Enberg, Paul Maguire

==== Week 5 ====
Week Five: New York Giants (3–0) at Buffalo Bills (2–1)

Quarter	1	2	3	4	Total
Giants	0	14	0	0	**14**
Bills	10	0	0	7	**17**

at Rich Stadium • Orchard Park, New York

- Date: October 3
- Game time: 8:00 p.m. EST
- Game weather: 47 °F (8 °C) • 15 miles per hour (24 km/h; 13 kn)
- Game attendance: 79,283
- Referee: Gordon McCarter
- TV announcers (TNT): Gary Bender and Pat Haden
- Pro-Football-Reference.com

Game information

Giants

- Phil Simms
  12/28, 160 Yds, 2 TD, 3 INT
- Rodney Hampton
  32 Rush, 86 Yds
- Dave Meggett
  2 Rec, 37 Yds
- Mike Sherrard
  2 Rec, 37 Yds

Bills

- Jim Kelly
  14/25, 142 Yds, TD, INT
- Thurman Thomas
  26 Rush, 122 Yds
- Pete Metzelaars
  6 Rec, 44 Yds, TD

Scoring summary

Quarter	Time	Drive			Team	Scoring information	Score	
Quarter	Time	Plays	Yards	TOP	Team	Scoring information	NYG	BUF
1					Bills	24-yard field goal by Steve Christie	0	3
1					Bills	Interception returned 85 yards for touchdown by Henry Jones, Steve Christie kick good	0	10
2					Giants	Chris Calloway 5-yard touchdown reception from Phil Simms, David Treadwell kick good	7	10
2					Giants	Mark Jackson 3-yard touchdown reception from Phil Simms, David Treadwell kick good	14	10
4					Bills	Pete Metzelaars 8-yard touchdown reception from Jim Kelly, Steve Christie kick good	14	17
"TOP" = time of possession. For other American football terms, see Glossary of American football.							14	17

==== Week 6 ====
Team	1	2	3	4	Total
Oilers	7	0	0	0	7
• Bills	7	21	0	7	35

- Date: October 11
- Location: Rich Stadium, Orchard Park, New York
- Game start: 9:00 p.m. EST
- Game attendance: 79,613
- Game weather: 41 °F (5 °C) • 9 miles per hour (14 km/h; 7.8 kn)
- Referee: Tom White (American football official)
- TV announcers (ABC): Frank Gifford, Al Michaels, Dan Dierdorf

Scoring summary
Q1	BUF	Don Beebe 34 yard pass from Jim Kelly (Steve Christie kick)	BUF 7–0
Q1	HOU	Leonard Harris 17 yard pass from Warren Moon (Al Del Greco kick)	Tie 7–7
Q2	BUF	Andre Reed 24 yard pass from Jim Kelly (Steve Christie kick)	BUF 14–7
Q2	BUF	Andre Reed 39 yard pass from Jim Kelly (Steve Christie kick)	BUF 21–7
Q2	BUF	Thurman Thomas 7 yard run (Steve Christie kick)	BUF 28–7
Q4	BUF	Kenneth Davis 3 yard run (Steve Christie kick)	BUF 35–7

==== Week 8 ====
Buffalo Bills (4–1) at New York Jets (2–3)

Team	1	2	3	4	Total
• Bills	0	6	7	6	19
Jets	7	0	0	3	10

- Date: October 24
- Game start: 1:00 PM EST
- Game attendance: 71,541
- Game weather: 55 °F (13 °C) • 14 miles per hour (23 km/h; 12 kn)
- TV announcers (NBC): Dick Enberg and Bob Trumpy

Scoring summary
Q1	NYJ	Brad Baxter 1 yard rush (Cary Blanchard kick)	NYJ 7–0
Q2	BUF	Steve Christie 37 yard field goal	NYJ 7–3
Q2	BUF	Steve Christie 33 yard field goal	NYJ 7–6
Q3	BUF	Darryl Talley 61 yard interception return (Steve Christie kick)	BUF 13–7
Q4	BUF	Steve Christie 22 yard field goal	BUF 16–7
Q4	NYJ	Cary Blanchard 33 yard field goal	BUF 16–10
Q4	BUF	Steve Christie 30 yard field goal	BUF 19–10

==== Week 9 ====
November 1, 1993.

Team	1	2	3	4	Total
Redskins	7	3	0	0	10
• Bills	14	0	7	3	24

- Date: November 1
- Location: Rich Stadium, Orchard Park, New York
- Game start: 9:00 p.m. EST
- Game attendance: 79,106
- Game weather: 32 °F (0 °C) • 13 miles per hour (21 km/h; 11 kn)
- Referee: Larry Nemmers
- TV announcers (Monday Night Football): Al Michaels, Frank Gifford, and Dan Dierdorf

Scoring summary
Q1	9:00	BUF	Andre Reed 65 yard pass from Kelly (Christie kick)	BUF 7–0
Q1	4:35	WSH	Reggie Brooks 7 yard rush (Chip Lohmiller kick)	TIE 7–7
Q1	0:10	BUF	Bill Brooks (American football) 11 yard pass from Jim Kelly (Steve Christie kick)	BUF 14–7
Q2	8:24	WSH	Chip Lohmiller 19 yard field goal	BUF 14–10
Q3	5:27	BUF	Thurman Thomas 1 yard rush (Steve Christie kick)	BUF 21–10
Q4	11:25	BUF	Steve Christie 45 yard field goal	BUF 24–10

==== Week 12 ====
Team	1	2	3	4	Total
Colts	3	3	3	0	9
• Bills	0	16	7	0	23

- Date: November 21, 1993
- Location: Rich Stadium, Orchard Park, New York
- Game start: 1:00 p.m. EST
- Game attendance: 79,101
- Game weather: 37 °F (3 °C) • 21 miles per hour (34 km/h; 18 kn)
- Referee: Jerry Markbreit
- TV announcers (NBC): Dan Hicks, Dan Hampton

==== Week 13 ====
Buffalo Bills (8–2) at Kansas City Chiefs (7–3)

Team	1	2	3	4	Total
Bills	7	0	0	0	7
• Chiefs	7	3	10	3	23

- Date: November 28
- Location: Arrowhead Stadium, Kansas City, Missouri
- Game start: 4:00 p.m. EST
- Game attendance: 74,452
- Game weather: 29 °F (−2 °C) • 11 miles per hour (18 km/h; 9.6 kn)
- Referee: Dale Hamer
- TV announcers (NFL on NBC): Marv Albert, Mike Ditka

Scoring summary
1	4:14	BUF	Kenneth Davis (American football) 9 yard rush (Steve Christie kick)	Bills 7–0
1		KC	Marcus Allen 18 yard pass from Joe Montana (Nick Lowery kick)	TIE 7–7
2		KC	Nick Lowery 30 yard field goal	Chiefs 10–7
3		KC	Keith Cash 1 yard pass from Joe Montana (Nick Lowery kick)	Chiefs 17–7
3		KC	Nick Lowery 22 yard field goal	Chiefs 20–7
4		KC	Nick Lowery 34 yard field goal	Chiefs 23–7

==== Week 14 ====
Los Angeles Raiders (6–5) at Buffalo Bills (8–3)

Team	1	2	3	4	Total
• Raiders	3	7	6	9	25
Bills	0	14	3	7	24

- Date: December 5
- Location: Rich Stadium Orchard Park, NY
- Game start: 1:00 PM EST
- Game attendance: 79,478
- Game weather: 37 °F (3 °C) • 13 miles per hour (21 km/h; 11 kn); wind chill 29
- Referee: Bob McElwee
- TV announcers (NBC): Charlie Jones and Todd Christensen

Scoring summary
1	7:43	Raiders	Jeff Jaeger 37 yard field goal	Raiders 3–0
2		Bills	Thurman Thomas 3 yard rush (Steve Christie kick)	Bills 7–3
2		Raiders	Jeff Hostetler 11 yard rush (Jeff Jaeger kick)	Raiders 10–7
2		Bills	Don Beebe 65 yard pass from Jim Kelly (Christie kick)	Bills 14–10
3		Raiders	Jeff Jaeger 34 yard field goal	Bills 14–13
3		Bills	Steve Christie 35 yard field goal	Bills 17–13
3		Raiders	Jeff Jaeger 26 yard field goal	Bills 17–16
4		Bills	Thurman Thomas 1 yard rush (Steve Christie kick)	Bills 24–16
4		Raiders	Jeff Jaeger 47 yard field goal	Bills 24–19
4		Raiders	Tim Brown 29 yard pass from Jeff Hostetler	Raiders 25–24

==== Week 15 ====
Team	1	2	3	4	Total
• Bills	9	17	21	0	47
Eagles	7	13	7	7	34

- Date: December 12th, 1993
- Location: Veterans Stadium • Philadelphia
- Game start: 1:00 p.m. EST
- Game attendance: 60,769
- Game weather: 30 °F (−1 °C) • 21 miles per hour (34 km/h; 18 kn); wind chill 17
- Referee: Johnny Grier
- TV announcers (NBC): Marv Albert and Paul Maguire

==== Week 16 ====
Buffalo (9–4) at Miami (9–4)

Team	1	2	3	4	Total
• Bills	9	17	21	0	47
Dolphins	7	13	7	7	34

- Date: December 19
- Location: Joe Robbie Stadium, Miami Gardens, Florida
- Game start: 1:00 p.m. EST
- Elapsed time: 2:59.44
- Game attendance: 71,597
- Game weather: 71 °F (22 °C) • 7 miles per hour (11 km/h; 6.1 kn)
- Referee: Howard Roe
- TV announcers (NFL on NBC): Dick Enberg, Bob Trumpy

==== Week 17 ====
Team	1	2	3	4	Total
Jets	7	0	7	0	14
• Bills	7	6	0	3	16

- Date: December 26, 1993
- Location: Rich Stadium, Orchard Park, NY
- Game start: 1:00 p.m. EST
- Game attendance: 70,817
- Game weather: 9 °F (−13 °C) • 23 miles per hour (37 km/h; 20 kn)
- Referee: Ed Hochuli
- TV announcers (NFL on NBC): Don Criqui, Paul Maguire

=== Standings ===
AFC East
	W	L	T	PCT	PF	PA	STK
^{(1)} Buffalo Bills	12	4	0	.750	329	242	W4
Miami Dolphins	9	7	0	.563	349	351	L5
New York Jets	8	8	0	.500	270	247	L3
New England Patriots	5	11	0	.313	238	286	W4
Indianapolis Colts	4	12	0	.250	189	378	L4

== Playoffs ==
Round	Date	Opponent (seed)	Result	Record	Venue	Attendance
Divisional	January 15, 1994	Los Angeles Raiders (4)	W 29–23	1–0	Rich Stadium	61,923
AFC Championship	January 23, 1994	Kansas City Chiefs (3)	W 30–13	2–0	Rich Stadium	76,642
Super Bowl XXVIII	January 30, 1994	vs. Dallas Cowboys (N1)	L 13–30	2–1	Georgia Dome	72,817

== Super Bowl XXVIII ==
Quarter	1	2	3	4	Total
Cowboys	6	0	14	10	30
Bills	3	10	0	0	13

at Georgia Dome, Atlanta, Georgia

- Date: January 30, 1994

With the loss, the Bills secured an NFL record 4 consecutive Super Bowl losses, with 3 out of 4 being multi-possession losses. As of 2025, this remains the Bills last Super Bowl appearance.

=== Scoring Summary ===
- DAL – FG: Eddie Murray 41 yards 3–0 DAL
- BUF – FG: Steve Christie 54 yards 3–3 tie
- DAL – FG: Eddie Murray 24 yards 6–3 DAL
- BUF – TD: Thurman Thomas 4 yard run (Steve Christie kick) 10–6 BUF
- BUF – FG: Steve Christie 28 yards 13–6 BUF
- DAL – TD: James Washington 46 yard fumble return (Eddie Murray kick) 13–13 tie
- DAL – TD: Emmitt Smith 17 yard run (Eddie Murray kick) 20–13 DAL
- DAL – TD: Emmitt Smith 1 yard run (Eddie Murray kick) 27–13 DAL
- DAL – FG: Eddie Murray 20 yards 30–13 DAL

== Awards and records ==
- Nate Odomes, Tied NFL Lead, 9 Interceptions
- Bruce Smith, Newspaper Enterprise Association Defensive Player of the Year Award
- Thurman Thomas, AFC Leader, 1,315 Rushing Yards
