= List of Miracles group members =

A chronology of the different lineups in the history of Motown singing group the Miracles.

== Group chronology ==
The Miracles
The Five Chimes
1955–1956	Smokey Robinson	Ronnie White	Pete Moore	Clarence Dawson	James Grice	
The Matadors
1956	Smokey Robinson	Ronnie White	Pete Moore	Bobby Rogers	Emerson "Sonny" Rogers	
The Matadors
1956–1958	Smokey Robinson	Ronnie White	Pete Moore	Bobby Rogers	Claudette Rogers	
The Miracles (classic lineup)
1958–1966	Smokey Robinson	Ronnie White	Pete Moore	Bobby Rogers	Claudette Robinson	Marv Tarplin
Smokey Robinson & the Miracles
1966–1972	Smokey Robinson	Ronnie White	Pete Moore	Bobby Rogers	Claudette Robinson	Marv Tarplin
The Miracles
1972–1973	Billy Griffin	Ronnie White	Pete Moore	Bobby Rogers		Marv Tarplin
1973–1978	Billy Griffin	Ronnie White	Pete Moore	Bobby Rogers		Donald Griffin
1978–1983	Carl Cotton	Ronnie White	Dave Finley	Bobby Rogers		
1983–1993						
1993–1995	Sidney Justin	Ronnie White	Dave Finley	Bobby Rogers		
1995–2001	Sidney Justin	—	Dave Finley	Bobby Rogers		
2001–2003	Sidney Justin	Tee Turner	Dave Finley	Bobby Rogers		
2003–2008	Mark Scott	Tee Turner	Dave Finley	Bobby Rogers	Claudette Robinson	
2008-2008	Alphonse Franklin	Tee Turner	Dave Finley	Bobby Rogers	Claudette Robinson	
2008–2011	Mark Scott	Tee Turner	Dave Finley	Bobby Rogers	Claudette Robinson	

== The Five Chimes ==
=== 1955–1956 ===
- Smokey Robinson
- Ronnie White
- Pete Moore
- Clarence Dawson
- James Grice

== The Matadors ==
=== 1956–1956 ===
- Smokey Robinson
- Ronnie White
- Pete Moore
- Bobby Rogers
- Emerson "Sonny" Rogers (cousin of Bobby, brother of Claudette, replaced Dawson and Grice)

=== 1956–1958 ===
- Smokey Robinson
- Ronnie White
- Pete Moore
- Bobby Rogers
- Claudette Rogers (replaced her brother Emerson "Sonny" Rogers, who was drafted into the U.S. Armed Forces)

== The Miracles (the classic lineup) ==
=== 1958–1966 ===
- Smokey Robinson
- Ronnie White
- Pete Moore
- Bobby Rogers
- Claudette Robinson (Claudette and Smokey married in 1959)
- Marv Tarplin (guitars)

== Smokey Robinson & the Miracles ==
=== 1966–1972 ===
(same members; group name changed to spotlight lead singer)

- Smokey Robinson
- Ronnie White
- Pete Moore
- Bobby Rogers
- Marv Tarplin
- Claudette Robinson (though she remained as a non-touring member of The Miracles performing background vocals, she retired from live performing from 1964 until Smokey's last show with the Miracles in 1972)

== The Miracles ==
=== 1972–1973 ===
- Billy Griffin (Smokey Robinson departs, replaced by Billy Griffin; Claudette also retires)
- Ronnie White
- Pete Moore
- Bobby Rogers
- Marv Tarplin

=== 1973–1978 ===
- Billy Griffin
- Ronnie White
- Pete Moore
- Bobby Rogers
- Donald Griffin (Donald Griffin, brother of Billy Griffin, replaced original member Marv Tarplin, who left to tour and work with Smokey)

=== 1978–1983 ===
- Dave Finley
- Carl Cotton
- Ronnie White
- Bobby Rogers (Miracles Pete Moore & Billy Griffin retired from performing to focus on songwriting; Donald Griffin also leaves)

=== 1993–1995 ===
- Sidney Justin (Carl Cotton leaves group; was murdered in 2003)
- Dave Finley
- Ronnie White
- Bobby Rogers

=== 1995–2001 ===
- Sidney Justin
- Dave Finley
- Bobby Rogers (original Miracle Ronnie White died in 1995)

=== 2001–2003 ===
- Sidney Justin
- Dave Finley
- Tee Turner
- Bobby Rogers

=== 2003–2011 ===
- Mark Scott* (replaced Sidney Justin; Alphonse Franklin filled in for Scott from June to December 2008)
- Dave Finley
- Tee Turner
- Bobby Rogers
- Claudette Robinson – special guest appearances
