= Gbaja-Biamila =

Gbaja-Biamila or Gbajabiamila is a surname. Notable people with the surname include:

- Akbar Gbaja-Biamila (born 1979), American football linebacker
- Femi Gbajabiamila (born 1962), Nigerian lawyer, Action Congress politician, and Speaker of the House of Representatives
- Kabeer Gbaja-Biamila (born 1977), American football defensive end
