= List of Indianapolis Colts team records =

This article lists the statistical records of the Indianapolis Colts, a team competing in the National Football League (NFL). These records include the team's career, single-season, and single-game records.

The Indianapolis Colts are a professional football team based in Indianapolis, Indiana. They are a member of the American Football Conference and compete in the South Division. In 1953, a Baltimore-based group led by Carroll Rosenbloom won the rights to a new Baltimore football franchise. Rosenbloom was granted an NFL team, and was awarded the holdings of the defunct Dallas Texans organization. The team was known as the Baltimore Colts for 31 seasons before moving to Indianapolis in March 1984.

Records on this list include players from both cities where the Colts have competed, as the team's history transferred to Indianapolis when they relocated.

== Career records ==
All statistics are accurate through the end of the 2024 NFL season.

=== Service ===
- Most games played: 211 - Reggie Wayne, (2001–2014)
- Most consecutive games played: 208 - Peyton Manning, (1998–2010)
- Most seasons: 17 - Johnny Unitas, (1956–1972)

=== Offense ===
==== Scoring ====
- Most points (career): 1,515 - Adam Vinatieri, (2006–2019)
- Most total touchdowns (career): 128 - Marvin Harrison, (1996–2008)

==== Passing ====
- Most attempts (career): 7,210 - Peyton Manning, (1998–2010)
- Most completions (career): 4,682 - Peyton Manning, (1998–2010)
- Highest completion percentage (career - min. 1,000 att.): 64.9 - Peyton Manning, (1998–2010)
- Highest average yards/completion (career - min. 1,000 att.): 14.22 - Johnny Unitas, (1956–1972)
- Most passing yards (career): 54,828 - Peyton Manning, (1998–2010)
- Most interceptions (career): 246 - Johnny Unitas, (1956–1972)
- Highest passer rating (career): 94.9 - Peyton Manning, (1998–2010)
- Most passing touchdowns (career): 399 - Peyton Manning, (1998–2010)

==== Rushing ====
- Most attempts (career): 2,188 - Edgerrin James, (1999–2005)
- Most rushing yards (career): 9,226 - Edgerrin James, (1999–2005)
- Most rushing touchdowns (career): 69 - Jonathan Taylor, (2020–2025)
- Highest average yards/carry (career - min. 300 att.): 4.9 - Jonathan Taylor, (2020–2025)

==== Receiving ====
- Most receptions (career): 1,102 - Marvin Harrison, (1996–2008)
- Most receiving yards (career): 14,580 - Marvin Harrison, (1996–2008)
- Highest receiving average (career - min. 100 rec.): 19.3 - Jimmy Orr, (1961–1970)
- Most receiving touchdowns (career): 128 - Marvin Harrison, (1996–2008)

=== Defense ===
- Most sacks (career): 123 - Robert Mathis, (2003–2016)
- Most interceptions (career): 57 - Bobby Boyd, (1960–1968)
- Most interceptions for touchdowns (career): 5 - Jerry Logan, (1963–1972)

=== Special Teams ===
==== Kicking ====
- Most PAT attempts (career): 524 - Adam Vinatieri, (2006–2019)
- Most PATs made (career): 507 - Adam Vinatieri, (2006–2019)
- Highest PAT percentage (career - min. 50 att.): 100 - Cary Blanchard, (1995–1997)
- Most field goal attempts (career): 394 - Adam Vinatieri, (2006–2019)
- Most field goals made (career): 336 - Adam Vinatieri, (2006–2019)
- Highest field goal percentage (career - min 30 att): 87.5 - Mike Vanderjagt, (1998–2005)
- Longest field goal made: 60 yards - Blake Grupe, (December 14, 2025 at Sea)

==== Punting ====
- Most punts (career): 985 - Rohn Stark, (1982–1994)
- Most touchbacks (career): 111 - Rohn Stark, (1982–1994)
- Most punts inside the 20 (career): 224 - Rohn Stark, (1982–1994)
- Highest punt average (career - min. 75 att.): 46.4 - Pat McAfee, (2009–2016)
- Longest punt: 79 yards - Rigoberto Sanchez, (October 24, 2021 at S.F.)

==== Returns ====
- Most kickoff return touchdowns (career): 2 Lenny Lyles, (1958, 1961–1969)
- Longest kickoff return: 104 yards - Buddy Young, (November 15, 1953 at Phi)
- Most punt return touchdowns (career): 4 - Clarence Verdin, (1988–1993)
- Longest punt rerturn: 90 - Carl Taseff, (October 14, 1956 at G.B.); T.J. Rushing, (December 16, 2007 at Oak)

== Season records ==
=== Offense ===
==== Scoring ====
- Most points (season): 157 - Mike Vanderjagt, (2003)
- Most non-kick scoring points (season): 120 - Lenny Moore, (1964); Jonathan Taylor, (2021)
- Most touchdowns (season): 20 - Lenny Moore, (1964)

==== Passing ====
- Most attempts (season): 679 - Peyton Manning, (2010)
- Most completions (season): 450 - Peyton Manning, (2010)
- Highest completion percentage (season - min. 200 att.): 68.8 - Peyton Manning, (2009)
- Highest average yards/completion (season - min. 200 att.): 17.87 - Johnny Unitas, (1964)
- Most passing yards (season): 4,761 - Andrew Luck, (2014)
- Most interceptions (season): 28 - Peyton Manning, (1998)
- Highest passer rating (season): 121.1 - Peyton Manning, (2004)
- Most passing touchdowns (season): 49 - Peyton Manning, (2004)

==== Rushing ====
- Most attempts (season): 388 - Eric Dickerson, (1988)
- Most rushing yards (season): 1,811 - Jonathan Taylor, (2021)
- Most rushing touchdowns (season): 18 - Jonathan Taylor (2), (2021, 2025)
- Highest average yards/carry (season - min. 80 att.): 7.5 - Lenny Moore, (1956)

==== Receiving ====
- Most receptions (season): 143 - Marvin Harrison, (2002)
- Most receiving yards (season): 1,722 - Marvin Harrison, (2002)
- Highest receiving average (season - min. 30 rec.): 25.9 - Roger Carr, (1976)
- Most receiving touchdowns (season): 15 - Marvin Harrison (2), (2002, 2004)

=== Defense ===
- Most sacks (season): 19.5 - Robert Mathis, (2013)
- Most interceptions (season): 11 - Tom Keane, (1953)
- Most interceptions for touchdowns (season): 3 - Ray Buchanan, (1994)

=== Special Teams ===
==== Kicking ====
- Most PAT attempts (season): 60 - Mike Vanderjagt, (2004)
- Most PATs made (season): 59 - Mike Vanderjagt, (2004)
- Highest PAT percentage (season - min. 20 att.): 100 - (tied by 10+ players)
- Most field goal attempts (season): 41 - Cary Blanchard, (1997)
- Most field goals made (season - min 16 att.): 37 - Mike Vanderjagt, (2003)
- Highest field goal percentage (season - min 20 att.): 100 - Mike Vanderjagt, (2003)

==== Punting ====
- Most punts (season): 99 - Bucky Dilts, (1979)
- Most touchbacks (season): 14 - Rohn Stark, (1985)
- Most punts inside the 20 (season): 30 - Pat McAfee, (2014)
- Highest punt average (season - min. 32 att.): 49.3 - Pat McAfee, (2016)

==== Returns ====
- Most kickoff return touchdowns (season): 2 - Lenny Lyles, (1958); Preston Pearson, (1968)
- Most punt return touchdowns (season): 2 - Nyheim Hines, (2019)

== Single-game records ==
=== Offense ===
==== Scoring ====
- Most points (game): 30 - Jonathan Taylor, (Nov. 21, 2021 at Buf)
- Most kick scoring points (game): 18 - Chase McLaughlin, (Dec. 17, 2022 at Min); Lou Michaels, (Sept. 25, 1966 vs S.F.)
- Most touchdowns (game): 5 - Jonathan Taylor, (Nov. 21, 2021 at Buf)

==== Passing ====
- Most attempts (game): 62 - Andrew Luck, (Sept. 30, 2018 vs Hou)
- Most completions (game): 42 - Matt Ryan, (Oct. 16, 2022 vs Jax)
- Highest completion percentage (game - min. 15 att.): 87.5 (14-16) - Peyton Manning, (Dec. 30, 2007 vs Ten)
- Highest average yards/completion (game - min. 20 att.): 22.25 - Johnny Unitas, (Nov. 26, 1960 vs S.F.)
- Most passing yards (game): 472 - Peyton Manning, (Oct. 31, 2004 at K.C.)
- Most interceptions (game): 6 - Peyton Manning, (Nov. 11, 2007 at S.D.)
- Most passing touchdowns (game): 6 - Peyton Manning, (Sept. 28, 2003 at N.O. and Nov. 25, 2004 at Det)

==== Rushing ====
- Most attempts (game): 40 - Lydell Mitchell, (Oc. 20, 1974 at NYJ)
- Most rushing yards (game): 253 - Jonathan Taylor, (Jan. 3, 2021 vs Jax)
- Most rushing touchdowns (game): 4 - Jonathan Taylor, (Nov. 21, 2021 at Buf)
- Highest average yards/carry (game - min. 10 att.): 14.2 - Lenny Moore, (Oct. 28, 1956 vs G.B.)

==== Receiving ====
- Most receptions (game): 15 - Reggie Wayne, (Oct. 3, 2010 at Jax)
- Most receiving yards (game): 224 - Raymond Berry, (Nov. 10, 1957 at Was)
- Highest receiving average (game - min. 3 rec.): 48.8 - Raymond Berry, (Oct. 30, 1960 at Dal)
- Most receiving touchdowns (game): 3 - (tied with 10+ players)

=== Defense ===
- Most sacks (game): 4.5 - Johnie Cooks, (Nov. 25, 1984 at LA Raiders)
- Most interceptions (game): 3 - (tied with 10+ players)

=== Special Teams ===
==== Kicking ====
- Most PATs made (game): 8 - Tom Feamster, (Nov. 5, 1956 vs L.A. Rams); Steve Myhra, (Nov. 2, 1958 vs G.B.)
- Most field goals made (game): 5 - (tied by 10+ players)

==== Punting ====
- Most punts (game): 12 - Chris Gardocki, (Oct. 6, 1996 at Buf)
- Most touchbacks (game): 4 - Rohn Stark, (Three games)
- Most punts inside the 20 (game): 6 - Pat McAfee, (Oct. 20, 2013 vs Den)
- Highest punt average (game - min. 3 att.): 57.7 - Hunter Smith, (Sept. 23, 2007 at Hou)

== Career leaders ==
All lists are accurate through the 2025 season.

Bold denotes player currently plays for the Colts.

=== Passing leaders ===
**Top 10 career**
**Name**	**Seasons**	**Yards**
Peyton Manning	1998–2010	54,828
Johnny Unitas	1956–1972	39,768
Andrew Luck	2012–2018	23,671
Bert Jones	1973–1981	17,663
Jack Trudeau	1986–1993	9,647
Jeff George	1990–1993	9,551
Jim Harbaugh	1994–1997	8,705
Mike Pagel	1982–1985	7,474
Jacoby Brissett	2017–2020	6,059
Earl Morrall	1968–1971	5,666

=== Receiving leaders ===
**Top 10 career**
**Name**	**Seasons**	**Yards**
Marvin Harrison	1996–2008	14,580
Reggie Wayne	2001–2014	14,345
T.Y. Hilton	2012–2021	9,691
Raymond Berry	1955–1967	9,275
Lenny Moore	1956–1967	6,039
Jimmy Orr	1961–1970	5,859
Bill Brooks	1986–1992	5,818
Michael Pittman Jr.	2020–2025	5,254
John Mackey	1963–1971	5,126
Dallas Clark	2003–2011	4,887

=== Rushing leaders ===
**Top 10 career**
**Name**	**Seasons**	**Yards**
Edgerrin James	1999–2005	9,226
**Jonathan Taylor**	2020–Present	7,598
Lydell Mitchell	1972–1977	5,487
Marshall Faulk	1994–1998	5,320
Eric Dickerson	1987–1991	5,194
Lenny Moore	1955–1967	5,174
Tom Matte	1961–1972	4,646
Joseph Addai	2006–2011	4,453
Alan Ameche	1955–1960	4,045
Randy McMillan	1981–1986	3,876

== See also ==
- List of National Football League records (individual)
