= Michael Williams (defensive back) =

American gridiron football player (born 1970)

No. 45
- Position: Defensive back

Personal information
- Born: May 28, 1970 (age 56); Los Angeles, California, U.S.
- Listed height: 5 ft 10 in (1.78 m)
- Listed weight: 185 lb (84 kg)

Career information
- High school: Crenshaw (Los Angeles)
- College: UCLA (1989–1992)
- NFL draft: 1993: undrafted

Career history
- San Diego Chargers (1993)*; San Jose SaberCats (1995); San Francisco 49ers (1995); San Jose SaberCats (1997–1999)
- * Offseason or practice squad member only
- Stats at Pro Football Reference
- Stats at ArenaFan.com

Michael Dean Williams (born May 28, 1970) is an American former professional football defensive back who played one season with the San Francisco 49ers of the National Football League (NFL). He played college football at the University of California, Los Angeles. He also played for the San Jose SaberCats of the Arena Football League (AFL).

== Early life and college ==
Michael Dean Williams was born on May 28, 1970, in Los Angeles, California. He attended Crenshaw High School in South Los Angeles, California.

He lettered for the UCLA Bruins of the University of California, Los Angeles from 1989 to 1992.

== Professional career ==
After going undrafted in the 1993 NFL draft, Williams was signed by the San Diego Chargers on April 27, 1993. He was waived on August 30 and signed to the Chargers' practice squad on September 1, 1993. He became a free agent after the 1993 season and re-signed with the team on March 11, 1994. Williams was released by the Chargers on August 22, 1994.

Williams played in two games for the San Jose SaberCats of the Arena Football League (AFL) during the 1995 AFL season as a wide receiver/defensive back, totaling one solo tackle, one assisted tackle, and one reception for five yards. He played both offense and defense during his time in the AFL as the league played under ironman rules.

Williams signed with the San Francisco 49ers on April 25, 1995. He was waived on August 19 and signed to the 49ers' practice squad on August 30. He was promoted to the active roster on September 5 and played in four games for the team during the 1995 season, recording 31 solo tackles, 11 assisted tackles, and two forced fumbles, before being released on October 3. Williams was re-signed to the practice squad two days later. He became a free agent after the season and re-signed with the 49ers on February 25, 1996. He was released on August 12, 1996.

Williams returned to the SaberCats in 1997 and appeared in three games for them that year, posting four solo tackles and catching one pass for seven yards. He played in ten games for the SaberCats in 1998, registering 19 solo tackles, four assisted tackles, one interception, and two pass breakups. He played in 13 games during his final AFL season in 1999, accumulating 35 solo tackles, nine assisted tackles, one interception, and eight pass breakups.
