= Kerry Justin =

American football player (born 1955)

No. 26
- Position: Cornerback

Personal information
- Born: May 3, 1955 (age 71); New Orleans, Louisiana, U.S.
- Listed height: 5 ft 11 in (1.80 m)
- Listed weight: 175 lb (79 kg)

Career information
- High school: Crenshaw (Los Angeles, California)
- College: Oregon State
- NFL draft: 1978: undrafted

Career history
- Seattle Seahawks (1978–1983); New Jersey Generals (1984–1985); Seattle Seahawks (1986–1987)

Career NFL statistics
- Interceptions: 7
- Forced fumbles: 8
- Sacks: 1
- Stats at Pro Football Reference

Kerry August Justin (born May 3, 1955) is an American former professional football player who was a cornerback in the National Football League (NFL).

Justin was born in New Orleans, Louisiana and attended Crenshaw High School in Los Angeles, California. He played college football at Oregon State.

Justin was signed by the Seattle Seahawks as an undrafted free agent in 1978. He spent six seasons with the Seahawks, 1978–1983, before jumping to the United States Football League with the New Jersey Generals. He was with the Generals for two campaigns, 1984–1985, recording 8 interceptions in the second year. When the USFL folded following the 1985 season, Justin returned to the Seahawks for two more years, 1986–1987.

In eight seasons with the Seahawks, he had seven interceptions returned for 31 yards and three blocked punts which remains a team record.

== Personal life ==
Justin is a brother of USFL defensive back Tyrone Justin, gridiron defensive back Sid Justin, and the uncle of CFL and Baltimore Ravens defensive back Airabin Justin.
