= Lydell Mitchell =

American football player (born 1949)

- Mitchell in 1977

No. 26, 22
- Position: Running back

Personal information
- Born: May 30, 1949 (age 77); Salem, New Jersey, U.S.
- Listed height: 5 ft 11 in (1.80 m)
- Listed weight: 204 lb (93 kg)

Career information
- High school: Salem
- College: Penn State (1969–1971)
- NFL draft: 1972: 2nd round, 48th overall pick

Career history
- Baltimore Colts (1972–1977); San Diego Chargers (1978–1979); Los Angeles Rams (1980)

Awards and highlights
- 2× Second-team All-Pro (1976, 1977); 3× Pro Bowl (1975–1977); 2× NFL receptions leader (1974, 1977); First-team All-American (1971); First-team All-East (1971)

Career NFL statistics
- Games played: 111
- Starts: 84
- Rushing yards: 6,534 (3.9 average)
- Rushing touchdowns: 30
- Receptions: 376
- Receiving yards: 3,203
- Receiving touchdowns: 17
- Stats at Pro Football Reference
- College Football Hall of Fame

Lydell Douglas Mitchell (born May 30, 1949) is an American former professional football player who was a running back in the National Football League (NFL) from 1972 to 1980. During his nine-season NFL career, Mitchell played for the Baltimore Colts, San Diego Chargers and Los Angeles Rams.

Playing college football for the Penn State Nittany Lions, Mitchell set several NCAA and school rushing and scoring records. In the NFL, Mitchell was known for his versatility as both a runner and pass catcher. He earned two All-Pro Second-Team selections (1976, 1977) and three Pro Bowl selections (1975–1977) during his career. The first Colt in franchise history to gain 1,000 yards in a single season, Mitchell achieved the feat three times, as well as leading the NFL in receptions in 1974 and 1977.

== Early life ==
Lydell Mitchell was born on May 30, 1949, in Salem, New Jersey. Mitchell attended Salem High School, where he played football, basketball, and baseball.

On the Salem football team, Mitchell earned All-South Jersey honors as a sophomore. As a junior, Mitchell was injured in the middle of the season, but still managed to earn an All-South Jersey team honorable mention. In his senior season, Mitchell again earned All-South Jersey honors as a member of the Third Team.

Mitchell earned a football scholarship to play at Penn State following his high school career.

== College career ==
Mitchell played college football at Pennsylvania State University, where he and future Pro Football Hall of Fame running back Franco Harris joined head coach Joe Paterno's Nittany Lions following a 1969 undefeated season. As a freshman, Mitchell led the Penn State freshman squad in rushing and scoring. His first two years at Penn State were productive, and he and Harris formed a formidable rushing attack. Mitchell's senior season was one of the best in school history, and he set several Penn State and NCAA records.

Mitchell was inducted into the College Football Hall of Fame in 2004.

=== 1969 season ===
As a sophomore, Mitchell had an immediate impact. He and Franco Harris joined the varsity squad, and contributed to Penn State's second consecutive undefeated 11–0 season. The Nittany Lions finished at #2 in the AP poll, and earned a spot in the 1970 Orange Bowl where they defeated #6 Missouri 10–3. Mitchell recorded a 28-yard touchdown reception from quarterback Chuck Burkhart in the Orange Bowl victory. Mitchell split time at running back with Harris and senior Charlie Pittman, but still recorded 113 carries for 616 yards and six touchdowns on the season.

=== 1970 season ===
In 1970, Mitchell and Harris continued to post productive seasons. Penn State opened the year ranked at #7 in the AP poll and earned a season opening victory against Navy, 55–7. In the Navy game, Mitchell recorded 19 carries for 145 yards. The next two weeks, Penn State suffered upsets at the hands of #18 Colorado and Wisconsin to fall out of the top-25 rankings. Mitchell suffered a leg injury the following week against Boston College, which forced him to miss the Nittany Lions' loss to Syracuse. Penn State won their remaining five games of the season, finishing with a 7–3 record and a #20 ranking in the AP poll. Mitchell finished the season with 134 carries for 751 yards and six touchdowns.

=== 1971 season ===
Mitchell's 1971 senior season was one of the top individual performances in Penn State history. In #14 Penn State's opening game victory against Navy, Mitchell recorded five touchdowns and 103 rushing yards, breaking a Penn State single-game scoring record that had stood since 1917. The following week against Iowa, Mitchell recorded 29 carries for 211 yards and one touchdown in a 44–14 victory. In week three, Penn State almost lost in an upset to Air Force before a late game field goal gave them the 16–14 victory. Mitchell had 18 carries for 91 yards and one touchdown. The next week against Army, Mitchell again had a game-stealing performance with 161 rushing yards and three touchdowns in a 42–0 victory. In week five against Syracuse, Mitchell had 24 carries for 94 yards. In week six against Texas Christian, Mitchell continued his pursuit of Penn State records in a 66–14 victory. Mitchell had 22 carries for 177 yards and four touchdowns, while Franco Harris added 17 carries for 104 yards and one touchdown. Penn State set a new school record of 632 total offensive yards, with 484 rushing yards and 148 passing yards. Mitchell moved his season total touchdown mark to 14, tying Charlie Pittman for the Penn State season total record with five games remaining. The next week against West Virginia, Mitchell broke the Penn State single-season touchdown record by recording 24 carries for 128 yards and two touchdowns in the 35–7 victory.

In week seven against Maryland, Penn State again dominated with a 63–27 victory. For Mitchell, this game cemented his All-America status and brought him to the forefront of the Heisman Trophy watchlist. Mitchell started the game with a 33-yard touchdown on the first play from scrimmage. By the end of the game, he had 209 rushing yards and matched his career high with five touchdowns. During the game, Mitchell broke six Penn State records, including career rushing yards (passing Lenny Moore), single-season rushing yards (also passing Moore), most points in a season, most career points, and extended his single-season touchdown mark. After the victory, Penn State reached #5 in the AP poll, its highest ranking of the season.

The following week, Mitchell continued his record-setting streak in a 35–3 victory over North Carolina State. Mitchell recorded four touchdowns in the game, breaking the NCAA single-season touchdown record (later eclipsed that season by Long Beach State's Terry Metcalf). The next week, Penn State continued their undefeated streak with a 55–18 victory over the Pitt Panthers. Mitchell had 181 rushing yards and three touchdowns.

The Nittany Lions' only loss of the 1971 season came in the final regular season game against #12-ranked Tennessee. Penn State had four fumbles and their high-scoring offense was stifled by Tennessee's defense. Mitchell's only score came on a 14-yard reception from quarterback John Hufnagel.

Despite the loss to Tennessee, Penn State earned a bid to the 1972 Cotton Bowl where the #10 Nittany Lions faced #12 Texas. Penn State forced five fumbles and held Texas to just two field goals in a 30–6 victory. Mitchell had 27 carries for 146 yards and one touchdown, and was named the game's Offensive Most Valuable Player. Penn State finished the season at #5 in the AP poll with a 10–1 record.

Mitchell finished the 1971 season with 254 carries for 1,567 yards and 26 rushing touchdowns and added 16 receptions for 154 yards and three receiving touchdowns. He was voted to the 1971 AP All-America First-Team and finished fifth in the Heisman Trophy voting. He led Penn State in all rushing categories and led the NCAA in total points scored (174).

== Professional career ==
Mitchell was selected by the Baltimore Colts in the second round, 48th overall pick, of the 1972 NFL draft.

Mitchell established himself as one of the NFL's best all-around running backs in the mid-1970s. His ability to break free as a runner and his versatility as a pass catcher made him a dual threat on offense. Mitchell, along with teammate Bert Jones, propelled the Baltimore Colts to three consecutive AFC East Division titles, unseating a powerhouse Miami Dolphins team that had won back-to-back Super Bowls and topped the division for four straight years (1971–74).

=== Baltimore Colts (1972-1977) ===
In Mitchell's rookie season, he was third on the depth chart behind running backs Don McCauley and Don Nottingham. Mitchell appeared in 11 games and started one. He recorded 45 carries for 215 yard and one touchdown and added 18 receptions for 147 yards and one touchdown. Baltimore started the season at 1–4, firing head coach Don McCafferty after week five and replacing him with defensive line coach John Sandusky. The season was most notable for being the last for Johnny Unitas as a Colt, with the team finishing at 5–9.

In 1973, the Colts refreshed their roster with younger players and brought in rookie quarterback Bert Jones. Mitchell became the starter at running back and recorded 253 carries for 963 yards and two touchdowns. Mitchell's first career 100-yard rushing performance came in week three against the New Orleans Saints. He had 22 carries for 133 yards and one reception for five yards in the 14–10 victory. Under new head coach Howard Schnellenberger, the Colts went 4–10.

In 1974, Mitchell was again the Colts' leading rusher with 214 carries for 757 yards and five touchdowns. Despite being a running back, Mitchell led the NFL in receptions that year with 72 catches for 544 yards and two touchdowns. In week six, the Colts earned their first victory of the season against the New York Jets. Mitchell set a then-NFL record for most carries in a game with 40 attempts. In the final game of season, Mitchell caught 13 passes for 82 yards and two touchdowns. His 13 receptions secured his NFL lead in the category and broke the Colts' single-game record, previously held by Raymond Berry. Baltimore went 2–12, leading to Schnellenberger's mid-season dismissal. He was replaced by general manager Joe Thomas for the remainder of the season.

The 1975 season was a turning point for Mitchell's career. He topped the 1,000-yard rushing mark for the first time, with 289 carries for 1,193 yards and a career-high 11 rushing touchdowns. His 1,000-yard rushing performance was the first in Baltimore Colts' history. Mitchell added 60 receptions for 544 yards and six receiving touchdowns. In week six, Mitchell recorded his career-high rushing performance with 26 carries for 178 yards and one touchdown against the Kansas City Chiefs. Mitchell earned his first Pro Bowl selection and was named to the All-AFC Second-Team. The Colts went 10-4 under new head coach Ted Marchibroda, and won the AFC East division. Mitchell and the Colts faced his former Penn State teammate Franco Harris and the Pittsburgh Steelers in the first round of the 1975-76 NFL playoffs, losing 10–28.

In 1976, Mitchell again topped 1,000 rushing yards, leading the Colts for the third straight year. He finished the season with 289 carries for a career-high 1,200 yards and five touchdowns and added 60 receptions for 555 yards and three receiving touchdowns. Mitchell's best performance of the season came in week eight against the Houston Oilers. Mitchell had 28 carries for 138 yards and seven receptions for 46 yards in a 38–14 victory. In week nine against the San Diego Chargers, Mitchell ran for 91 yards on 17 attempts and had eight receptions for 125 yards and one touchdown in a 37–21 victory. Baltimore went 11–3 in the regular season and earned a rematch against the Pittsburgh Steelers in the Divisional Round of the 1976-77 NFL playoffs. The Colts suffered the same fate as the previous year, losing 14–40. Mitchell was named to the 1976 All-Pro Second-Team and to his second straight Pro Bowl.

The 1977 season was Mitchell's last with Baltimore. The Colts started the season at 5–0, with Mitchell's best performance of that streak coming in week four against the Miami Dolphins. He rushed 17 times for 142 yards and one touchdown, with the touchdown coming on a 64-yard scramble on the game's first play from scrimmage. The Colts came back from a 28–10 deficit in the second quarter, scoring 35 unanswered points for a 45–28 win. In a week 13 loss to the Detroit Lions, Mitchell showcased his versatility with 22 carries for 94 yards and nine receptions for 88 yards and one receiving touchdown. Mitchell finished the regular season with over 1,000 rushing yards for the third consecutive season, totaling 301 carries for 1,159 yards and three rushing touchdowns. Mitchell also led the NFL in receptions for the second time in his career, with 71 catches for a career-high 620 yards and four receiving touchdowns. The Colts won the AFC East Division, going 10-4 during the regular season. For the third straight season, they exited the playoffs in the first round in a 31–37 loss to the Oakland Raiders. Mitchell was named to the 1977 All-Pro Second-Team and earned his third Pro Bowl selection.

==== Contract dispute and trade ====
Mitchell did not report to the Colts training camp in July 1978, choosing to holdout as part of a contract negotiation with Colts' general manager Dick Szymanski and owner Robert Irsay. Mitchell was fined $500 per day as he continued his holdout into August of that year. Mitchell and his agent were reportedly demanding an increase of his $100,000 per season salary to $200,000 per season, while the Colts countered that Mitchell should play the 1978 season under an option contract that increased his salary by 10 percent. Mitchell and his attorney filed a grievance with the NFL, claiming that Irsay was racially discriminating against Mitchell and bargaining in bad faith.

Mitchell's holdout eventually ended when he demanded a trade. The Colts granted his request, trading him to the San Diego Chargers on August 23, 1978, for running back Joe Washington and a 1979 fifth-round draft selection (this became the 131st overall pick–traded to the Detroit Lions for Greg Landry).

When he left the Colts, Mitchell was the franchise's career leading rusher with 5,487 yards, passing Lenny Moore (whose career rushing record he had also broken at Penn State). As of the 2025 NFL season, Mitchell is ranked third in Colts career rushing yards behind Edgerrin James and Jonathan Taylor.

=== San Diego Chargers (1978-1979) ===
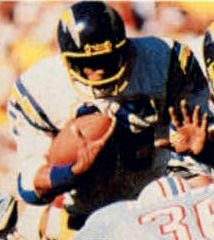
Michell with the Chargers in 1979.

Mitchell joined the Dan Fouts-led Chargers as their starting running back in the 1978 season. He led the Chargers in rushing that year, with 214 carries for 820 yards and three touchdowns. Mitchell also recorded his fifth straight 500-yard receiving season, with 57 catches for 500 yards and two touchdowns. Mitchell had a slow start to the season before turning in his best performance in week seven against the Miami Dolphins, where he accounted for all Chargers scoring. He had 19 carries for 77 yards and two rushing touchdowns and 6 receptions for 64 yards and one receiving touchdown, although the Chargers still lost the contest 21–28. The next week against the Detroit Lions, Mitchell caught a 55-yard touchdown pass from Fouts and added 53 yards rushing on nine carries.

Mitchell broke 100 yards rushing for the first time as a Charger in week 10 of the 1978 season against the Cincinnati Bengals, when he recorded 28 carries for 101 yards, following up the next week with a 29 carry, 144 yard performance against the Kansas City Chiefs. After starting the season at 1–3, the Chargers fired head coach Tommy Prothro and replaced him with Don Coryell. Coryell led the team to an 8-4 finish, with an overall record of 9–7 on the season.

Following the 1978 season, Mitchell suffered a staph infection in his knee, which sidelined him throughout the 1979 offseason and required surgery. Mitchell missed time early in the season while he continued to recover. Upon returning, Mitchell split time with running back Clarence Williams. Williams' rise, coupled with Coryell's vaunted passing offense, led to limited production from Mitchell throughout the 1979 season. He finished the season with 53 carries for 211 yards and 19 receptions for 159 yards and one receiving touchdown. Meanwhile, Fouts had the best season of his career to-date, leading the league in passing yards (4,082) and earning All-Pro and Pro Bowl selections. The Chargers ended the regular season at 12–4, winning the AFC West Division. They lost to the Houston Oilers, 14–17, in the Divisional Round of the 1979-80 NFL playoffs. Mitchell had 33 rushing yards and one touchdown in the game.

The Chargers released Mitchell on August 26, 1980, as part of the final round of roster cuts in the lead-up to the 1980 NFL season.

=== Los Angeles Rams (1980) ===
Mitchell was signed by the Los Angeles Rams on December 11, 1980, to replace Elvis Peacock. Peacock was the Rams' leading rusher before suffering a knee injury that sidelined him for the rest of the season.

Mitchell appeared in the Rams' final two games of the 1980 season, recording seven carries for 16 yards and two receptions for 21 yards. The Rams earned a spot in the playoffs, losing in the Wildcard Round to the Dallas Cowboys.

Mitchell became a free agent after the season, effectively ending his NFL career. Upon retiring, Mitchell was then-ranked 11th on the NFL's all-time rushing yards list. He finished his career with 18 100-yard rushing games and three 1,000 yard rushing seasons.

== Career statistics ==
=== NFL ===
Legend
| | Led the league |
| **Bold** | Career high |

| Year | Team | Games | | Rushing | | | | | | Receiving | | | | | Fumbles | |
| Year | Team | GP | GS | Att | Yds | Avg | Y/G | Lng | TD | Rec | Yds | Avg | Lng | TD | Fum | FR |
|---|---|---|---|---|---|---|---|---|---|---|---|---|---|---|---|---|
| 1972 | BAL | 11 | 1 | 45 | 215 | **4.8** | 19.5 | 14 | 1 | 18 | 147 | 8.2 | 26 | 1 | 3 | **1** |
| 1973 | BAL | 14 | 11 | 253 | 963 | 3.8 | 68.8 | 36 | 2 | 17 | 113 | 6.6 | 14 | 0 | 2 | 0 |
| 1974 | BAL | 14 | 14 | 214 | 757 | 3.5 | 54.1 | 31 | 5 | **72** | 544 | 7.6 | 24 | 2 | **6** | **1** |
| 1975 | BAL | 14 | 14 | 289 | 1,193 | 4.1 | 85.2 | **70** | **11** | 60 | 544 | 9.1 | 35 | **4** | 5 | 0 |
| 1976 | BAL | 14 | 14 | 289 | **1,200** | 4.2 | **85.7** | 43 | 5 | 60 | 555 | 9.3 | 40 | 3 | 4 | 0 |
| 1977 | BAL | 14 | 14 | **301** | 1,159 | 3.9 | 82.8 | 64 | 3 | 71 | **620** | 8.7 | 38 | **4** | 5 | **1** |
| 1978 | SDG | **16** | 11 | 214 | 820 | 3.8 | 51.3 | 25 | 3 | 57 | 500 | 8.8 | **55** | 2 | 2 | **1** |
| 1979 | SDG | 12 | 5 | 63 | 211 | 3.3 | 17.6 | 15 | 0 | 19 | 159 | 8.4 | 24 | 1 | 2 | 0 |
| 1980 | LAR | 2 | 0 | 7 | 16 | 2.3 | 8.0 | 5 | 0 | 2 | 21 | **10.5** | 13 | 0 | 0 | 0 |
| Career | | 111 | 84 | 1,675 | 6,534 | 3.9 | 58.9 | 70 | 30 | 376 | 3,203 | 8.5 | 55 | 17 | 29 | 4 |

=== College ===
| Season | Team | Games | Rushing | | | | Receiving | | | |
| Season | Team | GP | Att | Yds | Avg | TD | Rec | Yds | Avg | TD |
|---|---|---|---|---|---|---|---|---|---|---|
| 1969 | Penn State | 10 | 113 | 616 | 5.5 | 6 | 13 | **206** | **15.8** | 0 |
| 1970 | Penn State | 10 | 134 | 751 | 5.6 | 6 | 9 | 110 | 12.2 | 0 |
| 1971 | Penn State | **11** | **254** | **1,567** | **6.2** | **26** | **16** | 154 | 9.6 | **3** |
| Career | | 31 | 501 | 2,934 | 5.9 | 38 | 38 | 470 | 12.4 | 3 |

== Personal life ==
Mitchell earned a Bachelor of Science in secondary education from Penn State University in 1972. Upon retiring from the NFL, he returned to Baltimore, Maryland with his wife and three children. Mitchell and former Pittsburgh Steelers great Franco Harris, his friend and former Penn State teammate, started Super Bakery, a company that produces nutrition-oriented foods for schoolchildren. He and Harris also partnered to rescue the Parks Sausage Company in Baltimore, the first black American owned business in the U.S. to go public.

Mitchell is active in lecturing students on the dangers of drug and alcohol abuse. Mitchell is a member of the Omega Psi Phi fraternity.

== See also ==
- List of NCAA major college football yearly scoring leaders
- Penn State Nittany Lions football statistical leaders
- List of Indianapolis Colts career rushing leaders
