= Jerome Boyd =

American gridiron football player (born 1986)

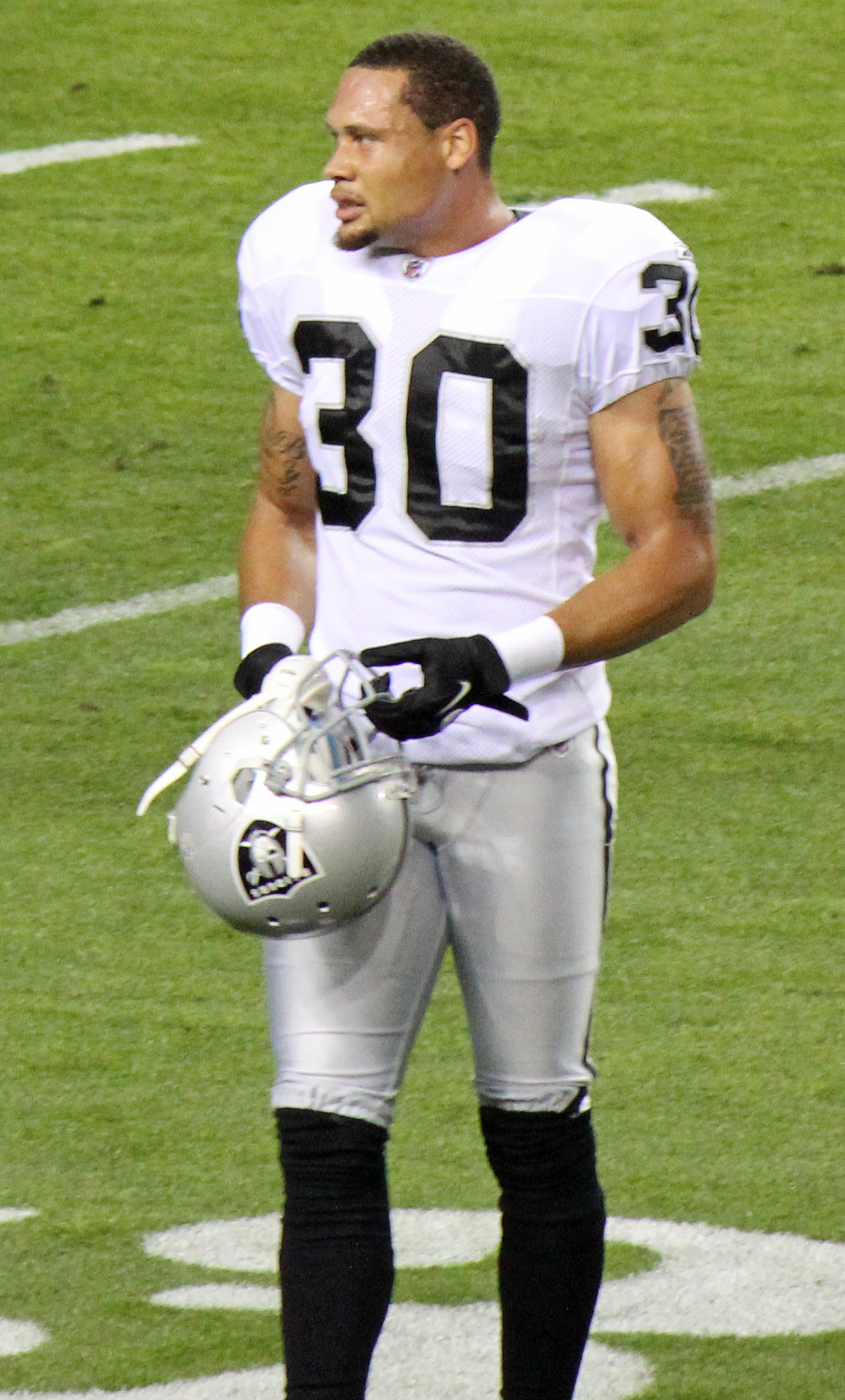
- Boyd in Denver in September, 2011

No. 30, 40
- Position: Safety

Personal information
- Born: May 26, 1986 (age 40); Los Angeles, California, U.S.
- Listed height: 6 ft 2 in (1.88 m)
- Listed weight: 225 lb (102 kg)

Career information
- High school: Susan Miller Dorsey (Los Angeles, California)
- College: Oregon
- NFL draft: 2009: undrafted

Career history
- Oakland Raiders (2009); Oakland Raiders (2011); Toronto Argonauts (2012)*
- * Offseason or practice squad member only

Career NFL statistics
- Total tackles: 28
- Pass deflections: 3
- Stats at Pro Football Reference

Jerome Anthony Boyd Jr (born May 26, 1986) is an American former professional football player who was a safety in the National Football League (NFL).

Boyd was born in Los Angeles, California and attended Hueneme High School (Oxnard, CA) before transferring to Dorsey High School (Los Angeles). He played college football at Oregon.

He is the son of former Seattle Seahawks linebacker Jerome Boyd.

== Professional career ==
=== Oakland Raiders ===
Boyd was signed by the Oakland Raiders as an undrafted free agent following the 2009 NFL draft on April 29. He was waived on September 5 and re-signed to the practice squad on September 6. He was promoted to the active roster on December 30. He was waived on September 4, 2010. He was re-signed on March 2, 2011. He was released in October 2011 by the Oakland Raiders to make room for Chinedum Ndukwe. He was promoted to the active roster again on November 10, 2011, after the Raiders waived Chinedum Ndukwe.

=== Toronto Argonauts ===
On October 16, 2012, Boyd was signed by the Toronto Argonauts of the Canadian Football League. He was released by the Argonauts on November 10, 2012.
