= Jerome Boyd (linebacker, born 1961) =

American football player (1961–2017)

No. 60
- Position: Linebacker

Personal information
- Born: September 18, 1961; Los Angeles, California, U.S.
- Died: April 28, 2017 (aged 55); Los Angeles, California, U.S.
- Listed height: 6 ft 2 in (1.88 m)
- Listed weight: 225 lb (102 kg)

Career information
- High school: Crenshaw (Los Angeles)
- College: Santa Monica (1979–1980); Oregon State (1981–1982)
- NFL draft: 1983: undrafted

Career history
- Seattle Seahawks (1983); Oakland Invaders (1984)
- Stats at Pro Football Reference

Jerome Anthony Boyd (September 18, 1961 – April 28, 2017) was an American professional football player who was a linebacker for the Seattle Seahawks of the National Football League (NFL). He played college football at Santa Monica College and Oregon State University. He also played for the Oakland Invaders of the United States Football League (USFL).

== Early life and college ==
Jerome Anthony Boyd was born on September 18, 1961, in Los Angeles, California. He played high school football at Crenshaw High School in Los Angeles.

Boyd played college football at Santa Monica College from 1979 to 1980. He was then a two-year letterman for the Oregon State Beavers of Oregon State University from 1981 to 1982. He recorded one interception as a senior in 1982.

== Professional career ==
After going undrafted in the 1983 NFL draft, Boyd signed with the Seattle Seahawks on May 14, 1983. He was released on August 23, 1983. He re-signed with the Seahawks on October 5, 1983, after Joe Norman suffered an injury. Boyd played in five games during the 1983 season. He re-signed with the Seahawks in 1984 but was later released on August 28, 1984.

Boyd played in one game for the Oakland Invaders of the United States Football League in 1984.

== Personal life ==
Boyd was the father of former Oakland Raiders safety Jerome Boyd.

Following football, Boyd went on to a distinguished 30-year career with the Los Angeles Fire Department, rising to the rank of battalion chief.

Chief Boyd died April 28, 2017, after suffering a medical emergency while on duty. He was buried with full LAFD honors.
