= Straitway Truth Ministries =

Black Hebrew Israelite denomination

- Abbreviation: STM
- Type: Hebrew Israelites
- Orientation: African American religion
- Theology: Biblical literalism
- Structure: Communal living
- Head Pastor: Charles Dowell Jr.
- Region: United States
- Headquarters: Macon County, Tennessee
- Chapters: 12
- Other names: Straitway Truth Ministry, Straitway Ministries, Straitway
- Official website: https://straitway.com/
- Legacy website: https://straitwaytruth.com/

Straitway Truth Ministries, also known as Straitway Truth Ministry, Straitway Ministries, and Straitway, is a Hebrew Israelite organization based near Lafayette, Tennessee that preaches biblical literalism. Led by Charles Dowell Jr., Straitway describes itself as "a nation of Hebrew Israelites who are commandment keepers; obedient to Yah (God) & our savior, Jesus the Christ."

Straitway operates around a dozen chapters around the United States and encourages members to live together in isolated communities. The group has been accused of being a cult and has faced allegations of abuse and financial exploitation.

Straitway counts several former professional American football players, including former National Football League Pro Bowl selections Daniel Muir, Kabeer Gbaja-Biamila and Robert Mathis, as members.
