= Robert Mathis =

American football player and coach (born 1981)

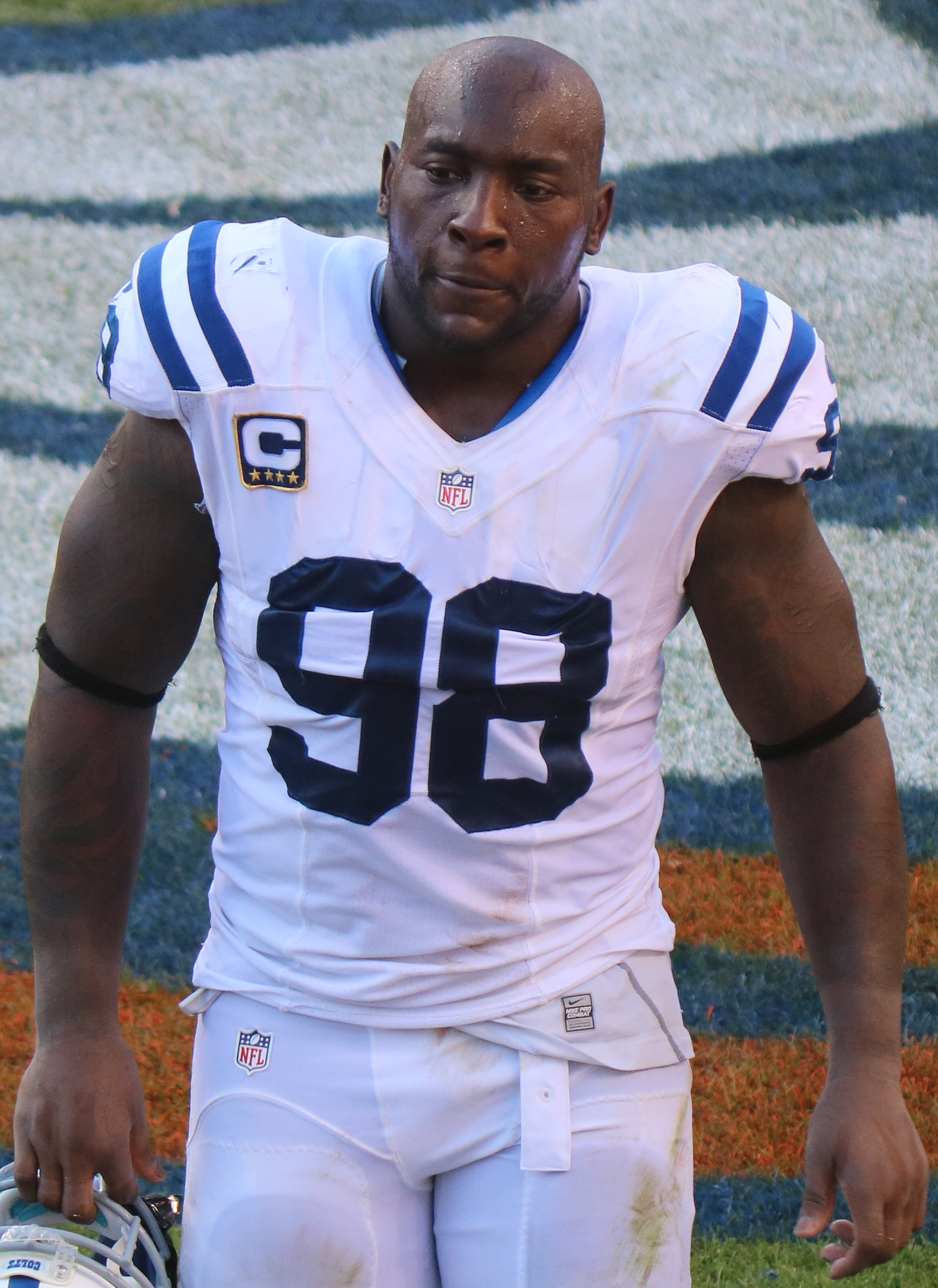
- Mathis with the Indianapolis Colts in 2016

No. 98
- Positions: Defensive end, linebacker

Personal information
- Born: February 26, 1981 (age 45); Atlanta, Georgia, U.S.
- Listed height: 6 ft 2 in (1.88 m)
- Listed weight: 245 lb (111 kg)

Career information
- High school: McNair (Atlanta)
- College: Alabama A&M (1999–2002)
- NFL draft: 2003: 5th round, 138th overall pick

Career history

Playing
- Indianapolis Colts (2003–2016)

Coaching
- Indianapolis Colts (2017–2019) Pass rush consultant & player development

Awards and highlights
- Super Bowl champion (XLI); First-team All-Pro (2013); 5× Pro Bowl (2008–2010, 2012, 2013); Deacon Jones Award (2013); 3× NFL forced fumbles leader (2004, 2005, 2013); Indianapolis Colts Ring of Honor; Alabama A&M Bulldogs No. 55 retired; NFL record: Most career forced fumbles: 52

Career NFL statistics
- Total tackles: 538
- Sacks: 123.0
- Forced fumbles: 52
- Fumble recoveries: 17
- Safeties: 1
- Interceptions: 1
- Defensive touchdowns: 3
- Stats at Pro Football Reference

Robert Nathan Mathis (born February 26, 1981) is an American former professional football player who spent his entire 14-year career as a defensive end and linebacker with the Indianapolis Colts of the National Football League (NFL). He played college football for the Alabama A&M Bulldogs and was selected by the Colts in the fifth round of the 2003 NFL draft. A one-time All-Pro and a five-time Pro Bowler, Mathis won the Super Bowl XLI with the Colts in 2006 over the Chicago Bears. He is also the NFL's all-time leader in forced fumbles and strip sacks. The year after retiring, Mathis joined the Colts as an assistant defensive coach.

== Early life ==
Mathis was born in Atlanta, Georgia. He attended McNair High School in Atlanta. He was classmates with Gucci Mane.

== College career ==
Mathis enrolled in at Alabama A&M University, where he was a four-year starter for the Bulldogs. He set an NCAA I-AA record with 20 sacks during his senior season and established himself as one of the most dominant defensive players in NCAA I-AA history. In the summer of 2010, Mathis graduated with a degree in exercise science with a minor in physical education, and is a member of the Omega Psi Phi fraternity, Nu Epsilon chapter.

== Professional career ==
=== 2003–2005 ===
Mathis was selected by the Indianapolis Colts with the 138th selection in the 2003 NFL draft.

Mathis immediately stepped in during his rookie season as a pass rush specialist, playing in all 16 regular season games and recording 20 tackles, 3.5 sacks and 3 forced fumbles. During his second season, Mathis took another step forward as he increased his numbers to 36 tackles, 10.5 sacks and 6 forced fumbles, despite appearing only as a specialist and starting only 1 game. In Mathis's third season, he set a Colts franchise record with 8 consecutive games with at least 1 sack, and finished the season with 54 tackles, 11.5 sacks and 8 forced fumbles, despite missing three games due to injuries.

=== 2006–2011 ===
Following the 2005 season, Robert Mathis signed a 5-year extension with the Colts worth $30 million, making him one of the highest paid defensive ends in the league at the time. The following season, Mathis started every game for the first time in his career, recording a career-high 65 tackles along with 9.5 sacks and 6 forced fumbles. That year, Mathis helped the Colts go on to beat the Chicago Bears in Super Bowl XLI to become NFL champions. In 2007, Mathis recorded 32 tackles, 7 sacks and 4 forced fumbles in an injury shortened season.

In 2008, Mathis had his best statistical season to date, posting 48 tackles, 11.5 sacks and 5 forced fumbles. He was also voted to the 2009 Pro Bowl for the AFC behind then-teammate and perennial Pro-Bowler Dwight Freeney.

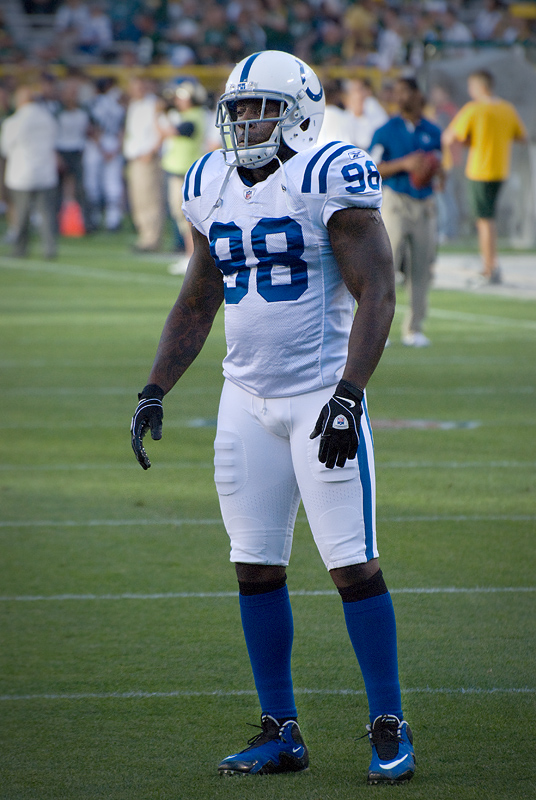
Mathis playing for the Colts in 2010

In November 2009, Mathis won his first career AFC Defensive Player of the Month award, and finished the season with 37 tackles, 9.5 sacks, and 5 forced fumbles. He would win his second such award for his defensive performance in September 2010, and would finish 2010 with 60 tackles, 11 sacks, and 1 forced fumble. He was ranked 44th by his fellow players on the NFL Top 100 Players of 2011.

Mathis recorded 9.5 sacks during the 2011 regular season, along with 43 tackles and 3 forced fumbles. It was the seventh season in his 9-year NFL career that he had at least 9.5 sacks. On January 2, 2012, Mathis was added to the AFC Pro Bowl roster to replace Patriots defensive end Andre Carter. On January 23, 2012, Mathis decided not to play in Pro Bowl. Mathis recorded 33 tackles, 8 sacks, and 1 forced fumble in 12 games during the 2012 season.

=== 2012–2016 ===
On March 5, 2012, Mathis signed a one-year tender worth $10.6 million. He then signed a four-year $36 million contract on the same day. Mathis began playing strong-side outside linebacker under new Colts head coach Chuck Pagano during the 2012 season. He recorded his first interception against Detroit Lions quarterback Matthew Stafford in a 35–33 win during week 13.

In week 5 of the 2013 season against the Seattle Seahawks, Mathis recorded the 100th sack of his career. He became the 30th player in league history to accomplish the feat. He was named the AFC Defensive Player of the Month for October, the third time he has won the award.

On November 24, 2013, during a game against the Cardinals, Mathis recorded his 40th career strip sack, breaking the previous record held by Jason Taylor.

In a Week 15 matchup with the Houston Texans on December 15, 2013, Mathis sacked quarterback Case Keenum giving him the Colts' single-season record of 16.5 sacks and the franchise record of 108.0 career sacks, breaking marks previously held by Dwight Freeney, his former teammate. It was also his 42nd strip sack of his career, adding to his NFL record of career sack forced fumbles.

Mathis would lead the NFL in sacks with 19.5, a half sack more than Robert Quinn of the St. Louis Rams. He was awarded the inaugural Deacon Jones award for leading the NFL in sacks, and also won his second AFC Defensive Player of the Month award of the 2013 season for his performance in December. He finished second in the Defensive Player of the Year voting behind Luke Kuechly of the Carolina Panthers.

On May 16, 2014, it was announced that Mathis would serve a 4-game suspension for violating the leagues' drug policy. Mathis issued a statement later that day claiming that his violation of the league's performance-enhancing drug policy was due to taking unapproved fertility drugs to conceive a child.

On September 8, 2014, it was reported that Mathis had torn his Achilles tendon while working out on his own, sidelining him for the season. The Colts signed Mathis to a one-year extension on September 30, 2014.

During the 2015 season, Mathis won the AFC Defensive Player of the Week award for Week 16 after totalling two sacks against the Dolphins, including one to end the game. Coincidentally, former teammate Dwight Freeney won the award for the NFC for the same week.

On December 30, 2016, Mathis announced that he would retire following the Colts Week 17 game against the Jacksonville Jaguars. In the game Mathis recorded three tackles and a strip sack, which was the 123rd sack of his career. He passed former teammate Dwight Freeney (122.5) for 17th most sacks in NFL history, and extended his own record for most career strip sacks (47). For his efforts in the game, he was named the AFC Defensive Player of the Week.

== NFL career statistics ==
Legend
	Won the Super Bowl
	NFL record
	Led the league
**Bold**	Career high

=== Regular season ===
Year	Team	Games		Tackles				Interceptions						Fumbles			
Year	Team	GP	GS	Cmb	Solo	Ast	Sck	PD	Int	Yds	Avg	Lng	TD	FF	FR	Yds	TD
2003	IND	16	0	25	21	4	3.5	2	0	0	0.0	0	0	3	1	0	0
2004	IND	16	1	36	32	4	10.5	0	0	0	0.0	0	0	6	**3**	26	0
2005	IND	13	0	56	45	11	11.5	2	0	0	0.0	0	0	**8**	0	0	0
2006	IND	16	16	**65**	**50**	15	9.5	**4**	0	0	0.0	0	0	4	2	0	0
2007	IND	13	12	37	31	6	7.0	0	0	0	0.0	0	0	4	1	0	0
2008	IND	15	2	47	36	11	11.5	3	0	0	0.0	0	0	5	**3**	**37**	**1**
2009	IND	14	9	37	24	13	9.5	2	0	0	0.0	0	0	5	0	0	0
2010	IND	16	16	60	44	**16**	11.0	1	0	0	0.0	0	0	1	1	1	0
2011	IND	16	15	43	29	14	9.5	1	0	0	0.0	0	0	3	**3**	0	0
2012	IND	12	12	33	22	11	8.0	1	**1**	**1**	**1.0**	**1**	0	1	0	0	0
2013	IND	16	16	59	44	15	**19.5**	1	0	0	0.0	0	0	**8**	0	0	0
2014	IND	0	0	Did not play due to injury													
2015	IND	15	10	20	15	5	7.0	0	0	0	0.0	0	0	1	1	0	**1**
2016	IND	14	12	20	15	5	5.0	0	0	0	0.0	0	0	3	2	14	**1**
Career		192	121	538	408	130	123.0	18	1	1	1.0	1	0	52	17	78	3

=== Postseason ===
Year	Team	Games		Tackles				Interceptions						Fumbles			
Year	Team	GP	GS	Cmb	Solo	Ast	Sck	PD	Int	Yds	Avg	Lng	TD	FF	FR	Yds	TD
2003	IND	3	0	5	4	1	–	**1**	–	–	–	–	–	–	–	–	–
2004	IND	1	0	4	3	1	–	–	–	–	–	–	–	–	–	–	–
2005	IND	1	0	2	2	0	–	**1**	–	–	–	–	–	–	–	–	–
2006	IND	4	4	**20**	**14**	**6**	1.5	–	–	–	–	–	–	**3**	**1**	0	0
2007	IND	1	0	–	–	–	–	–	–	–	–	–	–	–	–	–	–
2008	IND	1	0	4	3	1	**2.0**	–	–	–	–	–	–	–	–	–	–
2009	IND	3	3	8	5	3	–	–	–	–	–	–	–	–	–	–	–
2010	IND	1	1	2	2	0	–	–	–	–	–	–	–	–	–	–	–
2012	IND	1	1	5	3	2	1.0	–	–	–	–	–	–	–	–	–	–
2013	IND	2	2	5	3	2	**2.0**	–	–	–	–	–	–	2	0	0	0
2014	IND	0	0	Did not play due to injury													
Career		18	11	55	39	16	6.5	2	–	–	–	–	–	5	1	0	0

== Personal life ==
Mathis appeared as himself in the episode "Fluoride" of the comedy television series Parks and Recreation, alongside teammates Andrew Luck, Reggie Wayne, Adam Vinatieri, Anthony Castonzo, and Colts owner Jim Irsay.

In 2017, Mathis joined the Colts coaching staff as a Pass Rush Consultant.

In 2020, Mathis started the Gridiron Gang, a football team based in Indianapolis that travels the country.

Mathis is a member of Straitway Truth Ministry, a Black Hebrew Israelite group that preaches Biblical literalism. He joined the group after he was introduced by former Colts teammate Daniel Muir.
