= Don Goodman (American football) =

American football player (born 1957)

No. 37, 40
- Position: Running back

Personal information
- Born: April 23, 1957 (age 69); Los Angeles, California, U.S.
- Listed height: 5 ft 11 in (1.80 m)
- Listed weight: 214 lb (97 kg)

Career information
- High school: Crenshaw (Los Angeles)
- College: Cincinnati
- NFL draft: 1984: undrafted

Career history
- Washington Redskins (1984)*; New York Giants (1985)*; St. Louis Cardinals (1987)
- * Offseason or practice squad member only
- Stats at Pro Football Reference

Weldon Charles Goodman (born April 23, 1957) is an American former professional football player who was a running back for the St. Louis Cardinals of the National Football League (NFL). He played college football for the Cincinnati Bearcats.

Goodman led the Bearcats in 1983 in receptions with 51. He also scored the second and final TD in the Bearcats' win against defending national champion Penn State. Prior to entering the NFL, he was a member of the United States Marine Corps.
