= Airabin Justin =

American gridiron football player (born 1981)

No. 24
- Position: Defensive back

Personal information
- Born: March 25, 1981 (age 45); Inglewood, California, U.S.
- Listed height: 5 ft 11 in (1.80 m)
- Listed weight: 185 lb (84 kg)

Career information
- College: Northern Arizona
- NFL draft: 2003: undrafted

Career history
- 2003: Baltimore Ravens*
- 2004–2006: Hamilton Tiger-Cats
- 2007: Saskatchewan Roughriders
- 2008: Edmonton Eskimos*
- * Offseason or practice squad member only

Awards and highlights
- Grey Cup champion (2007)
- Stats at CFL.ca

Airabin Justin (born March 25, 1981) is an American former professional football defensive back. He was signed as an undrafted free agent by the Baltimore Ravens in 2003. He played college football for the University of Utah and Northern Arizona Lumberjacks.

Justin eas also a member of the Hamilton Tiger-Cats, Saskatchewan Roughriders and Edmonton Eskimos of the Canadian Football League (CFL).

== Personal life ==
Justin is the son of gridiron defensive back Sid Justin. He is also the nephew of USFL defensive back Tyrone Justin and NFL/USFL defensive back Kerry Justin.
