= Crenshaw High School =

Coordinates: 33°59′49″N 118°19′44″W

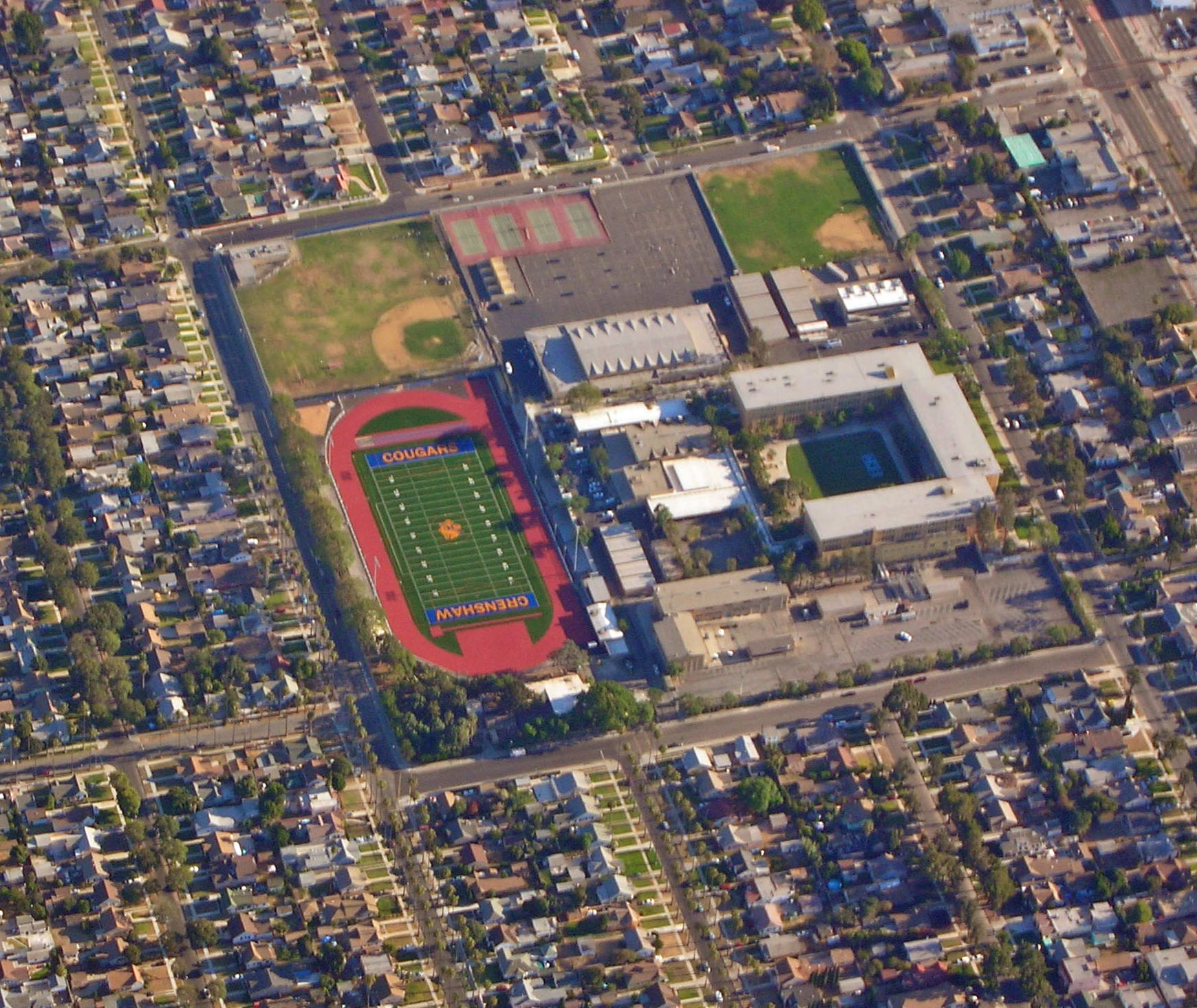

Location
- 5010 11th Avenue; Los Angeles, California 90043; United States

Information
- School type: Public
- Motto: Every Cougar. College Bound!
- Established: January 28, 1968; 58 years ago
- School district: Los Angeles Unified School District
- Dean: Michael Roux
- Principal: Terrence Mudd
- Teaching staff: 31.26 (FTE)
- Grades: 9–12
- Enrollment: 534 (2023–2024)
- Student to teacher ratio: 17.08
- Campus: Urban
- Colors: Blue, Gold, Black
- Athletics: Football, Baseball, Boys Basketball, Girls Basketball, Boys Golf, Girls Golf, Boys Soccer, Boys Tennis, Girls Tennis, Girls Volleyball, Track and Field, Girls Flag Football
- Athletics conference: Coliseum League; CIF Los Angeles City Section
- Mascot: Cougar
- Yearbook: The Cougar's Path
- Information: BSAP School
- Website: https://www.crenshawhs.org/

Crenshaw High School is a four-year public secondary school in the Los Angeles Unified School District, located on 11th Avenue in the Hyde Park neighborhood of Los Angeles, California. The school's colors are blue and gold, and the mascot is a cougar.

The school first opened in 1968 and currently enrolls around 750 students.

== History and background ==
Crenshaw High School opened in January 1968. The school drew students from several neighborhoods, including Baldwin Hills, Leimert Park, Crenshaw, as well as a few other neighborhoods. The school's student body began with students from wealthier communities. Most of the students who attended Crenshaw High lived in or near this neighborhood of Los Angeles. The total school enrollment at Crenshaw high school, as of the spring of 2020 is less than 700 students.

Several areas, including the wealthy unincorporated Los Angeles County community of View Park-Windsor Hills are zoned to Crenshaw; some sections of View Park-Windsor Hills are jointly zoned to Crenshaw and Westchester High School. On August 15, 2005, Crenshaw High School lost its accreditation due to administrative fraud. The accreditation was restored on February 1, 2006.

=== Principals ===
The first principal of Crenshaw High School was Robert Case, who opened the high school in January 1968. Former Los Angeles Unified School District Superintendent Sidney A. Thompson was the school's second principal. Jewell Boutte was principal in 1988 when she was awarded the prestigious Milken Educator Award for innovations she brought to the school.

Carrie Allen, formerly an administrator for the Pasadena Unified School District in Pasadena, California became principal in 2009. Allen was replaced in summer 2011 by Sylvia Rousseau. Rousseau was formerly the principal at Santa Monica High School and the superintendent of a local district in LAUSD. She has also served on the faculty at USC's Rossier School of Education. In 2013 L. R. Corley became principal and served as principal until June 2018. Peter Benefiel became the new principal in 2018 and served until June 2021. In June of 2021, Donald Moorer became the new principal of Crenshaw High School. In September 2024, Donald Moorer stepped down as principal and Terrence Mudd became the new principal of Crenshaw High.

== Sports ==
Crenshaw High School competes in the CIF Los Angeles City Section.

The Boys Varsity Basketball team has won numerous L.A. City and California State basketball titles. Crenshaw also won the International High School Basketball Tournament in Ahus, Skåne County, Sweden in the 1985 basketball season, highlighted by high scoring games with the team scoring 191 points vs. Ireland's high school basketball team and Crenshaw scoring 197 points vs. Cyprus High School of Magna, Utah. Throughout the school history, the Crenshaw's boys basketball team has participated in The Les Schwab Invitational, a national tournament played in the state of Oregon along with tournaments throughout the United States, including the state of Alaska.

Crenshaw has won six State titles in football:
1992 AAA champs
2005 Div 1 champs
2009 Div 1 champs
2010 Div 1 champs
2013 Div 1 champs
2017 State champs
2022 Div 3 champs

In 2004, film star Kirk Douglas and the Amateur Athletic Foundation (AAF) donated stadium lights for the school's football stadium. The Crenshaw High School Varsity Football team won its first "Championship Division" Los Angeles City championship in 2005, defeating Woodland Hills Taft High School. A "AAA" Championship was won in 1992, defeating Chatsworth High School.

The football team has appeared in multiple CIF state championship bowl games, including 2009 and 2017, winning the state title in 2017.

== Notable alumni ==
- Albert Bell - former NFL wide receiver
- Jerome Boyd - former NFL linebacker
- V. Bozeman - singer and actress
- Chris Brown - Major League Baseball All-Star third baseman with San Francisco Giants
- Darrell Brown (baseball) - Major League Baseball outfielder
- Stanley Brundy (born 1967) - basketball player
- James T. Butts, Jr. - Inglewood mayor, was first black and youngest Santa Monica Police Department police chief
- Darwin Cook - basketball player, selected by Detroit Pistons in 1980 NBA draft; played with New Jersey Nets, Washington Bullets, Denver Nuggets and San Antonio Spurs
- James Davis - former NFL cornerback
- Charles DeJurnett - former NFL defensive tackle for the Los Angeles Rams
- Greg Ducre - NFL cornerback
- D-Roc the Executioner - guitarist
- Larry Elder - radio personality
- Solomon Elimimian - gridiron football player
- Ernie C - guitarist
- Duane Galloway - former NFL cornerback
- Akbar Gbaja-Biamila - NFL player, broadcaster for CBS College Sports Network, co-hosts American Ninja Warrior
- Kabeer Gbaja-Biamila - Green Bay Packers football player, Packers record holder for all-time sacks
- Don Goodman - NFL running back
- Johnny Gray - American record holder in 800 meters, 1992 Olympic bronze medalist; 4-time Olympian; 1987, 1999 Pan Am Games champion; 7-time U.S. Outdoor national champion; 3-time Olympic Trials champion
- Ajene Harris - professional football cornerback
- Dominique Hatfield - American football cornerback for the Los Angeles Rams
- Daiyan Henley - NFL linebacker for the Los Angeles Chargers
- Dante Hughes - former NFL cornerback
- Ice-T - musician, recording artist, actor for NBC's Law & Order: Special Victims Unit
- Kris Johnson - professional basketball player, son of Marques Johnson
- Marques Johnson - Fox Sports analyst, former UCLA and NBA player, 1975 NCAA champion, actor in White Men Can't Jump
- Kerry Justin - former NFL cornerback
- Sid Justin - singer, songwriter, former NFL defensive back
- Left Brain (Vyron Turner) - musician, Odd Future
- Charles Lockett - NFL player
- Jim Looney - linebacker for NFL's San Francisco 49ers
- Mike G (Michael Anthony Griffin II) - rapper and DJ, Odd Future
- Willie Mack - Professional wrestler
- Brandon Mebane - defensive tackle, Seattle Seahawks and Los Angeles Chargers
- Kevin Ollie - basketball head coach of University of Connecticut, winner of 2014 NCAA National Championship; former UConn and NBA player
- Brian Price - UCLA football player, Pac-10 Pat Tillman defensive player of the year, 2009
- Hayes Pullard III - linebacker for NFL's Los Angeles Chargers
- Trayvon Robinson - Major League Baseball player, Baltimore Orioles and Los Angeles Dodgers organization
- Robin Russell - drummer, member of New Birth/Nite-Liters (band)
- Schoolboy Q - musician, member of Top Dawg Entertainment
- Pamela L. Spratlen - U.S. diplomat; ambassador to Kyrgyzstan (2011–2014) and Uzbekistan (2015–2018)
- Misty Stone - pornographic actress and model
- Darryl Strawberry - first overall pick in 1980 Major League Baseball draft by New York Mets, named National League Rookie of the Year in 1983; 8-time All-Star who was part of teams winning three World Series; hit 335 home runs with Mets, Los Angeles Dodgers, San Francisco Giants and New York Yankees
- De'Anthony Thomas - wide receiver and kick returner for Baltimore Ravens and Kansas City Chiefs
- Stephen Thompson - assistant coach for Oregon State University, player for Syracuse
- Thundercat - American bass guitarist, singer, and songwriter from Los Angeles
- Wendell Tyler - football player for UCLA, Los Angeles Rams and San Francisco 49ers; played in two Super Bowls
- Ellis Valentine - Major League Baseball right fielder remembered for having one of game's all-time great throwing arms; first professional athlete signed out of Crenshaw when Montreal Expos selected him in 1972 Major League Baseball draft
- Donald Vega - Nicaraguan-born jazz pianist
- John Williams - LSU and NBA basketball player
- Marcus Williams - NBA player for New Jersey Nets, Memphis Grizzlies
- Michael Williams - football player
- Victor Ray Wilson - drummer
- Eric Yarber - wide receivers coach for Los Angeles Rams

== Film locations ==
Crenshaw was featured in the UPN family television series Moesha starring Brandy Norwood and Countess Vaughn. It also used its gym for the 2006 film Bring It On: All or Nothing starring Hayden Panettiere and Solange Knowles and Love and Basketball starring Sanaa Lathan and Omar Epps. In 2001, the book And Still We Rise, written by Miles Corwin, chronicled the lives of twelve seniors in the Crenshaw High Gifted & Talented Magnet program in their quest to obtain an education—amidst formidable obstacles. It was also featured in the 2018 film A Wrinkle in Time.

== See also ==
- CIF Southern Section
- Food from the 'Hood
