= Bill Brooks (wide receiver) =

American football player (born 1964)

No. 80
- Position: Wide receiver

Personal information
- Born: April 6, 1964 (age 62); Boston, Massachusetts, U.S.
- Listed height: 6 ft 0 in (1.83 m)
- Listed weight: 193 lb (88 kg)

Career information
- High school: Framingham North (MA)
- College: Boston University (1982-1985)
- NFL draft: 1986: 4th round, 86th overall pick

Career history
- Indianapolis Colts (1986–1992); Buffalo Bills (1993–1995); Washington Redskins (1996)

Awards and highlights
- Byron "Whizzer" White NFL Man of the Year Award (1996); PFWA All-Rookie Team (1986); Indianapolis Colts Ring of Honor (1998); Boston University Athletic Hall of Fame (1991)

Career NFL statistics
- Games played: 169
- Receptions: 583
- Receiving yards: 8,001
- Receiving touchdowns: 46
- Stats at Pro Football Reference

William T. Brooks Jr. (born April 6, 1964) is an American former professional football player who was a wide receiver for 11 seasons in the National Football League (NFL). Brooks was selected by the Indianapolis Colts in the fourth round of the 1986 NFL draft. He played in the NFL from 1986 to 1996 for the Colts, Buffalo Bills, and Washington Redskins. Brooks played college football for Boston University.

== Early life ==
Bill Brooks was born on April 6, 1964, in Boston, Massachusetts and raised in nearby Framingham, Massachusetts. Brooks attended Framingham North High School where he was a two-sport star athlete in football and basketball.

On the football team, Brooks played both offense and defense. In 1980 as a junior, Brooks was named to the Bay State League All-Star team as a defensive back. In his senior season, Brooks continued to shine for Framingham. The Boston Globe named Brooks a Star of the Week in a 21-13 win over Braintree High School. Brooks had five receptions for 175 yards and two touchdowns and recorded four interceptions on defense. Brooks was selected to play in the Massachusetts Shriners All-Star game, representing the South team. Brooks set a then-Shriners game record with 150 receiving yards and one touchdown.

== College career ==
Brooks played for Division I-AA Boston University (BU) from 1982 to 1985. Brooks saw varsity playing time as a freshman and in BU's first game of the season against New Hampshire, Brooks had two receptions for 23 yards and caught his first collegiate touchdown. Brooks led BU with 30 receptions and placed second on the team in receiving yards. He was named the Yankee Conference Rookie of the Year and Second-Team All-Yankee Conference. That year, BU were Yankee Conference co-champions with Maine and faced Colgate in the first round of the 1982 NCAA Division I-AA Playoffs, losing 21-7.

As a sophomore, Brooks and running back Paul Lewis led the Terriers to a 9-4 record and a tie for #13 in the Division I-AA rankings. BU repeated as Yankee Conference co-champions, this time with UConn. BU won their first round matchup in the 1983 NCAA Division I-AA Playoffs, defeating Eastern Kentucky 24-20. In the second round game against Furman, Brooks recorded 12 receptions for 234 yards, but BU lost to the #3-ranked Paladins, 35-16. Brooks was named to the All-Yankee Conference First-Team at the end of the season. Brooks set a new BU school record with 39 receptions on the season.

In his junior season, Brooks again led the team in receiving while also becoming the first wide receiver to lead BU in scoring. BU played Grambling State in the opening game of the season as part of the Whitney Young Memorial Classic at Yankee Stadium. BU won the game 16-9 and Brooks recorded three receptions for 111 yards, including an 83-yard touchdown reception. The Terriers went 9-3 and earned their third straight Yankee Conference co-championship with Rhode Island. BU tied for the #4 ranking, and faced Richmond in the first round of the 1984 NCAA Division I-AA Playoffs, where they lost 33-35. Brooks was named to the All-Yankee Conference First-Team and All-New England Intercollegiate First-Team.

In Brooks' 1985 senior season, BU went 3-8 and missed the NCAA Division I-AA Playoffs for the first time in his career. Despite BU's poor record, Brooks had his most productive collegiate season. Brooks had 79 receptions for 1,210 yards and 11 touchdowns on the season. In his final collegiate game against Colgate, Brooks recorded 10 receptions for 236 yards and four touchdowns, setting a new BU single-game receiving touchdown record. Brooks earned his third All-Yankee Conference First-Team selection, second All-New England First-Team selection, the 1985 ECAC Division I-AA First-Team, and AP All-America Second-Team. Brooks also played in the 1986 Senior Bowl.

Brooks set several BU school records during his time in Boston, including most career receptions (228), career receiving yards (3,579), and career receiving touchdowns (32). Brooks was named to the Boston University Athletic Hall of Fame in 1991.

== Professional career ==
Brooks was drafted by the Indianapolis Colts in the fourth round with the 86th overall selection in the 1986 NFL draft.

=== Indianapolis Colts (1986–1992) ===
Brooks had an immediate impact for the Colts during his rookie season. He recorded his first NFL touchdown reception in week four against the New York Jets on a three-yard pass from fellow rookie quarterback Jack Trudeau. The next week against the San Francisco 49ers, Brooks recorded his longest career reception - an 84-yard touchdown from Trudeau. In a week 11 rematch against the Jets, Brooks recorded his first 100-yard receiving game with nine catches for 177 yards and one touchdown. The following week against the Houston Oilers, he turned in a seven catch, 105 yard performance that included two touchdowns. Brooks set Colts rookie records in all receiving categories, finishing the 1986 season with 65 receptions for 1,131 yards and eight touchdowns. The Colts started the season at 0-13, firing head coach Rod Dowhower and replacing him with Ron Meyer, who won the final three games of the season and brought the Colts to 3-13. Brooks was named to the 1986 PFWA All-Rookie Team.

In 1987, Brooks built on his rookie success. In week one against the Cincinnati Bengals, Brooks had six receptions for 146 yards and one touchdown. His touchdown reception came on a 52-yard play where Brooks leapt over two defenders before running into the end zone. Brooks finished the season with 51 receptions for 722 yards and three touchdowns. The Colts' play continued to improve under Meyer, with the addition of star running back Eric Dickerson providing a new offensive weapon. The Colts went 9-6 and won the AFC East Division during the strike-shortened season. The Colts made their first NFL playoff appearance since moving to Indianapolis, losing in the Divisional Round 21-38 to the Cleveland Browns.

The 1988 season saw a new quarterback for the Colts, with Chris Chandler being drafted in the third round. Chandler was thrust into the starting role as veteran Gary Hogeboom and Trudeau both suffered injuries. With Chandler at quarterback for the majority of the season, Brooks continued to show consistency. Brooks was injured in a preseason game against the Denver Broncos, but was able to recover before the start of the regular season. Brooks had 54 receptions for 867 yards and three touchdowns on the season. Brooks' best game of the season came in week seven against the Tampa Bay Buccaneers. Brooks caught seven receptions for 139 yards and one touchdown, as the Colts held on to a 35-31 victory. The Colts posted their second consecutive winning season, going 9-7 but finishing just outside of the playoffs at second place in the AFC East.

In 1989, Indianapolis drafted wide receiver Andre Rison in the first round. Coming into the season, Brooks held out of training camp in response to the much larger contract that the rookie Rison had received. Brooks negotiated a new three-year deal, and returned to the Colts in August. Rison and Brooks both played well throughout the 1989 season, but poor quarterback play limited their effectiveness. Chris Chandler started the first three games of the season before suffering an ACL tear, leaving Trudeau to take the reins. For the season, Brooks recorded 63 catches for 919 yards and four touchdowns. Rison added 52 catches for 820 yards and four touchdowns. Brooks had three 100-yard receiving games on the season. The Colts went 8-8 on the season, missing the playoffs.

Brooks took over again in 1990 as the Colts premier pass catcher. Prior to the 1990 NFL draft, Indianapolis traded Rison and lineman Chris Hinton to the Atlanta Falcons for their first round selection. The Colts used that pick to take Jeff George, who was seen as the new franchise quarterback. Brooks responded with another consistent season, recording 62 receptions for 823 yard and five touchdowns. The Colts went 7-9 on the season.

In 1991, the Colts started the season at 0-5, leading to head coach Ron Meyer being fired. Defensive coordinator Rick Venturi took over for the remainder of the season, but did not fare any better. The Colts won a single game on the season, finishing at 1-15. Brooks remained a consistent presence throughout the chaotic season. He made a career-high 72 catches for 888 yards and four touchdowns.

The 1992 season was Brooks' last in Indianapolis as a player. He missed the opening game of the season with a sprained ankle, snapping a streak of 88 consecutive starts. Under new head coach Ted Marchibroda, Brooks' playing time began to be limited. Receivers Jessie Hester and Reggie Langhorne took over as the primary pass catchers. Brooks still had a respectable season, and in 10 starts he recorded 44 receptions for 468 yards and one touchdown.

Brooks' contract with the Colts expired after the 1992 season, leaving him a free agent. Several teams pursued him, including Indianapolis, but Brooks signed with the Buffalo Bills in April 1993.

Brooks was the Colts' leading receiver for five of his seven seasons with the team. When he left the Colts, Brooks was ranked second all-time in receptions and fourth all-time in franchise receiving yards. As of the 2023 NFL season, Brooks is ranked seventh on the Colts all-time receiving yards list.

Brooks later became the first Indianapolis Colts player to be inducted into the Indianapolis Colts Ring of Honor on August 22, 1998.

=== Buffalo Bills (1993–1995) ===
Brooks joined a Bills team that had won three consecutive AFC Championships from 1990-1992. Brooks replaced retired starter James Lofton and quickly made a connection with star quarterback Jim Kelly. Brooks, Pro Bowl receiver Andre Reed, and tight end Pete Metzelaars were Kelly's primary targets on the season. Brooks saw a return to form, with 60 receptions for 714 yards and five touchdowns on the season. The Bills continued to dominate the AFC, going 12-4 on the regular season and again winning the conference. In the 1993-94 NFL Playoffs Divisional Round, Brooks caught six passes for 92 yards and two touchdowns in the Bills 29–23 win over the Los Angeles Raiders, including the game-sealing touchdown in the fourth quarter. In Super Bowl XXVIII, the Bills saw their fourth straight Super Bowl defeat, losing 13-30 to the Dallas Cowboys. Brooks had seven receptions for 63 yards in Super Bowl XXVIII.

The 1994 season was a down year for the Bills and Brooks. Coming off of four straight Super Bowl appearances, the Bills finished the season at a disappointing 7-9. Reed continued to shine, garnering most of the team's receptions with over 1,300 receiving yards on the season. Brooks started in nine games, recording 42 receptions for 482 yards and two touchdowns.

In 1995, Brooks and the Bills had a return to form. Reed was injured for much of the year, providing Brooks with more playing opportunities. Brooks took advantage of his expanded role and caught 53 passes for 763 yards and a career-high 11 touchdowns. The Bills went 10-6 on the season, winning the AFC East and making the playoffs. Brooks had three games in the regular season where he recorded at least 100 receiving yards and two touchdowns. In the 1995-96 NFL playoffs, the Bills defeated the Miami Dolphins in the Wild Card round 37-22 before losing to the Pittsburgh Steelers in the Divisional Round.

Brooks left the Bills after the 1995 season as an unrestricted free agent.

=== Washington Redskins (1996) ===
On May 9, 1996, Brooks signed a one-year contract with the Washington Redskins. Brooks was signed as a veteran presence and his playing time was limited. Brooks recorded two starts in the 1996 season for Washington, ending the season with 17 receptions for 224 yards.

Brooks finished his 11-year NFL career with 583 receptions for 8,001 yards and 46 touchdowns. He also recorded 18 rushing attempts for 106 yards.

=== NFL career statistics ===
==== Regular season ====
Legend
	Led the league
**Bold**	Career high

Year	Team	Games		Receiving					Returns			
Year	Team	GP	GS	Rec	Yds	Avg	Lng	TD	PR	Yds	KR	Yds
1986	IND	**16**	12	65	**1,131**	**17.4**	**84**	8	18	**141**	**8**	**143**
1987	IND	12	12	51	722	14.2	52	3	**22**	136	0	0
1988	IND	**16**	**16**	54	867	16.1	53	3	3	15	0	0
1989	IND	**16**	**16**	63	919	14.6	55	4	0	0	0	0
1990	IND	**16**	**16**	62	823	13.3	75	5	0	0	0	0
1991	IND	**16**	**16**	**72**	888	12.3	46	4	0	0	0	0
1992	IND	14	10	44	468	10.6	26	1	0	0	0	0
1993	BUF	**16**	13	60	714	11.9	32	5	1	3	0	0
1994	BUF	**16**	9	42	482	11.5	32	2	0	0	0	0
1995	BUF	15	10	53	763	14.4	51	**11**	6	35	0	0
1996	WAS	**16**	2	17	224	13.2	31	0	0	0	0	0
Career		169	132	583	8,001	13.7	84	46	50	330	8	143

==== Postseason ====
Year	Team	Games		Receiving					Returns			
Year	Team	GP	GS	Rec	Yds	Avg	Lng	TD	PR	Yds	KR	Yds
1987	IND	1	1	5	78	**15.6**	29	0	0	0	0	0
1993	BUF	**3**	**3**	**17**	**193**	11.4	25	**2**	0	0	0	0
1995	BUF	2	2	5	41	8.2	16	0	0	0	0	0
Career		6	6	27	312	11.6	29	2	0	0	0	0

== Post-playing career and personal life ==
In 1998, Brooks rejoined the Indianapolis Colts as the Director of Community Development/Player Relations. Brooks' family had remained in Indianapolis while he played in Buffalo and Washington. In 2002, Brooks was promoted by the Colts to Executive Director of Administration, serving in that role from 2002 to 2009. In 2020, Brooks returned to the Indianapolis Colts as the Team Ambassador, appearing on Colts radio and podcast programs.

Brooks is active in community projects, especially in his adopted hometown of Indianapolis. Brooks received the Sagamore of the Wabash by Indiana Governor Evan Bayh in 1990. From 1991-1992, he served as the Indianapolis Colts' United Way spokesman. In 1996, he received the Byron "Whizzer" White NFL Man of the Year Award for community impact. Brooks received several Indianapolis-based community leadership awards and has served on several non-profit boards. Brooks earned a Master's in Business Administration degree from Butler University while a member of the Colts.
