= Daniel Muir =

American football player (born 1983)

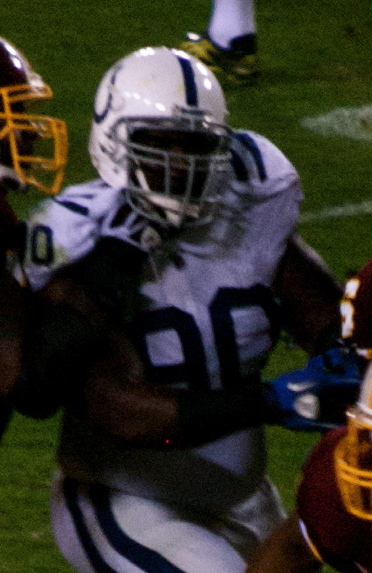
- Muir with the Colts in 2010

No. 95, 90, 97. 99
- Position: Nose tackle

Personal information
- Born: September 12, 1983 (age 43); Washington, D.C., U.S.
- Listed height: 6 ft 2 in (1.88 m)
- Listed weight: 298 lb (135 kg)

Career information
- College: Kent State
- NFL draft: 2007: undrafted

Career history
- Green Bay Packers (2007); Indianapolis Colts (2008−2010); St. Louis Rams (2011)*; Indianapolis Colts (2011); Green Bay Packers (2012)*; New York Jets (2012); Kansas City Chiefs (2013)*; Houston Texans (2013)*; Oakland Raiders (2013)
- * Offseason or practice squad member only

Career NFL statistics
- Total tackles: 128
- Sacks: 1.5
- Pass deflections: 1
- Stats at Pro Football Reference

Daniel Travanti Muir (US: /trəˌvɑːnti ˈmjʊər/ trə-VAHN-tee MURE; born September 12, 1983) is an American former professional football player who was a defensive tackle in the National Football League (NFL). He was signed by the Green Bay Packers as an undrafted free agent in 2007. He played college football for the Kent State Golden Flashes. Muir was also a member of the Indianapolis Colts, St. Louis Rams, New York Jets, Kansas City Chiefs, Houston Texans and Oakland Raiders.

In July 2024, Muir and his wife were arrested on criminal charges related to the abuse of their son.

== Early life ==
Muir attended Fairmont Heights High School and later transferred to Parkdale High School in Riverdale, Maryland where he was a four-year letterman. He played both defensive tackle and offensive guard. He earned All-State honors after finishing his senior season with 96 tackles, including 13.5 sacks. He recorded 179 tackles, including 28.5 sacks, his final two seasons. He also lettered in wrestling, where he finished second in the state as a junior and third as a senior.

== College career ==
Muir attended Kent State where he started 45 of his 46 career games there. He also left Kent State ranked third in school history in career sacks (14.5) and seventh in tackles-for-losses (35). He finished his career with 198 tackles, he also had three forced fumbles, two fumble recoveries, and one interception. He began his college career at defensive tackle before moving to defensive end, where he earned First-team All-MAC honors as a senior.

Muir did not play in 2002 due to the NCAA's initial eligibility guidelines. In 2003 as a freshman, he started the first 11 games before turning over his starting position to a senior in the season finale. He finished the season with 46 tackles, 7.5 for losses, 1.5 sacks and one blocked field goal. In 2004 as a sophomore, he started 11 games recording 48 tackles, eight for losses, and 4.5 sacks. In 2005 as a junior, he started 11 games and earned Second-team All-MAC honors, he recorded 52 tackles, 8.5 for losses, and three sacks. In 2006 as a senior, he started 12 games and recorded 52 tackles, 11 for losses, and 5.5 sacks. He returned his only career interception for five yards.

== Professional career ==
Pre-draft measurables
| Height | Weight | 40-yard dash | 10-yard split | 20-yard split | 20-yard shuttle | Three-cone drill | Vertical jump | Broad jump | Bench press |
|---|---|---|---|---|---|---|---|---|---|
| 6 ft 1 7/8 in (1.88 m) | 303 lb (137 kg) | 4.90 s | 1.69 s | 2.82 s | 4.59 s | 7.39 s | 29.5 in (0.75 m) | 9 ft 7 in (2.92 m) | 37 reps |
All values from Kent State's Pro Day

=== Green Bay Packers (first stint) ===
After going undrafted in the 2007 NFL draft, Muir signed with the Green Bay Packers on May 4, 2007. In 2007, he played in three games, after becoming the only undrafted rookie to make the roster out of training camp. He recorded eight tackles, four solo for the season. He played for the Packers in Dallas, Chicago, and against Detroit. Before the start of the 2008 season, he was waived by the Packers.

=== Indianapolis Colts (first stint) ===
After being waived by the Packers before the start of the 2008 season, he was claimed by the Indianapolis Colts. He was re-signed to a one-year $1.7 million contract on April 13, 2010.

=== St. Louis Rams ===
Muir joined the St. Louis Rams on July 31, 2011, by signing a one-year $1.85 million contract. He was cut on September 3, 2011.

=== Indianapolis Colts (second stint) ===
On October 10, 2011, Muir re-signed with the Colts. He was waived on November 8, 2011.

=== Green Bay Packers (second stint) ===
Muir signed with the Packers on March 23, 2012. He was released on August 31, 2012.

=== New York Jets ===
Muir was signed by the New York Jets on October 10, 2012. He was waived on October 30, 2012.

=== Kansas City Chiefs ===
Muir signed a reserve/future contract with the Kansas City Chiefs on January 18, 2013. He was released on June 14, 2013.

=== Houston Texans ===
On July 25, 2013, Muir signed with the Houston Texans. He was released by the Texans on August 31, 2013 due to an injury settlement.

=== Oakland Raiders ===
On October 9, 2013, Muir signed with the Oakland Raiders.

== Personal life ==
Muir is one of many siblings and was raised by his Jamaican native parents in Lanham, Maryland. He married his college sweetheart Kristin Wright on April 25, 2009. Muir currently resides in Logansport, Indiana with his family.

Muir hosted a Christmas dinner for homeless teens with the help of Outreach Inc.

Muir is currently the pastor of the Indiana chapter of Straitway Truth Ministry in Logansport, Indiana, where he lives on a 5.6-acre property owned by the ministry. Muir was invited to join the Tennessee-based Black Hebrew Israelite group that preaches Biblical literalism by former Packers teammate Kabeer Gbaja-Biamila.

== 2024 arrest ==
Muir was named a person of interest by Indiana State Police in the disappearance of his 14-year-old son Bryson on June 27, 2024. Bryson, who went missing on June 16, 2024, was found on July 3 safe during an Indiana State Police raid on the Muirs' Logansport property and placed in child services. On July 3, 2024, Muir was arrested for obstruction of justice and domestic battery, and his wife was arrested for obstruction of justice. The couple were denied bond as they were deemed flight risks, and their trial was scheduled for March 10, 2025.

== See also ==
- List of solved missing person cases (2020s)
