= Kabeer Gbaja-Biamila =

American football player (born 1977)

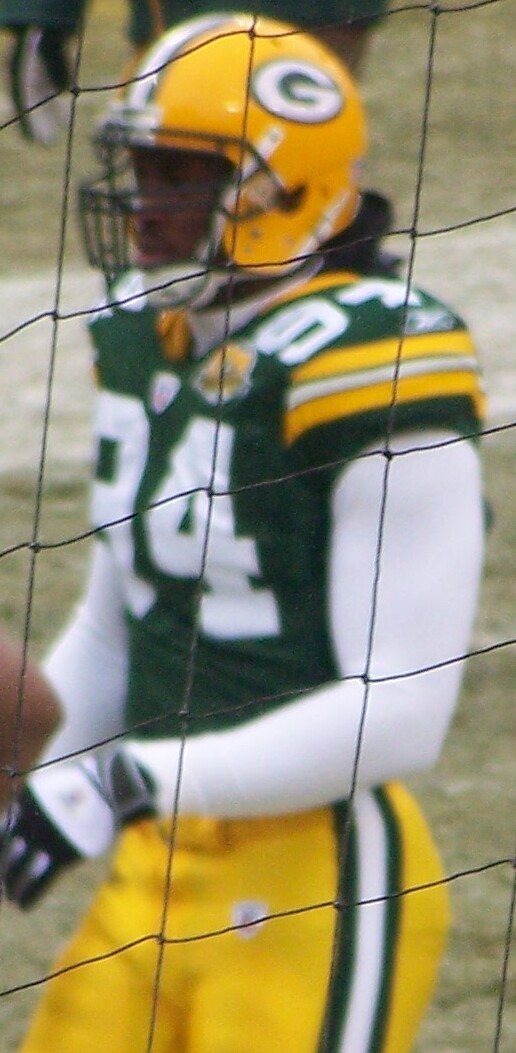
- Gbaja-Biamila with the Green Bay Packers in 2007

No. 94
- Position: Defensive end

Personal information
- Born: September 24, 1977 (age 49); Los Angeles, California, U.S.
- Listed height: 6 ft 4 in (1.93 m)
- Listed weight: 249 lb (113 kg)

Career information
- High school: Crenshaw (Los Angeles)
- College: San Diego State (1995–1999)
- NFL draft: 2000: 5th round, 149th overall pick

Career history
- Green Bay Packers (2000–2008)

Awards and highlights
- Pro Bowl (2003); Green Bay Packers Hall of Fame; First-team All-Mountain West (1999)

Career NFL statistics
- Total tackles: 302
- Sacks: 74.5
- Forced fumbles: 17
- Fumble recoveries: 7
- Interceptions: 1
- Defensive touchdowns: 1
- Stats at Pro Football Reference

Muhammed-Kabeer Olarewaju Gbajabiamila Sr. (Note: Prefers the spelling "Gbaja-Biamila" for readability. His legal surname is "Gbajabiamila".) (/kəˈbɪər ˈbɑːdʒɑː ˌbiːəˈmɪlə/ kə-BEER BAH-jah BEE-ə-MIL-ə;; born September 24, 1977), nicknamed "KGB", is a Nigerian-American former professional football player who spent his entire nine-year career as a defensive end for the Green Bay Packers of the National Football League (NFL). He played college football for the San Diego State Aztecs. He was selected by Green Bay in the fifth round of the 2000 NFL draft. He was a Pro Bowl selection in 2003.

== Early life ==
Gbaja-Biamila attended Crenshaw High School in Los Angeles, California, and was a three-year letterman in football and in track and field.

While attending Crenshaw High School, Gbaja-Biamila was a student-owner of Food from the 'Hood, an organic food company that sprang from the 1992 Los Angeles riots. Food from the 'Hood eventually went on to launch a line of salad dressings that appeared in major Southern California grocery chains as well as on Amazon. For their work, Food from the 'Hood received the "American Achievement Award" from Newsweek, which featured both Gbaja-Biamila and other founders on its cover. On November 1, 1994 Prince Charles paid a visit to Crenshaw High School, upon an invitation from Food from the 'Hood.

== College career ==
Gbaja-Biamila attended San Diego State University where he was a three-year starter. He finished his career with the Aztecs with a school record 33 sacks, a mark previously held by former Packer Mike Douglass at 26 sacks. He was named a first-team all-conference selection in each of his last three seasons. He graduated with a degree in business administration.

== Professional career ==
In 2000, Gbaja-Biamila attended the NFL Combine as an outside linebacker, where he measured 6 ft 3⅝ in and 243 pounds and recorded a 4.65-second 40-yard dash. Pre-draft scouting reports noted uncertainty about whether he would be better suited as a defensive end or outside linebacker.

Pre-draft measurables
Height	Weight	40-yard dash	10-yard split	20-yard split	20-yard shuttle	Three-cone drill	Vertical jump	Broad jump	Bench press
6 ft 3 5/8 in (1.92 m)	243 lb (110 kg)	4.61 s	1.58 s	2.69 s	4.28 s	6.90 s	34.0 in (0.86 m)	10 ft 0 in (3.05 m)	21 reps
All values from NFL Combine

Gbaja-Biamila was chosen by the Packers in the fifth round of the 2000 NFL draft with the 149th overall selection. As a rookie, he appeared in seven games and recorded 1.5 sacks and nine total tackles.

Gbaja-Biamila broke out in the 2001 season. He recorded three sacks and a forced fumble in Week 1 against the Detroit Lions in a 28–6 victory. In Week 4, against the Tampa Bay Buccaneers, he had another three-sack game to go with a forced fumble in the 14–10 loss. He was named NFC Defensive Player of the Month for December 2001. He finished the 2001 season with 13.5 sacks, 24 total tackles, and three forced fumbles.

In Week 5, against the Chicago Bears, Gbaja-Biamila recorded a 72-yard interception return for a touchdown in the 34–21 victory. He had a three-sack game in Week 9 against the Miami Dolphins. He finished the 2002 season with 12 sacks, 47 total tackles, six passes defensed, and four forced fumbles in 15 games and 11 starts.

In 2003, Gbaja-Biamila became the first player in Packers history to record ten or more sacks in three consecutive seasons. He finished the 2003 season with ten sacks, 47 total tackles, and three forced fumbles in 16 starts. He was selected to the Pro Bowl that year.

Gbaja-Biamila recorded four sacks in a Week 17 victory over the Chicago Bears in the 2004 season. He was named NFC Defensive Player of the Week for his game against Chicago. In 2004, Gbaja-Biamila again recorded double-digit sacks, taking down opposing quarterbacks 13.5 times.

In the 2005 season, Gbaja-Bilamila started all 16 games and recorded eight sacks, 53 total tackles, and two forced fumbles.

During the 2006 season, Gbaja-Biamila appeared in all 16 games and started three. He recorded six sacks, 40 total tackles, and two forced fumbles.

In October 2007, Gbaja-Biamila broke the Green Bay Packers sack record with 69 sacks, which was previously held by Hall of Famer Reggie White with 68 1/2 sacks. Originally, Gbaja-Biamila was not credited with a third sack against Vikings quarterback Kelly Holcomb during the Packers vs. Vikings game on September 30. Later on in the week, the Elias Sports Bureau reviewed game footage and credited Gbaja-Biamila with a third sack on Kelly Holcomb, who was originally ruled as rushing for zero yards. He finished the 2007 season with 9.5 sacks, 26 total tackles, one pass defended, and two forced fumbles in 15 games and two starts.

Gbaja-Biamila with the Packers in 2008

Gbaja-Biamila played in seven games (one start) for the Packers in 2008, recording nine tackles, half a sack and a pass defensed. He was released on November 1 after the team activated defensive tackle Justin Harrell from the Physically Unable to Perform (PUP) list.

He was a 2013 inductee, along with Packer kicker Chris Jacke, into the Green Bay Packers Hall of Fame.

== NFL career statistics ==
Legend
**Bold**	Career high

=== Regular season ===
Year	Team	Games		Tackles					Interceptions					Fumbles			
Year	Team	GP	GS	Cmb	Solo	Ast	Sck	TFL	Int	Yds	TD	Lng	PD	FF	FR	Yds	TD
2000	GNB	7	0	9	8	1	1.5	1	0	0	0	0	0	0	0	0	0
2001	GNB	16	0	24	18	6	**13.5**	10	0	0	0	0	1	3	1	0	0
2002	GNB	15	11	47	36	11	12.0	**13**	**1**	**72**	**1**	**72**	**6**	**4**	1	0	0
2003	GNB	16	16	47	36	11	10.0	10	0	0	0	0	0	2	2	0	0
2004	GNB	16	15	47	33	14	**13.5**	**13**	0	0	0	0	2	2	0	0	0
2005	GNB	16	16	**53**	**37**	**16**	8.0	10	0	0	0	0	0	2	**3**	0	0
2006	GNB	16	13	40	28	12	6.0	7	0	0	0	0	0	2	0	0	0
2007	GNB	15	2	26	22	4	9.5	10	0	0	0	0	1	2	0	0	0
2008	GNB	7	1	9	7	2	0.5	0	0	0	0	0	1	0	0	0	0
		124	74	302	225	77	74.5	74	1	72	1	72	11	17	7	0	0

=== Playoffs ===
Year	Team	Games		Tackles					Interceptions					Fumbles			
Year	Team	GP	GS	Cmb	Solo	Ast	Sck	TFL	Int	Yds	TD	Lng	PD	FF	FR	Yds	TD
2001	GNB	2	0	1	1	0	1.0	1	0	0	0	0	0	0	0	0	0
2002	GNB	1	1	3	2	1	0.0	0	0	0	0	0	0	0	0	0	0
2003	GNB	2	2	**9**	4	**5**	0.0	1	0	0	0	0	0	0	0	0	0
2004	GNB	1	1	7	**6**	1	0.0	**3**	0	0	0	0	0	**1**	0	0	0
2007	GNB	2	0	3	2	1	**1.5**	2	0	0	0	0	0	0	0	0	0
		8	4	23	15	8	2.5	7	0	0	0	0	0	1	0	0	0

== Family and personal life ==
Gbaja-Biamila is the fifth child of his mother Bolatito Gbajabiamila (née Anjorin) and the second child of his father Mustapha Gbajabiamila. He is the older brother of former NFL linebacker Akbar Gbajabiamila.

His middle name "Ọláńrewájú" means "Wealth is moving forward" in the Yoruba language, while his surname “Gbàjàbíàmílà” translates to "One who, while fighting, pretends to be separating a fight."

Both of his parents were Muslim until his mother converted to Christianity. While he was raised in a Sunni Muslim household, during his rookie season with the Green Bay Packers he converted to Christianity.

He was the coordinator at the local Celebration Church Bayside for Crown Financial Ministries, which teaches people how to manage money using Biblical principles. He was involved in the first faith-based event at Lambeau Field called Lambeau Leap of Faith in July 2007, where thousands of Christians gathered. Kabeer Gbaja-Biamila has been involved in faith-based and community initiatives. He served as a coordinator at Celebration Church Bayside for Crown Financial Ministries, an organization that teaches personal finance based on Biblical principles. He has also participated in faith-oriented events and outreach programs.

He formerly served on the board of directors at Freedom House Ministries, a shelter for homeless families in Green Bay. Each year, Freedom House helps over 100 families, including over 250 children, overcome homelessness and move into stable, permanent housing and employment. In 2007, he started Kabeer's Freedom House Sack Fund. He pledged, along with his teammates and members of the Green Bay community, $10,000 per sack registered in 2007 to go to his fund.

On April 3, 2016, Gbaja-Biamila appeared alongside 2016 Republican presidential candidates Ted Cruz and Scott Walker at a rally in Green Bay, Wisconsin.

Following retirement, he became involved with Straitway Truth Ministry, a Hebrew Israelite group that preaches biblical literalism, and denounced Christianity.

In 2017, Eileen filed for divorce from Gbaja-Biamila. She moved out with their seven children when he denounced Christianity and made plans to move the family to Straitway's compound in Lafayette, Tennessee. As of 2020, Gbaja-Biamila remained estranged from his eight children, the youngest of whom was born after the divorce.

Gbaja-Biamila married Bri Rainey, a member of Straitway's Kansas City chapter, in 2019. He received approval from the church to marry Rainey after it had denied his prior requests to marry several other women. She gave birth to the couple's first child in 2020. Gbaja-Biamila said he wanted to have 94 children, acknowledging that he'd need multiple partners to achieve the goal.

On December 17, 2019, Gbaja-Biamila was involved in an incident at his children's school event. Two members of Straitway Praiseland, a Wisconsin branch of Straitway Truth Ministry led by Gbaja-Biamila, were arrested during an incident at Assembly of God Church in Green Bay during a Christmas pageant put on by the private Providence Academy. Jordan Salmi and Ryan Desmith attended the pageant and triggered a trespassing complaint since they did not have children at the school. When they were arrested, they reportedly had concealed weapons on them without permits. The Green Bay Press-Gazette quoted Gbaja-Biamila saying, “They got my sons — my property — doing pagan worship, and I told them I forbid it, and they dishonor me and say it’s OK for my sons to dishonor their father.” He added, “They used the sons, the children, to oppress the man, and the woman rules over them, so that the man walks in error.”

On March 17, 2020, Gbaja-Biamila was arrested and charged with contempt of court during an appearance in court for his divorce from Eileen. He refused to sign a document that allowed Eileen to access their bank accounts, arguing that as a sovereign citizen, he was not subject to the law or the court and proclaimed, "I have my own laws which are superior.” During his arrest, he resisted attempts to be handcuffed, yelled at his ex-wife, and was Tasered and strapped to a chair by multiple officers.
