= Sid Justin =

American football player (born 1954)

No. 31, 26, 44
- Position: Defensive back

Personal information
- Born: August 14, 1954 (age 72); New Orleans, Louisiana, U.S.
- Listed height: 5 ft 10 in (1.78 m)
- Listed weight: 170 lb (77 kg)

Career information
- High school: Crenshaw; Los Angeles, California)
- College: Los Angeles Southwest (1973–1974); Long Beach State (1975–1976)
- NFL draft: 1977: undrafted

Career history
- Southern California Rhinos (1978); Los Angeles Rams (1979–1980); Tampa Bay Buccaneers (1980)*; Winnipeg Blue Bombers (1980); Buffalo Bills (1981); Baltimore Colts (1982–1983); Kansas City Chiefs (1983)*; Los Angeles Express (1984)*
- * Offseason or practice squad member only

Awards and highlights
- All-PCAA (1976)

Career NFL statistics
- Games played: 18
- Interceptions: 1
- Interception ret. yards: 13
- Touchdowns: 1
- Stats at Pro Football Reference

Career CFL statistics
- Games played: 2
- Interceptions: 1
- Interception ret. yards: 2

Sidney Arthur Justin, sometimes spelled Sydney Justin (born August 14, 1954), is an American former professional football player, singer and songwriter. A defensive back, he played for the Los Angeles Rams, Winnipeg Blue Bombers, and Baltimore Colts after playing college football at Los Angeles Southwest and Long Beach State. He also played for the minor league Southern California Rhinos and was briefly with the Tampa Bay Buccaneers, Buffalo Bills and Kansas City Chiefs, as well as the Los Angeles Express of the United States Football League (USFL). Following his football career, Justin was a member of several vocal groups, including Shalamar and The Miracles.

== Early life and education ==
Justin was born on August 14, 1954, in New Orleans, Louisiana. He attended Crenshaw High School in Los Angeles, California, where he was a gymnast rather than a football player. Justin started attending Los Angeles Southwest College in 1973 after his graduation from Crenshaw and was convinced by his friends to begin playing football. He was a starter as both a freshman and sophomore, before transferring to Long Beach State in 1975. He saw extensive playing time in his first year at Long Beach State and became a starter for his senior season. Justin was named All-Pacific Coast Athletic Association in his last year at cornerback.

== Professional football and coaching career ==
Justin went unselected in the 1977 NFL draft. He spent the entire 1977 season as a free agent. In 1978, he trained with several Los Angeles Rams players and one of them convinced the team to give Justin an invite to the spring minicamp. The team had many defensive backs at the time and one coach suggested that Justin go to play for the minor league Southern California Rhinos, which he did for the season. His performance there led him to receive interest again from the Rams, and they signed him for the 1979 season after buying out his rights from the Rhinos for $1,500.

Justin was considered a long shot to make the team, but impressed in preseason for his talent in man-to-man coverage and quickness. Ultimately, however, he was one of five released at the final roster cuts in August. Shortly after, at the start of September, he was re-signed due to an injury to Jeff Severson. Justin went on to appear in 13 games for the Rams that year, recording one interception and making an 80-yard blocked field goal return touchdown, the only score of his career, before being placed on injured reserve in mid-December due to a pulled hamstring suffered on the blocked field goal return. While he was on injured reserve, the Rams went on to be runners-up in Super Bowl XIV against the Pittsburgh Steelers.

External videos
- 1979 Week 13 - Rams vs. 49ers (1979). Video of Justin's only career touchdown from 48:40–50:14.

Justin was waived by the Rams on August 13, 1980, and was then claimed by the Tampa Bay Buccaneers. He was waived by Tampa Bay on August 25. He traveled to Canada and signed with the Winnipeg Blue Bombers of the Canadian Football League (CFL) on c. September 6. Justin played two games for the Blue Bombers, posting one interception return for two yards before being released at the end of the month.

Justin returned to the NFL and signed with the Buffalo Bills in February 1981. He was placed on injured reserve on August 17 and was released on August 31. He joined the Baltimore Colts for the 1982 season. Justin made the team and was the starting right cornerback to begin the season. He appeared in a total of five games, two as a starter, before suffering a cracked vertebrae which sidelined him for the rest of the season. Justin was waived by the Colts in March 1983.

Justin had a brief stint with the Kansas City Chiefs after being waived by the Colts, but was released in July. In October, he was signed by the Los Angeles Express of the United States Football League (USFL) for the 1984 season, joining his brother Tyrone who also played for the Express. He was released on January 21, 1984.

After ending his playing career, Justin became a coach. He began as an assistant to Harold Daniels at Harbor Junior College, before becoming a coach at Westchester High School in Los Angeles. He subsequently served two years as defensive coordinator at Granada Hills High School before accepting a position as defensive coordinator and defensive backs coach for the semi-professional Ventura Cardinals. The Cardinals folded after one season, and Justin then went to Taft High School as defensive backs coach, helping them reach the city championship.

In 2012, Justin became one of many former players to file lawsuits against the NFL for concussion-related injuries.

== Music career ==
Justin liked music from a young age, and participated in several talent shows in high school. After high school, he worked for a time with singer Candi Staton and performed for several movie soundtracks, including the songs "Shout" and "Shama Lama Ding Dong" in Animal House. He auditioned for the vocal group The Miracles in 1978 and was given the job, but turned it down to continue his football career. He also worked with Hawk Wolinski in producing the soundtrack for Wildcats.

During his football career, Justin would sing and write songs during the offseason, and was able to do it full-time after his retirement from the sport. He was part of the songwriting team Sylverspoon Productions, working with artists and groups including Leon Sylvers III, Glen Jones, Lakeside, The Whispers, Dynasty and Shalamar. He went on to join Shalamar soon afterwards as their lead singer, replacing Howard Hewett in 1987. Justin worked with Babyface and L.A. in producing the album Circumstantial Evidence, which featured the song "Love's Grown Deep" that placed number one on charts in Asia for five (Note: Listed as six on Justin's website.) months.

Justin received various different producing and songwriting positions afterwards. He produced for the soundtrack of the film Lambada, working with Tony Terry for the song "Tease Me, Please Me." He also sung in Bobby Brown's platinum hits "Every Little Step" and "Rock Wit'cha." Justin performed in concerts with various other groups, including The Gap Band, Zapp, Earth, Wind & Fire, and Rose Royce. In 1990, Justin wrote, produced, and performed half of the album Wake Up, the last album recorded by Shalamar before disbanding.

In 1993, Justin joined The Miracles and after several concerts was introduced as lead singer. He has performed with them at numerous locations over many years, later being joined by his brother Kerry. He and The Miracles have made appearances on various television shows, including Good Morning America, Today, George & Alana, Home & Family, The Pat Bullard Show, and Donny & Marie, among others. The National Football League has had Justin sing The Star-Spangled Banner on several occasions prior to games.

== Later and personal life ==
Justin is also an artist; he attended Otis Art Institute and was taught by Charles W. White and Ernie Barnes. His work has been featured at several exhibits.

Justin is a brother of USFL defensive back Tyrone Justin, NFL and USFL defensive back Kerry Justin, and the father of CFL and Baltimore Ravens defensive back Airabin Justin. He and Tyrone appeared as extras in the television series 1st & Ten.

Justin published a book on how to play defensive back, titled The Lost Art, in June 2016. He is a Christian.
