= Food from the 'Hood =

Non-profit organization

Food from the 'Hood was a Californian high school-based, student-owned, organically farmed products company that also marketed a line of natural salad dressings. Founded in 1993, the non-profit organization was still in business in 2003, during the 10th anniversary of the Los Angeles riots from which it was born.

== Early history ==
The program was founded in 1993 in the aftermath of the 1992 Los Angeles riots. In the wake of the riots, Crenshaw High School biology teacher Tammy Bird, met a non-profit organization, Gardens For Kids, which offered to help her restore the garden in the back of her classroom. Melinda McMullen, a public relations executive, joined Bird shortly thereafter. Together, they offered students at Crenshaw High School the opportunity to help rebuild their community by reclaiming a 1/4-acre weed-infested plot of land behind Bird's classroom.

Initially, the students decided to grow organic foods and donate 25% of their bounty to a local non-profit organization called "Helpers for the Homeless and the Hungry". They decided they would sell the rest at the Santa Monica Farmer's Market under the name "Food from the 'Hood". At the end of the first year, they had a total of $600, which funded small college scholarships for the three graduating students. With more students scheduled to graduate the following year, it was clear that the students needed another plan.

== Press coverage and growth ==
In October 1993, Ron Harris, a columnist for the Los Angeles Times, publicized their story in a widely-read column. Norris Bernstein, former president of Bernstein's Salad Dressing, heard about the students' efforts and contacted Food from the 'Hood. Now retired, Bernstein volunteered to help with the final work on the salad dressing formula, help price the product, and develop a marketing plan.

Bernstein became part of the adult team of advisers. Bird supervised the students' work garden and helped manage the weekly trips to the Santa Monica Farmers' market, while McMullen focused on trying to generate visibility for the effort. Eventually, CBS Morning News took an interest in the story and sent national correspondent Hattie Kauffman out to cover the story. Over the next three years, Kauffman became close to the students—eventually doing three pieces on Food from the 'Hood.

Within a week of the piece airing on CBS Morning News, the students received a call from a representative from Rebuild LA, a non-profit organization formed after the riots to help revitalize of the city that were impacted by the riots. An executive from one of their founding companies had seen the piece on CBS Morning News and wanted to learn more. The students had their business plan ready and within a few weeks Food from the 'Hood, then a 501(c) corporation, received a $50,000 grant to help scale up their salad dressing company. In December 1993, the students farmed and donated holiday food packages to "Helpers for the Homeless and the Hungry".

A few months later, the students from Food From the 'Hood launched the first in what would become a line of three flavors of Food from the 'Hood salad dressing. The group continued to garner press coverage, including during a visit from Prince Charles, and a trip to Washington, D.C., to be honored at Newsweek's American Achievement Awards. Their salad dressing was then in more than 2,000 grocery stores in 22 western states.

In 1995, the original founders of Food From the 'Hood graduated from Crenshaw High School. Nearly all of the graduates went on to attend four-year colleges, including University of California, Berkeley; San Diego State; Babson College; Howard University; University of California, Santa Cruz; California State, Northridge; Stanford University; Cornell College; Carnegie Mellon University; and Morehouse College.

== Later years and closing ==
Food from the 'Hood continued for a number of years after the original founders went off to college, and continued to fund college scholarships. In 2002, Oprah Winfrey awarded the organization a major contribution as part of her "Use Your Life" Awards. The organization closed a few years later, but many of the Food From the 'Hood student-owners continue to stay in close touch.
