= Russell Copeland =

American football player (born 1971)

No. 85, 16, 86, 5
- Position: Wide receiver

Personal information
- Born: November 4, 1971 (age 55); Tupelo, Mississippi, U.S.
- Listed height: 6 ft 0 in (1.83 m)
- Listed weight: 200 lb (91 kg)

Career information
- High school: Tupelo
- College: Memphis
- NFL draft: 1993: 4th round, 111th overall pick

Career history
- Buffalo Bills (1993–1996); Philadelphia Eagles (1997–1998); Green Bay Packers (1998); Memphis Maniax (2000); Toronto Argonauts (2001)

Career NFL statistics
- Receptions: 103
- Receiving yards: 1,460
- Receiving touchdowns: 2
- Stats at Pro Football Reference

Russell Samoan Copeland (born November 4, 1971) is an American former professional football player who was a wide receiver in the National Football League (NFL) for the Buffalo Bills, Green Bay Packers, and Philadelphia Eagles. He played college football for the Memphis Tigers, where he was teammates with future NFL hall of fame receiver Isaac Bruce. In three seasons, Copeland caught 116 passes for 1,753 yards and 12 touchdowns, while adding another 536 yards returning punts and kickoffs. He was a 1992 All-IFA Football team selection. He was selected by the Bills in the fourth round of the 1993 NFL draft.

In his rookie season, Copeland gained 952 all-purpose yards, assisting his team to a championship appearance in Super Bowl XXVIII. His best season was in 1995, when he caught 42 passes for 646 yards and a touchdown. Copeland finished his career with 103 receptions for 1,463 yards and 9 touchdowns, and 2,270 all-purpose yards.

After his career in the NFL, Copeland played 1 game for the Toronto Argonauts of the Canadian Football League (CFL) in 2001. While with the Buffalo Bills, Russell would hit the drum solo to Phil Collins' song, "In the Air Tonight" on point during pregame warmups at then, Rich Stadium
