= The Whispers discography =

Artist discography

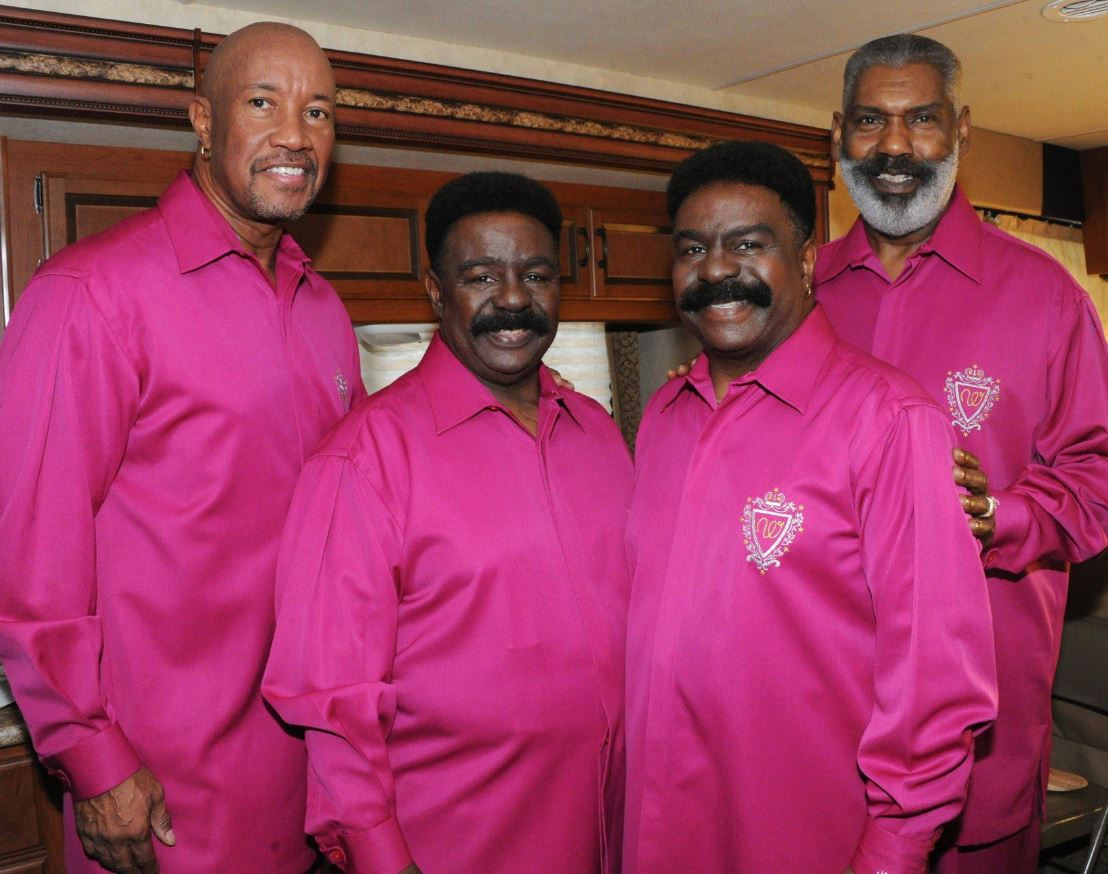
- The Whispers in 2013
- Studio albums: 24
- Live albums: 1
- Compilation albums: 13
- Singles: 77

The discography of The Whispers, an American rhythm and blues group, consists of thirty-two studio albums, one live album, seventy-seven singles and thirteen official compilation albums.

== Studio albums ==
List of studio albums, with selected chart positions
Title	Album details	Peak chart positions				Certifications
Title	Album details	US	US R&B/HH	CAN	UK	Certifications
The Whispers/Planets of Life	Released: 1970; Label: Soul Clock	—	48	—	—	
The Whispers' Love Story	Released: 1971; Label: Janus	186	34	—	—	
Life and Breath	Released: 1972; Label: Janus	—	44	—	—	
Bingo	Released: 1974; Label: Janus	192	40	—	—	
One for the Money	Released: 1976; Label: Soul Train	189	40	—	—	
Open Up Your Love	Released: 1977; Label: Soul Train	65	23	—	—	
Headlights	Released: 1978; Label: SOLAR	77	22	80	—	
Whisper in Your Ear	Released: 1979; Label: SOLAR	146	28	—	—	
Happy Holidays to You	Released: 1979; Label: SOLAR	—	50	—	—	
The Whispers	Released: 1979; Label: SOLAR	6	1	—	—	US: Platinum
Imagination	Released: 1980; Label: SOLAR	23	3	—	42	US: Gold
This Kind of Lovin'	Released: 1981; Label: SOLAR	100	15	—	—	
Love Is Where You Find It	Released: 1982; Label: SOLAR	35	1	—	—	US: Gold
Love for Love	Released: 1983; Label: SOLAR	37	2	—	—	
So Good	Released: 1984; Label: SOLAR	88	8	—	—	
Just Gets Better with Time	Released: 1987; Label: SOLAR	22	3	—	63	US: Platinum
More of the Night	Released: 1990; Label: Capitol	83	8	—	—	US: Gold
My Brother's Keeper	Released: 1993; Label: Capitol	151	18	—	—	
Christmas Moments	Released: 1994; Label: Capitol	—	42	—	—	
Toast to the Ladies	Released: 1995; Label: Capitol	92	8	—	—	
Songbook, Vol. 1: The Songs of Babyface	Released: 1997; Label: Interscope	—	27	—	—	
For Your Ears Only	Released: 2006; Label: Satin Tie	—	88	—	—	
Thankful	Released: 2009; Label: Kingdom	172	25	—	—	
"—" denotes a recording that did not chart or was not released in that territory.

== Live albums ==
List of live albums, with selected chart positions
Title	Album details	Peak chart positions	
Title	Album details	US	US R&B/HH
Live from Las Vegas	Released: 2007; Label: Satin Tie	—	—
"—" denotes a recording that did not chart or was not released in that territory.

== Compilation albums ==
List of compilation albums, with selected chart positions
Title	Album details	Peak chart positions	
Title	Album details	US	US R&B/HH
Greatest Hits	Released: 1975; Label: Janus	—	48
The Best of the Whispers	Released: 1982; Label: SOLAR	180	—
Vintage Whispers	Released: 1989; Label: SOLAR	—	—
In the Mood	Released: 1990; Label: SOLAR	—	—
Greatest Hits	Released: 1990; Label: Unidisc	—	—
30th Anniversary Anthology	Released: 1994; Label: Sequel	—	—
Greatest Slow Jams, Vol. 1	Released: 1996; Label: SOLAR	—	87
Greatest Hits	Released: 1997; Label: SOLAR	—	89
The Best of the Whispers	Released: 2000; Label: EMI-Capitol	—	—
Early Gold & New Spins	Released: 2001; Label: Purple Pyramid	—	—
Greatest Slow Jams, Vol. 2	Released: 2001; Label: SOLAR	—	—
Best of the Whispers	Released: 2002; Label: BMG Int'l	—	—
Anthology	Released: 2003; Label: The Right Stuff	—	—
"—" denotes a recording that did not chart or was not released in that territory.

== Singles ==
=== 1960s ===
List of singles, with selected chart positions
Title	Year	Peak chart positions		Certifications
Title	Year	US	US R&B/HH	Certifications
"It Only Hurts for a Little While"	1964	—	—	
"Never Again"	1965	—	—	
"The Dip"	1965	—	—	
"As I Sit Here"	1965	—	—	
"Doctor Love"	1965	—	—	
"I Was Born When You Kissed Me"	1966	—	—	
"Take a Lesson from the Teacher"	1966	—	—	
"You Got a Man on Your Hands"	1967	—	—	
"Needle in a Haystack"	1967	—	—	
"Great Day"	1968	—	—	
"I Was Born When You Kissed Me" (re-release)	1969	—	—	
"The Time Will Come"	1969	—	17	
"What Will I Do"	1969	—	—	
"—" denotes releases that did not chart or were not released in that territory.

=== 1970s ===
List of singles, with selected chart positions
Title	Year	Peak chart positions									Certifications
Title	Year	US	US Dan	US R&B/HH	BE (FLA)	FRA	IRE	NL	NZ	UK	Certifications
"Planets of Life"	1970	—	—	—	—	—	—	—	—	—	
"Seems Like I Gotta Do Wrong"	1970	50	—	6	—	—	—	—	—	—	
"I'm the One"	1970	—	—	—	—	—	—	—	—	—	
"There's a Love for Everyone"	1970	— (Note: "There's a Love for Everyone" did not enter the US Billboard Hot 100, but may have peaked at number 16 on the Bubbling Under Hot 100 Singles chart.)	—	31	—	—	—	—	—	—	
"Your Love Is So Doggone Good"	1971	93	—	19	—	—	—	—	—	—	
"Where Have You Been"	1971	—	—	—	—	—	—	—	—	—	
"Can't Help But Love You"	1972	— (Note: "Can't Help But Love You" did not enter the US Billboard Hot 100, but peaked at number 14 on the Bubbling Under Hot 100 Singles chart.)	—	35	—	—	—	—	—	—	
"I Only Meant to Wet My Feet"	1972	—	—	27	—	—	—	—	—	—	
"Somebody Loves You"	1972	94	—	45	—	—	—	—	—	—	
"P.O.W. - M.I.A. (Prisoners of War - Missing in Action)"	1973	—	—	—	—	—	—	—	—	—	
"Feel Like Comin' Home"	1973	—	—	—	—	—	—	—	—	—	
"A Mother for My Children" (Note: "A Mother for My Children" reached number 90 on Canada's RPM Charts.)	1973	92	—	32	—	—	—	—	—	54 (Note: Chart position is from the official UK "Breakers List".)	
"Bingo"	1974	—	—	40	—	—	—	—	—	—	
"What More Can a Girl Ask For?"	1974	—	—	60	—	—	—	—	—	—	
"Where There Is Love"	1974	—	—	—	—	—	—	—	—	—	
"All I Ever Do (Is Dream of You)"	1975	—	—	—	—	—	—	—	—	—	
"Give a Little Love"	1975	—	—	—	—	—	—	—	—	—	
"In Love Forever"	1975	—	—	40	—	—	—	—	—	—	
"One for the Money (Part 1)"	1976	88	8	10	—	—	—	—	—	—	
"Living Together (In Sin)"	1976	— (Note: "Living Together (In Sin)" did not enter the US Billboard Hot 100, but peaked at number 1 on the Bubbling Under Hot 100 Singles chart.)	—	21	—	—	—	—	—	—	
"You're Only as Good as You Think You Are"	1977	—	—	91	—	—	—	—	—	—	
"Make It with You"	1977	94	16	10	—	—	—	—	—	59	
"I'm Gonna Make You My Wife"	1977	—	—	54	—	—	—	—	—	—	
"(You're A) Special Part of My Life"	1978	—	—	—	—	—	—	—	—	—	
"(Let's Go) All the Way"	1978	— (Note: "(Let's Go) All the Way" did not enter the US Billboard Hot 100, but peaked at number 1 on the Bubbling Under Hot 100 Singles chart.)	—	10	—	—	—	—	—	—	
"(Olivia) Lost and Turned Out"	1978	—	—	13	—	—	—	—	—	—	
"Happy Holidays to You"	1978	—	—	—	—	—	—	—	—	—	
"Can't Do without Love"	1979	—	—	43	—	—	—	—	—	—	
"Homemade Lovin'"	1979	—	—	66	—	—	—	—	—	—	
"A Song for Donny"	1979	—	—	21	—	—	—	—	—	—	
"And the Beat Goes On"	1979	19	1	1	30	12	14	19	7	2	US: Gold; BPI: Silver
"—" denotes releases that did not chart or were not released in that territory.

=== 1980s ===
List of singles, with selected chart positions
Title	Year	Peak chart positions									Certifications
Title	Year	US	US A/C	US Dan	US R&B/HH	BE (FLA)	FRA	IRE	NL	UK	Certifications
"Lady"	1980	28	40	—	3	—	—	—	—	55	
"My Girl"	1980	—	—	—	—	—	—	—	—	26	
"Out the Box"	1980	—	—	—	—	—	—	—	—	—	
"Imagination"	1980	—	—	—	—	—	—	—	—	—	
"It's a Love Thing"	1981	28	—	4	2	9	10	17	11	9	
"I Can Make It Better"	1981	— (Note: "I Can Make It Better" did not enter the US Billboard Hot 100, but peaked at number 5 on the Bubbling Under Hot 100 Singles chart.)	—	4	40	—	—	—	—	44	
"This Kind of Lovin'"	1981	—	—	20	17	—	—	—	—	—	
"I'm the One for You"	1981	—	—	—	—	—	—	—	—	—	
"In the Raw"	1982	— (Note: "In the Raw" did not enter the US Billboard Hot 100, but peaked at number 3 on the Bubbling Under Hot 100 Singles chart.)	—	8	8	—	—	—	—	—	
"Emergency"	1982	—	—	—	22	—	—	—	—	—	
"Love is Where You Find It"	1982	—	—	—	—	—	—	—	—	—	
"Tonight"	1983	84	—	18	4	—	—	—	—	—	
"Keep On Lovin' Me"	1983	—	—	18	4	—	—	—	—	—	
"This Time"	1983	—	—	—	32	—	—	—	—	81	
"Contagious"	1984	— (Note: "Contagious" did not enter the US Billboard Hot 100, but peaked at number 5 on the Bubbling Under Hot 100 Singles chart.)	—	59	10	33	—	—	—	56	
"Some Kinda Lover"	1985	— (Note: "Some Kinda Lover" did not enter the US Billboard Hot 100, but peaked at number 6 on the Bubbling Under Hot 100 Singles chart.)	—	—	17	—	—	—	—	91	
"Don't Keep Me Waiting"	1985	—	—	—	60	—	—	—	—	—	
"Hello Stranger" (with Carrie Lucas)	1985	—	—	—	20	—	—	—	—	—	
"And the Beat Goes On" (re-release)	1987	—	—	—	—	26	39	—	—	45	
"Rock Steady"	1987	7	49	—	1	—	—	—	45	38	
"Special F/X"	1987	—	—	—	—	—	—	—	—	69	
"Just Gets Better with Time"	1987	—	—	—	12	—	—	—	—	—	
"In the Mood"	1987	—	—	—	16	—	—	—	—	—	
"No Pain, No Gain"	1988	—	—	—	74	—	—	—	—	81	
"—" denotes releases that did not chart or were not released in that territory.

=== 1990s-present ===
List of singles, with selected chart positions
Title	Year	Peak chart positions		Certifications
Title	Year	US	US R&B/HH	Certifications
"Innocent"	1990	55	3	
"My Heart Your Heart"	1990	—	4	
"Mind Blowing"	1990	—	—	
"Give It to Me"	1990	—	—	
"Is It Good to You"	1991	—	7	
"I Want 2B the 1 4U"	1991	—	58	
"Make Sweet Love to Me"	1995	—	41	
"Come on Home"	1995	—	60	
"I'm Gonna Make You My Wife" (re-release)	1996	—	—	
"Caravan of Love" (with Russ Freeman & the Rippingtons)	1996	—	89	
"My, My, My"	1997	—	73	
"Where There Is Love" (re-release)	2002	—	—	
"—" denotes releases that did not chart or were not released in that territory.
