= Headlight (disambiguation) =

A headlight is a device used to light the road ahead of a vehicle.

Headlight or headlamp may also refer to:

== Lights ==
- Headlamp (outdoor), a mobile lighting device fastened to a person's head for outdoor activities
- Carbide lamp, a type of lamp that produces and burns acetylene, created by the reaction of calcium carbide with water, previously used for vehicle headlamps

== Software ==
- Headlight Software, software developer and creator of the GetRight download manager

== Music ==
- Headlights (band), an indie rock band from Champaign, Illinois, United States that formed in 2004, active until at least 2009

=== Albums ===
- Headlights (The Whispers album), 1978
- Headlights (Alex G album), 2025

=== Songs ===
- "Headlights" (Alok and Alan Walker song), 2022
- "Headlights" (Cat Power song), 1993
- "Headlights" (Eminem song), 2013
- "Headlights" (Montgomery Gentry song), 2014
- "Headlights" (Robin Schulz song), 2015
- "Headlights", song by Beverly Ross, B-side to "Stop Laughing At Me", 1958
- "Headlights", song by Bug Hunter from Bigger Than Myself, 2020
- "Headlights", song by Lloyd Cole from Plastic Wood, 2001
- "Headlights", song by Driver 67, 1979
- "Headlights", song by the Michael Stanley Band, B-side to "Poor Side Of Town", 1986
- "Headlights", song by New Model Army from Strange Brotherhood, 1998
- "Headlights", song by Nine Black Alps from Everything Is, 2005
- "Headlights", song by Pvris from Evergreen, 2023
- "Headlights", song by Sean Lennon from Friendly Fire, 2006
- "Headlights", song by Thieves (band), B-side to "400 Dragons", 1979
- "Headlights", song by The Whispers, B-side to "(Let's Go) All The Way", 1978
