= Love for Love (album) =

1983 studio album by The Whispers

Studio album by the Whispers
- Released: March 31, 1983
- Recorded: Late 1982 – winter 1983
- Studios: The Automatt (San Francisco, California); Studio Masters (Los Angeles, California); United Western Recorders (Hollywood, California); Larrabee Sound Studios (North Hollywood, California)
- Genre: R&B
- Length: 42:43
- Label: SOLAR
- Producers: Leon Sylvers III; The Whispers; Nicholas Caldwell; Al Johnson; Ray Obiedo; Grady Wilkins; Ricky Sylvers; William Shelby

The Whispers chronology
Love Is Where You Find It (1981)	Love for Love (1983)	So Good (1984)

Singles from Love for Love
- 1. "Tonight" Released: 1983; 2. "Keep On Lovin’ Me" Released: 1983; 3. "This Time" Released: 1983

Professional ratings
Review scores
Source	Rating
AllMusic	3/5 stars

Love for Love is the fourteenth studio album by the American R&B/Soul vocal group the Whispers, released in 1983 by SOLAR Records.

== Track listing ==
No.	Title	Writer(s)	Length
1.	"Tonight"	Jerry Knight	5:46
2.	"Keep On Lovin’ Me"	Kevin Spencer, Wardell Potts Jr., William "Dr. Z" Zimmerman	5:50
3.	"Love for Love"	Ray Obiedo, Teresa Trull	4:25
4.	"This Time"	Grady Wilkins, Percy Scott	5:22
5.	"Had It Not Been for You"	Al Johnson	4:10
6.	"Try It Again"	Ray Obeido, Teresa Trull	3:47
7.	"Do They Turn You On"	Dana Meyers, Leroy Hall, William Shelby	5:20
8.	"Keep Your Love Around"	Clint McIntyre, Jeffrey Holden, John Miles	4:06
9.	"Lay It on Me"	Jeffrey Holden, Clinton McIntyre, John Miles	3:57

== Personnel ==
The Whispers

- Nicholas Caldwell
- Leaveil Degree
- Marcus Hutson
- Wallace "Scotty" Scott
- Walter Scott

Musicians

- Joey Gallo – keyboards (1, 8)
- Rickey Smith – keyboards (1, 2, 8), bass synthesizer (8)
- Kevin Spencer – keyboards (1)
- Vincent Brantley – keyboards (2)
- Frank Martin – Oberheim OB-X (3, 6), Prophet-5 (3, 6)
- Ray Obiedo – keyboards (3, 6), guitars (3, 5–7, 9)
- George Duke – keyboard solo (3)
- Percy Scott – acoustic grand piano (4), acoustic piano (5, 9)
- Grady Wilkins – Fender Rhodes (4, 7), Polymoog (4), orchestra bells (4), acoustic piano (5, 7, 9), bells (7), vibraphone (7)
- Al Johnson – Fender Rhodes (5, 9)
- William Shelby – keyboards (8)
- Horace Coleman – guitars (1, 2)
- Ricky Sylvers – guitars (2)
- Emilio Conesa – guitars (4)
- Leon Sylvers III – bass (1, 2), percussion (2, 8)
- Marc Van Wageningen – bass (3)
- Melvin Coleman – bass (4, 5, 7, 9)
- Wardell Potts – drums (1, 2, 8), keyboards (2)
- Paul Van Wageningen – drums (3, 5, 6, 9)
- Kirk Perkins – drums (4, 7), percussion (4)
- Janice Gower – string conductor (2, 4–9)

Music arrangements

- Jerry Knight – rhythm and vocal arrangements (1)
- Leon Sylvers III – rhythm arrangements (1, 2, 8), vocal arrangements (2)
- The Whispers – rhythm and vocal arrangements (1)
- Wardell Potts – rhythm arrangements (2)
- Ricky Sylvers – vocal arrangements (2)
- Benjamin Wright – horn and string arrangements (2, 8)
- Ray Obiedo – rhythm and vocal arrangements (3, 6)
- John Parrish – string arrangements (4, 6, 7)
- Percy Scott – rhythm arrangements (4)
- Grady Wilkins – rhythm arrangements (4), vocal arrangements (4, 7)
- Al Johnson – rhythm, string and vocal arrangements (5, 9)
- Nicholas Caldwell – rhythm and vocal arrangements (7)
- William Shelby – rhythm and vocal arrangements (8)

== Production ==
- The Whispers – executive producers, producers (3–6, 9)
- Leon Sylvers III – producer (1, 2, 8)
- Ricky Sylvers – producer (2)
- Ray Obiedo – co-producer (3, 6)
- Grady Wilkins – co-producer (4)
- Al Johnson – co-producer (5, 9)
- Nicholas Caldwell – producer (7)
- William Shelby – producer (8)
- Robert Brown – recording
- Steve Hodge – recording, mixing
- Leslie Ann Jones – recording
- Wally Traugott – mastering at Capitol Records (Hollywood, California)
- Dina Andrews – A&R coordinator
- Carmen Davis – A&R coordinator, album concept
- Denise Minobe – art direction, design
- Norm Ung – art direction, design
- Leaveil Degree – album concept
- Jane Van Tamelan – cover illustration
- Bobby Holland – photography

== Charts ==
=== Weekly charts ===
Chart (1983)	Peak position
US Billboard 200	37
US Top R&B/Hip-Hop Albums (Billboard)	2

=== Year-end charts ===
Chart (1983)	Position
US Billboard 200	89
US Top R&B/Hip-Hop Albums (Billboard)	13
