= Ben Wright =

Ben or Benjamin Wright may refer to:

Ben

- Ben Wright (American actor) (born 1969) and stuntman, "Jack" in the original Broadway production of Into the Woods (1987)
- Ben Wright (bishop) (1942–2010), Australian Anglican bishop
- Ben Wright (cricketer) (born 1987), English cricketer, currently playing for Glamorgan
- Ben Wright (English actor) (1915–1989), British film and radio actor
- Ben Wright (footballer, born 1980), English footballer
- Ben Wright (footballer, born 1988), English footballer
- Ben Wright (journalist), BBC political correspondent
- Ben Wright, militiaman who led a massacre on the Modoc people during the Modoc War of 1872–1873
- Ben Wright (powerlifter) (born 1987), Australian Paralympic powerlifter

Benjamin

- Benjamin Wright (civil engineer) (1770–1842), American civil engineer
- Benjamin Wright (composer) (born 1946), American producer and composer
- Benjamin Angus Wright, British media composer
- Benjamin D. Wright (1799–1874), Florida lawyer, journalist, and Whig politician
- Benjamin Drake Wright (1926–2015), American psychometrician
- Benjamin Fletcher Wright (1900–1976), American author and educator
