= So Good (The Whispers album) =

Studio album by the Whispers
- Released: July 26, 1984
- Recorded: March–July, 1984
- Studios: QCA (Cincinnati, Ohio); Devonshire (North Hollywood, California); Mars (Hollywood, California); Studio Masters (Los Angeles, California); The Automatt (San Francisco, California)
- Genres: Soul, funk, R&B
- Length: 45:40
- Label: SOLAR
- Producers: Leon Sylvers III; Reggie Calloway; Nicholas Caldwell; Wardell Potts; Wilmer Raglin; Grady Wilkins

The Whispers chronology
Love for Love (1983)	So Good (1984)	Just Gets Better with Time (1987)

So Good is a studio album by the American vocal group the Whispers, released on July 26, 1984, via SOLAR Records. The album reached number eight on the Billboard Soul Albums chart. Phyllis Hyman sang on "Suddenly".

== Critical reception ==
Professional ratings
Review scores
Source	Rating
AllMusic	3/5 stars
The Philadelphia Inquirer	3/4 stars

The Philadelphia Inquirer noted that, "with roots in do-wop street singing, the Whispers can turn on high-energy funk and then come back with something beautifully sophisticated."

== Track listing ==
1. "Some Kinda Lover" (Bo Watson, Kenneth Edmonds) - 5:53
2. "Contagious" (Bo Watson, Bobby Lovelace, Melvin Gentry, Reggie Calloway) - 5:00
3. "Sweet Sensation" (Barry Sarna, Pamela Phillips Oland, Wardell Potts) - 4:46
4. "On Impact" (Kevin Walker, Pamela Phillips Oland, Wilmer Raglin) - 5:25
5. "Suddenly" (Grady Wilkins, Percy Scott) - 5:48
6. "Don't Keep Me Waiting" (Kenneth Edmonds) - 4:36
7. "Are You Going My Way" (Nicholas Caldwell) - 5:08
8. "Never Too Late" (Bill Simmons, Bo Watson, Bobby Lovelace, Kenneth Gant, Nicholas Caldwell, Reggie Calloway) - 3:40
9. "So Good" (Leon Sylvers III, Pamela Phillips Oland, Rickey Smith) - 3:18

== Personnel ==
The Whispers

- Nicholas Caldwell – backing vocals (1, 2, 5–8), vocals (3, 4, 9)
- Leaveil Degree – backing vocals (1, 2, 5–8), vocals (3, 4, 9)
- Marcus Hutson – backing vocals (1, 2, 5–8), vocals (3, 4, 9)
- Wallace "Scotty" Scott – lead vocals (1, 2, 5–8), backing vocals (1, 2, 5–8), vocals (3, 4, 9)
- Walter Scott – backing vocals (1, 2, 5–8), vocals (3, 4, 9), lead vocals (5)

Musicians

- Bo Watson – keyboards (1, 2), backing vocals (2), synthesizer solo (6), acoustic piano and solo (8)
- Barry Sarna – keyboards (3)
- Rickey Smith – bass synthesizer (3), keyboards (9)
- Kevin Walker – keyboards (4, 9), guitars (4), bass synthesizer (4), drum machine programming (4)
- Percy Scott – keyboards (5, 7)
- Grady Wilkins – keyboards (5, 7), string machine (5)
- Kenneth Edmonds – keyboards (6)
- Bill Simmons – keyboards (8)
- Marquis Dair – keyboards (9)
- Dana Marshall – keyboards (9), bass synthesizer (9)
- Melvin Gentry – guitars (1, 2)
- Emilio Conesa – guitars (5)
- Larry White – guitars (5, 7)
- Horace Coleman – guitars (9)
- Kenneth Gant – bass (1, 6)
- Leon Sylvers III – bass guitar (3), drum machine programming (9)
- Rick Brown – bass guitar (4)
- Melvin Coleman – bass (5, 7)
- Bobby Lovelace – drums (2, 6, 8)
- Wardell Potts – drum machine programming (3)
- Peter Sausone – Simmons drums (3)
- Wilmer Raglin – drum machine programming (4)
- Kirk Perkins – drums (5, 7)
- James "Timbali" Cornwell – percussion (6)
- Phyllis Hyman – lead vocals (5)

Music arrangements

- Bo Watson – rhythm and vocal arrangements (1, 2)
- The Whispers – vocal arrangements (2)
- Barry Sarna – rhythm arrangements (3)
- Wardell Potts – vocal arrangements (3)
- Leon Sylvers III – vocal arrangements (3, 9), rhythm arrangements (9)
- Wilmer Raglin – rhythm and vocal arrangements (4)
- Kevin Walker – rhythm arrangements (4)
- John Parrish – string arrangements (5)
- Percy Scott – rhythm arrangements (5)
- Grady Wilkins – rhythm arrangements (5, 7), vocal arrangements (5)
- Larry White – rhythm arrangements (5, 7)
- Kenneth Edmonds – rhythm arrangements (6)
- Nicholas Caldwell – rhythm and vocal arrangements (7)
- Bill Simmons – rhythm arrangements (8)
- Dana Marshall – rhythm arrangements (9)

Production

- The Whispers – executive producers
- Reggie Calloway – producer (1, 2, 6 8)
- Wardell Potts – producer (3)
- Leon Sylvers III – producer (3, 4, 9)
- Wilmer Raglin – producer (4)
- Grady Wilkins – producer (5)
- Nicholas Caldwell – producer (7)
- Taavi Mote – recording (1, 2, 6–8), mixing (6, 8)
- Ric Probet – recording (1, 2, 6, 8"), mixing (1, 2)
- Kirk Ferraioli – recording (3, 4, 9), mixing (3, 4, 9)
- Michael Franks – recording (3, 4), mixing (3, 4)
- Joe Hall – recording (3), mixing (3)
- Lee Cooper – recording (4, 9), mixing (4, 9)
- Wilmer Raglin – recording (4), mixing (4)
- Jim Shifflett – recording (4), mixing (4, 9)
- Kevin Walker – recording (4), mixing (4)
- David Frazer – recording (5, 7)
- Ken Kessie – mixing (5, 7)
- Jim Perkins – recording (9)
- Eddy Schreyer – mastering
- Wally Traugott – mastering
- Capitol Records (Hollywood, California) – mastering location
- Regina Griffey – A&R coordinator
- Carmen Davis – A&R assistant, album concept
- Brenda Patrick – A&R assistant
- Art Sims – art direction, album concept
- Matthew Rolston – photography
- Lalette Littlejohn – make-up
- Ernie Bannales – hair
- Patrice Walters – stylist

== Charts ==
=== Weekly charts ===
Chart (1984–1985)	Peak position
US Billboard 200	88
US Top R&B/Hip-Hop Albums (Billboard)	8

=== Year-end charts ===
Chart (1985)	Position
US Top R&B/Hip-Hop Albums (Billboard)	40

=== Singles ===
Year	Single	Peak position
Year	Single	US R&B
1984	"Contagious"	10
1984	"Some Kinda Lover"	17
1985	"Don t Keep Me Waiting"	60
