= Majestic (musician) =

British musician

Kevin Adam Christie, known professionally as Majestic, is an English musician. His singles "Creeping in the Dark" (with Jungle 70), "Naughty Sesh" (with Tigermonkey), and "Set My Heart on Fire" (with The Jammin Kid and Celine Dion) charted at numbers 75, 52, and 39 on the UK Singles Chart respectively. His remix of Boney M.'s "Rasputin" and cover of Whitney Houston's "Million Dollar Bill" (with Beyond Chicago and Alex Mills) charted at numbers 11 and 67 on the same chart, and his vocals have also been sampled in Skrillex's "Ruffneck (Full Flex)" and Droideka's "Get Hyper", which charted at numbers 89 and 29 respectively. In 2020, his album track "Fresh" with FooR and Dread MC on 2018's Friends of FooR was used in an advertising campaign for Coors Light.

== Life and career ==
Kevin Adam Christie was born and raised in North London. He got his first decks aged twelve after he and his father went to the Loot in Fulham to pick up a pair of Soundlab DLP1s and a citronic mixer. Aged 15, he began MCing at UK garage nights and on local pirate radio; he began producing around the same time, although did not feel his work was good enough for release. In 2005, he released his first single, "Kebab Riddim", before releasing Topgear, an EP, the following year. In 2009, he and Wideboys released "In the Club", a skewering of VIP culture, and in 2011, Skrillex released "Ruffneck (Full Flex)", which sampled Christie's vocals and charted at No. 89 on the UK Singles Chart. In 2013, Droideka's "Get Hyper", which also sampled his vocals, charted at No. 29 on the same chart. In 2014, he released "Creeping in the Dark", a collaboration with Jungle 70, which charted at No. 75 on the UK Singles Chart the following year. He then proceeded to release a number of singles including "Raised in the 90s" and "Hard" and the EP Break the Mould.

In 2016, he released the compilation album Pure House & Garage, and while mixing its sequel, Pure House & Garage, Vol. 2, he released the single "Naughty Sesh", which featured Tigermonkey and charted at No. 52 on the UK Singles Chart, and then another single, "Bad Selection". In June 2019, his single "I Wanna Be Down" charted at No. 40 on the UK Dance Singles Chart. In early 2020, his garage track with FooR and Dread MC, "Fresh", from FooR's 2018 album Friends of FooR featured in an advertising campaign for Coors Light, which sponsored Channel 4's Comedy on 4 segment. As a result, the song entered the UK Singles Sales Chart at No. 80. In 2021, he produced a remix of Boney M.'s "Rasputin", having heard the original many times on TikTok, which Alexis Petridis described in January 2024 as being "wise enough to keep the song almost entirely unchanged". His version went viral on the platform after users began using the song to soundtrack videos of themselves flexing their muscles, prompting the song to chart at No. 11 on the UK Singles Chart. A music video was later released for the song, featuring RuPaul's Drag Race UK alumnus Bimini Bon-Boulash.

In late April 2022, he released "Time to Groove", which featured Nonô and sampled Earth, Wind & Fire's "Let's Groove", which was used in the 27 June broadcast of series eight of Love Island. In May 2022, he featured on Bad Boy Chiller Crew's "Skank All Night (You Wot, You Wot)", which sampled Sandy B's "Make the World Go Round" and was released alongside a music video directed by LG Vision which saw the band interrupt a village working men's club's bingo match. It was later announced that the track would be included on Bad Boy Chiller Crew's November 2023 album Influential. On 23 June 2023, he, Beyond Chicago, and Alex Mills released a cover of Whitney Houston's "Million Dollar Bill", which charted at No. 67 on the UK Singles Chart. In October 2023, he released a remix of Bonnie Tyler's "Total Eclipse of the Heart" in partnership with McVitie's Jaffa Cakes, and in May 2024, he and The Jammin Kid released "Set My Heart on Fire", a mashup of Celine Dion's "I'm Alive" and the Whispers' "And the Beat Goes On", which charted at No. 39 on the UK Singles Chart.
