= Chocolate Girl =

Chocolate Girl may refer to:

- The Chocolate Girl, a 1743 pastel portraits
- The Chocolate Girl, the English language title for the 1909 play La petite chocolatière by Paul Gavault
- The Chocolate Girl (1927 film), a 1927 French silent film directed by René Hervil after the play by Gavault
- The Chocolate Girl (1932 film), a 1932 French comedy film directed by Marc Allégret after the play by Gavault
- The Chocolate Girl (1950 film), a 1950 French musical comedy film directed by André Berthomieu after the play by Gavault
- "Chocolate Girl" (Deacon Blue song), a song on Deacon Blue's 1988 album Raintown
- "Chocolate Girl", a song on The Whispers's 1977 album Open Up Your Love
