= I'm Alive (Celine Dion song) =

2002 song by Celine Dion

Single by Celine Dion

from the album A New Day Has Come
- B-side: "Aun Existe Amor"
- Released: 5 August 2002
- Studio: Piccolo; The Location
- Genre: Pop; dance-pop
- Length: 3:30
- Label: Columbia; Epic
- Songwriters: Kristian Lundin; Andreas Carlsson
- Producer: Kristian Lundin

Celine Dion singles chronology
"A New Day Has Come" (2002)	"I'm Alive" (2002)	"Goodbye's (The Saddest Word)" (2002)

Music video
- "I'm Alive" on YouTube

"I'm Alive" is a song by Canadian singer Celine Dion from her seventh English-language album, A New Day Has Come (2002). It was written by Kristian Lundin and Andreas Carlsson, and produced by Lundin with additional production by Ric Wake and Richie Jones. "I'm Alive" was released as the album's second single on 5 August 2002 by Columbia Records and Epic Records. It was also used in the film Stuart Little 2. The upbeat midtempo track received positive reviews from music critics and became a worldwide hit, reaching the top 10 in many countries. The music video was directed by Dave Meyers.

On 3 May 2024, after a viral mashup of "I'm Alive" and "And the Beat Goes On" by the Jammin Kid on TikTok, English producer Majestic released the song as Set My Heart on Fire (I'm Alive x And the Beat Goes On), credited to him, the Jammin Kid, and Dion. On 31 May 2024, the Jammin Kid's original version was also released, followed by the Majestic VIP mix on 14 June 2024. "Set My Heart on Fire" reached number one in Quebec and number 39 in the United Kingdom.

== Background and release ==
While working on the album, Dion commented:

"I couldn't wait to go back into the recording studio. And, I loved the songs that people wrote for me on this album. Those songs became even closer to me because, the fact that I took two years off, they wrote songs for me that were even closer to my emotions. I had things to talk about. I had things to sing about. It was a fun adventure, no pressure, relaxed, smooth, powerful but controlled. I really had a wonderful time. And to see my friends again, it was great".

"I'm Alive" was commercially released on 5 August 2002 as the album's second single. For radio, the track was reworked by Humberto Gatica. His mix appeared on the Stuart Little 2 soundtrack and on promotional and commercial CD singles.

Although the album version of "I'm Alive" was included on My Love: Essential Collection in October 2008, a new remix by Laurent Wolf was issued in France to promote the compilation. In January 2009, additional promotional remixes were created by Maurice Joshua for US clubs.

== Composition ==
"I'm Alive" (2002)
A 21-second sample of "I'm Alive".

"I'm Alive" was written by Kristian Lundin and Andreas Carlsson and produced by Lundin. They had previously collaborated with Dion on her 1999 hit "That's the Way It Is". Additional production was provided by Ric Wake and Richie Jones. It is a midtempo track in which Dion declares she is alive, fulfilled as a mother, and in love. The song has been described as pop and dance-pop, beginning as a ballad before shifting into an "uplifting uptempo song about the joy of motherhood".

The song is written in the key of E♭ major with a moderate tempo of 104 beats per minute. Dion's vocals span from A♭_{3} to D_{5}. At approximately the two-minute-and-forty-five-second mark, the song modulates up a whole step to the key of F major.

== Critical reception ==
"I'm Alive" received positive reviews from music critics, who praised its upbeat tone and strong vocal performance. While reviewing the Stuart Little 2 soundtrack, William Ruhlmann of AllMusic wrote that "Dion occupies the position taken by Trisha Yearwood on the soundtrack to Stuart Little in 1999, singing an upbeat rhythm number". Another AllMusic editor, Stephen Thomas Erlewine, described the track as uplifting and singled it out; in his album review, he called it a "hitworthy uptempo gem". ABC's RollerCoaster review was also positive, stating that "this is the type of music you play in the background when you're having a good laugh with friends or a nice tea with family. It's the kind of song you sing along to and slowly get wrapped in it".

Chuck Taylor from Billboard wrote that "I'm Alive" marks a stylistic "left turn, with its throbbing tribal rhythms and a loose, sky-grazing vocal from Dion". He added that the "percolating" Humberto Gatica mix "adds juice" to the album version, while the uptempo Wake Up mix, created with Ric Wake and Richie Jones, is Dion's most "inspired and festive" remix to date, weaving Blondie's "Heart of Glass" into the beat to "splendid effect".

Neal Sky of Pop Dirt called the track a "bubblegum-radio-song". Sal Cinquemani of Slant Magazine named it one of "the album's standout tracks", calling it "an uplifting midtempo number". Christopher Smith from TalkAboutPopMusic wrote that Dion is "full of energy and blasting her way forward with confidence is the order of the day". He added that it "could almost be declared as her signature, biographical anthem, if it were not for all those mega hits of the 90s".

== Commercial performance ==
The song was successful, reaching number two on the European Hot 100 Singles. It also peaked at number two in Belgium, number four in Germany and Portugal, number five in Austria and Sweden, and number seven in France, Switzerland, Denmark, Greece, and the Netherlands. In the United Kingdom, "I'm Alive" reached number 17. It was certified double platinum in Canada, platinum in the United Kingdom and Belgium, and gold in France, Germany, and Denmark. The song also topped the airplay charts in Poland, Czech Republic, and Romania.

In Australia and New Zealand, it reached numbers 30 and 35, respectively, and it was certified platinum in New Zealand.

In North America, "I'm Alive" was released as a promotional single and entered radio charts. In Canada, it peaked at number one on the Adult Contemporary chart and number nine on the overall radio chart. In the United States, it reached number six on the Adult Contemporary chart and number 11 on the Bubbling Under Hot 100. The 2009 remix by Maurice Joshua reached number 35 on the Dance Club Songs chart. According to Billboard, "I'm Alive" has accumulated over 49.5 million on-demand streams in the US as of November 2019, making it Dion's ninth most streamed song in the country.

== Live performances ==
Dion performed "I'm Alive" during her show A New Day... at Caesars Palace, Las Vegas. The performance was included on the A New Day... Live in Las Vegas CD in 2004 and the Live in Las Vegas - A New Day... DVD in 2007. The song was also part of the Taking Chances World Tour setlist, where Dion performed a new remixed version.

An acoustic arrangement was added to the setlist of Dion's Las Vegas residency show in 2015, and the original version returned during the final year of the residency. "I'm Alive" was also performed on her 2017 European tour, 2018 tour, and the Courage World Tour. On 5 July 2019, Dion performed "I'm Alive" during her BST Hyde Park concert in London.

== Music video ==
The music video was directed by Dave Meyers between 24–25 May 2002 and premiered in June 2002. Two versions were created: one including scenes from Stuart Little 2 and one without them. The version without film footage used altered shots from the plane sequences but replaced the CGI model of the plane.

== Formats and track listing ==
- Australian CD single
1. "I'm Alive" (album version) – 3:30
2. "I'm Alive" (the Wake up mix) – 3:06
3. "I'm Alive" (Humberto Gatica mix) – 3:28
4. "Aun Existe Amor" – 3:52
- European CD single
1. "I'm Alive" (Humberto Gatica mix) – 3:28
2. "I'm Alive" (Johnny Rocks rhythm radio edit) – 3:36
- European CD maxi-single
1. "I'm Alive" (Humberto Gatica mix) – 3:28
2. "I'm Alive" (Johnny Rocks rhythm radio edit) – 3:36
3. "Aun Existe Amor" – 3:52
4. "I'm Alive" (Joe Bermudez club mix) – 7:41
5. "A New Day Has Come" (video) – 3:28
- UK cassette single
1. "I'm Alive" (Humberto Gatica mix) – 3:28
2. "Aun Existe Amor" – 3:52
3. "I'm Alive" (Johnny Rocks rhythm radio edit) – 3:36
- UK CD single #1
1. "I'm Alive" (Humberto Gatica mix) – 3:28
2. "Aun Existe Amor" – 3:52
3. "A New Day Has Come" (video) – 3:28
- UK CD single #2
1. "I'm Alive" (album version) – 3:30
2. "I'm Alive" (Humberto Gatica mix) – 3:28
3. "I'm Alive" (Johnny Rocks rhythm radio edit) – 3:36
4. "I'm Alive" (Joe Bermudez radio edit) – 4:25

== Remixes ==
=== 2002 remixes ===
1. "I'm Alive" (Humberto Gatica mix) – 3:28
2. "I'm Alive" (Joe Bermudez radio edit) – 4:25
3. "I'm Alive" (Joe Bermudez club mix) – 7:41
4. "I'm Alive" (Johnny Rocks rhythm radio edit) – 3:36
5. "I'm Alive" (Johnny Rocks world anthem remix) – 10:47
6. "I'm Alive" (the Wake up mix) – 3:06

=== 2008–2009 remixes ===
1. "I'm Alive" (Laurent Wolf remix) – 3:56
2. "I'm Alive" (Maurice Joshua radio edit) – 3:14
3. "I'm Alive" (Maurice Joshua vocal) – 7:41
4. "I'm Alive" (Maurice Joshua dub) – 7:41

== Charts ==
=== Weekly charts ===
Weekly chart performance
Chart (2002–2009)	Peak position
Australia (ARIA)	30
Austria (Ö3 Austria Top 40)	5
Belgium (Ultratop 50 Flanders)	2
Belgium (Ultratop 50 Wallonia)	2
Canada (Nielsen SoundScan) Import-only single	21
Canada Radio (Nielsen BDS)	9
Canada AC (Nielsen BDS)	1
Canada CHR/Top 40 (Nielsen BDS)	27
Croatia International Airplay (Top lista)	3
Czech Republic (Rádio Top 50)	1
Denmark (Tracklisten)	7
Europe (European Hot 100 Singles)	2
Finland (Suomen virallinen lista)	13
France (SNEP)	7
Germany (GfK)	4
Greece (IFPI)	7
Hungary (Rádiós Top 40)	15
Hungary (Single Top 40)	14
Ireland (IRMA)	22
Italy (FIMI)	25
Netherlands (Dutch Top 40)	23
Netherlands (Single Top 100)	7
New Zealand (Recorded Music NZ)	35
Norway (VG-lista)	22
Poland (National Airplay Chart)	1
Portugal (AFP)	4
Quebec Radio Songs (ADISQ)	2
Romania (Romanian Top 100)	1
Scottish Singles Sales (Official Charts)	9
Spain (Promusicae)	20
Sweden (Sverigetopplistan)	5
Switzerland (Schweizer Hitparade)	7
UK Singles (Official Charts)	17
UK Airplay (Music Week)	44
US Bubbling Under Hot 100 (Billboard)	11
US Adult Contemporary (Billboard)	6
US Dance Club Songs (Billboard)	35

=== Year-end charts ===
Year-end chart performance
Chart (2002)	Position
Austria (Ö3 Austria Top 40)	38
Belgium (Ultratop 50 Flanders)	6
Belgium (Ultratop 50 Wallonia)	33
Canada Radio (Nielsen BDS)	76
Europe (European Hot 100 Singles)	20
France (SNEP)	39
Germany (Media Control)	22
Netherlands (Dutch Top 40)	117
Netherlands (Single Top 100)	49
Sweden (Hitlistan)	53
Switzerland (Schweizer Hitparade)	41
US Adult Contemporary (Billboard)	20

== Certifications ==
Certifications
Region	Certification	Certified units/sales
Belgium (BRMA)	Platinum	50,000^{*}
Canada (Music Canada)	2× Platinum	160,000^{‡}
Denmark (IFPI Danmark)	Gold	45,000^{‡}
France (SNEP)	Gold	250,000^{*}
Germany (BVMI)	Gold	250,000^{‡}
New Zealand (RMNZ)	Platinum	30,000^{‡}
United Kingdom (BPI)	Platinum	600,000^{‡}
^{*} Sales figures based on certification alone.^{‡} Sales+streaming figures based on certification alone.

== Release history ==
Release history
Region	Date	Format	Label	Ref.
Denmark	5 August 2002	CD	Columbia	
Europe	12 August 2002	CD	Columbia	
United Kingdom	19 August 2002	Cassette; CD	Epic	
Australia	19 August 2002	CD	Epic	

== "Set My Heart on Fire (I'm Alive x And the Beat Goes On)" ==
"Set My Heart on Fire (I'm Alive x And the Beat Goes On)"

Single by Majestic, the Jammin Kid, and Celine Dion
- Released: 3 May 2024
- Length: 2:59
- Label: Columbia
- Songwriters: Kristian Lundin; Andreas Carlsson; Leon Sylvers III; Stephen Shockley; William Shelby
- Producers: Majestic; Lee Tyler

Celine Dion singles chronology
"Courage" (2019)	"Set My Heart on Fire (I'm Alive x And the Beat Goes On)" (2024)	"Hymne à l'amour" (2024)

Audio
- "Set My Heart on Fire" on YouTube

"Set My Heart on Fire (I'm Alive x And the Beat Goes On)" is a 2024 single by English producer Majestic, the Jammin Kid, and Canadian singer Celine Dion. Released on 3 May 2024, the track originated from a viral mashup on TikTok that combined Dion's 2002 song "I'm Alive" with "And the Beat Goes On" by The Whispers. Following the success of the mashup, several additional versions were issued: the Jammin Kid's original edit on 31 May 2024, the Majestic VIP mix on 14 June 2024, and the Jess Bays remix on 19 July 2024.

=== Commercial performance ===
"Set My Heart on Fire" reached number one on the Quebec Digital Song Sales chart and peaked at number 39 in the United Kingdom. It was certified silver by the BPI.

=== Formats and track listing ===
- Digital and streaming single
1. "Set My Heart on Fire (I'm Alive x And the Beat Goes On)" – 2:59
2. "Set My Heart on Fire (I'm Alive x And the Beat Goes On)" [The Jammin Kid mash-up] – 2:36
3. "Set My Heart on Fire (I'm Alive x And the Beat Goes On)" [Majestic VIP mix] – 3:09
4. "Set My Heart on Fire (I'm Alive x And the Beat Goes On)" [Jess Bays remix] – 2:36

=== Charts ===
Chart performance
Chart (2024)	Peak position
Australia Club Tracks (ARIA)	28
Ireland (IRMA)	92
Lithuania Airplay (TopHit)	180
Quebec Digital Song Sales (ADISQ)	1
Quebec Radio Songs (ADISQ)	2
Romania Airplay (TopHit)	17
UK Singles (Official Charts)	39
UK Dance (Official Charts)	7
US Dance/Electronic Digital Song Sales (Billboard)	5

=== Certifications ===
Certifications
Region	Certification	Certified units/sales
United Kingdom (BPI)	Silver	200,000^{‡}
^{‡} Sales+streaming figures based on certification alone.

=== Release history ===
Release history
Region	Date	Format	Version	Label	Ref.
Various	3 May 2024	Digital download; streaming	Original	Columbia	
Various	31 May 2024	Digital download; streaming	The Jammin Kid mash-up	Columbia	
Various	14 June 2024	Digital download; streaming	Majestic VIP mix	Columbia	
Various	19 July 2024	Digital download; streaming	Jess Bays remix	Columbia	

== See also ==
- List of Romanian Top 100 number ones
