= More of the Night =

Studio album by the Whispers
- Released: February 6, 1990
- Recorded: October 1989 – January 1990
- Studios: Skip Saylor Recording (Los Angeles, California); Ameraycan Studios (North Hollywood, California); M'Bila Studios (Hollywood, California); Larrabee West (West Hollywood, California); Aire L.A. Studios (Glendale, California); Cheshire Studios (Atlanta, Georgia)
- Genres: Dance-pop, soul, R&B, new jack swing
- Length: 71:57
- Label: Capitol
- Producers: Joel Davis; Gary Taylor; Gordon Jones; Robert Brookins; Sir Gant; Peabo Bryson; Tsuyoshi "Taka" Takayanagi; Kevin Spencer; Zack Harmon & Christopher Troy; Steve Russell; Greg Dalton; Robert "The Riddler" Harris; Skylark; Jerry McNeil

The Whispers chronology
Just Gets Better with Time (1987)	More of the Night (1990)	Toast to the Ladies (1995)

Professional ratings
Review scores
Source	Rating
AllMusic	4.5/5 stars
Select	3/5 medals

More of the Night is the fifteenth studio album by American R&B/soul group the Whispers. It was released on February 6, 1990, as the follow-up to their massively successful 1987 album, Just Gets Better with Time. While it did not sell quite as well as its predecessor, More of the Night did include several hits, including three R&B top 10 tunes: "My Heart Your Heart," "Innocent," and "Is it Good to You." The album went gold in the United States and would spend 49 cumulative weeks on the Top Black Albums chart, two weeks longer than Just Gets Better with Time. It was the last album to feature founding member Marcus Hutson who left the group in 1992.

Written by Gary Taylor, "My Heart Your Heart" was originally performed in 1988 by Taylor himself, with exactly the same musical backing and arrangement used here, and appeared as a bonus track on his Compassion album. Taylor actually produced the version by The Whispers, who turned it into a big hit.

== Track listing (compact disc) ==
1. "More of the Night" (Joel Davis) - 6:02
2. "My Heart Your Heart" (Gary Taylor) - 5:19
3. "Mind Blowing" (Robert Brookins, Gordon P. Jones, Dianne Quander) - 4:55
4. "Don't Be Late for Love" (Rick Ferguson, Tony Lindsay, Damon Jenkins, Peabo Bryson) - 5:12
5. "You Are the One" (Joel Davis) - 5:26
6. "Is It Good to You" (Tsuyoshi "Taka" Takayanagi, Kevin Spencer) - 6:16
7. "Innocent" (Brookins, Jones, King) - 5:16
8. "Girl Don't Make Me Wait" (Zack Harmon, Christopher Troy) - 4:26
9. "Misunderstanding" (Steve Russell, Rodney Benford) - 5:48
10. "Forever Lover" (Greg Dalton) - 4:49
11. "Babes" (The Riddler, Calvin Romance) (4:14)
12. "I Want 2B the 1 4U" (Skylark) - 4:06
13. "Help Them See the Light" (Jerry McNeil) - 5:24
14. "Innocent" (Heat of the Heat Edit) (Robert Brookins, Gordon P. Jones, Marva King) - 4:37

== Track listing (cassette) ==
Side One: Dancin

1. "Innocent" (Brookins, Jones, King) - 5:16
2. "Girl Don't Make Me Wait" (Zack Harmon, Christopher Troy) - 4:26
3. "Misunderstanding" (Steve Russell, Rodney Benford) - 5:48
4. "Forever Lover" (Greg Dalton) - 4:49
5. "Babes" (The Riddler, Calvin Romance) - 4:14
6. "I Want 2B the 1 4U" (Skylark) - 4:06
7. "Innocent" (Heat of the Heat Edit) (Robert Brookins, Gordon P. Jones, Marva King) - 4:37

Side Two: Romancin

1. "More of the Night" (Joel Davis) - 6:02
2. "My Heart Your Heart" (Gary Taylor) - 5:19
3. "Mind Blowing" (Robert Brookins, Gordon P. Jones, Dianne Quander) - 4:55
4. "Don't Be Late for Love" (Ferguson, Lindsay, Jenkins, Bryson) - 5:12
5. "You Are the One" (Joel Davis) - 5:26
6. "Is It Good to You" (Tsuyoshi "Taka" Takayanagi, Kevin Spencer) - 6:16
7. "Help Them See the Light" (Jerry McNeil) - 5:24

== Track listing (vinyl) ==
- The vinyl version of More of the Night had a radically different track listing with songs in a different order and five songs that only appeared on the cassette and compact disc formats.

1. "Innocent" (Brookins, Jones, King) - 5:16
2. "Girl Don't Make Me Wait" (Zack Harmon, Christopher Troy) - 4:26
3. "Misunderstanding" (Steve Russell, Rodney Benford) - 5:48
4. "Forever Lover" (Greg Dalton) - 4:49
5. "Babes" (The Riddler, Calvin Romance) - 4:14
6. "More of the Night" (Joel Davis) - 6:02
7. "My Heart Your Heart" (Gary Taylor) - 5:19
8. "Mind Blowing" (Robert Brookins, Jones, Dianne Quander) - 4:55
9. "Is It Good to You" (Tsuyoshi "Taka" Takayanagi, Kevin Spencer) - 6:16

== Personnel ==
Credits taken from CD release.

The Whispers

- Nicholas Caldwell – backing vocals (1–3, 5–13), vocals (14)
- Leaveil Degree – backing vocals (1–3, 5–13)
- Marcus Hutton – backing vocals (1–3, 5–13), vocals (14)
- Wallace "Scotty" Scott – lead vocals (1–13), backing vocals (1–3, 5–13), vocals (14)
- Walter Scott – backing vocals (1–3, 5–13), lead vocals (8–10), vocals (14)

Musicians and additional vocalists

- Joel Davis – keyboards (1, 5), keyboard programming (1, 5), strings (1, 5), bass (1, 5), drum programming (1, 5), drums (5)
- Gary Taylor – keyboard programming (1, 2), keyboards (2), bass synthesizer (2), drum programming (2)
- Robert Brookins – keyboard programming (3, 7, 14), strings (3, 7, 14), drum programming (3, 7, 14), keyboards (7, 14)
- Gordon Jones – keyboards (3, 7, 14), keyboard programming (3), strings (3), bass synthesizer (3, 7, 14), drum programming (3, 7), guitar synthesizer (7, 14)
- Dean "Sir" Gant – keyboards (4), keyboard programming (4), bass (4), drums (4), drum programming (4), percussion (4)
- Tsuyoshi Takayanagi – keyboards (6), keyboard programming (6), strings (6), bass (6), drums (6), drum programming (6)
- Zack Harmon – keyboards (8), strings (8), guitars (8), drum programming (8), percussion (8)
- Christopher Troy – keyboards (8), keyboard programming (8), strings (8), bass (8), drum programming (8), percussion (8)
- Chuckii Booker – acoustic piano solo (9)
- Dwayne McGhee – acoustic piano (9), keyboard programming (9)
- Steve Russell – keyboards (9), bass (9), drums (9), drum programming (9), percussion (9)
- James "D.C." Wilson – bass synthesizer solo (9)
- Greg Dalton – keyboards (10), keyboard programming (10), bass (10), drums (10), drum programming (10), sequencing (10)
- Robert "The Riddler" Harris Jr. – keyboards (11), keyboard programming (11), bass (11), drums (11), drum programming (11), percussion (11)
- Conley Abrams – additional synthesizer programming (12)
- Jerry McNeil – keyboards (13), keyboard programming (13), strings (13), bass synthesizer (13), drum programming (13), percussion (13)
- Gene Robinson – guitars (1, 5)
- Paul Jackson Jr. – rhythm guitar (4), guitars (12)
- Henry Johnson – guitar solo (4)
- Skylark – drum programming (1, 5, 12), keyboard programming (12), strings (12), bass synthesizer (12), Akai MPC60 (12)
- Leon Ndugu Chancler – cymbals (4)
- Donnell Spencer – drum programming (6)
- Keith Robinson – percussion (1, 5)
- Gerald Albright – saxophone (6, 13)
- Alex Brown – backing vocals (4)
- Keni Burke – backing vocals (4)
- Carl Caldwell – backing vocals (4)
- Marlena Jeter – backing vocals (4)
- Marva King – backing vocals (4)
- Portia Griffin – backing vocals (7, 14)
- Vernell Shaw – backing vocals (8)
- Timmy Gatling – bass boom (9)

Music arrangements

- Joel Davis – rhythm, string and vocal arrangements (1, 5)
- Odeen Mays – BGV arrangements (1)
- Gary Taylor – rhythm and string arrangements (2)
- Robert Brookins – rhythm, string and vocal arrangements (3, 7)
- Gordon Jones – rhythm arrangements (3, 7), string arrangements (3), vocal arrangements (7)
- Eric Bryce – guitar arrangements (5)
- Gene Robinson – guitar arrangements (5)
- Kevin Spencer – vocal arrangements (6)
- Tsuyoshi Takayanagi – rhythm and string arrangements (6)
- Zack Harmon – rhythm, string and vocal arrangements (8)
- Christopher Troy – rhythm, string and vocal arrangements (8)
- Steve Russell – rhythm and vocal arrangements (9)
- Greg Dalton – rhythm and vocal arrangements (10)
- Robert "The Riddler" Harris Jr. – rhythm and vocal arrangements (11)
- Skylark – rhythm, string and vocal arrangements (12)
- Jerry McNeil – rhythm, string and vocal arrangements (13)
- Gerald Albright – saxophone arrangements (13)

== Production ==
- The Whispers – executive producers
- Herb Trawick – co-executive producer (11)
- Joel Davis – producer (1, 5)
- Gary Taylor – producer (2)
- Robert Brookins – producer (3, 7, 14)
- Gordon Jones – co-producer (3, 7, 14)
- Peabo Bryson – producer (4)
- Sir Gant – producer (4)
- Kevin Spencer – producer (6)
- Tsuyoshi Takayanagi – producer (6)
- Zack Harmon – producer (8)
- Christopher Troy – producer (8)
- Steve Russell – producer (9)
- Greg Dalton – producer (10)
- Robert "The Riddler" Harris Jr. – producer (11)
- Skylark – producer (12)
- Jerry McNeil – producer (13)
- Keith Cohen – additional production (14)
- Phyliss E. Parker – production coordinator
- Grady Wilkins – vocal consultant
- Jeffrey Fey – art direction
- Tommy Steele – art direction
- Curry Design, Inc. – design
- Todd Gray – photography
- Michael Gardner – management

Technical credits

- Wally Traugott – mastering at Capitol Records (Hollywood, California)
- Fil Brown – engineer (1, 2, 5, 6), mixing (2)
- Taavi Mote – mixing (1, 5, 12)
- Mitch Gibson – engineer (3, 7)
- Jeff Lorenzen – mixing (3, 7)
- Craig Burbidge – engineer (4), mixing (6, 8–11, 13)
- Steve Halquist – engineer (4, 13), mixing (4)
- Thom Kidd – engineer (4)
- Jim Shifflett – engineer (6)
- Jared Held – engineer (7)
- David Koenig – engineer (8–11)
- Dave Rideau – engineer (11)
- Conley Abrams – engineer (12)
- Keith Cohen – mixing (14)
- Matt Hyde – assistant engineer (1), overdubbing (5), engineer (13)
- Joe Shay – assistant engineer (1, 5, 11, 13), engineer (6)
- Ross Donaldson – assistant engineer (2, 13)
- Scott Weatherspoon – assistant engineer (3)
- Anthony Jeffries – mix assistant (7, 8, 10–12), assistant engineer (9–11)
- Gregg Barrett – assistant engineer (8, 10), mix assistant (9)
- Michael Scottella – assistant engineer (12)
- Kimm James – assistant engineer (14)

== Charts ==
=== Weekly charts ===
Chart (1990)	Peak position
US Billboard 200	83
US Top R&B/Hip-Hop Albums (Billboard)	8

=== Year-end charts ===
Chart (1990)	Position
US Top R&B/Hip-Hop Albums (Billboard)	54
Chart (1991)	Position
US Top R&B/Hip-Hop Albums (Billboard)	37
