= Nude as the News =

Single by Cat Power

from the album What Would the Community Think
- B-side: "Schizophrenia's Weighted Me Down"
- Released: December 12, 1996
- Genre: Alternative rock, punk blues, southern gothic
- Label: Matador Records; OLE-240 (Europe only); OLE-202 (Europe only)
- Songwriter: Chan Marshall

Cat Power singles chronology
"Headlights" (1993)	"Nude as the News" (1996)	"He War" (2003)

"Nude as the News" is a song by the American singer/songwriter Cat Power (a.k.a. Chan Marshall). It is the fourth song on her 1996 album, What Would the Community Think. It was released as a single, and a music video shot entirely in black and white and directed by Brett Vapnek.

A review in Vulture called the song both eerie and propulsive, saying that "it rolls like a long snarl." The song is autobiographical, telling the story of an abortion that Marshall had when she was twenty. The chorus lyric, "Jackson, Jesse, I've got a son in me", does not refer to the Reverend Jesse Jackson but rather the first names of the children of Patti Smith, one of Marshall's heroes.

The B-side "Schizophrenia's Weighted Me Down" is a composite of the two songs "Schizophrenia" by Sonic Youth and "Weighted Down (The Prison Song)" by Skip Spence.

== Track listing ==
1. "Nude as the News" (Chan Marshall) – 4:23
2. "Schizophrenia's Weighted Me Down" – 2:49

"Schizophrenia" written by Thurston Moore
"Weighted Down (The Prison Song)" written by Alexander Spence
