= Keep On Lovin' Me =

1983 single by The Whispers

Single by The Whispers

from the album Love for Love
- Released: 1983
- Genre: R&B; boogie; dance; funk
- Length: 5:50
- Label: SOLAR
- Songwriters: Wardell Potts Jr; Kevin Spencer; William Zimmerman
- Producers: Leon Sylvers III; Ricky Sylvers

The Whispers singles chronology
"Tonight" (1983)	"Keep On Lovin' Me" (1983)	"This Time" (1983)

Music video
- "Keep on Lovin’ Me" on YouTube

"Keep On Lovin' Me" is a song recorded by American rhythm and blues group The Whispers; issued as the second single from their fourteenth studio album Love for Love. The song peaked at No. 4 on the Billboard R&B singles chart in 1983.

The music video was filmed in West Hollywood and Downtown Los Angeles.

== Charts ==
Chart performance for "Keep on Lovin’ Me"
Chart (1983)	Peak position
US Dance Club Songs (Billboard)	18
US Hot R&B/Hip-Hop Songs (Billboard)	4
