= List of Billboard number-one R&B albums of 1980 =

These are the Billboard magazine R&B albums that have reached number one in 1980.

== Chart history ==
Issue date	Album	Artist
January 5	Off the Wall	Michael Jackson
January 12	Off the Wall	Michael Jackson
January 19	Off the Wall	Michael Jackson
January 26	Off the Wall	Michael Jackson
February 2	Off the Wall	Michael Jackson
February 9	Off the Wall	Michael Jackson
February 16	Off the Wall	Michael Jackson
February 23	The Whispers	The Whispers
March 1	The Whispers	The Whispers
March 8	The Whispers	The Whispers
March 15	The Whispers	The Whispers
March 22	The Whispers	The Whispers
March 29	The Whispers	The Whispers
April 5	The Whispers	The Whispers
April 12	The Whispers	The Whispers
April 19	Light Up the Night	The Brothers Johnson
April 26	Light Up the Night	The Brothers Johnson
May 3	Go All the Way	The Isley Brothers
May 10	Go All the Way	The Isley Brothers
May 17	Go All the Way	The Isley Brothers
May 24	Go All the Way	The Isley Brothers
May 31	Go All the Way	The Isley Brothers
June 7	Let’s Get Serious	Jermaine Jackson
June 14	Let’s Get Serious	Jermaine Jackson
June 21	Let’s Get Serious	Jermaine Jackson
June 28	Let’s Get Serious	Jermaine Jackson
July 5	Let’s Get Serious	Jermaine Jackson
July 12	Cameosis	Cameo
July 19	Cameosis	Cameo
July 26	diana	Diana Ross
August 2	diana	Diana Ross
August 9	diana	Diana Ross
August 16	diana	Diana Ross
August 23	diana	Diana Ross
August 30	diana	Diana Ross
September 6	diana	Diana Ross
September 13	diana	Diana Ross
September 20	Give Me the Night	George Benson
September 27	Give Me the Night	George Benson
October 4	Give Me the Night	George Benson
October 11	Give Me the Night	George Benson
October 18	Love Approach	Tom Browne
October 25	Zapp	Zapp
November 1	Zapp	Zapp
November 8	Triumph	The Jacksons
November 15	Triumph	The Jacksons
November 22	Hotter Than July	Stevie Wonder
November 29	Hotter Than July	Stevie Wonder
December 6	Hotter Than July	Stevie Wonder
December 13	Hotter Than July	Stevie Wonder
December 20	Hotter Than July	Stevie Wonder
December 27	Hotter Than July	Stevie Wonder

== See also ==
- 1980 in music
- R&B number-one hits of 1980 (USA)
