= Gary Taylor (singer) =

American singer-songwriter

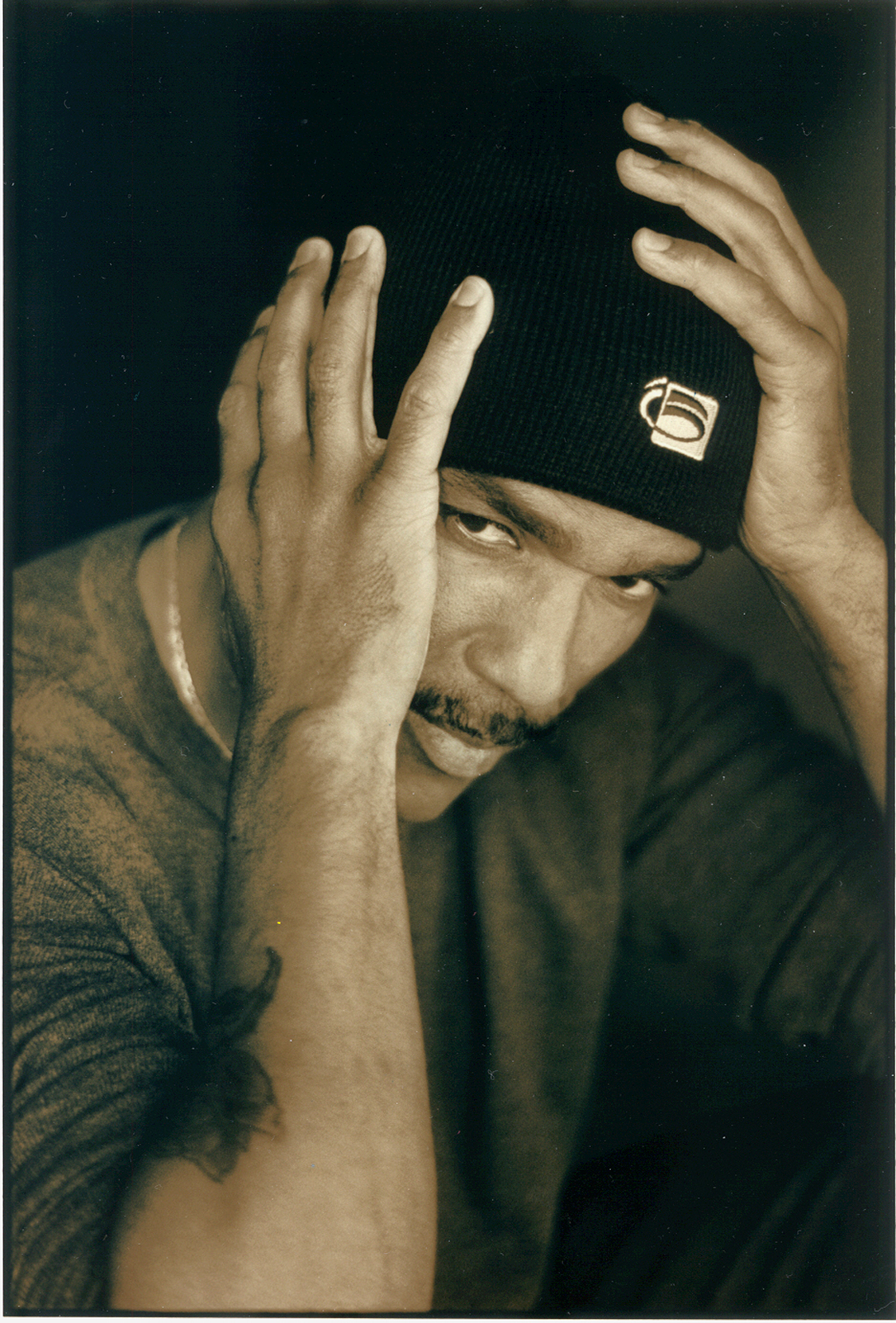

Background information
- Born: Gary Anthony Taylor; Los Angeles, California
- Genre: R&B
- Occupations: Singer, songwriter, producer
- Instruments: Vocals, keyboards, & synths
- Years active: 1980–present
- Labels: A&M, Virgin, Morning Crew Records, Expansion, Valley Vue
- Website: www.morningcrew.com

Gary Anthony Taylor (born June 4, 1953 in Los Angeles, California) is an American singer, songwriter, multi-instrumentalist and producer, whose songs have been recorded by a number of leading artists.

== Career ==
As a background vocalist, Taylor appeared on The Whispers' R&B #1 "Rock Steady," and "My Flame" for Vanessa Williams, as well as with Nancy Wilson.

As a songwriter and producer, Taylor has worked with both veteran acts, such as Anita Baker ("Good Love") and The Whispers ("Just Gets Better With Time," "My Heart, Your Heart"), and a new wave of soul artists such as Lalah Hathaway ("I'm Coming Back") among them.

Taylor has also released several solo studio albums, starting with his debut album G.T., released in 1983.

Taylor is the cousin of songwriter and producer Skip Scarborough. He covered the Scarborough-penned single for The Emotions, "Don't Ask My Neighbors" on his 1988 album, Compassion.

== Discography ==
Solo albums

Year	Album & record label
1983	G.T., A&M
2011	G.T., PTG
1988	Compassion, Virgin, 10
2002	Compassion, Morning Crew
1990	Take Control, Expansion
1991	Take Control, Valley Vue
1994	Take Control, Morning Crew
1993	Square One, Morning Crew, Expansion
1995	The Mood of Midnight, Morning Crew
1995	One Day at a Time, Expansion
1998	Love Dance, Morning Crew
2001	Under the Nightlight, Morning Crew, Expansion
2003	Eclectic Bohemian, Morning Crew
2006	Retro Blackness, Morning Crew
2024	From the Vault of the 80's, Morning Crew

== Songwriting ==
Song	Recorded by
"Giving You All My Love" (Co-writer Steven Ivory)	Platypus, 1980
"You Got The Stuff"	Executive, 1981
"Do It To Me Baby"	Michael Wycoff, 1983
"On the Line"	Michael Wycoff, 1983
"Don't Say No"	Beau Williams, 1984
"Do Me Right"	Joyce Kennedy, 1985
"Let's Talk"	Carl Anderson, 1985
"A Thousand Miles"	Joe Simon, 1985
"If Only You Were In My Shoes"	Dazz Band, 1985
"I Like My Body"	Chico DeBarge, 1986
"Just Gets Better With Time"	Alfie Silas, 1985; The Whispers, 1987
"I'm Coming Back"	Vesta Williams, 1986; Lalah Hathaway, 1990; Domo Genesis, 2016
"Keep In Touch"	The Controllers, 1987; Grover Washington Jr., 1987
"Good Love"	Anita Baker, 1988; Walter Beasley, 1989; Lonnie Liston Smith, 1991; George Clinton & The P-Funk Allstars, 1997; Alto Reed, 1997; Groove Junkies feat. Indeya, 2020
"I Won't Stop"	The Manhattans, 1989; Will Downing, 2009
"My Heart Your Heart"	The Whispers, 1990
"You Are My Heart"	The Mac Band, 1990
"All or Nothing At All"	The Mac Band, 1990
"Think About Me"	The Mac Band, 1990
"Love U 2 The Limit"	The Mac Band, 1990
"I'm No Stranger"	The Mac Band, 1990; Carl Anderson, 1992
"Love Stories"	Jennifer Holliday, 1991
"Square One"	Ray Parker Jr., 1991
"Your Love"	The Prodigy, 1992
"Living Without A Heart"	Rodney Mannsfield, 1993; Vanessa Rubin, 2019
"Rest My Lips"	Walter & Scotty, 1993
"Stressed Out"	A Tribe Called Quest 1996
"Move On You"	All City, 1998
"Rhythm of My Mind"	Kashif, 1998
"You Take Me Places"	Rebbie Jackson, 1998
"No Me Without You"	Double Scale, 1999
"Without You In My Life"	Marlena Shaw, 2000
"More to Me"	Doc Powell, 2004
"Christmas Love and You"	Will Downing, 2004
"Moon Over Carolina"	Najee, 2009
"Something Special"	Will Downing. 2009
"Let's Make It Now"	Will Downing, 2009
"Consensual"	Will Downing, 2010
"Fly Higher"	Will Downing, 2010
"Shades"	Will Downing, 2010
"Only One"	Will Downing, 2012
"The Blessing"	Will Downing, 2013
"Sexy"	Will Downing, 2013
"Never Find Another Love"	Will Downing, 2013
