= Imagination (The Whispers album) =

Studio album by the Whispers
- Released: November 30, 1980
- Recorded: July–October 1980
- Studios: Studio Masters, Los Angeles
- Genres: Soul, boogie, funk, R&B, disco
- Length: 42:13
- Label: SOLAR
- Producers: The Whispers, Dick Griffey, Leon Sylvers III

The Whispers chronology
The Whispers (1979)	Imagination (1980)	This Kind of Lovin' (1981)

Professional ratings
Review scores
Source	Rating
AllMusic	4/5 stars

Imagination is the tenth studio album by American R&B/soul vocal group the Whispers, released on November 30, 1980, by SOLAR Records.

== Overview ==
The album contains two singles which made the U.S. Hot R&B charts: "It's a Love Thing", which peaked at number two in early 1981; and "I Can Make it Better". Both singles were produced by SOLAR Records' main in-house producer Leon F. Sylvers III. Also featured in the album is "Up on Soul Train", the theme song used on the syndicated television series Soul Train from 1980 to 1983; it was composed by the creator, producer, and host of Soul Train, Don Cornelius.

The music video to the single "It's a Love Thing" is notable for having an early appearance from then-unknown actress Daphne Maxwell Reid. As of September 2016, the song appears in a L'Oreal commercial for Preference Mousse Absolue.

== Track listing ==
1. "Imagination" (Larry White, Grady Wilkins) - 6:15
2. "It's a Love Thing" (Dana Meyers, William Shelby) - 5:10
3. "Say You (Would Love for Me Too)" (Nicholas Caldwell) - 5:03
4. "Continental Shuffle" (Mark Adam Wood, Jr.) - 4:34
5. "I Can Make It Better" (Meyers, Shelby, Stephen Shockley) - 7:14
6. "Girl I Need You" (White, Wilkins) - 4:18
7. "Up on Soul Train" (Don Cornelius) - 5:18
8. "Fantasy" (Werner Schuchner, Ahaguna Sun) - 4:21

== Personnel ==
- Wallace "Scotty" Scott, Walter Scott: lead vocals (tenor)
- Leaveil Degree (falsetto), Marcus Hutson (baritone): background vocals
- Nicholas Caldwell: background vocals (tenor), arranger, album concept
- Richard Aguon, Kirk Perkins, Wardell Potts Jr., Ahaguna Sun: drums
- Dean Boysen, Oscar Brashear, Bobby Bryant, John Parrish: trumpets
- Melvin Coleman, David Agent, Leon F. Sylvers III, Werner Schuchner: bass
- Emilio Conesa, Ernest "Pepper" Reed, Werner Schuchner, Stephen Shockley: guitar
- Albert DeGarcia, Joey Gallo, Kossi Gardner, Greg Phillinganes, William Shelby, Ricky Smith, Kevin Spencer, Grady Wilkins, Mark Adam Wood, Jr.: keyboards
- David Duke, Barbara Korn, Sidney Muldrew: French horns
- Fred Jackson, Ruben Laxamana, Sonny Lewis: saxophone
- Kraig Kilbey, Ross Wilson: trombones
- Melecio Megdaluyo: flute, saxophone

== Charts ==
=== Weekly charts ===
Chart (1981)	Peak position
US Billboard 200	23
US Top R&B/Hip-Hop Albums (Billboard)	3

=== Year-end charts ===
Chart (1981)	Position
US Billboard 200	63
US Top R&B/Hip-Hop Albums (Billboard)	18

=== Singles ===
Year	Single	Chart positions		
Year	Single	US	US R&B	US Dance
1980-1981	It's a Love Thing	28	2	4
1980-1981	"I Can Make It Better"	105	40	4
