= Your Piece of the Rock =

Your Piece Of The Rock

Studio album by Dynasty
- Released: 1979
- Recorded: 1979 at Studio Masters, Los Angeles, CA
- Studio: Studio Masters
- Genre: Soul
- Label: SOLAR
- Producer: Leon Sylvers III; assistant producer: Dynasty

Dynasty chronology
| Your Piece Of The Rock (1979) | Adventures in the Land of Music (1980) |

Professional ratings
Review scores
| Source | Rating |
|---|---|
| Allmusic | (3/5) |

Your Piece of the Rock is the debut album by the Los Angeles, California-based R&B group Dynasty (band). Released in 1979.

== Track listing ==
1. "Your Piece of the Rock" (Dick Griffey, Leon Sylvers III, Foster Sylvers, Ricky Sylvers) 8:03
2. "I Don't Want to Be a Freak (But I Can't Help Myself)" (Dick Griffey, Leon Sylvers III, Nidra Beard) 7:20
3. "Satisfied" (Dick Griffey, Leon Sylvers III, Gene Dozier) 7:10
4. "When You Feel Like Giving Love (Dial My Number)" (Dick Griffey, Leon Sylvers III) 4:36
5. "It's Still a Thrill" (Dick Griffey, Leon Sylvers III) 5:20

== Personnel ==
=== Dynasty ===
- Nidra Beard, Linda Carriere: Main Vocals
- Ernest "Pepper" Reed: Guitars
- Kevin Spencer: Keyboards, Vocals
- William Shelby: Keyboards, Uncredited Vocals
- Leon Sylvers III: Bass, Drums, Percussion, Uncredited Vocal Backing

=== Additional Personnel ===
- Gene Dozier, Joey Gallo: Keyboards
- Ed Green: Drums
- Sonny Lewis, Fred Jackson: Saxophone
- George Bohannon, Craig Kilby: Trombone
- John Parrish, Oscar Bashear: Trumpet
- Sidney Muldrew: French Horn
- Viola: Brenton Banks, Marilyn Baker, Rolice Dale
- Larry Corbett, Miguel Martinez: Cello
- Violin: Gina Kronstadt, Haim Shtrum, Harris Goldman, Henry Roth, Jack Gootkin, Jerome Reisler, Jerome Webster, Robert Lipsett, William H. Henderson, Janice Gower (also concertmaster)

== Production ==
- Arranged and Produced by Leon Sylvers III and Dynasty
- Recording Engineers: Bob Brown, Don Blake
- Mixed by Steve Hodge at Westlake Studios
- Mastered by Wally Traugott at Capitol Records
- All songs published by Spectrum VII Music/Rosy Music, except "Satisfied" (Spectrum VII Music/Rosy Music/Proud Tunes)

== Samples ==
- "When You Feel Like Giving Love"
  - "Altitudes"" by Little Brother (group) on their The Chittlin Circuit album
