= Bingo (The Whispers album) =

Studio album by the Whispers
- Released: 1974
- Studio: Sigma Sound, Philadelphia, Pennsylvania
- Genre: Soul, funk, Philly soul
- Length: 37:07
- Label: Janus
- Producer: Ronnie Baker, Norman Harris, Earl Young, Bunny Sigler, Bruce Hawes, Charles Simmons

The Whispers chronology
Planets of Life (1973)	Bingo (1974)	One for the Money (1976)

Professional ratings
Review scores
Source	Rating
Allmusic	4/5 stars

Bingo is the fourth studio album by the Whispers. Released in 1974, this would be their final album for Janus Records before they moved over Don Cornelius's Soul Train Records.

== Track listing ==
Side one
No.	Title	Writer(s)	Length
1.	"A Mother for My Children"	Norman Harris, Allan Felder, Bunny Sigler	3:15
2.	"Someone's Waiting"	Allan Felder, Bunny Sigler, Norman Harris	3:37
3.	"Will You Be Mine"	Ronnie Baker, Norman Harris	3:37
4.	"Little Red Riding Hood"	Bunny Sigler, Allan Felder, James Sigler	3:40
5.	"Bingo"	Allan Felder, Bunny Sigler, Norman Harris	5:19

Side two
No.	Title	Writer(s)	Length
6.	"Once More With Feeling"	Ronald Baker	3:22
7.	"God Gave Me Everything"	Norman Harris, Allan Felder, Bunny Sigler	3:56
8.	"Where There Is Love"	Joseph Jefferson, Bruce Hawes, Charles Simmons	3:53
9.	"What More Can a Girl Ask For"	Allan Felder, Norman Harris	3:40
10.	"Don't Take Your Love"	Ron Kersey, Allan Felder, Bunny Sigler	3:00
11.	"Broken Home"	Norman Harris, Allan Felder	3:28

== Personnel ==
The Whispers

- Walter "Walt" Scott, Wallace "Scotty" Scott – lead tenors
- Marcus Hutson – baritone
- Leaveil Degree – first tenor
- Nicholas Caldwell – second tenor, baritone

Musicians

- Bobby Eli, Norman Harris – electric guitars
- Ronnie Baker – bass
- Earl Young – drums
- Larry Washington – congas, bongos
- Ron Kersey – piano, organ
- Bunny Sigler – piano
- Robert Cupit – bongos
- Vincent Montana Jr. – vibraphone
