= Love Is Where You Find It =

Studio album by the Whispers
- Released: Late 1981 or January 1982
- Genre: R&B; adult contemporary; soul; funk; post-disco
- Length: 38:29
- Label: SOLAR
- Producer: The Whispers; Leon Sylvers III; Ricky Sylvers; Wallace Scott; Walter Scott; Nicholas Caldwell

The Whispers chronology
This Kind of Lovin' (1981)	Love Is Where You Find It (1981)	Love for Love (1983)

Singles from Love Is Where You Find It
- 1. "In the Raw" Released: January 22, 1982; 2. "Emergency" Released: April 6, 1982; 3. "Love Is Where You Find It" Released: June 1982

Professional ratings
Review scores
Source	Rating
AllMusic	3/5 stars

Love Is Where You Find It is the eleventh studio album by American R&B/soul group the Whispers. It reached number 1 on the Billboard Top Soul Albums chart.

== Track listing ==
For Dancin'
No.	Title	Writer(s)	Length
1.	"In the Raw"	Glen Barbee, Charmaine Sylvers, Dana Meyers	5:53
2.	"Turn Me Out"	William Shelby, Dana Meyers, Nidra Beard	5:51
3.	"Cruisin' In"	Charmaine Sylvers, Karen Elliot, Nidra Beard	3:11
4.	"Emergency"	Kevin Spencer, Nidra Beard, William Shelby	4:18

For Romancin'
No.	Title	Writer(s)	Length
5.	"Say Yes"	Nicholas Caldwell	5:12
6.	"Love Is Where You Find It"	Mickey Carroll	5:19
7.	"Only You"	Nina James, Dub Putnam	4:26
8.	"Small Talkin'"	Clifford Goldsmith, Norman M. Williams	4:06

== Charts ==
=== Weekly charts ===
Chart (1982)	Peak position
US Billboard 200	35
US Top R&B/Hip-Hop Albums (Billboard)	1

=== Singles ===
Title	Chart (1982)	Peak position
"Emergency"	US Hot R&B/Hip-Hop Songs (Billboard)	22
"In the Raw"	US Hot R&B/Hip-Hop Songs (Billboard)	8
"In the Raw"	US Dance Club Songs (Billboard)	8

== See also ==
- List of Billboard number-one R&B albums of 1982
