= It's a Love Thing (The Whispers song) =

1981 single by The Whispers

Single by The Whispers

from the album Imagination
- B-side: "Girl I Need You"
- Released: January 1981
- Genre: Boogie; post-disco; synth-funk
- Length: 3:44 (7" version); 5:09 (12"/Album version)
- Label: SOLAR
- Songwriter(s): Dana Meyers; William Shelby
- Producer(s): The Whispers; Dick Griffey; Leon Sylvers III

The Whispers singles chronology
"Out the Box" (1980)	"It's a Love Thing" (1981)	"I Can Make It Better" (1981)

"It's a Love Thing" is a song by American R&B group The Whispers, released in January 1981 (and in March in the UK) as a single from their 1980 album Imagination.

== Reception ==
Reviewing the song for Record Mirror, James Hamilton described it as "skippable, but distinctive synth tones intro this thunderously smacking 0-117-118-119 bpm 12in smash-bound chunderer with cheerful catchy vocals and, as has been proved beyond question, real grow-on-you appeal".

== Music video ==
The music video features then-unknown actress Daphne Maxwell Reid as a correspondent in Hollywood waiting for the arrival of the group. As Scott gets out of the limousine, she asks him "how does it feel being platinum?", to which he replies "it feels great". She then asks another question and talks to the rest of the group before it cuts to the Whispers performing the song.

== Track listings ==
7" single

1. "It's a Love Thing" – 3:44
2. "Girl I Need You" – 4:17

12" single

1. "It's a Love Thing" – 5:09
2. "Girl I Need You" – 4:17

== Personnel ==
The Whispers

- Wallace "Scotty" Scott – lead vocals (tenor)
- Walter Scott – lead vocals (tenor)
- Leaveil Degree – backing vocals (falsetto)
- Marcus Hutson – backing vocals (baritone)
- Nicholas Caldwell – backing vocals (tenor)

Additional musicians

- Joey Gallo – keyboards
- Kevin Spencer – keyboards
- Rickey Smith – keyboards
- Earnest "Pepper" Reed – guitar
- Stephen Shockley – guitar
- Leon Sylvers III – bass
- Wardell Potts – drums
- Harvey Mason – percussion
- Gene Dozier – strings and horns arrangement

== Charts ==
It peaked at number 2 on Billboard's R&B chart and number 9 on the UK Singles Chart, becoming their second and last UK top-ten hit.

Chart (1981)	Peak position
Belgium (Ultratop 50 Flanders)	9
Finland (Suomen virallinen lista)	12
France (IFOP)	10
Ireland (IRMA)	17
Netherlands (Dutch Top 40)	5
Netherlands (Single Top 100)	11
UK Singles (OCC)	9
US Billboard Hot 100	28
US Hot R&B/Hip-Hop Songs (Billboard)	2
US Dance Club Songs (Billboard)	4

== Popular culture ==
- The song appeared in the 2005 film Diary of a Mad Black Woman, although didn't feature on the soundtrack.
- It appeared in the 2018 film The Front Runner.
- In 2016, it was used in an advert for L'Oréal.
