= Adventures in the Land of Music =

Studio album by Dynasty
- Released: June 30, 1980
- Recorded: 1980
- Studio: Studio Masters, Los Angeles, CA, Fort Knox Studios, Hollywood, CA, Jack Clements Recording Studios, Nashville, Tennessee
- Genre: Soul, Funk
- Label: SOLAR Records
- Producer: Leon Sylvers III

Dynasty chronology
Your Piece of the Rock (1979)	Adventures in the Land of Music (1980)	The Second Adventure (1981)

Professional ratings
Review scores
Source	Rating
Allmusic	4/5 stars

Adventures in the Land of Music is the second album by the Los Angeles, California-based R&B group Dynasty, released on June 30, 1980.

== Track listing ==
1. "I've Just Begun to Love You" (William Shelby, Ricky Smith) 6:26
2. "Groove Control" (Nidra Beard, William Shelby, Kevin Spencer) 4:47
3. "Take Another Look at Love" (Leon Sylvers III) 4:21
4. "Day and Night" (Wardell Potts, William Shelby) 5:59
5. "Do Me Right" (Nidra Beard, William Shelby) 6:04
6. "Something to Remember" (Nidra Beard, Linda Carriere, Gene Dozier) 4:38
7. "Adventures in the Land of Music" (Leon Sylvers III, Richard Randolph, Ricky Smith, Kevin Spencer) 4:14
8. "Ice Breaker" (Leon Sylvers III) 5:20

== Personnel ==
- Kevin Spencer, Linda Carriere, Nidra Beard – Lead vocals
- Ernest "Pepper" Reed, Richard Randolph – Guitar
- William Shelby - Keyboards, synthesizers, vocals
- Ricky Smith - Keyboards, synthesizers
- Gene Dozier, Joey Gallo, Kevin Spencer – Keyboards
- Leon Sylvers III – Bass
- Wardell Potts – Drums
- Harvey Mason, Kenny Hutson, Wayne Milstein – Percussion
- Dana Myers, Dynasty, Mark Philpart – Backing Vocals

== Charts ==
Chart (1980)	Peak position
Billboard 200	43
Billboard Top R&B Albums	11

=== Singles ===
Year	Single	Chart positions		
Year	Single	US	US R&B	US Dance
1980	"I've Just Begun to Love You"	87	6	5
1980	"Do Me Right"	—	34	—

== Samples ==
- "Adventures in the Land of Music" was sampled by Camp Lo in the song "Luchini AKA This Is It" on their album, Uptown Saturday Night, by American R&B singer Brooke Valentine for her single "Long as You Come Home" from her debut album Chain Letter, and by Angie Stone in her song "Lovers Ghetto" on her album ″Stone Love″.
