= The Second Adventure =

Studio album by Dynasty (band)
- Released: September 1, 1981
- Recorded: 1981 at Studio Masters, Los Angeles, CA
- Genre: Soul Funk
- Label: SOLAR Records
- Producer: Leon Sylvers III

Dynasty (band) chronology
Adventures in the Land of Music (1980)	The Second Adventure (1981)	Right Back At Cha! (1982)

Professional ratings
Review scores
Source	Rating
AllMusic	2/5 stars

The Second Adventure is the third album by the Los Angeles, California-based R&B group Dynasty. Released in 1981, it was produced by group member Leon Sylvers III.

== Track listing ==
1. "Here I Am" (Nidra Beard, Belinda Lipscomb, Melvin Gentry, William Shelby) 5:04
2. "Pain Got a Hold on Me" (Dana Meyers, William Shelby, Kevin Spencer) 3:43
3. "A Man in Love" (William Shelby, Stephen Shockley) 4:13
4. "Give Your Love to Me" (Nidra Beard, William Shelby, Kevin Spencer) 4:41
5. "You're My Angel" (Renwick Jackson) 3:33
6. "Love in the Fast Lane" (Nidra Beard, William Shelby, Kevin Spencer) 4:51
7. "Revenge" (Nidra Beard) 4:10
8. "Give It Up for Love" (Nidra Beard, Wardell Potts, William Shelby) 4:14
9. "High Time (I Left You Baby)" (Dana Meyers, Kevin Spencer) 3:47
10. "That Lovin' Feeling" (Ernest Reed) 4:24

== Personnel ==
- Kevin Spencer, Linda Carriere, Nidra Beard, Leon Sylvers III - Lead Vocals
- Leon Sylvers III, Foster Sylvers, Kenneth Gant - Bass
- William Shelby - Piano, Drums, Vocals
- Kevin Spencer - Drums, Piano, Clavinet
- Bo Watson - Fender Rhodes Electric Piano
- Joey Gallo, Patricia Sylvers, Michael Nash - Synthesizer
- Ricky Smith - Synthesizer, Fender Rhodes Electric Piano
- Ernest "Pepper" Reed, Melvin Gentry, Richard Randolph, Stephen Shockley - Guitar
- Kenny Hudson, Wayne Milstein - Percussion

== Charts ==
Chart (1981)	Peak position
US Top LPs & Tape (Billboard)	119
US Top R&B Albums (Billboard)	42

=== Singles ===
Year	Single	Chart positions	
Year	Single	US R&B	US Dance
1981	"Here I Am"	26	51
1981	"Love in the Fast Lane"	31	—
