= The Whispers (album) =

Studio album by the Whispers
- Released: October 24, 1979
- Recorded: 1979
- Studio: Studio Masters, (Los Angeles, California)
- Genre: Soul; disco; boogie; funk; R&B
- Length: 43:50
- Label: SOLAR
- Producer: The Whispers, Dick Griffey

The Whispers chronology
Happy Holidays to You (1979)	The Whispers (1979)	Imagination (1980)

Singles from The Whispers
- 1. "A Song for Donny" Released: February 4, 1979; 2. "My Girl" Released: August 10, 1979; 3. "Lady" Released: 1979; 4. "And the Beat Goes On" Released: 1979; 5. "Out the Box" Released: 1979

Professional ratings
Review scores
Source	Rating
AllMusic	3/5 stars
Christgau's Record Guide	B
Smash Hits	5/10
The Virgin Encyclopedia of R&B and Soul	3/5 stars

The Whispers is a studio album by American R&B/soul vocal group the Whispers, released on October 20, 1979, by SOLAR Records. It was the first hit album for the veteran group, peaking at number one on the Billboard Top Soul LPs chart, as well as number six on the Billboard Top LPs chart.

The album launched four singles, including their breakthrough single, the Leon Sylvers III-produced post-disco number, "And the Beat Goes On", which became their biggest hit single to date, reaching number one on the Hot Soul Singles chart, and crossing over to number 19 on the Billboard Hot 100, as well as landing in the top ten on various international charts. Other hit singles included "A Song for Donny", a tribute song to American musician Donny Hathaway, who died in January 1979. The song reached number 21 on the Hot Soul Singles chart. The Nicholas Caldwell-composed "Lady" became another hit, peaking at number three on the Hot Soul Singles chart, while also crossing over to the Hot 100 and adult contemporary charts and the UK charts, in 1980. A cover of the Temptations' "My Girl", became a hit in the UK, reaching number twenty six, while a fifth single, "Out the Box", was promoted briefly.

The album eventually went platinum becoming the Watts-based group's biggest success and their breakthrough after more than 15 years together.

== Track listing ==
1. "A Song for Donny" - (Donny Hathaway, special lyrics by Carrie Lucas) - 4:27
2. "My Girl" - (Smokey Robinson, Ronald White) - 5:53
3. "Lady" - (Nicholas Caldwell) - 5:05
4. "Can You Do the Boogie" - (Carrie Lucas, Norman Beavers) - 6:07
5. "And the Beat Goes On" - (William B. Shelby, Stephen Shockley, Leon Sylvers III) - 7:30 ^
6. "I Love You" - (Kossi Gardner) - 5:10
7. "Out the Box" - (William B. Shelby, Leon Sylvers III) - 4:57
8. "Welcome into My Dream" - (Grady Wilkins) - 4:40

^ Certain remastered versions of the album replace the full seven-and-a-half minute version of "And the Beat Goes On" with the edited version (length of 4:56) and include the full version as one of several bonus tracks.

== Personnel ==
- Bass – Craig "Mr. Bass" Raglin, Leon Sylvers III, Melvin Coleman
- Drums – Kirk Perkins, Wardell Potts, William "Buba" Bryant
- Guitar – Larry White, Stephen Shockley, Werner Schuchner (Bear)
- Keyboards – Barry Sarna, Grady Wilkins, Kevin Spencer, Kossi Gardner, Norman Beavers, Ricky Smith, William Shelby
- Percussion – Bobbye Hall, Fred "Timbales" Lewis, Karl E. Dickens
- Vocals – Leaveil Degree, Marcus Hutson, Nicholas Caldwell, Wallace Scott, Walter Scott

== Charts ==
Chart (1980)	Peak position
Billboard Pop Albums	6
Billboard Top Soul Albums	1

=== Singles ===
Year	Single	US Chart positions		
Year	Single	US	US R&B	US Dance
1979	"A Song for Donny"	—	21	—
1980	"Lady"	28	3	—
1980	"And the Beat Goes On"	19	1	1
1980	"My Girl"	—	—	—

== Certifications ==
Region	Certification	Certified units/sales
United States (RIAA)	Platinum	1,000,000^{^}
^{^} Shipments figures based on certification alone.

== See also ==
- List of Billboard number-one R&B albums of 1980
