= Rock Steady (The Whispers song) =

- A-side label of U.S. 12-inch vinyl single

Single by the Whispers

from the album Just Gets Better with Time
- B-side: "Are You Going My Way"
- Released: June 13, 1987
- Recorded: 1987
- Genre: New jack swing, funk
- Length: 4:49
- Label: SOLAR; Capitol
- Songwriters: Babyface; L.A. Reid; Bo Watson; Dwayne Ladd
- Producers: L.A. Reid; Babyface

The Whispers singles chronology
| "And the Beat Goes On" (1987) | "Rock Steady" (1987) | "Special F/X" (1987) |

Alternative cover art
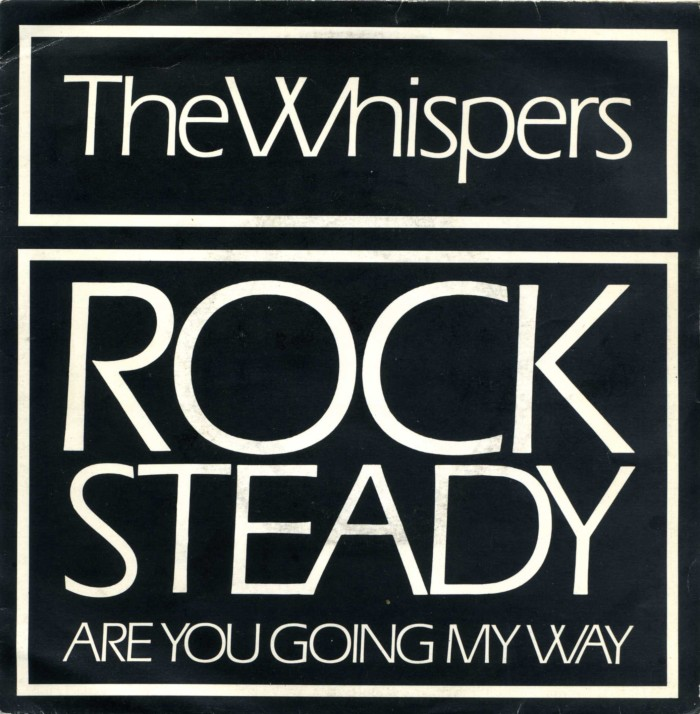
- Artwork for Belgian vinyl releases

Music video
- "Rock Steady" on YouTube

"Rock Steady" is a song by American group the Whispers, released as a single from their 18th studio album Just Gets Better with Time (1987). Originally recorded as a demo in 1986 by Kenneth "Babyface" Edmonds, he later produced the song along with Antonio "L.A." Reid.

== Chart performance ==
It was released on June 13, 1987, peaking at No. 7 on the US Billboard Hot 100, No. 10 on the US Cash Box Top 100 and it was their second and final number one on the Hot Black Singles chart.

== Charts ==
=== Weekly charts ===
Weekly chart performance for "Rock Steady"
| Chart (1987) | Peak position |
|---|---|
| Netherlands (Single Top 100) | 45 |
| UK Singles (Official Charts) | 38 |
| US Billboard Hot 100 | 7 |
| US Hot R&B/Hip-Hop Songs (Billboard) | 1 |
| US Cash Box | 10 |

=== Year-end charts ===
1987 year-end chart performance for "Rock Steady"
| Chart (1987) | Position |
|---|---|
| US Billboard Hot 100 | 73 |
| US Hot Black Singles (Billboard) | 23 |
| US Crossover Singles (Billboard) | 8 |

== Songs influenced by "Rock Steady" ==
A re-recorded version of the instrumental from this song was used on Kylie Minogue's song "Look My Way" from her debut album Kylie (1988). The actual instrumental from "Rock Steady" was sampled in the truncated version of "Look My Way" that appeared on Minogue's 1993 remix album Kylie's Non-Stop History 50+1.

== See also ==
- List of Hot Black Singles number ones of 1987
