= Right Back at Cha! =

Studio album by Dynasty
- Released: October 22, 1982
- Recorded: 1982 at Studio Masters, Los Angeles, California; Wally Heider Studios, Hollywood, California; Larrabee Sound Studios, Los Angeles, California
- Genres: Soul; R&B
- Label: SOLAR Records
- Producers: Leon Sylvers III; Foster Sylvers; William Shelby; Kevin Spencer

Dynasty chronology
The Second Adventure (1981)	Right Back at Cha! (1982)	Daydreamin' (1986)

Professional ratings
Review scores
Source	Rating
Allmusic	3/5 stars

Right Back at Cha! is the fourth album by the Los Angeles, California-based R&B group Dynasty. Released in 1982, it was produced by group member Leon Sylvers III.

== Track listing ==
1. Check It Out – (Barbee, Shelby, Spencer) 5:49
2. Strokin' – (Barbee, Brantley, Randolph, Smith) 5:08
3. The Only One – (Harris, Lewis) 4:30
4. Questions – (Carriere, Potts) 3:30
5. Does That Ring a Bell – (Meyers, Parker, Potts) 3:56
6. Straight Out – (Meyers, Parker) 3:34
7. Right Back at Cha! – (Shelby, Spencer, Sylvers) 4:36
8. That's the Way I Feel About You – (Meyers, Shelby, Spencer, Smith) 3:59
9. I Can't Stop Loving You – (Barbee, Shelby, Shockley) 4:48
10. All's Fair in Love and War – (Barbee, Sylvers, Sylvers) 4:40

== Charts ==
Chart (1983)	Peak position
US Top R&B Albums (Billboard)	54

=== Singles ===
Year	Single	Chart positions
Year	Single	US R&B
1983	"Check It Out"	39
