= One for the Money (The Whispers album) =

Studio album by the Whispers
- Released: 1976
- Recorded: Sigma Sound (Philadelphia, Pennsylvania); RCA's Music Center of the World (Hollywood, California)
- Genre: Soul, funk, disco
- Length: 38:29
- Label: Soul Train
- Producer: Norman Harris

The Whispers chronology
Bingo (1974)	One for the Money (1976)	Open Up Your Love (1977)

Professional ratings
Review scores
Source	Rating
Allmusic	2.5/5 stars
Sounds	2/5 stars

One for the Money is an album by the Whispers. Released in 1976, this album charted at number 40 on the Billboard Soul Albums chart. It was their debut album on Don Cornelius's and Dick Griffey's Soul Train Records.

== Track listing ==
Side one
No.	Title	Writer(s)	Length
1.	"One for the Money"	Jerry Aikens, John Bellmon, Victor Drayton, Reginald Turner	3:05
2.	"Living Together (In Sin)"	Van McCoy, Joe Cobb	4:06
3.	"Put Me in the News"	Bruce Gray, Allan Felder	4:15
4.	"You're Only as Good as You Think You Are"	Bruce Gray, Allan Felder	6:48

Side two
No.	Title	Writer(s)	Length
5.	"Sounds Like a Love Song"	Douglas Gibbs, Ralph Johnson	7:39
6.	"I've Got a Feeling"	Bruce Gray, Allan Felder, T.G. Conway	3:18
7.	"In My Heart"	Bruce Gray, Allan Felder, T.G. Conway	6:53

== Personnel ==
- Norman Harris, T.J. Tindell, Bobby Eli – guitars
- Ronald Baker, Michael Foreman – bass
- Earl Young – drums
- Ron Kersey – keyboards
- Larry Washington – congas
- Brian Evans – acoustic guitar
- Bruce Gray – Rhodes piano

== Charts ==
Chart (1976)	Peak position
Billboard Pop Albums	189
Billboard Top Soul Albums	40

=== Singles ===
Year	Single	Chart positions	
Year	Single	US Pop	US R&B
1976	"Living Together (In Sin)"	-	21
1976	"One for the Money"	88	10
1977	"You're Only as Good as You Think You Are"	-	91
