= Daydreamin' (Dynasty album) =

Studio album by Dynasty
- Released: 1986
- Recorded: 1986
- Genre: Soul
- Label: SOLAR Records

Dynasty chronology
Right Back at Cha! (1982)	Daydreamin' (1986)	Out of Control (1988)

Professional ratings
Review scores
Source	Rating
Allmusic	(2/5)

Daydreamin' is the fifth album by the Los Angeles, California-based R&B group Dynasty, released in 1986.

== Track listing ==
1. "Cherry Red Bikini", ´6:30 (Lathan Armor, Duncan Payne)
2. "Way Out", 5:59 (Kevin Spencer, William Shelby)
3. "Freeway lover", 5:27 (William Shelby, Bo Watson)
4. "Everlasting", 4:43 (William Shelby, Norman Beavers)
5. "Personality", 4:42 (Kenneth Edmonds, Antonio Reid, Dwayne Ladd)
6. "Daydreamin'", 4:49 (Kevin Spencer, William Shelby)
7. "Tuff Love", 5:31 (Nidra Sylvers, Rickey Smith, William Shelby)
8. "Lock on Love"; 4:27 (William Shelby, Steve Shockley, Leon Sylvers III)
