= Speak for Me =

Speak for Me may refer to:

- "Speak for Me", a 2003 song by Cat Power from You Are Free
- "Speak for Me", a 2012 song by John Mayer from Born and Raised
