= Not What You Want =

Not What You Want may refer to:

- "Not What You Want", a song by Sleater-Kinney form their 1997 album Dig Me Out
- "Not What You Want", a song by Cat Power from her 1996 album Myra Lee
