= Whisper in Your Ear =

Studio album by the Whispers
- Released: 1979
- Recorded: 1979
- Studio: Studio Masters, Los Angeles, California
- Genre: Soul, funk
- Length: 34:41
- Label: SOLAR
- Producer: Dick Griffey, the Whispers

The Whispers chronology
Headlights (1978)	Whisper in Your Ear (1979)	Happy Holidays to You (1979)

Professional ratings
Review scores
Source	Rating
AllMusic	3/5 stars
Music Week	2/4 stars

Whisper in Your Ear is an album by the Whispers released in 1979 on the SOLAR Records label. This album peaked at number 28 on the Billboard Soul Albums chart.

== Track listing ==
Side one
No.	Title	Writer(s)	Length
1.	"Homemade Lovin'"	Leon Sylvers III	3:50
2.	"Jump for Joy"	Otis Stokes, Fred Alexander, Jr., Stephen Shockley	5:02
3.	"If I Don't Get Your Love"	Malcolm Anthony	4:10
4.	"Whisper in Your Ear"	Leon Sylvers III, James Sylvers	4:09

Side two
No.	Title	Writer(s)	Length
5.	"Love at Its Best"	Kenney Hirsh, Kathy Wakefield	3:25
6.	"Can't Do Without Love"	Keni Burke, Curtis Mayfield	5:22
7.	"Pretty Lady"	Kossi Gardner	5:01
8.	"You'll Never Get Away"	Malcolm Anthony	3:42

== Credits ==
  - A&R [A&R Coordination] – Marge Meoli
  - Arranged By [Vocal] – Nicholas Caldwell
  - Bass – Melvin Coleman (2), Otis Stokes, Wilton Felder
  - Cello – Juliana Buffum*, Miguel Martinez*, Nils Oliver
  - Concertmaster, Violin – Janice Gower
  - Design [Album] – Gribbitt!, Tim Bryant (2)
  - Drums – Ed Greene (2), Fred Alexander Jr., James Gadson
  - Engineer [Mixing] – Kerry McNabb
  - Engineer [Recording], Engineer [Mixing] – Steve Hodge
  - Guitar – David T. Walker, Earnest Reed, Wah Wah Watson*, Paul Jackson Jr., Ricky Sylvers, Stephen Shockley
  - Keyboards – Greg Phillinganes, Joey Gallo, Kenney Hirsh*, Norman Beavers, Sonny Burke (2)
  - Mastered By – Wally Traugott
  - Percussion – Fred Lewis (2), Paulinho Da Costa
  - Photography By – Ron Slenzak
  - Producer – Dick Griffey, The Whispers
  - Producer [Special Assistant] – Kossi Gardner, Lakeside
  - Producer [Special Assistant], Bass – Leon Sylvers
  - Saxophone – Don Myrick, Fred Jackson Jr.*, Edward Lewis*
  - Trombone – George Bohanon, Kraig Kilby, Louis Satterfield, Maurice Spears
  - Trumpet – Robert O. Bryant*, John Parrish, Michael Harris, Nolan Smith Jr.*, Michael Davis*
  - Viola – Marilyn H. Baker*, Rollice E. Dale*
  - Violin – David Montagu, Gina Kronstadt, Haim Shtrum, Harris Goldman, Henry L. Roth*, Jack Gootkin, Jerome J. Reisler*, Joseph Goodman, Joseph Stepansky, William H. Henderson*

== Charts ==
Chart (1979)	Peak position
Billboard Pop Albums	146
Billboard Top Soul Albums	28

=== Singles ===
Year	Single	Chart positions
Year	Single	US R&B
1979	"Can't Do Without Love"	43
1979	"Homemade Lovin'"	66
