= Benjamin Angus Wright =

Ben Wright
- Genre: Television scores
- Occupation: Composer
- Years active: 2002-present

Benjamin Angus Wright is an English award-winning media composer based in London, England. He has composed for the BBC, Discovery, Destination Films and many other major clients. In 2009 he won 'Best Music' at the prestigious Missoula International Wildlife Film Festival for his score to Mike Birkhead's Amba, the Russian Tiger. His company is called 'Compose to Picture'. Before working in television and film, Wright wrote for the band "Obaben" (Human Condition Records) and "Delay 68" to critical acclaim in the Scottish press.
