= He War =

Single by Cat Power

from the album You Are Free
- Released: 2003
- Recorded: 2002
- Genre: Indie rock
- Length: 3:31
- Label: Matador
- Songwriter(s): Chan Marshall
- Producer(s): Adam Kasper (engineer only)

Cat Power singles chronology
| "Free" (2003) | "He War" (2003) | "The Greatest" (2006) |

"He War" is a song by the American singer/songwriter Cat Power and the second single from her 2003 album, You Are Free. Foo Fighters' frontman Dave Grohl provided drumming for the track. In anticipation of the release of You Are Free, a digital preview of "He War" was released on the Matador Records website.

In 2006, Saturday Night Live cast member Fred Armisen cited Cat Power as "very popular in the SNL offices" and that "'He War' was played all the time." In the same interview, an opposing Chan Marshall expressed strong discontent with the studio recording of "He War" that ended up on You Are Free. She exclaimed, "Horrible song. It's supposed to sound like the original recordings-- more Stones-y. With a live band. But when I went to record it by myself in the studio doing everything, it sounds like..."

== Song description ==
Delicate piano notes serve as an introduction before the guitar rhythm begins. "He War" exhibits clean, electric guitar power chords backed by a shuffling drum beat. High, chiming guitar notes provide a lead section alongside sprinkles of piano. An unrefined, double-track vocal harmony by Marshall carries throughout the entire song and builds into a bright, soaring chorus.

Lyrically, "He War" appears to reference the demise of an old relationship and the decision to move forward.

== Music video ==
A video directed by Brett Vapnek was filmed for the single. It gained airplay on MTV2's Subterranean.

Marshall described the video as "good" but elaborated on the discomfort in filming it, specifically acting, lip syncing, and looking into the camera which felt unnatural:

"These videos are so weird, because they had me playing a person. . . So in my video, I am me. It's the weirdest feeling. You are you in the song. . . As far as some sort of artwork, I don't know if that makes sense. It has nothing to do with music. Being in a video, lyrically speaking, your persona has nothing to do with being in a video."

== Reception ==
Allmusic's Tom Maginnis wrote a thorough review of "He War," calling it "one of the heaviest rock songs" on You Are Free as well as one of the most produced. He added, "'He War' show signs of a maturity, of an artist more comfortable in the studio setting and confident enough to make it work to her advantage." It was also named an AMG Track Pick of You Are Free.

Chris Ott of Pitchfork Media praised the song, noting that "'He War' underscores how remarkable Marshall's voice is, turning an otherwise pedestrian, technically amateur tune into an assured rock anthem draped in sonorous, shrill wails. The tune proves a worthy successor to the detached, bemused innocence of 'Cross Bones Style'."

== Track listing ==
1. "He War"
2. "Good Woman" (featuring Eddie Vedder)
3. "(I Can't Get No) Satisfaction" (Jagger/Richards)
