= Headlights (Cat Power song) =

Single by Cat Power

from the album Dear Sir
- B-side: "Darling Said Sir"
- Released: 1993
- Recorded: 1993
- Genre: Lo-fi, alternative rock, indie rock
- Length: 10:23
- Label: The Making of Americans
- Songwriter: Chan Marshall
- Producer: Craig Flanagin

Cat Power singles chronology
"Headlights" (1993)	"Nude as the News" (1996)

"Headlights" is a song by American singer-songwriter Cat Power, released as her debut single in 1993 on the label The Making of Americans. The song is a first-person narrative that tells of a girl dying on the road after a car accident.

The photograph featured on the front cover of the single was taken by photographer Emmet Gowin in Danville, Virginia in 1969, titled "Nancy." The single received a limited 500 pressings on 7-inch vinyl.

== Composition ==
The song was written by Marshall, with the addition of Bob Bannister (guitar, violin) and Glen Thrasher (drums). The lyrics are a first-person narrative about a young woman dying on the side of a road after a car accident. It alternates between the scene of the woman dying as her friend stands over her, and the conversation that took place moments prior to the accident. Marshall later revealed that she wrote the song about a friend of hers who had died. The song was re-recorded by Cat Power in December 1994 with guitarist Tim Foljahn and drummer Steve Shelley, and was placed on her debut album, Dear Sir (1995).

The version of the song featured on the single includes an untuned violin in addition to guitar and drums, whereas the later version of the song that appeared on Dear Sir was recorded with guitar and drums only, and featured more distortion.

== Track listing ==
No.	Title	Writer(s)	Length
1.	"Headlights"	Chan Marshall	5:42
2.	"Darling Said Sir"	Marshall	4:41
Total length:			10:23

=== Personnel ===
- Chan Marshall – vocals, guitar
- Bob Bannister – guitar, violin
- Glenn Thrasher – drums
- Craig Flanagin – producer
- Don Fury – engineer
