= Just Gets Better with Time =

Studio album by the Whispers
- Released: April 9, 1987
- Recorded: December 1986–March 1987
- Studios: Studio Masters and Skip Saylor Recording (Los Angeles, California); Different Fur Studios (San Francisco, California); Infinite Studios (Alameda, California)
- Genres: R&B, dance-pop, soul
- Length: 39:30
- Labels: SOLAR, Capitol
- Producers: L.A. Reid & Babyface; Leon Sylvers III; Nicholas Caldwell; Larry White; Gary Taylor; Grady Wilkins

The Whispers chronology
So Good (1984)	Just Gets Better with Time (1987)	More of the Night (1990)

Singles from Just Gets Better With Time
- 1. "Rock Steady" Released: June 13, 1987

Professional ratings
Review scores
Source	Rating
AllMusic	link

Just Gets Better with Time is a studio album by American R&B/Soul group the Whispers. It was released on April 9, 1987, via Capitol/SOLAR Records. This album features their highest charting pop single, "Rock Steady," which peaked inside the top 10 at number 7. The song also reached number 1 on the U.S. R&B chart.

Four more singles were released into the following year. Although none of these additional singles brought further pop success, with the follow-up single "Special F/X" only charting in the UK (peaking at No. 69), the group maintained a strong presence on the R&B chart. The album's title track, "Just Gets Better with Time," reached number 12, and "In the Mood"—long a quiet storm radio staple—charted four spots lower at number 16. The fifth and final single, 1988's "No Pain, No Gain" reached No. 74 on the R&B chart, while landing at number 81 in the UK.

Despite the relative Hot 100 chart failure of the follow-ups to "Rock Steady," the album itself was a strong seller; it charted highly in the U.S. (No. 22 on the Billboard Top 200 chart—their second-highest showing there) while reaching No. 3 on R&B. It is RIAA-certified platinum.

== Track listing ==
1. "I Want You" (Richard Aguon, Ruben Laxamana, Lee Peters, Larry White) – 5:42
2. "Special F/X" (Leon Sylvers III, J.M. Sylvers) – 5:10
3. "Rock Steady" (Babyface, L.A. Reid, Bo Watson, Dwayne Ladd) – 4:49
4. "No Pain, No Gain" (Kenny Aubrey, Kevin Grady, Leon Sylvers III) – 4:12
5. "In the Mood" (Babyface, Daryl Simmons) – 4:47
6. "Just Gets Better with Time" (Gary Taylor) – 4:30
7. "Love's Calling" (Grady Wilkins) – 4:58
8. "Give It to Me" (Nicholas Caldwell) – 5:21

== Personnel ==
The Whispers

- Nicholas Caldwell – backing vocals
- Leaveil Degree – backing vocals
- Marcus Hutson – backing vocals
- Wallace "Scotty" Scott – lead vocals, backing vocals
- Walter Scott – backing vocals

Musicians

- Ruben Laxamana – keyboards (1), bass synthesizer (1)
- Dewayne Sweet – keyboards (1)
- Larry White – keyboards (1), percussion (1), guitars (8)
- Henry Concepcion – synthesizer solo (1), grand piano solo (1)
- Leon Sylvers III – keyboards (2), bass (2, 4), drum programming (2, 4), percussion (2, 4)
- Babyface – keyboards (3, 5), guitars (5)
- Kevin Grady – keyboards (4), computer programming (4), percussion (4)
- Gary Taylor – keyboards (6), synthesizers (6), DMX drum programming (6)
- Grady Wilkins – keyboards (7, 8), string synthesizer (7), bass (8)
- Ron Artist – Prophet 2000 flute solo (7)
- Percy Scott – keyboards (8)
- Stan Jones – guitars (2, 4)
- Michael Thompson – guitars (6)
- David Grigsby – guitars (7)
- Kayo – bass (3, 5)
- Craig Ragland – bass (6)
- Melvin Coleman – bass (8)
- L.A. Reid – drums (3, 5), percussion (3, 5)
- Gregory Sweet – drum programming (7)
- Kirk Perkins – drums (8), percussion (8)
- Terral Santiel – percussion (2)
- Don Myrick – saxophone solo (8)

Additional vocalists

- Lee Peters – backing vocals (1)
- Grady Wilkins – backing vocals (1, 3)
- Babyface – backing vocals (3)
- Gary Taylor – backing vocals (3, 6)

Music arrangements

- Ruben Laxamana – horn arrangements (1)
- Larry White – horn and vocal arrangements (1), rhythm arrangements (1, 7)
- Leon Sylvers III – rhythm and vocal arrangements (2, 4)
- Babyface – rhythm, string and vocal arrangements (3, 5)
- L.A. Reid – rhythm arrangements (3, 5)
- Kevin Grady – rhythm arrangements (4)
- Gary Taylor – horn, rhythm, string and vocal arrangements (6)
- Nicholas Caldwell – rhythm arrangements (7, 8), vocal arrangements (8)
- Grady Wilkins – rhythm arrangements (7, 8), vocal arrangements (7), string arrangements (8)

== Production ==
- Larry White – producer (1)
- Leon Sylvers III – producer (2, 4)
- Babyface – producer (3, 5)
- L.A. Reid – producer (3, 5)
- Gary Taylor – producer (6)
- Grady Wilkins – producer (7)
- Nicholas Caldwell – producer (8)
- Craig Burbidge – recording, mixing
- Michael Denton – recording
- Jon Gass – recording, mixing
- Tim Jaquett – recording
- Howard Johnson – recording
- Barney Perkins – mixing
- Dave Rideaux – recording
- Skip Saylor – recording
- Mark Siegel – recording
- Wally Traugott – mastering at Capitol Records (Hollywood, California)
- Carmen Davis – A&R coordinator
- Regina Griffey – A&R coordinator
- Brenda Patrick – A&R coordinator
- Art Sims – art direction
- Matthew Rolston – photography
- Daniel M. – cover photography
- Lalette Littlejohn – make-up
- Lloyd Cook – hair
- Mel Grayson – stylist
- Michael J. Gardner – management

== Charts ==
=== Weekly charts ===
Chart (1987)	Peak position
US Billboard 200	22
US Top R&B/Hip-Hop Albums (Billboard)	3
