= Open Up Your Love =

Studio album by the Whispers
- Released: 1977
- Genre: Soul, funk, disco
- Label: Soul Train
- Producer: Don Cornelius, Dick Griffey, the Whispers

The Whispers chronology
| One for the Money (1976) | Open Up Your Love (1977) | Headlights (1978) |

Professional ratings
Review scores
| Source | Rating |
|---|---|
| Allmusic | 3/5 stars |

Open Up Your Love is an album by the Whispers. Released in 1977, this album reached number 23 on the Billboard Soul Albums chart. This was their last album on Don Cornelius and Dick Griffey's Soul Train Records before transitioning over to manager Dick Griffey's SOLAR Records.

The single "I'm Gonna Make You My Wife" was featured in the motion picture Waiting to Exhale, but did not appear on the soundtrack.

== Track listing ==
Side one
| No. | Title | Writer(s) | Length |
|---|---|---|---|
| 1. | "Make It with You" | David Gates | 4:59 |
| 2. | "Chocolate Girl" | Wayne Bell | 3:38 |
| 3. | "Love Is a Dream" | Wayne Bell | 4:49 |
| 4. | "Open Up Your Love" | Wayne Bell | 4:41 |

Side two
| No. | Title | Writer(s) | Length |
|---|---|---|---|
| 5. | "I Fell in Love Last Night (At the Disco)" | Malcolm Anthony | 4:27 |
| 6. | "You Are Number One" | Malcolm Anthony | 3:59 |
| 7. | "You Never Miss the Water ('Til Your Well Runs Dry)" | Don Cornelius | 3:34 |
| 8. | "I'm Gonna Make You My Wife" | Wayne Bell | 4:59 |

== Personnel ==
- The Whispers: all lead and backing vocals
- David T. Walker, Dean Parks, Lee Ritenour, Marlo Henderson, Wah-Wah Watson: Guitars
- Joe Sample, Reginald "Sonny" Burke: Keyboards
- Alphonso Johnson (fretless solo on track B3), Wilton Felder: Bass
- Ed Greene, James Gadson: Drums
- Paulinho da Costa: Percussion
- Terry Harrington: Tenor sax solo on track B4

Production

- A&R, Coordinator – Marge Meoli
- Background vocal arrangements by Nick Caldwell
- Rhythm arrangements by Gene Page, Jerry Peters
- String and horn arrangements by Bruce Miller and Gene Page
- Album designed by Gribbitt, Tim Bryant (2)
- Engineer [Mix] – Steve Hodge
- Engineer [Recording] – Mic Litz, Peter Granet, Steve Hirsch, Steve Mazlow
- Executive Producer – Dick Griffey, Don Cornelius
- Photography By – Ron Slenzak
- Producer – Dick Griffey, Don Cornelius, the Whispers

== Charts ==
| Chart (1977) | Peak position |
|---|---|
| Billboard Pop Albums | 65 |
| Billboard Top Soul Albums | 23 |

=== Singles ===
| Year | Single | Chart positions | |
| Year | Single | US Pop | US R&B |
|---|---|---|---|
| 1977 | "Make It With You" | 94 | 10 |
| 1978 | "I'm Gonna Make You My Wife" | - | 54 |
