= Benjamin Fletcher Wright =

- Born: February 8, 1900; Austin, Texas
- Died: November 28, 1976 (aged 76); Austin, Texas
- Education: B.A., M.A. – University of Texas (1921); Ph.D – Harvard University
- Occupations: Author, educator
- Known for: President of Smith College, 1949–1959
- Spouse: Alexa Rhea (m. 1926)
- Children: 2

Benjamin Fletcher Wright Jr. (February 8, 1900 – November 28, 1976), was an author and educator who was an authority on United States Constitutional law. He was the President of Smith College and also was a member of the faculties at the University of Texas and Harvard University, with many works to his credit.

== Early life and education ==
Wright was born in Austin, Texas, on February 8, 1900. His parents were Benjamin F. and Mary (Blandford) Wright. He had an interest in political science, and government, that developed at an early age, with a particular interest in Thomas Jefferson he acquired in grade school. Wright graduated from the University of Texas in 1921, where he earned a B.A. and M.A. degrees. In 1925 he attended Harvard University where he earned a Ph.D. In 1926, he married Alexa Rhea, whose marriage brought two children.

== Career ==
Wright taught at the University of Texas from 1922 to 1926. In late 1926 Wright began teaching at Harvard from 1926 until coming to Smith in 1949. While at Harvard, he was the chairman of the Government department and served on the special Harvard Committee on General Education. He was a member of the Harvard faculty: from 1928 to 1940 an assistant professor, from 1940 to 1945 as associate professor and from 1945 to 1949 as a full professor. Wright was one among several authors of the "renowned" report published in 1945 by the Committee entitled, General Education in a Free Society. In 1949 he became the fifth president of Smith College, serving until 1959. After leaving Smith College, Wright became a fellow for a term of one year at the center for Advanced Study in Behavioral Science, at Stanford University in California. In 1960 he returned to the University of Texas as a professor of government where he taught until the year before his death.

"The Office of the President: Benjamin Wright Papers" are in the possession of Smith College Library and are primarily related to his official duty while he served as President of Smith College. The papers consist of correspondence, memoranda, reports, legal documents, speeches, minutes, and newspaper articles.

Wright died on Sunday, November 28, 1976, at his home in Austin, Texas, at the age of 76.

== Works ==
Wright's works include:

- Wright, Benjamin Fletcher (1938). The Contract Clause Of The Constitution. Harvard University Press.
- —— (1929) A source book of American political theory
- —— (1945). General Education in a Free Society: Report of the Harvard Committee. Harvard University. Committee on the Objectives of a General Education in a Free Society.
- —— (1946). The growth of American constitutional law. New York: Henry Holt and Company.
- —— (1962). American interpretations of natural law, a study in the history of political thought. New York: Russell & Russell. ISBN 978-0-2927-2407-5.
- ——; (ed.) (1962) The Federalist
- —— (1967). Consensus and continuity, 1776-1787. New York: W. W. Norton & Company, Inc.
- —— (2015) [1973]. 5 Public Philosophies of Walter Lippmann. Austin, Texas: University of Texas Press.

== See also ==
- Bibliography of the United States Constitution
- Founding Fathers of the United States

== Sources ==
- "Benjamin Fletcher Wright". WordPress: Smithipedia. 2023.
- "Smith College Presidents". Smith College, Massachusetts.
- "Benjamin Fletcher Wright papers". Smith College Library. 2023.
- "Benjamin Wright, Educator, Authority On Constitution Law". New York Times. New York, NY. November 30, 1976. p. 42.
