= Headlights (The Whispers album) =

Studio album by the Whispers
- Released: 1978
- Recorded: 1978 at Westlake Audio, Los Angeles, California
- Genre: Soul, funk, disco
- Label: SOLAR
- Producer: Dick Griffey, the Whispers

The Whispers chronology
Open Up Your Love (1977)	Headlights (1978)	Whisper in Your Ear (1979)

Professional ratings
Review scores
Source	Rating
Allmusic	3/5 stars

Headlights is an album by the Whispers released in 1978 on the SOLAR Records label. This album charted at number 22 on the Billboard Soul Albums chart.

== Track listing ==
Side one
No.	Title	Writer(s)	Length
1.	"Headlights"	Dick Griffey	7:32
2.	"(Olivia) Lost and Turned Out"	Malcolm Anthony	4:05
3.	"(Let's Go) All the Way"	Melvin Ragin, Reginald Burke, Art Posey, Josef Brown	4:50
4.	"(You're a) Special Part of My Life"	Clarence McDonald, Deniece Williams, Lani Groves	3:55

Side two
No.	Title	Writer(s)	Length
5.	"The Planets of Life"	Ron Carson	7:19
6.	"Try and Make It Better"	Dick Griffey, Greg Phillinganes	6:00
7.	"Disco Melody"	Merlin Bell	3:40
8.	"Children of Tomorrow"	Wayne Bell	4:04

== Credits ==
- A&r [Coordination] – Marge Meoli
- Arranged By [Horn & String] – Tom Tom 84 (tracks: A1 to A4, B2, B3)
- Arranged By [Rhythm] – Gene Page (tracks: A2, A4, B3, B4)
- Design [Album] – Tim Bryant (2)
- Engineer – Steve Hodge
- Mastered By – Wally Traugott
- Photography By – Ron Slenzak
- Producer – Dick Griffey

== Charts ==
Chart (1978)	Peak position
Billboard Pop Albums	77
Billboard Top Soul Albums	22

=== Singles ===
Year	Single	Chart positions
Year	Single	US R&B
1978	"(Let's Go) All The Way"	10
1978	"(Olivia) Lost and Turned Out"	13
