= And the Beat Goes On (The Whispers song) =

- A-side label of U.S. 12-inch vinyl single

Single by the Whispers

from the album The Whispers
- B-side: "Can You Do the Boogie"
- Released: 1979
- Genre: Post-disco; electro-funk
- Length: 7:30 (Long version); 4:30 (Video edit); 3:25 (7' version)
- Label: SOLAR
- Songwriters: Leon Sylvers; Stephen Shockley; William Shelby
- Producers: Dick Griffey; The Whispers

The Whispers singles chronology
"A Song for Donny" (1979)	"And the Beat Goes On" (1979)	"Lady" (1980)

Music video
- "And the Beat Goes On" on YouTube

"And the Beat Goes On" is a 1979 single by the American music group the Whispers. The song was their first of two number-one singles on the Soul chart, and their first Top 20 hit on the Billboard Hot 100, peaking at number 19. "And the Beat Goes On" was the group's only number-one song on the dance chart. It was also their first and biggest hit in the United Kingdom, peaking at number 2 on the UK Singles Chart. The song also peaked at number 27 on the Canadian RPM chart and was in the Canadian Top 100 for 21 weeks.

In 1996 after Phyllis Hyman died, the Whispers honored her with a musical: Thank God! The Beat Goes On. The fictionalized story intertwines the long-running career of the Whispers with the rise of Hyman, using songs by the Whispers including ones Hyman sang with them such as "The Beat Goes On". The Whispers played themselves while R&B singer Alyson Williams played the role of Hyman.

== Track listing ==
7-inch single

1. "And the Beat Goes On" – 3:25
2. "Can You Do the Boogie" – 3:50

12-inch single

1. "And the Beat Goes On" – 7:30
2. "Can You Do the Boogie" – 6:07

== Charts ==
=== Weekly charts ===
Weekly chart performance for "And the Beat Goes On"
Chart (1980)	Peak position
Belgium (Ultratop 50 Flanders)	30
Canada Top AC (RPM)	33
Canada Top 100 (RPM)	27
Germany (GfK)	20
Ireland (IRMA)	14
Netherlands (Dutch Top 40)	26
Netherlands (Single Top 100)	19
New Zealand (Recorded Music NZ)	7
Sweden (Sverigetopplistan)	16
UK Singles (Official Charts)	2
US Billboard Hot 100	19
US Billboard Hot Dance Club Play	1
US Billboard Hot Soul Singles	1
US Cash Box	19
US Record World	23

1987 weekly chart performance for "And the Beat Goes On"
Chart (1987)	Peak position
Belgium (Ultratop 50 Flanders)	26
France (SNEP)	39

=== Year-end charts ===
Year-end chart performance for "And the Beat Goes On"
Chart (1980)	Rank
US Billboard Hot Soul Singles	5

== Other notable versions ==
- In 1996, Lorenza released a dance club version of the song that reached number 87 in Germany.
- In 2024, the song was remixed with Celine Dion's 2002 single "I'm Alive" by Majestic and the Jammin Kid. The single, titled "Set My Heart on Fire" reached number 39 on the UK singles chart.

== In popular culture ==
The song was sampled in Monie Love's 1989 single "I Can Do This" from her debut album Down to Earth, Will Smith's 1998 single "Miami" and BigXthaPlug's 2023 single "Mmhmm". It was also featured in the 2002 video game Grand Theft Auto: Vice City.

== See also ==
- List of Billboard number-one disco singles of 1980
- List of Hot Soul Singles number ones of 1980
