= Dynasty (band) =

American band

- Origin: Los Angeles, California, U.S.
- Genres: Funk, disco, soul
- Years active: 1978–1989
- Label: SOLAR Records
- Past members: Leon Sylvers III; Nidra Beard; Linda Carriere; Kevin Spencer; William Shelby; Richard Randolph

Dynasty was an American band, based in Los Angeles, California, created by producer and SOLAR Records label head Dick Griffey, and record producer Leon Sylvers III. The band was known for their dance/pop numbers during the late 1970s and 1980s. Keyboardist Kevin Spencer and vocalists Nidra Beard and Linda Carriere originally comprised the group.

== History and overview ==
Dynasty was essentially the brainchild of Griffey and producer Sylvers, a former member of the Sylvers family group, who had achieved much popularity in the early to mid-1970s. A principal architect of the SOLAR sound, Sylvers had become the in-house producer in 1978 for the label (whose name stood for "Sound of Los Angeles Records"), and it was in this capacity that he brought the members of Dynasty together. The group consisted of three young performers: vocalists Nidra Beard and Linda Carriere and vocalist-keyboardist Kevin Spencer.

After graduating from college in New Orleans, Carriere became friends with Beard in Los Angeles during the winter of 1972. Both were frequent visitors to Maverick's Flat, a popular soul/pop nightclub. The owner of Maverick's Flat, John Daniels, was in the process of putting together a new group, DeBlanc, and both young singers became members. For two years they toured with DeBlanc throughout the major cities of Europe, Japan, Canada, and the United States. When DeBlanc broke up in 1975, some of the original members (including Beard and Carriere) formed a new group called Starfire. For one successful year, Starfire performed in the United States, Canada, Europe, with a few key dates in Finland and Iran in 1976. After the tour the group decided to disband. Around this time Beard developed a strong relationship with Leon Sylvers. She was, at that time, performing with the Sylvers as a fill-in on live dates for the female family members of the group who were minors. This new association proved beneficial to both Beard and Carriere, as Sylvers introduced each to Griffey. Spencer first met Leon Sylvers when he appeared at the Sylvers' Palos Verdes home, unannounced, to audition as the bass player for the group. It was that introduction, coupled with Spencer's performance dates with the Sylvers, that cemented what both Sylvers and Griffey wanted for their new group. Work then began on Dynasty's first album.

Dynasty's debut album, Your Piece of the Rock, released in 1979, yielded the band's first R&B hit, "I Don't Want to Be a Freak (But I Can't Help Myself)". The track peaked at No. 20 in the UK Singles Chart in late '79. Adventures in the Land of Music, released in 1980, was Dynasty's second album. The set contained their biggest hit, "I've Just Begun to Love You" (which peaked at No. 6 on the US Billboard R&B chart; No. 87 on the US Billboard Hot 100; and No. 51 in the UK), as well as the songs "Do Me Right" and "Groove Control." The three songs combined to reach number five on the US Dance chart. The album's title track would eventually provide the key samples for Camp Lo's "Luchini, AKA This Is It," Angie Stone's "Lovers' Ghetto," Terri Walker's "This Is My Time," Tha' Rayne's "Kiss Me," Brooke Valentine's "Long as You Come Home," Rashad's "Sweet Misery," Antiloop's "Catch Me," Jadakiss's "How I Feel," HaLo's "Follow Me," Rushden & Diamonds' "Lil' Bits," DSP's "Tisztelet a Kivételnek," and Wiz Khalifa's "Won't Land."

Sylvers joined the group in 1981, but his presence did not elevate their success. That year they released their third album, The Second Adventure. Although it did produce two top 40 R&B hits, "Here I Am" and "Love in the Fast Lane," the album was largely overlooked. Sylvers and Beard were briefly married during the early 1980s.

Right Back at Cha! (1982) generated two U.S. singles, "Check It Out" and "Strokin'." Only "Check It Out" saw chart action, though, and the album peaked halfway up the Billboard 200. SOLAR released two separate singles in the UK, "The Only One" and "Does That Ring a Bell"; the latter reached No. 53 on the UK Singles Chart. The band returned again in 1986 with the album Daydreamin' , but by this time Carriere was no longer part of the group and Nidra Beard was using her Sylvers surname. Dynasty's final studio release was 1988's Out of Control, but the hit singles had dried up. Out of Control has the same cover as Daydreamin' and includes several of the same tracks. Even though new SOLAR producers L.A. Reid and Babyface were brought in for Out of Control, the group could not revive their earlier glory and disbanded soon afterwards. However, they would later appear as backing vocalists on gospel artist and labelmate Juanita G. Hines's 1994 album Jesus, My Wonderful Friend.

Beard, who had cowritten much of Dynasty's material, continued as a songwriter. Her songs appear on albums by Shalamar, the Whispers, 7th Wonder, 911, and LaRue. Carriere continued as a background vocalist, while keyboardist-singer Spencer returned to studio work and can be heard on recordings by Carrie Lucas, Shalamar, the Whispers, Tin Harris, and Gladys Knight & the Pips. Sylvers went on to have a successful career as a producer and songwriter for such artists as Howard Hewett, Ahmad Jamal, the Brothers Johnson, Glenn Jones, and Blackstreet.

Canadian independent record label Unidisc Music Inc. has reissued most of Dynasty's albums on CD.

Keyboardist William Shelby died on October 27, 2021, at the age of 65. Vocalist Nidra Beard died from cancer in December 2023, at the age of 71. Kevin Spencer died on September 17, 2026, at the age of 71.

== Band members (listed alphabetically) ==
- Nidra Beard – vocals (d. 2023)
- Linda Carriere – vocals
- Wayne Milstein – percussion
- Wardell Potts Jr. – drums
- Richard Randolph – guitar
- Ernest Pepper Reed – guitar (d. 1999)
- William Shelby – keyboards/vocals (d. 2021)
- Ricky Smith – keyboards
- Kevin Spencer – keyboard synths/vocals (d. 2026)
- Leon Sylvers III – bass

== Discography ==
=== Albums ===
- Your Piece of the Rock (1979)
- Adventures in the Land of Music (1980)
- The Second Adventure (1981)
- Right Back at Cha! (1982)
- Daydreamin' (1986)
- Out of Control (1988)

=== Singles ===
| Year | Title | Peak chart positions | | | |
| Year | Title | US R&B | US Dance | US Pop | UK |
|---|---|---|---|---|---|
| 1979 | "Your Piece of the Rock" | ― | — | — | — |
| 1979 | "Satisfied" | — | 38 | — | — |
| 1979 | "When You Feel Like Giving Love (Dial My Number)" | — | ― | ― | — |
| 1979 | "I Don't Want to Be a Freak (But I Can't Help Myself)" | 36 | 38 | — | 20 |
| 1980 | "Do Me Right" | 34 | ― | ― | — |
| 1980 | "I've Just Begun to Love You" | 6 | 5 | 87 | 51 |
| 1980 | "Adventures in the Land of Music" | — | — | — | — |
| 1980 | "Something to Remember / Groove Control" | 64 | — | — | — |
| 1981 | "Here I Am" | 26 | 51 | ― | — |
| 1981 | "Love in the Fast Lane" | 31 | ― | — | — |
| 1982 | "Check It Out" | 39 | ― | — | — |
| 1982 | "Strokin'" | 52 | ― | ― | — |
| 1983 | "Does That Ring a Bell" | ― | ― | — | 53 |
| 1988 | "Don't Waste My Time" | 41 | ― | — | — |
| 1988 | "Tell Me (Do You Want My Love?)" | 56 | ― | ― | — |
"—" denotes releases that did not chart or were not released in that territory.

=== Compilations ===
- The Best of Dynasty (1994)
- Greatest Hits (2003)
