= The Whispers =

American rhythm and blues group

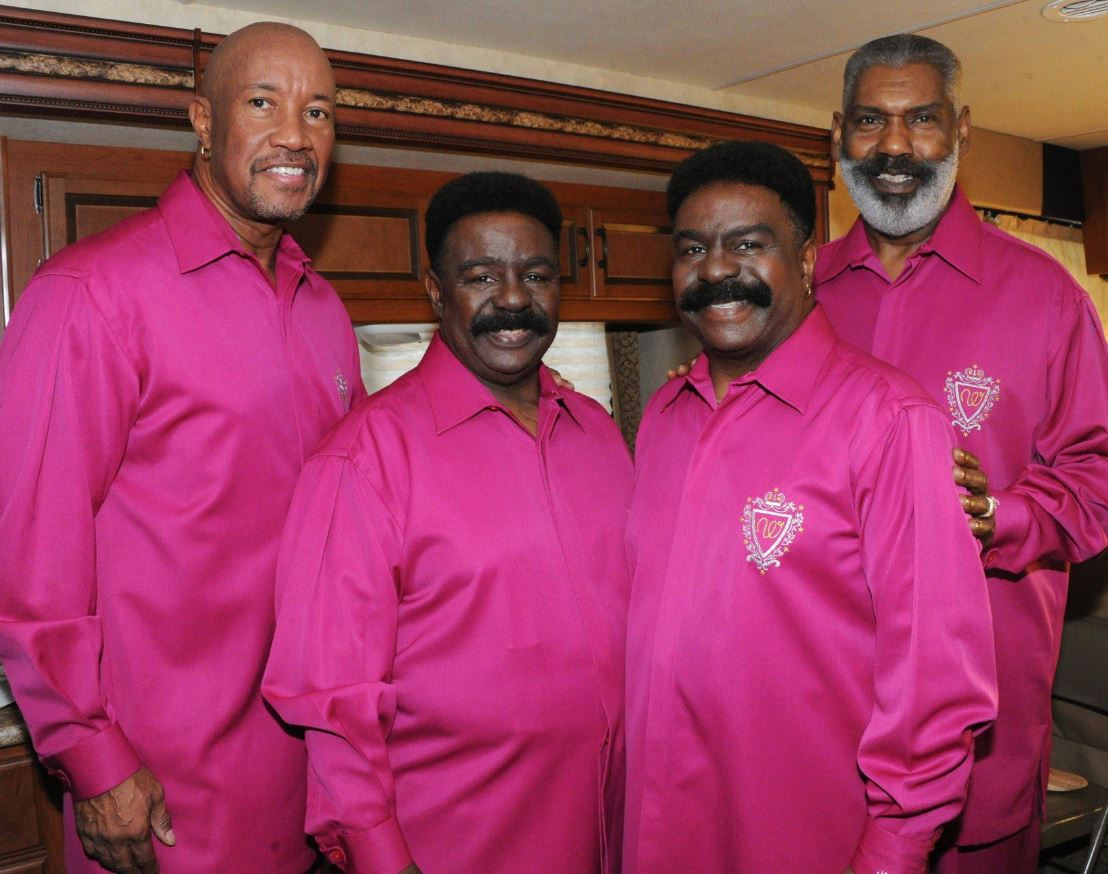
- The Whispers at Gardner's Basin in Atlantic City on August 24, 2013

Background information
- Origin: Fresno, California, U.S.
- Genres: R&B, soul, disco
- Years active: 1963–present
- Labels: Soul Clock; Janus; Solar; Capitol
- Members: Wallace Scott; Leaveil Degree
- Past members: Marcus Hutson; Gordy Harmon; Nicholas Caldwell; Walter Scott

The Whispers are an American vocal group from Fresno, California. Scoring hit records since the late 1960s, they are best known for their two number-one R&B singles, "And the Beat Goes On" in 1979 and "Rock Steady" in 1987. The Whispers scored 15 top-ten R&B singles, and 8 top-ten R&B albums with two of them, The Whispers and Love Is Where You Find It, reaching the No. 1 spot. They have earned two platinum and five gold albums by the RIAA.

== Career ==
The Whispers formed in 1963 in Watts, California. Original members included identical twin brothers Wallace "Scotty" and Walter Scott, along with Gordy Harmon, Marcus Hutson, and Nicholas Caldwell. After being invited to the San Francisco Bay Area in 1966 by Sly Stone, the group relocated to that area where they began developing a reputation as a show-stopping live act. Walter Scott was drafted to serve in the Vietnam War during that period for eighteen months, returning to the group in 1969 after discharge. After Harmon injured his larynx in a driving accident in 1973, he was replaced by former Friends of Distinction member Leaveil Degree.

After a series of singles on Los Angeles-based label Dore, the group signed to small L.A. label Soul Clock, run by producer Ron Carson, who was responsible for their breakthrough hit "Seems Like I Got to Do Wrong" in 1970. Moving to the larger New York-based Janus label, they continued to be produced by Carson, before he sold all of his master recordings to Janus, with the group then recording mainly in Philadelphia in the mid-1970s.

In 1978, the group signed to Dick Griffey's SOLAR Records. They hit No. 1 on the Hot Dance Club Play chart in 1979-80 with "And the Beat Goes On"/"Can You Do the Boogie"/"Out the Box". In the UK, "And the Beat Goes On" peaked at No. 2 and "It's a Love Thing" became their second top 10 in 1981 peaking at No. 9. In 1987, their song "Rock Steady" reached No. 7 on the US Billboard Hot 100, No. 10 on the US Cash Box Top 100 and No. 1 on the Billboard R&B chart.

The Whispers later established their own production company, Satin Tie Productions, through which they released their independent 2006 album For Your Ears Only.

The group opened Game 2 of the 1989 World Series at Oakland–Alameda County Coliseum with their rendition of the National Anthem.

Marcus Hutson left the group in 1992 due to prostate cancer. According to the Whispers' website, when Hutson succumbed to it on May 23, 2000, they vowed to never replace him, and started performing as a quartet.

Jerry McNeil resigned from his position as the keyboardist in the latter part of 1993 in order to spend more time with his family.

In 2014, the Whispers were inducted into the National Rhythm and Blues Hall of Fame.

The Philadelphia soul songwriter team of Allan Felder, Norman Harris, Bunny Sigler, and Ronnie Baker provided several of the Whispers' songs, including "A Mother for My Children" and "Bingo."

Nicholas Caldwell died of congestive heart failure at his San Francisco home on January 5, 2016, at the age of 71.

Founding member Gordy Harmon died at his home in Los Angeles on January 5, 2023, at the age of 79.

Founding member Walter Scott died after a brief illness on June 26, 2025, at the age of 81, leaving Wallace Scott as the last surviving original member.

== Awards and recognition ==
- March 18, 1980 – RIAA Gold Record for the single "And the Beat Goes On".
- March 18, 1980 – The Whispers earned RIAA Gold & Platinum status for their album, "The Whispers".
- March 12, 1981 – The Whispers earned a RIAA Gold Album for their recording of "Imagination".
- November 9, 1982 – The album "Love Is Where You Find It" became their third RIAA Gold Album.
- July 20, 1987 – The Whispers received a RIAA Gold Album for their recording of, "Just Gets Better with Time".
- February 9, 1988 – The Whispers received a RIAA Platinum Album for their recording of "Just Gets Better with Time".
- May 24, 1991 – The Whispers received a RIAA Gold Album for their recording of "More of the Night".
- 2002 – The Whispers were honored with an NAACP Image Award.
- 2003 – The Whispers were inducted into the Vocal Group Hall of Fame.
- 2005 – The San Francisco Chapter of the Grammy Awards presented the Whispers with the prestigious Governors Award, the highest honor bestowed by an Academy Chapter.
- 2007 – The Whispers were presented with an American Black Music Award in Las Vegas.
- 2008 – The Whispers were winners of the Rhythm and Blues Foundation's prestigious Pioneer Award.
- 2012 – Soul Music Hall Of Fame Award.
- 2013 – Presented a Lifetime Achievement Award for their 50 years in the Music Industry on the Soul Train Cruise.
- 2014 – The Whispers were inducted into the National Rhythm and Blues Hall of Fame.

== Band members and directors ==
=== Current members ===
- Wallace "Scotty" Scott (born September 23, 1943, Fort Worth, Texas) (1963–present)
- Leaveil Degree (born July 31, 1948, New Orleans, Louisiana) (1973–present)

=== Former members ===
- Marcus Hutson (born January 8, 1943, St. Louis, Missouri; died May 23, 2000) (1963–1992)
- Gordy Harmon (born 1943; died January 5, 2023, Los Angeles, California) (1963–1973)
- Nicholas Caldwell (born April 5, 1944, Loma Linda, California; died January 5, 2016, San Francisco, California) (1963–2016)
- Walter Scott (born September 23, 1943, Fort Worth, Texas; died June 26, 2025, Los Angeles, California) (1963–2025)

=== Former musical directors ===
- Grady "G" Wilkins, Jr. – musician, writer, producer, vocalist, keyboardist and musical director of the Whispers (born December 30, 1955, San Francisco, California; died December 19, 2013)
- Fulton L. Tashombe – musician, vocalist, composer, arranger, producer, sound engineer, music educator, actor, keyboardist and musical director of Headlights (born January 7, 1950, San Francisco, California; died October 14, 2017)
- Robert "Cass" Harris – first band director

=== Supporting musicians ===
- Emilio Conesa – musical director/guitar
- John Valentino – saxophone
- Dewayne Sweet – keyboards
- Richard Aguon – drums
- Magic Mendez – producer, bass, guitar, keyboards, vocalist
- Harmony Blackwell – playback engineer, background vocals
- Tim Gant – keyboards
- Mio Flores – percussionist

== See also ==
- List of number-one dance hits (United States)
- List of artists who reached number one on the US Dance chart
