= Shalamar discography =

Shalamar has sold over 25 million records worldwide. The following is the discography of the band Shalamar:

== Albums ==
=== Studio albums ===
| Year | Album details | Peak chart positions | | | | | Certifications |
| Year | Album details | US | US R&B | AUS | NLD | UK | Certifications |
|---|---|---|---|---|---|---|---|
| 1977 | Uptown Festival: First studio album; Release date: April 12, 1977; Label: Soul Train Records | 48 | 22 | 27 | — | — | |
| 1978 | Disco Gardens: Second studio album; Release date: August 28, 1978; Label: SOLAR Records | 171 | 52 | — | — | — | |
| 1979 | Big Fun: Third studio album; Release date: August 30, 1979; Label: SOLAR Records | 23 | 4 | — | — | — | RIAA: Gold |
| 1980 | Three for Love: Fourth studio album; Release date: November 1, 1980; Label: SOLAR Records | 40 | 8 | — | — | — | RIAA: Gold |
| 1981 | Go for It: Fifth studio album; Release date: August 28, 1981; Label: SOLAR Records | 115 | 18 | — | — | — | |
| 1982 | Friends: Sixth studio album; Release date: January 29, 1982; Label: SOLAR Records | 35 | 1 | — | 32 | 6 | RIAA: Gold; BPI: Platinum |
| 1983 | The Look: Seventh studio album; Release date: July 11, 1983; Label: SOLAR Records | 79 | 13 | — | 50 | 7 | BPI: Gold |
| 1984 | Heartbreak: Eighth studio album; Release date: November 30, 1984; Label: SOLAR Records | 90 | 32 | — | — | — | |
| 1987 | Circumstantial Evidence: Ninth studio album; Release date: June 13, 1987; Label: SOLAR Records | — | 29 | — | — | — | |
| 1990 | Wake Up: Tenth studio album; Release date: August 24, 1990; Label: SOLAR Records | — | — | — | — | — | |
"—" denotes releases that did not chart or were not released in that territory.

=== Compilation albums ===
| Year | Album | Peak chart positions | | Certifications | Record label |
| Year | Album | US R&B | UK | Certifications | Record label |
|---|---|---|---|---|---|
| 1982 | Greatest Hits | 48 | 71 | | Solar |
| 1986 | The Greatest Hits | — | 5 | BPI: Gold | Stylus |
| 1995 | The Very Best of | — | — | | Castle Communications |
| 1999 | Greatest Hits | — | — | | The Right Stuff |
| 2006 | Ultimate Collection | — | — | | Capitol |
| 2019 | Gold | — | 60 | | Crimson |
"—" denotes releases that did not chart or were not released in that territory.

== Singles ==
| Year | Single | Peak chart positions | | | | | | | | | Certifications | Album |
| Year | Single | US | US R&B | US Dan | AUS | CAN | IRE | NLD | NZ | UK | Certifications | Album |
|---|---|---|---|---|---|---|---|---|---|---|---|---|
| 1977 | "Uptown Festival (Part 1)" | 25 | 10 | 2 | 20 | 69 | — | 15 | — | 30 | | Uptown Festival |
| 1977 | "Ooh Baby, Baby" | — | 59 | — | — | — | — | — | — | — | | Uptown Festival |
| 1978 | "Take That to the Bank" | 79 | 11 | — | — | — | — | — | — | 20 | | Disco Gardens |
| 1978 | "Stay Close to Love" | — | — | — | — | — | — | — | — | — | | Disco Gardens |
| 1979 | "The Second Time Around" | 8 | 1 | 1 | 96 | 49 | — | 17 | 6 | 45 | RIAA: Gold | Big Fun |
| 1980 | "Right in the Socket" | — | 22 | 11 | — | — | — | — | — | 44 | | Big Fun |
| 1980 | "I Owe You One" | — | 60 | — | — | — | — | — | — | 13 | | Big Fun |
| 1980 | "Full of Fire" | 55 | 24 | 15 | — | — | — | — | — | — | | Three for Love |
| 1981 | "Make That Move" | 60 | 6 | 15 | — | — | — | — | — | 30 | | Three for Love |
| 1981 | "This Is for the Lover in You" | — | 17 | — | — | — | — | — | — | — | | Three for Love |
| 1981 | "Sweeter as the Days Go By" | — | 19 | — | — | — | — | — | — | — | | Go for It |
| 1981 | "Talk to Me" | — | — | — | — | — | — | — | — | — | | Go for It |
| 1982 | "A Night to Remember" | 44 | 8 | 15 | — | — | 9 | — | — | 5 | BPI: Silver | Friends |
| 1982 | "I Can Make You Feel Good" | 102 | 33 | — | — | — | 18 | 10 | — | 7 | BPI: Silver | Friends |
| 1982 | "There It Is" | — | — | — | — | — | 6 | — | — | 5 | BPI: Silver | Friends |
| 1982 | "Friends" | — | — | — | — | — | 15 | — | — | 12 | | Friends |
| 1983 | "Dead Giveaway" | 22 | 10 | 18 | — | — | 8 | — | — | 8 | | The Look |
| 1983 | "Disappearing Act" | — | — | — | — | — | 13 | — | — | 18 | | The Look |
| 1983 | "Over and Over" | — | 26 | — | — | — | 24 | — | — | 23 | | The Look |
| 1984 | "Deadline U.S.A." | — | 34 | — | — | — | — | — | — | 52 | | D.C. Cab |
| 1984 | "You Can Count on Me" | 101 | 77 | — | — | — | — | — | — | — | | The Look |
| 1984 | "Dancing in the Sheets" | 17 | 18 | 9 | 68 | — | — | — | 8 | 41 | | Footloose / Heartbreak |
| 1984 | "Amnesia" | 73 | 49 | — | — | — | — | — | — | 61 | | Heartbreak |
| 1985 | "My Girl Loves Me" | 106 | 22 | 25 | — | — | — | — | — | 45 | | Heartbreak |
| 1985 | "Don't Get Stopped in Beverly Hills" | — | 79 | — | — | — | — | — | — | — | | Beverly Hills Cop / Heartbreak |
| 1985 | "Just One of the Guys" | — | — | — | — | — | — | — | — | — | | Just One of the Guys |
| 1986 | "A Night to Remember" (The M&M Mix!) | — | — | — | — | — | — | — | — | 52 | | —N/a |
| 1986 | "Take That to the Bank" (The M&M Mix!) | — | — | — | — | — | — | — | — | 87 | | —N/a |
| 1987 | "Circumstantial Evidence" | — | 30 | — | — | — | — | — | — | — | | Circumstantial Evidence |
| 1987 | "Games" | — | 11 | — | — | — | — | — | — | — | | Circumstantial Evidence |
| 1988 | "I Want You (To Be My Playthang)" | — | — | — | — | — | — | — | — | — | | Circumstantial Evidence |
| 1990 | "Caution: This Love Is Hot!" | — | — | — | — | — | — | — | — | — | | Wake Up |
| 1990 | "Wake Up" | — | — | — | — | — | — | — | — | — | | Wake Up |
| 1991 | "Come Together" | — | — | — | — | — | — | — | — | — | | Wake Up |
| 2017 | "The Real Thing" | — | — | — | — | — | — | — | — | — | | Non-album single |
"—" denotes releases that did not chart or were not released in that territory.
