= Leon Sylvers III production discography =

The following list catalogs song-writing and production credits for Leon Sylvers III. Sylvers began his career as a member of the group, The Sylvers. His production career took off in 1978 when he became the in house producer for SOLAR Records.

== Writer credits ==
=== As writer (not as producer) ===
Year	Artist	Album	Track(s)	Label
1972	The Sylvers	The Sylvers	"Wish That I Could Talk to You", "Fools Paradise", "Only One Can Win", "I Know Myself", "Chaos", "So Close", "How Love Hurts"	Pride/MGM
1973	The Sylvers	The Sylvers II	"We Can Make It If We Try", "Through the Love in My Heart", "Handle It", "I'll Never Let You Go", "Cry of a Dreamer", "Stay Away from Me", "I Don't Need to Prove Myself", "Love Me, Love Me Not", "I Remember"	Pride/MGM
1973	Foster Sylvers	Foster Sylvers	"Misdemeanor"	Pride/MGM
1974	The Sylvers	The Sylvers III	"Even This Shall Pass", "Am I Truly Yours"	Pride/MGM
1975	The Sylvers	Showcase	"Free Style", "I Can Be for Real", "Clap Your Hands to the Music", "Ain't Nothin' But a Party"	Capitol Records
1976	The Sylvers	Something Special	"Got to Have You (For My Very Own)", "High School Dance", "That's What Love Is Made Of", "Disco Showdown"	Capitol Records
1980	Gene Page featuring Charmaine Sylvers	Love Starts After Dark	"Love Starts After Dark"	Arista Records
1981	Wax	Do You Believe in Magic	"The Right Time For Us"	RCA Records
1983	Real to Reel	"Love Me Like This" 12" Single	"Taking the Long Way Home"	Arista Records
1985	Rockie Robbins	Rockie Robbins (1985)	"Goodbyes Don't Last Forever", "You Finally Found the One"	MCA Records
1986	Howard Hewett	I Commit to Love	"I Commit to Love"	Elektra Records
1987	Lakeside	Power	"Love I Can Bank On"	SOLAR Records
1987	Royalty	Rich and Famous	"If You've Got the Heart (I've Got the Love)"	Warner Bros. Records
1994	Blackstreet	Blackstreet	"Before I Let You Go" "Happy Home" "Give You All My Lovin", "Wanna Make Love"	Interscope Records
1994	New Kids on the Block	Face the Music	"Girls", "Never Let You Go"	Columbia Records

== Production credits ==
Year	Artist	Album	Label	Tracks produced
1978	The Sylvers	Forever Yours	Casablanca Records	Entire album
1978	Shalamar	Disco Gardens	SOLAR Records	Entire album
1978	Lakeside	Shot of Love	SOLAR Records	Entire album
1979	Shalamar	Big Fun	SOLAR Records	Entire album
1979	Dynasty	Your Piece of the Rock	SOLAR Records	Entire album
1979	Lakeside	Rough Riders	SOLAR Records	Entire album
1980	Shalamar	Three for Love	SOLAR Records	Entire album
1980	Dynasty	Adventures in the Land of Music	SOLAR Records	Entire album
1980	7th Wonder	Thunder	Chocolate City Records	"The Tilt"
1980	Midnight Star	The Beginning	SOLAR Records	"Make It Last"
1980	Carrie Lucas	Portrait of Carrie	SOLAR Records	"It's Not What You Got (It's How You Use It)", "Career Girl", "Fashion"
1981	Shalamar	Go for It	SOLAR Records	Entire album
1981	The Sylvers	Concept	SOLAR Records	Entire album
1981	Dynasty	The Second Adventure	SOLAR Records	Entire album
1981	The Whispers	Love Is Where You Find It	SOLAR Records	"In the Raw", "Turn Me Out", "Cruisin' In", "Emergency"
1981	Midnight Star	Standing Together	SOLAR Records	Entire album
1982	Shalamar	Friends	SOLAR Records	Entire album
1982	Dynasty	Right Back at Cha!	SOLAR Records	Entire album except for "The Only One"
1983	Shalamar	The Look	SOLAR Records	Entire album
1983	The Whispers	Love for Love	SOLAR Records	"Tonight", "Keep On Lovin’ Me", "Keep Your Love Around"
1983	Evelyn "Champagne" King	Face to Face	RCA Records	"Action", "Shake Down", "Tell Me Something Good", "Makin' Me So Proud", "Givin' You My Love (What Cha Gonna Do With It)"
1983	Tavares	Words and Music	RCA Records	"Ten to One"
1983	Real to Reel	"Love Me Like This" 12" Single	Arista Records	"Love Me Like This"
1984	The Whispers	So Good	SOLAR Records	"Sweet Sensation", "On Impact", "So Good"
1984	The Brothers Johnson	Out of Control	A&M Records	Entire album
1984	The Spinners	Cross Fire	Atlantic Records	"Keep On Keepin' On", "Not Just Another Lover," "Love Is in Season", "Secrets"
1984	Krystol	Gettin' Ready	Epic Records	Entire album except for two tracks
1984	Glenn Jones	Finesse	RCA Records	"Finesse", "It Hurts Too Much", "Meet Me Halfway There", "Bring Back Your Love", "On the Floor"
1984	The Sylvers	Bizarre	Geffen Records	Entire album except for "Got To Be Crazy"
1985	Gladys Knight & the Pips	Life	Columbia Records	"Keep Givin' Me Love", "Just Let Me Love You", "Forever", "Do You Wanna Have Some Fun"
1985	Krystol	Talk of the Town	Epic Records	"Love Is Like an Itchin' in My Heart", "The Things That Men Do", "C'est La Vie", "Shattered Glass", "Talk of the Town", "Hard to Believe", "I Want a Man Who Can Dance"
1985	Lushus Daim & the Pretty Vain	More Than You Can Handle	Motown Records	"More Than You Can Handle", "The One You Love", "The Rhythm of Love", "Flex, "Pretty Poison", "For You"
1986	Dynasty	Daydreamin'	SOLAR Records	Entire album
1986	Stacy Lattisaw	Take Me All the Way	Motown Records	"You Ain’t Leavin’"
1987	The Whispers	Just Gets Better with Time	SOLAR Records	"Special F/X", "No Pain, No Gain"
1988	Five Star	Rock the World	RCA Records	"Another Weekend", "Rock My World", "Are You Really the One", "Let Me Be Yours", "Free Time", "Rescue Me"
1988	Evelyn "Champagne" King	Flirt	Manhattan Records	"Flirt", "Hold On to What You've Got", "Before the Date"
1989	Living in a Box	Gatecrashing	Chrysalis Records	"Mistaken Identity"
1990	Smokey Robinson	Love, Smokey	Motown Records	"Unless You Do It Again"
1990	Howard Hewett	Howard Hewett	Elektra Entertainment	"I Do", "The More I Get (The More I Want)"
1994	Blackstreet	Blackstreet	Interscope Records	"Givin' You All My Lovin'", "Before I Let You Go"
1997	Big Bub	Timeless	Kedar Records	"Everybody"
2000	Guy	Guy III	MCA Records	"Love Online"
2009	N'dambi	Pink Elephant	Stax Records	Entire album
