= The Soul Train Gang =

The Soul Train Gang were an American R&B vocal group. In the early 1970s, the dancers on Don Cornelius' hit television program Soul Train were called 'The Soul Train Gang'. The dancers became 'The Soul Train Dancers' in 1975 when the name 'The Soul Train Gang' was given to a R&B vocal quintet by Cornelius and Dick Griffey. They did so to announce the founding of Soul Train Records (later SOLAR Records), home to Lakeside, Shalamar, The Whispers and others.

Consisting of two brothers from Cincinnati, Ohio; Gerald Brown & Terry Brown; Judy Jones (replaced by Denise Smith in 1976), Patricia Williamson and Hollis Pippin, The Soul Train Gang recorded its debut album, Don Cornelius Presents the Soul Train Gang, in 1975. Produced by Cornelius and Griffey, the LP included "Soul Train '75," one of the many themes from Soul Train. (The previous theme had previously been MFSB's famous "TSOP (The Sound of Philadelphia)" on Philadelphia International Records.) The song peaked at 75 on the Billboard Hot 100 and 9 on the R&B chart.

The group recorded its second album, The Soul Train Gang, produced by Norman Harris and done largely in Philadelphia, in 1976. Cornelius and Griffey hoped they could use Soul Train's popularity to make The Soul Train Gang a hit. Lead single "Ooh Cha" peaked at 107 on the Bubbling Under Hot 100 chart and 62 on the R&B chart. Both albums contained a 1970s soul and funk sound but neither made them a big name in the R&B world. They subsequently released a cover of Stevie Wonder's "My Cherie Amour" which peaked at 93 on the Hot 100 and 21 on the dance chart.

After the Gang disbanded in 1977, Brown went on to join Shalamar the following year, replacing original member Gary Mumford. Brown appeared on Shalamar's second album, Disco Gardens, and the hit single "Take That to the Bank" before being replaced by Howard Hewett in 1979.
