= Heartbreak (Shalamar album) =

Studio album by Shalamar
- Released: November 12, 1984
- Recorded: 1983–1984
- Genre: Dance-pop, new wave, boogie
- Length: 40:41
- Label: SOLAR
- Producer: Howard Hewett, Hawk Wolinski, Bill Wolfer

Shalamar chronology
The Look (1983)	Heartbreak (1984)	Circumstantial Evidence (1987)

Singles from Heartbreak
- 1. "Dancing in the Sheets" Released: 1984; 2. "Amnesia" Released: 1984; 3. "My Girl Loves Me" Released: 1984

Professional ratings
Review scores
Source	Rating
Allmusic	3/5 stars
Robert Christgau	B

Heartbreak is the eighth album by American R&B group Shalamar, released in 1984 on the SOLAR label. It features a new line-up of Delisa Davis, Micki Free and Howard Hewett (Davis and Free having replaced Jeffrey Daniel and Jody Watley who had both left the group after the release of the previous album The Look). The album features "Dancing in the Sheets" from the Footloose soundtrack which was nominated for Best R&B Performance by a Duo or Group with Vocals at the 27th Grammy Awards and "Don't Get Stopped in Beverly Hills" from the Beverly Hills Cop soundtrack which won Hewett and Free a Grammy when the soundtrack won Best Album of Original Score Written for a Motion Picture or Television Special at the 28th Annual Grammy Awards. This would be Hewett's last album with the group before embarking on a solo career.

Heartbreak peaked at No. 32 on the R&B chart and No. 90 on the Billboard 200. The album was certified Gold in the United States by the RIAA for sales over 500,000.

== Track listing ==
Side one
No.	Title	Writer(s)	Length
1.	"Amnesia"	George Duke, Howard Hewett	5:32
2.	"Dancing in the Sheets"	Bill Wolfer, Dean Pitchford	4:01
3.	"Whenever You Need Me"	Delisa Davis	4:53
4.	"Heartbreak"	Fenderella, Chuck Gentry	5:27

Side two
No.	Title	Writer(s)	Length
5.	"Don't Get Stopped in Beverly Hills"	Hawk Wolinski, Howard Hewett, Micki Free	4:24
6.	"My Girl Loves Me"	Wolinski, Hewett, Free	4:41
7.	"Melody (An Erotic Affair)"	Wolinski, Hewett, Free	7:08
8.	"Deceiver"	Wolinski, Hewett, Free	4:04

=== Singles ===
Year	Single	Chart positions		
Year	Single	US Pop	US R&B	UK Pop
1984	"Dancing In The Sheets"	17	18	41
1984	"Amnesia"	73	49	61
1985	"My Girl Loves Me"	106	22	45
1985	"Don't Get Stopped In Beverly Hills"	-	79	-

== Personnel ==
- Delisa Davis - Keyboards, Vocals
- George Duke - Keyboards
- Micki Free - Guitar, Guitar (Rhythm), Guitar (Synthesizer), Vocals
- Chuck Gentry - Guitar, Keyboards, Sequencing Programmer, Vocals, Vocals (Background)
- Mitch Gibson - Assistant Engineer
- Hawk Wolinski - Drum Programming, Guitar, Keyboards, Synthesizer
- Howard Hewett - Vocals, Vocals (Background)
- Joyce "Fenderella" Irby - Vocals, Vocals (Background)
- Paul Jackson, Jr. - Guitar
- John "J.R." Robinson - Percussion
- Barry Sarna - Keyboards
- Ernie Watts - Saxophone
- David Williams - Guitar, Guitar (Rhythm)
- Bill Wolfer - Keyboards, Synthesizer
- William "Dr. Z." Zimmerman - Sequencing Programmer
