= Circumstantial Evidence (album) =

Studio album by Shalamar
- Released: June 19, 1987
- Recorded: 1986
- Studio: Galaxy Sound Studios, Hollywood, Silverlake Studio, Hollywood
- Genre: Dance-pop, urban
- Length: 38:11
- Label: SOLAR
- Producer: L.A. Reid, Babyface, Jerry Peters, Bernadette Cooper

Shalamar chronology
Heartbreak (1984)	Circumstantial Evidence (1987)	Wake Up (1990)

Singles from Circumstantial Evidence
- 1. "Circumstantial Evidence" Released: 1987; 2. "Games" Released: 1987; 3. "Playthang" Released: 1988

Professional ratings
Review scores
Source	Rating
Allmusic	2/5 stars

Circumstantial Evidence is the ninth album by American R&B group Shalamar, produced by L.A. Reid, Babyface, Jerry Peters, and Klymaxx founding member Bernadette Cooper. Released in 1987 on the SOLAR label. The line-up on this album is Delisa Davis, Micki Free and Sydney Justin, the latter having replaced Howard Hewett, who had left the group in 1986 to pursue a solo career.

Circumstantial Evidence peaked at number 29 on the R&B chart but failed to register on the Billboard chart.

== Track listing ==
Side one
No.	Title	Writer(s)	Length
1.	"Circumstantial Evidence"	Babyface, L.A.	4:52
2.	"Games"	Charles Muldrow, Sid Johnson, Bruce Robinson, Jeffrey Wilson	6:09
3.	"Love's Grown Deep"	Kenny Nolan	4:41
4.	"Playthang"	L.A., Babyface, Sid Johnson, Stephen Page	4:07

Side two
No.	Title	Writer(s)	Length
5.	"Female"	Bernadette Cooper	4:58
6.	"Born 2 Love"	Delisa Davis, Michael Wells	3:49
7.	"Worth Waitin' 4"	Jerry Peters	5:27
8.	"Imaginary Love"	Etienne	4:08

== Personnel ==
- Micki Free - vocals, lead guitar, rhythm guitar
- Sydney Justin - vocals, keyboards, electric guitar
- Delisa Davis - vocals, keyboards
- Babyface - keyboards, rhythm guitar, backing vocals
- Kayo - bass, backing vocals
- L.A. - drums (all tracks, except "Female" and "Worth Waitin' For")
- Bernadette Cooper - bass, drums, keyboards ("Female"); rap ("Imaginary Love")
- Jerry Peters - bass, keyboards, drums ("Worth Waitin' For")
- Gerald Albright - saxophone ("Worth Waitin' For")
- Michael Hightower - drums, keyboards, programming ("Female")
- "Roman" Jordan - keyboards ("Female")
- Larry Leeds - programming ("Female")
- Eddie M - saxophone ("Playthang")
- Craig Cooper - guitar, drums, synthesizer ("Worth Waitin' For")
- Hami Dair - guitar ("Imaginary Love")
- Etienne - keyboards, bass ("Imaginary Love")
- Pebbles - backing vocals
- Melvin Edmonds - backing vocals
- Debra Hurd - backing vocals
- Dee Bristol - backing vocals

=== Singles ===
Year	Single	Chart positions		
Year	Single	US Pop	US R&B	UK Pop
1987	"Circumstantial Evidence"	-	30	-
1987	"Games"	-	11	-
