= Uptown Festival =

Studio album by Shalamar
- Released: April 12, 1977
- Studio: Wally Heider Studios, The Sound Factory
- Genre: Disco, R&B
- Length: 38:30
- Label: Soul Train Records
- Producer: Dick Griffey, Don Cornelius, Simon Soussan

Shalamar chronology
Uptown Festival (1977)	Disco Gardens (1978)

Singles from Uptown Festival
- 1. "Uptown Festival (song)" Released: March 1977; 2. "Ooo Baby Baby" Released: August 1977

Professional ratings
Review scores
Source	Rating
AllMusic	2/5 stars
Pitchfork	4.2/10

Uptown Festival is the debut album by American R&B group Shalamar, released in 1977 on the Soul Train label. The album was in fact recorded by session singers. It peaked at No. 22 on the US R&B chart and No. 48 on the Billboard albums chart.

The title track, "Uptown Festival" was recorded at Ike & Tina Turner's Bolic Sound studio. It's a medley of ten Motown classics sung over a 1970s disco beat. The single was a hit in both the US and the UK.

== Singles ==
Two singles were released from the album:

- "Uptown Festival" (US Hot 100 #25, US R&B #10, Australia #20, UK #30)
- "Ooo Baby Baby" (US R&B #59)

== Track listing ==
Side one
No.	Title	Writer(s)	Length
1.	"Inky Dinky Wang Dang Doo"	Norma Toney, Andre Williams	4:04
2.	"Beautiful Night"	Jimmy Thomas	5:20
3.	"Uptown Festival" ("Going to a Go-Go" / "I Can't Help Myself (Sugar Pie Honey Bunch)" / "Uptight (Everything's Alright)" / "Stop! In the Name of Love" / "It's the Same Old Song" / "The Tears of a Clown" / "Love Is Like an Itching in My Heart" / "This Old Heart of Mine (Is Weak for You)" / "Baby Love" / "He Was Really Saying Somethin'")	Smokey Robinson, Bobby Rogers, Marvin Tarplin, Pete Moore / Holland–Dozier–Holland / Stevie Wonder, Henry Cosby, Sylvia Moy / Holland–Dozier–Holland / Holland–Dozier–Holland / Smokey Robinson, Stevie Wonder, Hank Cosby / Holland–Dozier–Holland / Holland–Dozier–Holland, Sylvia Moy / Holland–Dozier–Holland / Norman Whitfield, William "Mickey" Stevenson, Eddie Holland	8:52

Side two
No.	Title	Writer(s)	Length
4.	"High on Life"	Don Cornelius	3:42
5.	"Ooh Baby, Baby"	Smokey Robinson, Pete Moore	3:48
6.	"You Know"	Don Cornelius	3:59
7.	"Forever Came Today"	Holland–Dozier–Holland	5:55

== Charts ==
Chart (1977)	Peak position
Australia (Kent Music Report)	27
