= Griffey =

Griffey is an anglicisation of the Irish Gaelic surname Uí Ghríofa. This surname was also anglicised to Griffy and Griffin.

Griffey may refer to:

- Anthony Dean Griffey (born 1970), American operatic tenor
- Carolyn Griffey, American soul vocalist and member of the soul funk group Shalamar
- Dan Griffey (born 1970), American politician
- Dick Griffey (1938–2010), American record producer and promoter, father of Carolyn Griffey
- Ken Griffey Jr. (born 1969), former Major League Baseball player
- Ken Griffey Sr. (born 1950), former Major League Baseball player, father of Ken Griffey Jr.
