= Go for It (Shalamar album) =

Studio album by Shalamar
- Released: August 28, 1981
- Recorded: 1979–1980
- Studio: Studio Masters, Los Angeles, CA
- Genre: R&B, pop
- Length: 39:03
- Label: SOLAR
- Producer: Leon Sylvers III

Shalamar chronology
Three for Love (1980)	Go for It (1981)	Friends (1982)

Go for It is the fifth album by American R&B group Shalamar, released in 1981 on the SOLAR label. The album features the 'classic' Shalamar line-up (Jeffrey Daniel, Howard Hewett and Jody Watley).

Daniel has confirmed that Go For It and Friends were recorded at the same time. For distribution purposes, SOLAR was in the process of leaving RCA Records and joining Elektra Records, but still owed a final Shalamar album to RCA: Go for It was that album, while Friends became the first to be delivered to WEA. Go for It received indifferent promotion from RCA, and the garish cover-art was also the subject of negative comment. Only one single ("Sweeter as the Days Go By") was issued, and the album peaked at No. 18 on the R&B chart and No. 115 on the Billboard chart.

In 2002, Go for It was re-released by Sanctuary Records in the United Kingdom in a double CD package with Friends.

== Critical reception ==
Professional ratings
Review scores
Source	Rating
AllMusic	2.5/5 stars
Robert Christgau	A−
The Rolling Stone Album Guide	4/5 stars

The Rolling Stone Album Guide deemed Go for It "a remarkably wide-ranging pop album."

== Track listing ==
Side one
No.	Title	Writer(s)	Length
1.	"Go for It"	Jeffrey Daniel	5:29
2.	"Appeal"	Jeffrey Daniel	5:20
3.	"The Final Analysis"	Jeffrey Daniel	3:23
4.	"You've Got Me Running"	Howard Hewett, James Ingram	3:57

Side two
No.	Title	Writer(s)	Length
1.	"Sweeter as the Days Go By"	Linda Carriere, Ricky Smith	3:47
2.	"Talk to Me"	Glen Barbee, Jody Watley	6:14
3.	"Good Feelings"	William Shelby, Howard Hewett, Wardell Potts, Jr.	4:20
4.	"Rocker"	Jeffrey Daniel	6:57

== Personnel ==
Shalamar

- Jeffrey Daniel – lead & backing vocals
- Howard Hewett – lead & backing vocals
- Jody Watley – lead & backing vocals

Musical personnel

- Bass – Jeffrey Daniel, Ernest Biles, James Davis, Leon Sylvers III
- Cello – Christine Ermacoff, Edgar Lustgarten, Harry Shlutz, Marie Fera
- Clavinet – Kevin Spencer, William Shelby
- Congas – Greg "Popeye" Dawkins
- Drums – Freeman Brown, Gerald Thompson, Wardell Potts
- Fender Rhodes electric piano – Kossi Gardner, William Shelby
- Guitar – Ernest Reed, Fred Rheimert, Steve Shockley
- Keyboards – "Gip" Nobels, Gene Dozier, Joey Gallo, John Barnes, Kevin Spencer, Kossi Gardner, Ron Artists, William Shelby
- Organ – Kossi Gardner
- Percussion – Fred Lewis, Greg "Popeye" Dawkins, Leon Sylvers III
- Violin – Brian Leanord, David Johnson, Jerry Vinci, Ilkka Talvi, Irma Newman, Norman Carr, Norman Leonard, Reginald Hill, Ronald Fulsom, Sheldon Sanou

== Charts ==
=== Album ===
Year	Chart	Position
1981	U.S. Album Chart	115
1981	Top R&B/Black Albums	18

=== Single ===
Year	Single	Chart	Position
1981	Sweeter as the Days Go By	Hot Soul Singles	19
