= Griffel =

Griffel is a surname. Notable people with the surname include:

- Enn Griffel (1935–2007), Estonian auto racing driver
- Kay Griffel (born 1940), American opera singer

== See also ==
- Griffey
