= Dancing in the Sheets =

Single by Shalamar

from the album Footloose: Original Soundtrack of the Paramount Motion Picture and Heartbreak
- B-side: "Dancing In The Sheets" (Instrumental)
- Released: 1984
- Genre: R&B; pop; freestyle
- Length: 4:05
- Label: Columbia/SOLAR
- Songwriters: Dean Pitchford; Bill Wolfer
- Producer: Bill Wolfer

Shalamar singles chronology
"You Can Count on Me" (1984)	"Dancing in the Sheets" (1984)	"Amnesia" (1984)

"Dancing in the Sheets" is a song written by Bill Wolfer and Dean Pitchford and recorded by American R&B group Shalamar. It was featured on the chart-topping soundtrack album of the 1984 motion picture Footloose and was also the first single from their Gold selling album Heartbreak, featuring the new line-up of Howard Hewett, Delisa Davis and Micki Free. A music video was made featuring the new line-up and did not feature any footage from the film.

"Dancing in the Sheets" was a top 20 hit on the Billboard charts, peaking at No. 17 on the Hot 100 and reaching No. 18 on the Hot Black singles chart. On the UK Singles Chart, the song climbed to No. 41.

An extended 12" version of the song was made available as one of four bonus tracks on the 15th Anniversary Collectors' Edition re-release of the soundtrack in 1998.

== Personnel ==
- Bill Wolfer - synthesizer
- David Williams - guitar
- Micki Free - guitar
- Howard Hewett - vocals, background vocals

== Charts ==
=== Weekly charts ===
Chart (1984)	Peak position
Australia (Kent Music Report)	68
UK Singles Chart	41
US Billboard Hot 100	17
US Billboard Hot Black Singles	18

=== Year-end charts ===
Year-end chart (1984)	Rank
US Top Pop Singles (Billboard)	92
