= Uptown Festival (song) =

1977 single by Shalamar

Single by Shalamar

from the album Uptown Festival
- B-side: "Simón's Theme (Instr.)"
- Released: March 1977
- Recorded: 1976
- Studio: Bolic Sound, Inglewood, California
- Genre: Funk, disco, R&B
- Length: 8:52 (album); 3:59 (single)
- Label: Soul Train
- Songwriters: Holland–Dozier–Holland, Smokey Robinson, Pete Moore, Bobby Rogers, Marvin Tarplin, Stevie Wonder, Sylvia Moy, Henry Cosby, Hank Cosby, Norman Whitfield, William "Mickey" Stevenson, Edward Holland, Jr.
- Producer: Simon Soussan

Shalamar singles chronology
"Uptown Festival" (1977)	"Ooo Baby Baby" (1977)

"Uptown Festival" is the debut single by the band Shalamar, released on Soul Train Records in 1977. The song is a medley of ten Motown classics sung over a 1970s disco beat. The radio edit, "Uptown Festival (Part 1)", became a hit peaking at No. 25 on the Billboard Hot 100, No. 10 on the R&B chart and No. 2 on the Dance chart. It also charted internationally. After the success of the single, Dick Griffey, the booking agent for Soul Train, formed a vocal group, resulting in the first incarnation of Shalamar with Jody Watley, Jeffrey Daniels and Gary Mumford.

== Recording and songs ==
The medley "Uptown Festival" was recorded at Ike & Tina Turner's Bolic Sound studio in Inglewood in 1976. It features various session musicians, including Mike Lewis and Laurin Rinder from El Coco, and the Motown musicians, including Eddie "Bongo" Brown and Jack Ashford.

=== List of songs ===
1. "Going to a Go-Go"
2. "I Can't Help Myself (Sugar Pie Honey Bunch)"
3. "Uptight (Everything's Alright)"
4. "Stop! In the Name of Love"
5. "It's the Same Old Song"
6. "The Tears of a Clown"
7. "Love Is Like an Itching in My Heart"
8. "This Old Heart of Mine (Is Weak for You)"
9. "Baby Love"
10. "He Was Really Saying Somethin'"

== Chart performance ==
Chart (1977)	Peak Position
US Billboard Hot 100	25
US Billboard Hot Soul Singles	10
US Disco Action Top 40	2
Australia (Kent Music Report)	20
Belgium	16
Canada RPM Top 100 Singles	69
New Zealand	15
United Kingdom	30
