= The Look (album) =

Studio album by Shalamar
- Released: July 11, 1983
- Recorded: 1982–1983
- Genre: Boogie; dance-pop; soul
- Length: 46:26
- Label: SOLAR
- Producer: Leon Sylvers III

Shalamar chronology
| Friends (1982) | The Look (1983) | Heartbreak (1984) |

Professional ratings
Review scores
| Source | Rating |
|---|---|
| AllMusic | 3/5 stars |
| Robert Christgau | B+ |

The Look is the seventh album by American R&B group Shalamar, released in 1983 on the SOLAR label. It is the last Shalamar album to feature the classic line-up of Jeffrey Daniel, Howard Hewett and Jody Watley, as both Daniel and Watley would leave the group shortly before its release. The album features the Grammy nominated hit single "Dead Giveaway".

The Look peaked at No. 13 on the R&B chart and No. 79 on the Billboard pop chart. Like Shalamar's previous album, Friends, it was more successful in the United Kingdom, where it reached No. 7. The Look was certified Gold in the UK.

== Track listing ==
Side one
| No. | Title | Writer(s) | Length |
|---|---|---|---|
| 1. | "Closer" | Wilmer Raglin, William Zimmerman, Dana Meyers | 5:07 |
| 2. | "Dead Giveaway" | Joey Gallo, Leon Sylvers III, Marquis Dair | 5:01 |
| 3. | "You Can Count on Me" | Carrie Lucas, Ken Rarick | 3:47 |
| 4. | "Right Here" | Ricky Sylvers, Leon Sylvers III, Kevin Spencer, Vincent Brantley | 4:16 |
| 5. | "No Limits (The Now Club)" | Marquis Dair, Leon Sylvers III, Patricia Sylvers, Joey Gallo | 4:47 |

Side two
| No. | Title | Writer(s) | Length |
|---|---|---|---|
| 6. | "Disappearing Act" | Foster Sylvers, Dana Meyers, Janet Cole | 5:25 |
| 7. | "Over and Over" | Leon Sylvers III, William Shelby, Dominic Leslie | 4:34 |
| 8. | "You're the One for Me" | Isaias Gamboa, Howard Hewett, Leon Sylvers III | 5:00 |
| 9. | "You Won't Miss Love (Until It's Gone)" | Wardell Potts, Jr., Rickey Smith, Howard Hewett | 4:06 |
| 10. | "The Look" | Howard Hewett, Stanley Clarke | 3:55 |

== Charts ==
=== Weekly charts ===
| Chart (1983) | Peak position |
|---|---|
| Dutch Albums (Album Top 100) | 50 |
| UK Albums (OCC) | 7 |
| US Billboard 200 | 79 |
| US Top R&B/Hip-Hop Albums | 13 |

=== Year-end charts ===
| Chart (1983) | Position |
|---|---|
| UK Albums (OCC) | 49 |

== Certifications ==
| Region | Certification | Certified units/sales |
|---|---|---|
| United Kingdom (BPI) | Gold | 100,000^{^} |
^{^} Shipments figures based on certification alone.
