= Friends (Shalamar album) =

Studio album by Shalamar
- Released: January 29, 1982
- Recorded: 1981
- Studios: Studio Masters; Larrabee Sound; The Record Plant; Kendun Recorders (Los Angeles)
- Genres: R&B; funk; soul; disco
- Length: 44:55
- Label: SOLAR
- Producer: Leon Sylvers III

Shalamar chronology
Go for It (1981)	Friends (1982)	The Look (1983)

Friends is the sixth album by American R&B group Shalamar, released in 1982 on the SOLAR label. The album, which features the 'classic' Shalamar line-up (Jeffrey Daniel, Howard Hewett and Jody Watley), topped the R&B chart and peaked at No. 35 on the Billboard chart. It has been certified Gold in the United States for sales over 500,000. It would eventually go Platinum. In the United Kingdom Friends gained impetus from a demonstration of body-popping by Daniel during a performance of "A Night to Remember" on the BBC programme Top of the Pops. It reached No. 6 on the UK Albums Chart and produced four top 20 singles.

In 2002, Friends was re-released by Sanctuary Records in the United Kingdom in a double-CD package with Shalamar's previous album Go for It.

== Reception ==
Professional ratings
Review scores
Source	Rating
AllMusic	4.5/5 stars
BBC	favorable
Robert Christgau	B−

In The Boston Phoenix, Mike Freedberg wrote that the album "presents [Howard] Hewitt again and again overmatched by roseate fugues, overmatching lyrics so glib they vanish. He doesn't know whether to drive ahead or scat back--but neither would a Shalamar fan. Hewitt's stabs at sincerity fit into the I-can't-manage atmosphere that has all but replaced the buoyant bravado of soul, funk, and disco from today's black-teen music."

== Track listing ==
Side one
No.	Title	Writer(s)	Length
1.	"A Night to Remember"	Dana Meyers, Charmaine Sylvers, Nidra Beard	5:08
2.	"Don't Try to Change Me"	William Bryant, Tina Scott, Roberta Stiger	4:10
3.	"Help Me"	Joey Gallo, Leon Sylvers III, Jody Watley, Nidra Beard	5:10
4.	"On Top of the World"	Dana Meyers, Richard Randolph	4:06
5.	"I Don't Wanna Be the Last to Know"	Kevin Spencer, William Shelby, Linda Carriere, Nidra Beard	4:02

Side two
No.	Title	Writer(s)	Length
6.	"Friends"	William Shelby, Glen Barbee, Nidra Beard	5:00
7.	"Playing to Win"	Jody Watley, Ralph E. Clayborne, Charmaine Sylvers	4:24
8.	"I Just Stopped By Because I Had To"	Stephen Shockley, Joey Gallo, Leon Sylvers III, Nidra Beard	4:08
9.	"There It Is"	Nidra Beard, Dana Meyers, Charmaine Sylvers	4:27
10.	"I Can Make You Feel Good"	William Shelby, Howard Hewett, Renwick Jackson	4:20

== Personnel ==
Shalamar

- Jeffrey Daniel - lead & backing vocals
- Howard Hewett - lead & backing vocals
- Jody Watley - lead & backing vocals

Musical personnel

- Leon Sylvers III - bass, percussion, keyboards
- Wardell Potts, Jr. - drums
- Foster Sylvers - bass
- Joey Gallo - keyboards
- Kevin Spencer - keyboards
- James Ingram - bass, keyboards
- Ricky Sylvers - guitar
- Ed Green - drums
- Ernest "Pepper" Reed - guitar
- Richard Randolph - guitar
- Michael Nash - keyboards
- William Shelby - keyboards
- Wayne Milstein - percussion

== Charts ==
=== Weekly charts ===
Chart (1982)	Peak position
Dutch Albums (Album Top 100)	32
UK Albums (Official Charts)	6
US Billboard 200	35
US Top R&B/Hip-Hop Albums (Billboard)	1

=== Year-end charts ===
Chart (1982)	Position
Dutch Albums (Album Top 100)	96
UK Albums (OCC)	26
US Top R&B/Hip-Hop Albums (Billboard)	10

Chart (1983)	Position
UK Albums (OCC)	64

=== Singles ===
Year	Single	Chart positions			
Year	Single	UK Pop	US Pop	US R&B	US Dance
1982	"I Can Make You Feel Good"	7	102	33	-
1982	"A Night To Remember"	5	44	8	15
1982	"There It Is"	5	-	-	-
1982	"Friends"	12	-	-	-

== Certifications ==
Region	Certification	Certified units/sales
United Kingdom (BPI)	Platinum	300,000^{^}
United States (RIAA)	Gold	500,000^{^}
^{^} Shipments figures based on certification alone.

== See also ==
- List of number-one R&B albums of 1982 (U.S.)
