= Wake Up (Shalamar album) =

Studio album by Shalamar
- Released: August 24, 1990
- Recorded: 1989–1990
- Genres: R&B, new jack swing
- Length: 57:50
- Label: SOLAR

Shalamar chronology
Circumstantial Evidence (1987)	Wake Up (1990)

Singles from Wake Up
- 1. "Caution: This Love Is Hot!" Released: 1990; 2. "Wake Up" Released: 1990; 3. "Come Together" Released: 1991

Wake Up is the tenth and final album by the American R&B group Shalamar, released in 1990 on SOLAR. It is the second Shalamar album to include Delisa Davis, Micki Free and Sidney Justin.

In an attempt to keep Shalamar relevant to a contemporary market, the album was heavily influenced by the then-dominant new jack swing style. Wake Up failed to register on any chart in either the USA or the UK; neither did it produce a charting single in either country. It is Shalamar's least successful album.

== Critical reception ==
Professional ratings
Review scores
Source	Rating
AllMusic	2/5 stars
Chicago Tribune	2/4 stars
The Encyclopedia of Popular Music	2/5 stars
The Rolling Stone Album Guide	2/5 stars

The Chicago Tribune wrote that "the surprise entry is a lively reworking of the Beatles' tune 'Come Together'."

== Track listing ==
No.	Title	Writer(s)	Length
1.	"Caution: This Love Is Hot!"	R. Ray Barnes, Anthony T. Coleman	3:55
2.	"Wake Up"	Sidney Justin, Demetric Collins	6:43
3.	"Why Lead Me On"	Johnny Thomas Jr.	5:09
4.	"Groove Talk"	Belva Haney	4:21
5.	"All I Wanna Do"	Belva Haney	4:06
6.	"Come Together"	John Lennon, Paul McCartney	5:49
7.	"For Sure"	Sidney Justin, Eddie Miller	5:24
8.	"I'll Give U Love"	Sidney Justin, Redg Green, Eddie Miller	6:35
9.	"I Want U"	Delisa Davis, Tsuyoshi Takayanagi, Don Taylor	5:01
10.	"Pink Box"	Tania Carmenatti, Johnny Thomas Jr., John Baker, James Moore	4:11
