= Carolyn Griffey =

American soul/funk singer

- Origin: United States
- Genres: Soul; funk
- Occupation: Singer
- Years active: 1990–present
- Label: SOLAR Records
- Member of: Shalamar

Carolyn Griffey is an American soul vocalist and member of the soul funk group Shalamar. She is the daughter of Carrie Lucas and SOLAR Records–founder Dick Griffey, who worked with Don Cornelius on the television program Soul Train.

Griffey grew up around The Whispers, Shalamar, Midnight Star, Dynasty, Michael Jackson, Marvin Gaye and James Brown, who all appeared on Soul Train or who were signed to SOLAR Records.

In 1990, she was signed to SOLAR Records as part of the dance-pop duo called Absolute. This group released one album, For All Seasons, in 1990. Their singles included "Cheap Shot", "Gotta Lambada" and "This Moment In Time" (both from the film soundtrack of Lambada).

She has been the lead female vocalist of Shalamar since 2001. She appeared on ITV's Hit Me, Baby, One More Time in 2005 and has toured the world with Howard Hewett and Jeffrey Daniel.

She also sings with Andraé Crouch and his gospel choir, who are known for their work on Michael Jackson's "Man in the Mirror".

In October 2009, Griffey performed with Hewett and Daniels in Shalamar at London's O2 Arena. This prompted a return to touring in the UK, in April 2010. They were an annual feature at London's O2 Arena every December since 2010. In 2014, Griffey appeared with Howard Hewett and Jeffrey Daniels for two Shalamar concerts at the Manchester Ritz and London O2.

In 2018, Carolyn Griffey, Carrie Lucas, Lucas Griffey, and the Chinese-music-promoter Jessie Tsang relaunched Solar Records and Soul Train Records in the UK. The relaunch was covered in the UK magazine Soul Survivors. Jessie Tsang is CEO with Sonia Damney as Vice President. Carolyn Griffey along with Carrie Lucas also own trademark rights to Shalamar in the UK and Europe. In 2022, Griffey and Carrie Lucas participated with the U.S. cable channel TV One for a special episode of the Unsung TV series covering Dick Griffey and Solar Records. The episode aired on November 6, 2022.
