= Music Walk of Fame =

Tourist attraction in Camden, England

The Music Walk Of Fame is a tourist attraction on Camden High Street, Camden, London founded in 2019.

Plaques have been laid for UB40, and Janis Joplin. In total 11 plaques are intended for the September 2023 unveilings with stones for Harvey Goldsmith, Gordon Mac, Paul ‘Trouble’ Anderson, The Sugarhill Gang, Eddy Grant, Buzzcocks, Billy Bragg, Shalamar and The Kinks.

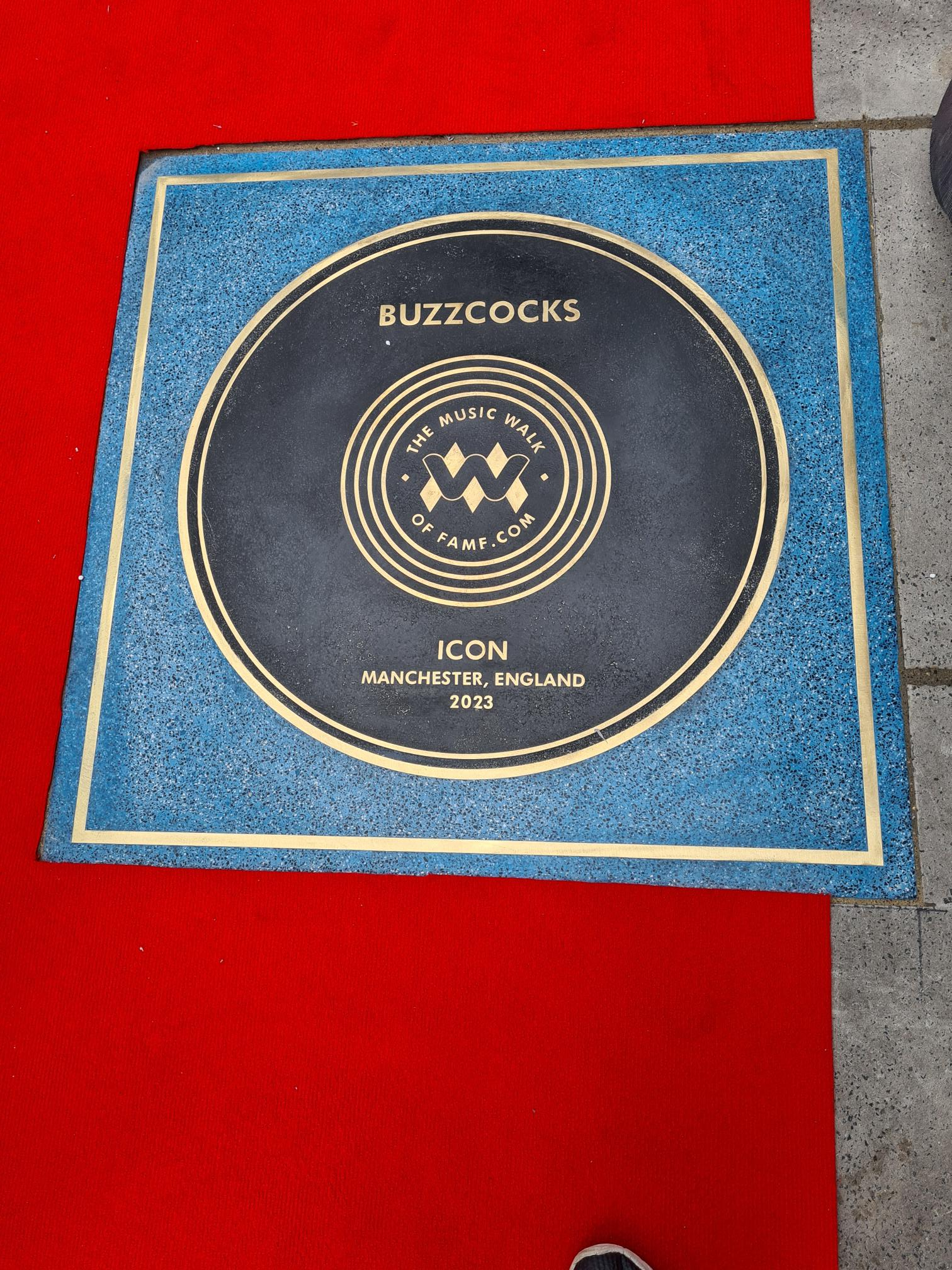
The plaque of 'Buzzcocks' at the Music Walk of Fame

== Manufacturing ==
The plaques for the Music Walk of Fame are produced by Blyko. Blyko is a UK-based manufacturer specializing in bespoke paving and concrete products. Each stone is handcrafted to meet the unique design specifications of the Music Walk of Fame.
