= This Is for the Lover in You =

1981 single by Shalamar

- US 7-inch single of the Shalamar recording

Single by Shalamar

from the album Three for Love
- B-side: "Some Things Never Change"
- Released: May 25, 1981
- Recorded: 1980
- Length: 5:04 (album version); 3:58 (single edit)
- Label: SOLAR
- Songwriters: Howard Hewett; Dana Meyers
- Producer: Leon Sylvers III

Shalamar singles chronology
| "Make That Move" (1981) | "This Is for the Lover in You" (1981) | "Sweeter as the Days Go By" (1981) |

"This Is for the Lover in You" is a song written by Howard Hewett, member of American R&B and soul music vocal group Shalamar, and songwriter Dana Meyers. The track appeared on Shalamar's 1980 Gold album, Three for Love. The song was the third single released from the album and peaked at No. 17 on the US Billboard R&B chart in 1981. In 2009, Essence magazine included the song in their list of the "25 Best Slow Jams of All Time".

The song's main melody bears resemblance to Teddy Pendergrass' hit "Close the Door" (1978) and Michael Jackson's hit "Rock with You" (1979).

== Charts ==
| Chart (1981) | Peak position |
|---|---|
| US Hot Soul Singles (Billboard) | 17 |

== Babyface version ==
"This Is for the Lover in You"
- US CD variant of standard artwork

Single by Babyface featuring LL Cool J, Howard Hewett, Jody Watley, and Jeffrey Daniel

from the album The Day
- Released: October 5, 1996
- Recorded: 1996
- Genre: R&B; hip hop
- Length: 5:26
- Label: Epic
- Songwriters: Howard Hewett; Dana Meyers
- Producers: Babyface; Samuel J. Barnes; Jean-Claude Olivier; James Todd Smith; Bryce Wilson

Babyface singles chronology
| "Slow Jams" (1996) | "This Is for the Lover in You" (1996) | "Talk to Me" (1996) |

LL Cool J singles chronology
| "Loungin'" (1996) | "This is for the Lover in You" (1996) | "Hit 'Em High (The Monstars' Anthem)" (1997) |

Jody Watley singles chronology
| "Affection" (1995) | "This is for the Lover in You" (1996) | "Off the Hook" (1998) |

Music video
- "This is for the Lover in You" on YouTube

"This Is for the Lover in You" was later remade by American singer, songwriter, and record producer Babyface for his fourth studio album, The Day (1996). It features LL Cool J and the former members of Shalamar: Howard Hewett, Jody Watley, and Jeffrey Daniel. The Babyface version was a successful hit, reaching #6 on the US Hot 100 chart, #2 on the US R&B chart, and #12 on the UK Singles Chart. The song was considered to be atypical for Babyface when it was released. The song's main melody bears resemblance to Teddy Pendergrass' hit "Close the Door".

=== Critical reception ===
Larry Flick from Billboard magazine described Babyface's version as "a smoldering, jeep-fashioned revision" of a Shalamar chestnut that reunites the original members of that act on background vocals. He added, "It's a nice touch, though nothing diverts the ear from Babyface's suave and soulful vocals for longer than a second or two. Added juice is provided by LL Cool J, who freestyles in the background with macho flair—a vibrant contrast to Babyface's performance. No need to speculate on this single's success. Just get used to hearing it on the radio nonstop for the next couple of months."

=== Charts and certifications ===
==== Weekly charts ====
| Chart (1996) | Peak position |
|---|---|
| Australia (ARIA) | 50 |
| Canada (Nielsen SoundScan) | 14 |
| Europe (European Dance Radio) | 8 |
| Israel (Israeli Singles Chart) | 22 |
| Netherlands (Dutch Top 40) | 23 |
| Netherlands (Single Top 100) | 19 |
| New Zealand (Recorded Music NZ) | 12 |
| Sweden (Sverigetopplistan) | 34 |
| UK Singles (Official Charts) | 12 |
| US Billboard Hot 100 | 6 |
| US Hot R&B/Hip-Hop Songs (Billboard) | 2 |
| US Rhythmic Airplay (Billboard) | 6 |
| US Cash Box Top 100 | 7 |

==== Year-end charts ====
| Chart (1996) | Position |
|---|---|
| US Hot R&B/Hip-Hop Songs (Billboard) | 74 |

| Chart (1997) | Position |
|---|---|
| US Hot R&B/Hip-Hop Songs (Billboard) | 61 |

==== Certifications ====
| Region | Certification | Certified units/sales |
|---|---|---|
| United States (RIAA) | Platinum | 1,000,000^{^} |
^{^} Shipments figures based on certification alone.

== Other versions ==
In 1994, saxophonist Gerald Albright released a rendition from the album Smooth.

The song was also sampled by British singer Ella Mai for her 2022 single This Is.

The song was sampled by rapper A+ for his song "All I See", recorded for his 1996 debut album The Latch-Key Child.
