= There It Is (Shalamar song) =

Single by Shalamar

from the album Friends
- B-side: I Don't Wanna Be the Last to Know
- Released: 1982
- Genre: R&B
- Label: SOLAR Records
- Songwriter(s): Nidra Beard, Dana Meyers, Charmaine Sylvers
- Producer(s): Leon Sylvers III

Shalamar singles chronology
"A Night to Remember" (1982)	"There It Is" (1982)	"Friends" (1982)

"There It Is" is a 1982 song by the American R&B and soul group Shalamar from their sixth studio album Friends. It is their highest charting single on the UK Singles Chart, along with "A Night to Remember", which both reached number 5. In Ireland, the song reached number 6. It was ranked at number 9 among the top ten "Tracks of the Year" for 1982 by NME.

== Track listings ==
=== 7" single ===
No.	Title	Length
1.	"There It Is"	4:27
2.	"I Don't Wanna Be the Last to Know"	4:02

=== 12" single ===
No.	Title	Length
1.	"There It Is (Extended Version)"
2.	"I Don't Wanna Be the Last to Know"

== Charts ==
=== Weekly charts ===
Chart (1982)	Peak position
Ireland (IRMA)	6
UK Singles (OCC)	5

=== Year-end charts ===
Chart (1982)	Position
UK Singles (OCC)	58

== Certifications ==
Region	Certification	Certified units/sales
United Kingdom (BPI)	Silver	250,000^{^}
^{^} Shipments figures based on certification alone.
