= Alton McClain and Destiny =

American disco girl group

- Also known as: Krystol
- Origin: Los Angeles, California, USA
- Genres: Disco, R&B
- Instrument: vocals
- Years active: 1978–1981 (Alton McClain and Destiny); 1982–1989 (Krystol)
- Labels: Polydor, Epic
- Past members: Alton McClain and Destiny: Alton McClain; D'Marie Warren; Robyrda Stiger; Krystol: D'Marie Warren; Robyrda Stiger; Tina Scott; Karon Floyd; Robbie Faith Danzie

Alton McClain and Destiny was an American disco girl group from Los Angeles, California. Formed in 1978, the trio was composed of McClain, Delores Marie "D'Marie" Warren, and Robyrda Stiger. They signed to Polydor Records in the year of their formation and Frank Wilson produced their debut set. It was released as a self-titled album early in 1979 but then was repackaged under the title It Must Be Love several months later. The title track was released as a single and charted, but the second album did not sell well. The group was dropped less than a year after its release and they split in 1981.

McClain later married producer Skip Scarborough and continued working in the music industry. Alton McClain continued recording as a gospel singer, releasing albums God's Woman in 1995 and Renaissance in 2005. Robyrda Stiger and D'Marie Warren signed with Epic Records as a part of the girl group Krystol. The group also included singer-songwriters Tina Scott, and Karon Floyd- who would later be replaced by Robbie Danzie, due to Floyd going on maternity leave by the release of their second album Talk of the Town.

Krystol's first two albums were produced by former SOLAR Records in-house producer Leon Sylvers III. D. Marie Warren died in a car crash on February 22, 1985, at age 33, before Talk of the Town was released.

In 2012, the first two albums by Krystol- Gettin' Ready and Talk of the Town were reissued by Sony Music Entertainment reissue label Funkytown Grooves. The third album, Passion from a Woman was reissued in June 2013.

== Discography ==
=== Albums ===
As Alton McClain and Destiny

Year	Album	Label	Peak chart positions	
Year	Album	Label	US	US R&B
1978	Alton McClain & Destiny	Polydor	—	—
1979	It Must Be Love (re-release of debut)	Polydor	88	27
1979	More of You	Polydor	—	—
1981	Gonna Tell the World	Polydor	—	—
"—" denotes releases that did not chart or were not released in that territory.

As Krystol

Year	Album	Label	
Year	Album	Label	US R&B
1984	Gettin' Ready	Epic Records	—
1985	Talk of the Town	Epic Records	—
1986	Passion from a Woman	Epic Records	55
1989	I Suggest U Don't Let Go	Epic Records	—
"—" denotes releases that did not chart or were not released.

=== Singles ===
As Alton McClain and Destiny

Year	Single	Peak chart positions		
Year	Single	US Dance	US R&B	US Pop
1979	"Crazy Love"	—	69	―
1979	"My Empty Room"	—	—	―
1979	"It Must Be Love"	25	10	32
1979	"Sweet Temptation"	―	―	―
1980	"Thank Heaven for You"	―	―	―
1980	"You Bring to Me My Morning Light"	—	—	―
1980	"Love Waves"	47	―	―
1980	"I Don't Want to Be with Nobody Else"	—	76	―
1981	"My Destiny"	93	81	―
"—" denotes releases that did not chart or were not released in that territory.

As Krystol

Year	Single	Peak chart positions	
Year	Single	US Dance	US R&B
1984	"After the Dance Is Through"	40	―
1984	"Information"	—	—
1984	"Nobody's Gonna Get This Lovin' but You"	—	87
1984	"Same Place, Same Time"	—	—
1984	"You're the One for Me"	—	—
1984	"You Ask Too Much"	—	—
1985	"Talk of the Town"	—	—
1985	"Love Is Like an Itching in My Heart"	—	86
1985	"The Things That Men Do"	—	90
1985	"Shattered Glass"	—	—
1986	"Precious, Precious"	—	25
1986	"Passion from a Woman"	—	18
1986	"I Might Fall in Love with You"	—	—
1988	"Don't Let Go"	—	—
"—" denotes releases that did not chart or were not released in that territory.
