= The Sylvers (album) =

Studio album by the Sylvers
- Released: February 17, 1972
- Recorded: 1971
- Genres: Soul, funk
- Length: 40:32
- Labels: Pride, MGM
- Producers: Jerry Butler, Keg Johnson

The Sylvers chronology
The Sylvers (1972)	The Sylvers II (1973)

Professional ratings
Review scores
Source	Rating
AllMusic	3/5 stars

The Sylvers is the debut album by the Los Angeles, California-based R&B group the Sylvers. The album was released on MGM Records subsidiary Pride Records, a label founded by record and film producer Michael Viner. Released in 1972, it was produced by R&B legends Jerry Butler (of the Impressions) and Keg Johnson.

This album released three singles: "Fool's Paradise", "Wish I Could Talk to You" and "I'll Never Be Ashamed".

In 2013, Dusty Groove Records reissued their debut on vinyl.

== Track listing ==
- All songs written by Leon Sylvers III, except where noted
1. "Wish That I Could Talk to You" (2:53)
2. "Fool's Paradise" (2:28)
3. "Only One Can Win" (3:00)
4. "I'm Truly Happy" – (Jerry Peters) (2:48)
5. "Touch Me Jesus" – (Brian Holland, Lamont Dozier, A. Bond) (3:25)
6. "I Know Myself" (3:32)
7. "Chaos" (3:12)
8. "So Close" (2:52)
9. "I'll Never Be Ashamed" – (James Sylvers) (3:13)
10. "How Love Hurts" (4:16)

== Personnel ==
- Jerry Butler - producer
- Keg Johnson - producer
- Michael Viner - executive producer
- David Crawford - arranger
- Jerry Peters - arranger
