= Big Fun (Shalamar album) =

Studio album by Shalamar
- Released: August 30, 1979
- Recorded: 1979
- Studio: Studio Masters (Los Angeles); Jack Clement (Nashville)
- Genre: Pop; disco; R&B
- Length: 37:07
- Label: SOLAR
- Producer: Leon Sylvers III

Shalamar chronology
Disco Gardens (1978)	Big Fun (1979)	Three for Love (1980)

Big Fun is the third album by the American musical group Shalamar, released in 1979 through SOLAR Records. Big Fun was produced by Leon Sylvers III and is the first album to feature what is considered the 'classic' Shalamar line-up (Jeffrey Daniel, Howard Hewett and Jody Watley), with Hewett having replaced Gerald Brown. The album features the group's most successful hit on the Hot 100 pop chart, "The Second Time Around".

Big Fun has been certified Gold in the United States for sales of over 500,000. It peaked at No. 4 on the R&B chart and No. 23 on the Billboard chart (Shalamar's highest-placing album on this chart). In the UK it reached No. 45.

In 2002, Big Fun was re-released by Sanctuary Records in the United Kingdom in a two-for-one CD format with Shalamar's following album Three for Love.

The song "I Owe You One" was sampled in Raw Man's "Beautiful", and Le Knight Club's "Mosquito".

== Reception ==
Professional ratings
Review scores
Source	Rating
The Rolling Stone Album Guide	3/5 stars

The New York Times called the album "a very eclectic blend of pop hooks and light disco with funk trimmings." AllMusic rated the album four out of five stars. Writer Colin Larkin rated it three out of five.

The album sold 625,000+ units as of July 1982. Its single "The Second Time Around" sold around 1.8 million units.

== Track listing ==
Side one
No.	Title	Writer(s)	Length
1.	"The Right Time for Us"	Leon Sylvers III, Dick Griffey	5:53
2.	"Take Me to the River"	Renaldo Benson, Lawrence Payton	4:57
3.	"Right in the Socket"	Kevin Spencer, Leon Sylvers III, Dick Griffey	6:51

Side two
No.	Title	Writer(s)	Length
4.	"The Second Time Around"	Leon Sylvers III, William Shelby	7:05
5.	"I Owe You One"	Joey Gallo, Leon Sylvers III	5:11
6.	"Let's Find the Time for Love"	Kevin Spencer, Leon Sylvers III	4:36
7.	"Girl"	Kossi Gardner	5:24

== Personnel ==
Shalamar

- Jody Watley, Jeffrey Daniel, Howard Hewett: lead and backing vocals

Musical personnel

- Kevin Spencer: keyboards, clavinet
- William Shelby: keyboards, clavinet, Fender Rhodes
- Kossi Gardner: keyboards, Fender Rhodes, Hammond organ
- "Gip" Nobels, Gene Dozier, Joey Gallo, John Barnes, Ron Artists: keyboards
- Ernest Biles, James Davis: bass
- Leon Sylvers III: bass, percussion
- Ernest Reed, Fred Rheimert, Steve Shockley: guitars
- Freeman Brown, Gerald Thompson, Wardell Potts: drums
- Greg "Popeye" Dawkins: congas
- Fred Lewis: percussion
- Christine Ermacoff, Edgar Lustgarten, Harry Shlutz, Marie Fera: cellos
- Brian Leanord, David Johnson, Jerry Vinci, Ilkka Talvi, Irma Newman, Norman Carr, Norman Leonard, Reginald Hill, Ronald Fulsom, Sheldon Sanou: violins

== Charts ==
=== Weekly charts ===
Chart (1979–1980)	Peak position
US Billboard 200	23
US Top R&B/Hip-Hop Albums (Billboard)	4

=== Year-end charts ===
Chart (1980)	Position
US Billboard 200	56
US Top R&B/Hip-Hop Albums (Billboard)	6

=== Single ===
Year	Single	Chart	Position
1979	I Owe You One	Hot Soul Singles	60
1980	The Second Time Around	Billboard Hot 100	8
1980	The Second Time Around	Hot Soul Singles	1
1980	Right in the Socket	Hot Soul Singles	22
