= Disco Gardens =

Studio album by Shalamar
- Released: August 28, 1978
- Recorded: 1977–1978
- Studio: Studio Masters, Los Angeles, California, Star Track, Los Angeles, California
- Genre: Disco, R&B
- Length: 31:52
- Label: SOLAR
- Producer: Leon Sylvers III, Dick Griffey

Shalamar chronology
Uptown Festival (1977)	Disco Gardens (1978)	Big Fun (1979)

Professional ratings
Review scores
Source	Rating
AllMusic	3/5 stars
The Encyclopedia of Popular Music	2/5 stars
Pitchfork	7.0/10
The Rolling Stone Album Guide	2.5/5 stars

Disco Gardens is the second album by the American R&B group Shalamar, released in 1978 on SOLAR Records. The group included Gerald Brown, Jeffrey Daniel and Jody Watley; it was the only Shalamar album on which Brown appeared.

Disco Gardens was less successful than Shalamar's debut, Uptown Festival, peaking at No. 171 on the Billboard 200. It also peaked at No. 52 on the R&B chart. "Take That to the Bank" was a UK top 20 hit.

== Track listing ==
Side one
No.	Title	Writer(s)	Length
1.	"Tossing, Turning and Swinging"	Ricky Sylvers, Edmund Sylvers, James Sylvers, Leon Sylvers III	5:47
2.	"Shalamar Disco Gardens"	Jeffrey Daniel	3:44
3.	"Take That to the Bank"	Kevin Spencer, Leon Sylvers III	6:14

Side two
No.	Title	Writer(s)	Length
1.	"Stay Close to Love"	Leon Sylvers III, Herman Brown	3:49
2.	"Leave It All Up to Love"	Wayne Bell, Merlin Bell, Malcolm Anthony	3:46
3.	"Lovely Lady"	Kossi Gardner	5:36
4.	"Cindy, Cindy"	Wayne Bell, Merlin Bell, Malcolm Anthony	2:56

== Singles ==
"Take That to the Bank" (US Hot 100 No. 79, US R&B No. 11, UK No. 20)
