= Three for Love =

Studio album by Shalamar
- Released: December 15, 1980
- Recorded: 1978–1980
- Studio: Studio Masters; Larrabee Sound (Los Angeles); Aura Sound (Orlando, Florida)
- Genre: R&B, post-disco
- Length: 40:41
- Label: SOLAR
- Producer: Leon Sylvers III

Shalamar chronology
Big Fun (1979)	Three for Love (1980)	Go for It (1981)

Three for Love is the fourth album by American R&B group Shalamar, released in 1980 on the SOLAR label. It was produced by Leon Sylvers III and features the 'classic' Shalamar line-up (Jeffrey Daniel, Howard Hewett and Jody Watley).

Three for Love has been certified Gold in the United States for sales of over 500,000. The album eventually went Platinum. It peaked at #8 on the R&B chart and #40 on the Billboard chart.

In 2002, Three for Love was re-released by Sanctuary Records in the United Kingdom in a two-for-one CD format with Shalamar's previous album Big Fun.

== Reception ==
AllMusic rated the album four and a half out of five stars. Music critic Robert Christgau graded it "A−". Writer Colin Larkin rated it three out of five.

The album had sold over 875,000 copies by July 1982. The single "Make That Move" sold more than 535,000 units.

The album was ranked 43 on "The 80 Greatest Albums of 1980" by Rolling Stone.

== Track listing ==
Side one
No.	Title	Writer(s)	Length
1.	"Full of Fire"	Jody Watley, Joey Gallo, Richard Randolph	6:20
2.	"Attention to My Baby"	William Shelby, Kevin Spencer, Wardell Potts	4:32
3.	"Somewhere There's a Love"	Otis Stokes, William Shelby, Ernest "Pepper" Reed	4:23
4.	"Some Things Never Change"	William Shelby, Dana Meyers	4:55

Side two
No.	Title	Writer(s)	Length
5.	"Make That Move"	Kevin Spencer, William Shelby, Ricky Smith	6:15
6.	"This Is for the Lover in You"	Howard Hewett, Dana Meyers	5:04
7.	"Work It Out"	Jody Watley, Nidra Beard	4:24
8.	"Pop Along Kid"	Jeffrey Daniel, Howard Hewett, Nidra Beard	4:48

== Personnel ==
=== Shalamar ===
- Jeffrey Daniel - baritone lead & backing vocals
- Howard Hewett - tenor lead & backing vocals
- Jody Watley - alto lead & backing vocals

=== Musical personnel ===
- Leon Sylvers III - bass, percussion
- Foster Sylvers - bass
- Wardell Potts, Jr. - drums
- Stephen Shockley - guitar
- Richard Randolph - guitar
- Ernest "Pepper" Reed - guitar
- Ricky Sylvers - guitar
- Fred Alexander, Jr. - percussion
- Kevin Spencer - keyboards
- Joey Gallo - keyboards
- James Sylvers - keyboards
- Michael Nash - keyboards
- Ricky Smith - keyboards

== Charts ==
=== Weekly charts ===
Chart (1980–1981)	Peak position
US Billboard 200	40
US Top R&B/Hip-Hop Albums (Billboard)	8

=== Year-end charts ===
Chart (1981)	Position
US Billboard 200	44
US Top R&B/Hip-Hop Albums (Billboard)	6

=== Single ===
Year	Single	Chart	Position
1981	"Full of Fire"	Billboard Hot 100	55
1981	"Full of Fire"	Hot Soul Singles	24
1981	"Make That Move"	Billboard Hot 100	60
1981	"Make That Move"	Hot Soul Singles	6
1981	"This Is for the Lover in You"	Hot Soul Singles	17
