= Jeffrey Daniel =

American dancer and singer-songwriter (born 1955)

- Born: Jeffrey Glen Daniel; August 24, 1955 (age 71); Los Angeles, California
- Origin: Los Angeles, California, U.S.
- Genres: R&B; pop
- Occupations: Singer; songwriter; dancer; choreographer
- Instruments: Vocals; guitar
- Years active: 1974–present
- Label: SOLAR
- Website: jeffreydaniel.com

Jeffrey Glen Daniel (born August 24, 1955) is an American dancer, singer, songwriter, and choreographer, and a founding member of the R&B vocal group Shalamar. In Nigeria, he is best known as a judge on the first three seasons of Nigerian Idol.

== Career ==
Daniel was born in Los Angeles. During his career he has taught, worked and ranked alongside musicians and dancers such as Shabba Doo, Popin' Pete and the Electric Boogaloos.

Daniel first performed "the backslide", a physically complicated dance technique (originally performed by the dance group the Lockers), now known as the "moonwalk", on British television during a performance of Shalamar's "A Night to Remember" on Top of the Pops. The song was a hit in 1982, almost a year before Michael Jackson moonwalked on the Motown 25: Yesterday, Today, Forever television broadcast; he was a fan of Soul Train – on which Jeffrey Daniel had been a back-up dancer. According to Jackson's sister La Toya, Jackson was a fan of Daniel's dancing and sought him out. He soon met, hired and learned from Daniel.

Daniel gives credit to a man that inspired him, the original dance "locker" Don Campbell, one of the earliest Soul Train dancers. He also gives praise to Cleveland Moses Jr. his partner on Soul Train and to Tyrone Proctor who was the premier "waack" dancer who taught Daniel the style of dance known as "waacking". It was on Soul Train whilst doing a routine dressed in black that Daniel and Geron 'Caszper' Candidate and Derek 'Cooley' Jackson/Jaxson first performed the moonwalk on U.S. television.

=== Shalamar ===
Daniel and his Soul Train dance partner Jody Watley, along with Howard Hewett, became the soul funk group Shalamar who had hit songs such as "A Night to Remember", "The Second Time Around", "I Can Make You Feel Good", "Friends", "Make that Move", "Take That to the Bank", "There It Is" and "I Owe You One". During the 1980s, Daniel was often seen in the London club scene with the likes of Bananarama, Wham! and Culture Club.

In 1983, after six years as a group, Shalamar performed at London's Wembley Arena and went their separate ways. Soon after, Daniel took on the role of 'Electra' in Andrew Lloyd Webber's new West End musical Starlight Express which involved wild costumes with complex choreography on roller skates. Also in 1984, Daniel appeared in the Paul McCartney film Give My Regards to Broad Street displaying his signature robotic or marionette-like dancing style (with McCartney, his wife Linda McCartney and members of the band Toto made up as marionettes) to the Wings hit, "Silly Love Songs".

First broadcast on the UK's Channel 4 on April 12, 1985, Daniel hosted 620 Soul Train, a British version of Soul Train which he produced with Don Cornelius. The groundbreaking show (for the UK) ran for 10 episodes and featured invited studio dancers with live studio guest artists, along with clips from the US version and the occasional music video and guest DJs such as Pete Tong and Tony Blackburn. It was highly regarded as essential viewing for soul and dance music fans because otherwise there was very little outlet for the music on the other pop/rock orientated UK TV stations at the time. The show was also one of the first TV research jobs for UK media broadcaster and interviewer Jonathan Ross before his own show started on Channel 4 in 1987.

=== Work with Michael Jackson ===
By 1987, Daniel was working with Michael Jackson who had always been a fan of Daniel's dance style since watching him on Soul Train in the 1970s. Daniel was hired as co-choreographer on the "Bad" and "Smooth Criminal" videos with primary choreographer Vincent Paterson in which he also starred. Daniel was later employed as a creative and choreography consultant on his world tours and the video Ghosts. Daniel subsequently became a consultant at the MJJ Productions record label to whom Brownstone, 3T and Men of Vizion were signed.

=== Recent years ===
He continues to perform, choreograph, produce and compose with various artists. He has worked with Babyface, LL Cool J, Paul McCartney, Sheena Easton, the Go-Go's and Vanessa Williams. He joined Nigerian Idol as a judge in 2010 for three seasons and has been performing live shows with a reformed Shalamar since 2002. The current Shalamar lineup is Daniel, Howard Hewett and Carolyn Griffey. They continue performing as a group and toured in 2017 across the UK.

== Personal life ==
Former Shalamar bandmate and dance partner Jody Watley stated in 2010 that she and Daniel had a tumultuous relationship that included emotional and physical abuse.

On June 13, 1980, Daniel married American R&B singer Stephanie Mills, but they divorced later in 1983.

== Discography ==
Albums

- Skinny Boy (1990)

Singles

- "AC/DC" (1984) UK #78
- "She's the Girl" (1990)
- "Make Love Great Again" (2020)
