= Shalamar =

American vocal group

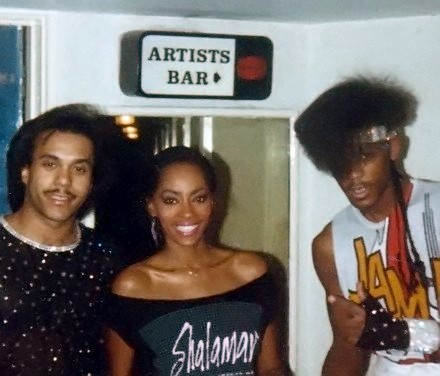
- Shalamar in 1983 (left to right: Howard Hewett, Jody Watley and Jeffrey Daniel)

Background information
- Origin: Los Angeles, California, U.S.
- Genres: Disco; funk; soul; post-disco; boogie
- Years active: 1977–1991, 1996–1997, 1999-present
- Labels: Soul Train; SOLAR
- Members: Howard Hewett; Jeffrey Daniel; Carolyn Griffey
- Past members: Jody Watley; Gary Mumford; Gerald Brown; Delisa Davis; Micki Free; Sidney Justin
- Website: shalamar.info

Shalamar (/ˈʃɑːləmɑːr/, /ˈʃæ-/) is an American R&B and soul music vocal group created by Dick Griffey and Don Cornelius in 1977 and active throughout the 1980s. Shalamar's classic lineup on the SOLAR label consisted of Howard Hewett, Jody Watley, and Jeffrey Daniel. It was originally a disco-driven group created by Soul Train booking agent Dick Griffey and show creator and producer Don Cornelius.

Initially signed to Soul Train Records, they transferred to Griffey's Solar Records after the Cornelius-Griffey Entertainment company was dissolved. According to British Hit Singles & Albums, they were fashion icons and trendsetters, and helped to introduce body-popping to the United Kingdom.

== Career ==
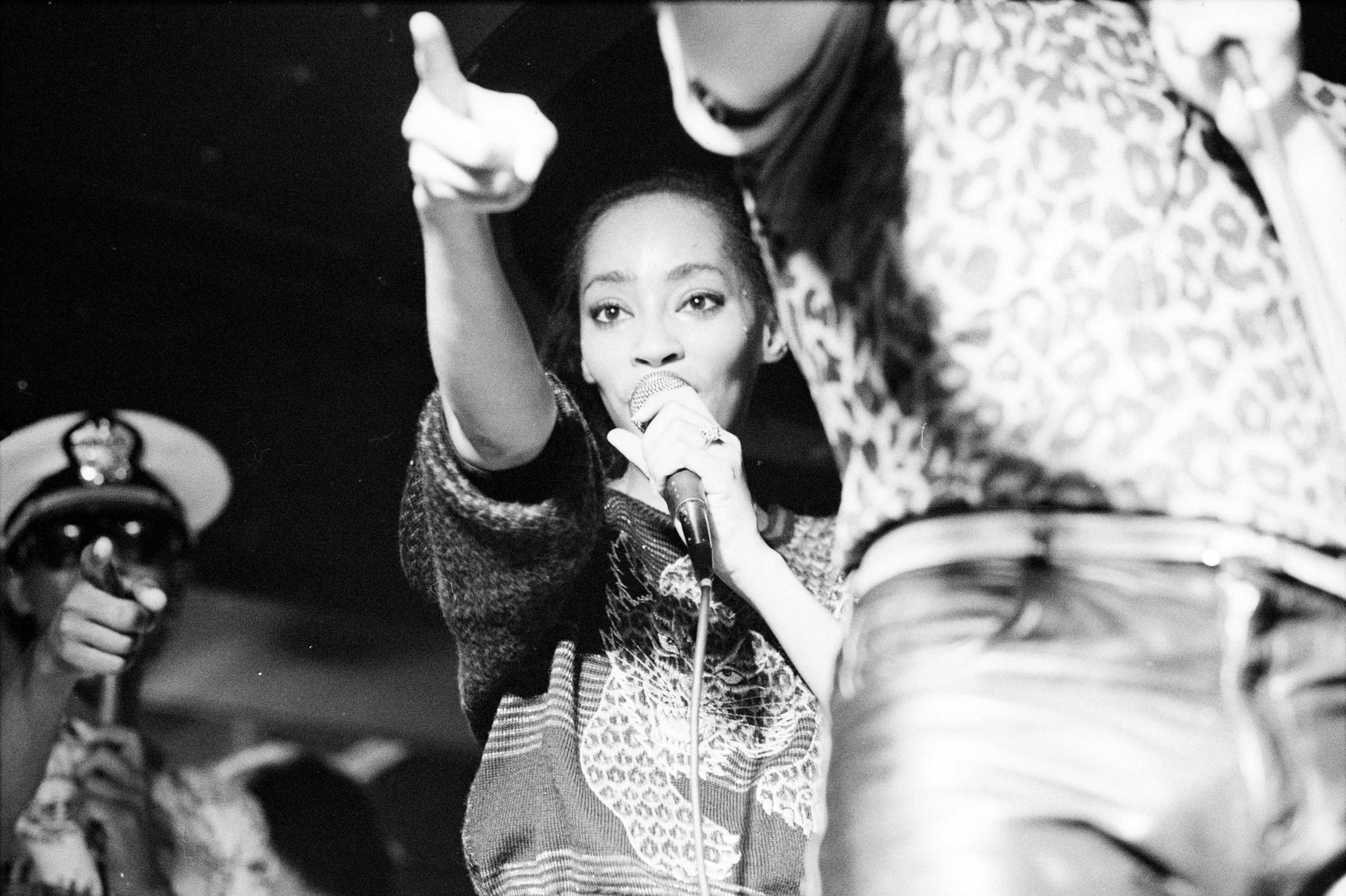
Shalamar in 1982

The first hit credited to Shalamar was "Uptown Festival" (1977), which was recorded at Ike & Tina Turner's studio Bolic Sound in 1976. It was released on Soul Train Records. Its success inspired Griffey and Don Cornelius to replace session singers with popular Soul Train dancers Jody Watley and Jeffrey Daniel, to join original Shalamar lead singer Gary Mumford. Gerald Brown took over the spot vacated by Mumford for the group's second album, Disco Gardens (1978), which featured the hit "Take That to the Bank". After conflicts over lack of payment from Griffey and SOLAR (short for Sound of Los Angeles Records), Brown left the group. Howard Hewett replaced Brown in 1979. The group was joined up with producer Leon Sylvers III in 1979, signed with SOLAR, and scored a US million seller with "The Second Time Around" (1979). The "classic" lineup of Hewett, Watley and Daniel would be the most successful.

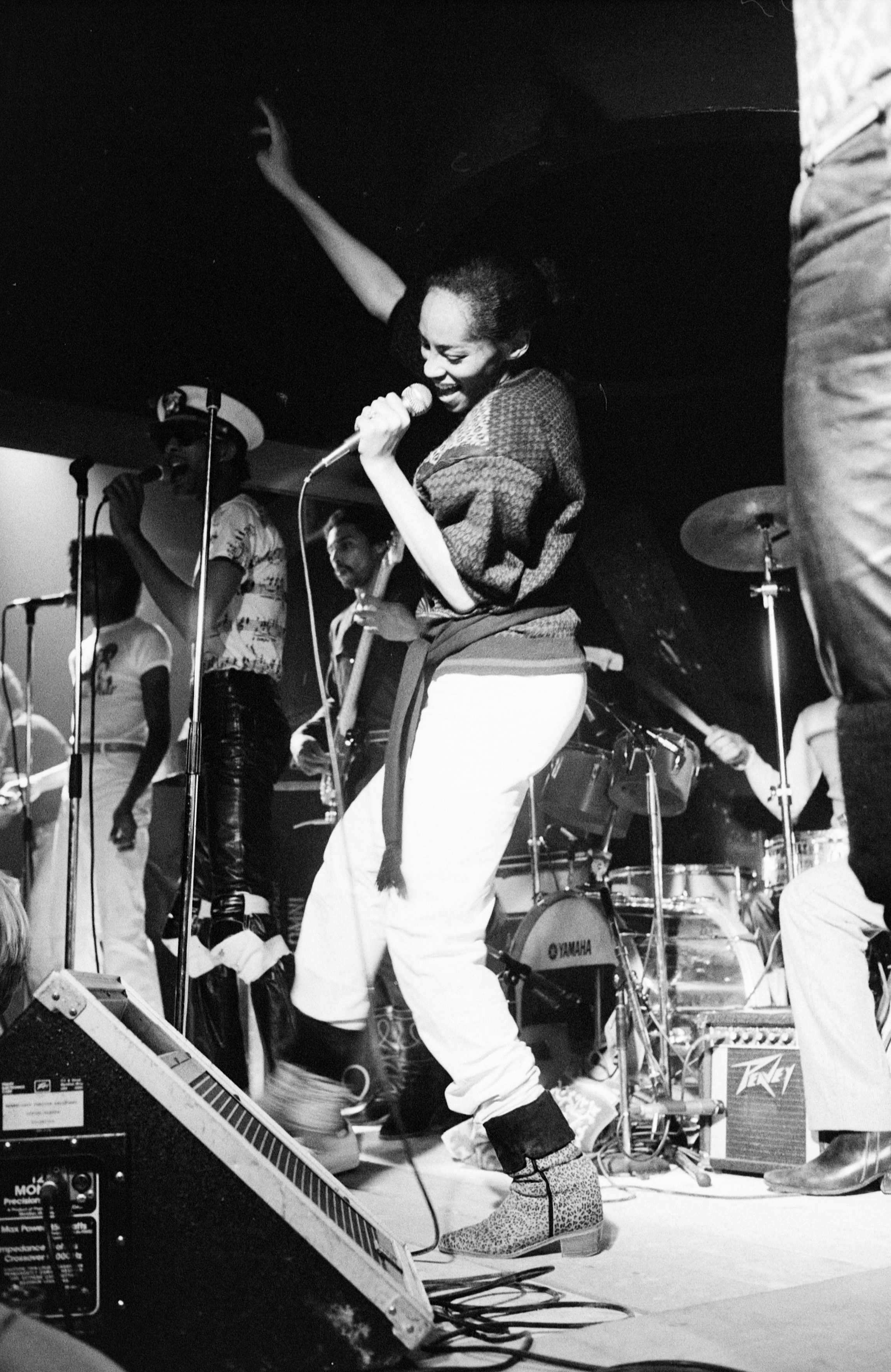
Shalamar in 1982

In the UK, the group had a string of hits with songs such as "Take That to the Bank" (1978), "I Owe You One" (1980), and songs from the Platinum-certified Friends (1982) album: "I Can Make You Feel Good" (1982), "A Night to Remember", the BPI Silver-certified "There It Is", and the title track "Friends". The album, which crossed the genres of pop, disco, and soul, was also a big seller in the UK in 1982. The band's record sales in the UK increased when Daniel demonstrated his body-popping dancing skills on BBC Television's music programme, Top of the Pops, which had premiered the moonwalk on television for the first time. Michael Jackson was a fan of Shalamar, particularly Daniel and his dance moves, after watching him on Soul Train. Daniel and Jackson co-choreographed Jackson's "Bad" and "Smooth Criminal" videos from the album Bad (1987).

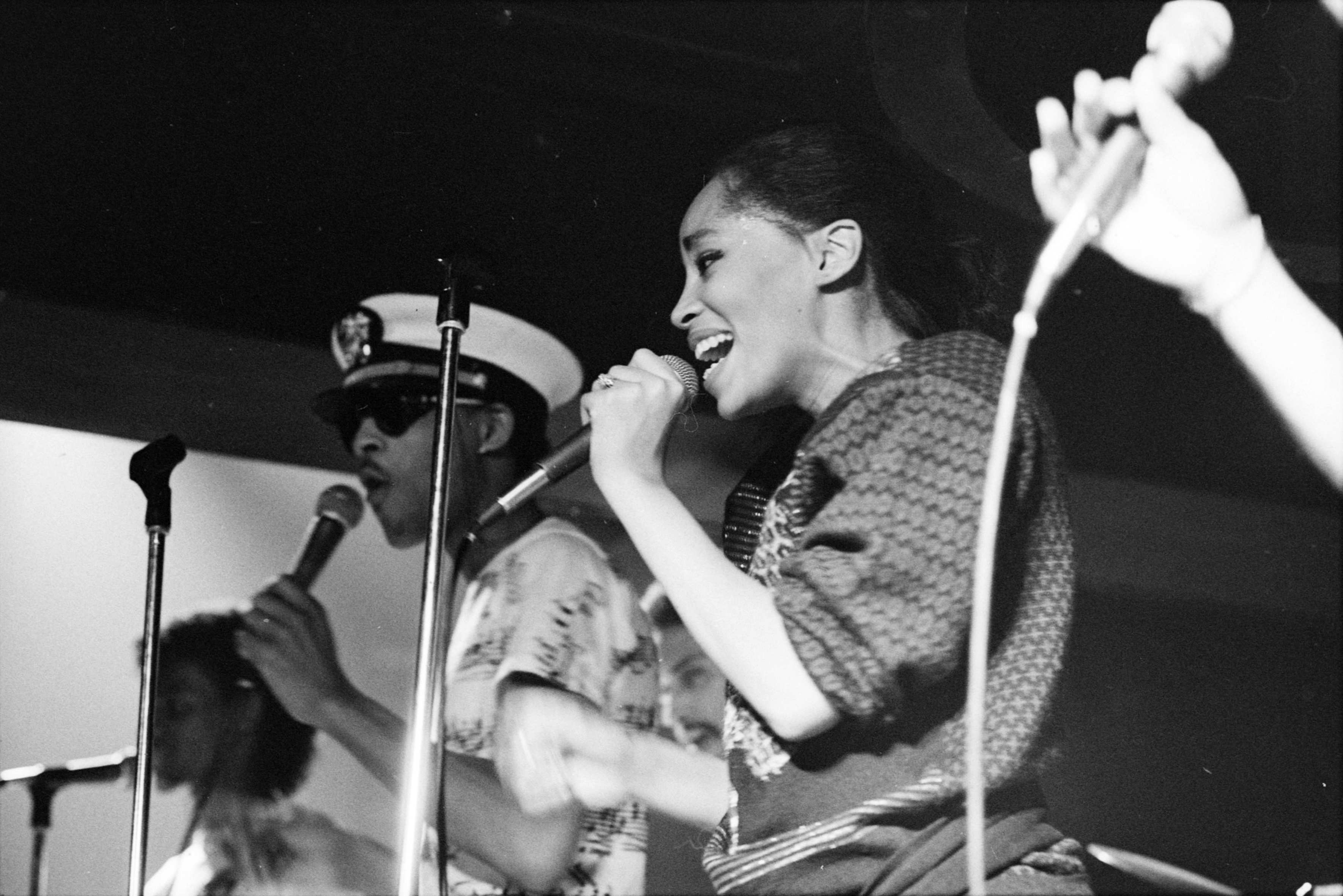
Shalamar in 1982

The Hewett-Watley-Daniel lineup of Shalamar scored a total of three Gold albums in the U.S.: Big Fun (1979), Three for Love (1980) and Friends (1982). In 1983, prior to the release of The Look, Watley and Daniel left Shalamar due to conflicts within the group as well as issues with Dick Griffey and SOLAR. Although The Look wasn't as successful as Friends had been the previous year, it still went Gold in the UK, where it yielded a number of hit singles, including "Disappearing Act", the Grammy-nominated "Dead Giveaway", and "Over and Over", and featured more of a new wave/synth-pop sound than previous albums.

After Micki Free and Delisa Davis replaced Daniel and Watley in the group's lineup, Shalamar reached number 17 on the Billboard Hot 100 with "Dancing in the Sheets", featured on the Footloose soundtrack album, and contributed "Don't Get Stopped in Beverly Hills," written by Hewett, Free, and David "Hawk" Wolinski, to the Beverly Hills Cop soundtrack, which won the 1985 Grammy Award for Best Album of Original Score Written for a Motion Picture or Television Special; the award was given to all 14 of the soundtrack's songwriters. Both "Dancing in the Sheets" and "Don't Get Stopped in Beverly Hills" were included on Shalamar's eighth album, Heartbreak, released in November 1984.

Hewett departed the group in 1985 to begin a solo career, later returning in 2001 and current member since. Sydney Justin took over as lead vocalist for Circumstantial Evidence (1987), coproduced by Babyface and L.A. Reid, and Wake Up (1990), Shalamar's final pair of albums before they disbanded.

== Reunions ==
In 1996, Watley performed with Hewett and Daniel on Babyface's million-selling single "This Is for the Lover in You," a cover of a hit single from Shalamar's 1980 album Three for Love. A music video was shot in which the three former members of Shalamar were digitally reunited on screen. They are credited on this single release under their individual names. Hewett, Watley, and Daniel subsequently joined Babyface and LL Cool J to perform the song on the UK's Top of the Pops in 1996; billed as Shalamar, it marked the classic trio's first and only live performance together since 1983.

In 1999, Howard Hewett and Jeffrey Daniel reformed Shalamar and played in Japan. This was followed by UK tours in 2000, 2001, and 2003. From 2001, Shalamar continued touring with the line up of Howard Hewett, Jeffrey Daniel, and Carolyn Griffey (a long-time friend and fan of the original band's, and daughter of Shalamar's creator and Dick Griffey). Carolyn's mother is Carrie Lucas, for whom Watley sang backing vocals. In 2005, this lineup appeared on the UK television series Hit Me, Baby, One More Time. Shalamar reached the grand finale of Hit Me, Baby, One More Time in May 2005, ultimately losing out to Shakin' Stevens. This was followed by annual concert tours in the UK, Cannes, USA, Nigeria, and Japan.

Shalamar was featured in an episode of TV One's series Unsung, in which Watley, Daniel, and Hewett shared their stories about the group's creation, the lack of payments and royalties from SOLAR, success, egos, and the breakup of the classic lineup. Dick Griffey, Micki Free, Delisa Davis, and Sidney Justin were also interviewed for the episode.

In October 2009, the reconstituted Shalamar of Hewett, Daniel, and Griffey performed as a part of "The Ultimate Boogie Nights Disco Concert Series", at O2 Arena Entertainment in London. This prompted their return to the UK in April 2010 for a tour. Shalamar returned to IndigO2 in October 2011, December 2012, December 2013 and December 2014.

Since 2015 Shalamar featuring Howard, Jeffrey and Carolyn have been performing regularly in the UK with up to thirty shows annually including venues such as: The London Palladium, Birmingham Symphony Hall, Liverpool Philharmonic, The M&S Bank Arena, The Glasgow Royal Concert Hall, Usher Hall (Edinburgh), The Royal Concert Hall Nottingham and many other leading venues. The group have also performed in France, South Africa, Spain, Holland and Mozambique. Festivals where the group performed have included: Boogietown, Soultasia, Love Supreme, The Cambridge Club Festival, Lets Rock and Rewind.

In 2017, Shalamar released their first single since 1991 called "The Real Thing"

As of July 2018, Carrie Lucas and Carolyn Griffey, wife and daughter of Shalamar creator Dick Griffey, officially own all Shalamar licensing across the UK and 28 countries of Europe.

Carolyn Griffey once challenged Jody Watley's trademark of Shalamar in the United States, claiming that she (Griffey) was the sole owner of the name. Watley countered, and the Trademark Trial and Appeal Board ruled in her favor, saying that the petitioner (Griffey) never submitted evidence of her claims. Jody Watley is no longer the registered owner of the US Shalamar trademark as of August 2025.

In September 2023, Shalamar were awarded a stone on the Music Walk Of Fame in Camden. Howard, Jeffrey and Carolyn were in London to accept the award on behalf of all Shalamar members over the years. Speeches and tributes were made by DJ Spoony, Angie Greaves, Neville Staple, Gwen Dickey and Jaki Graham with video tributes from Nile Rodgers, Kathy Sledge, Danny John-Jules, Emeli Sandé, Kid Creole, Tony Blackburn and Alexander O'Neal.

In 2024 the group performed six concerts across the US including the "Fool In Love" Festival which included acts such as Diana Ross, Lionel Richie, Smokey Robinson, The Jacksons and many others.

== Personnel ==
- Jeffrey Daniel – vocals, guitar (1977–1983, 1996-1997, 1999–present)
- Jody Watley – vocals (1977–1983, 1996–1997)
- Gary Mumford – vocals (1976 to 1977)
- Gerald Brown – vocals (1977–1979)
- Howard Hewett – vocals, piano, guitar (1979–1985, 1996–1997, 1999–present)
- Delisa Davis – vocals, keyboards (1983–1991)
- Micki Free – vocals, guitar (1983–1991)
- Sidney Justin – vocals, keyboards (1985–1991)
- Carolyn Griffey – vocals (2001–present)

== Discography ==
Studio albums

- Uptown Festival (1977)
- Disco Gardens (1978)
- Big Fun (1979)
- Three for Love (1980)
- Go for It (1981)
- Friends (1982)
- The Look (1983)
- Heartbreak (1984)
- Circumstantial Evidence (1987)
- Wake Up (1990)

== See also ==
- List of acts who appeared on American Bandstand
- List of artists who reached number one on the Billboard R&B chart
- List of artists who reached number one on the US Dance chart
- List of disco artists (S-Z)
- List of performers on Top of the Pops
