= Micki Free =

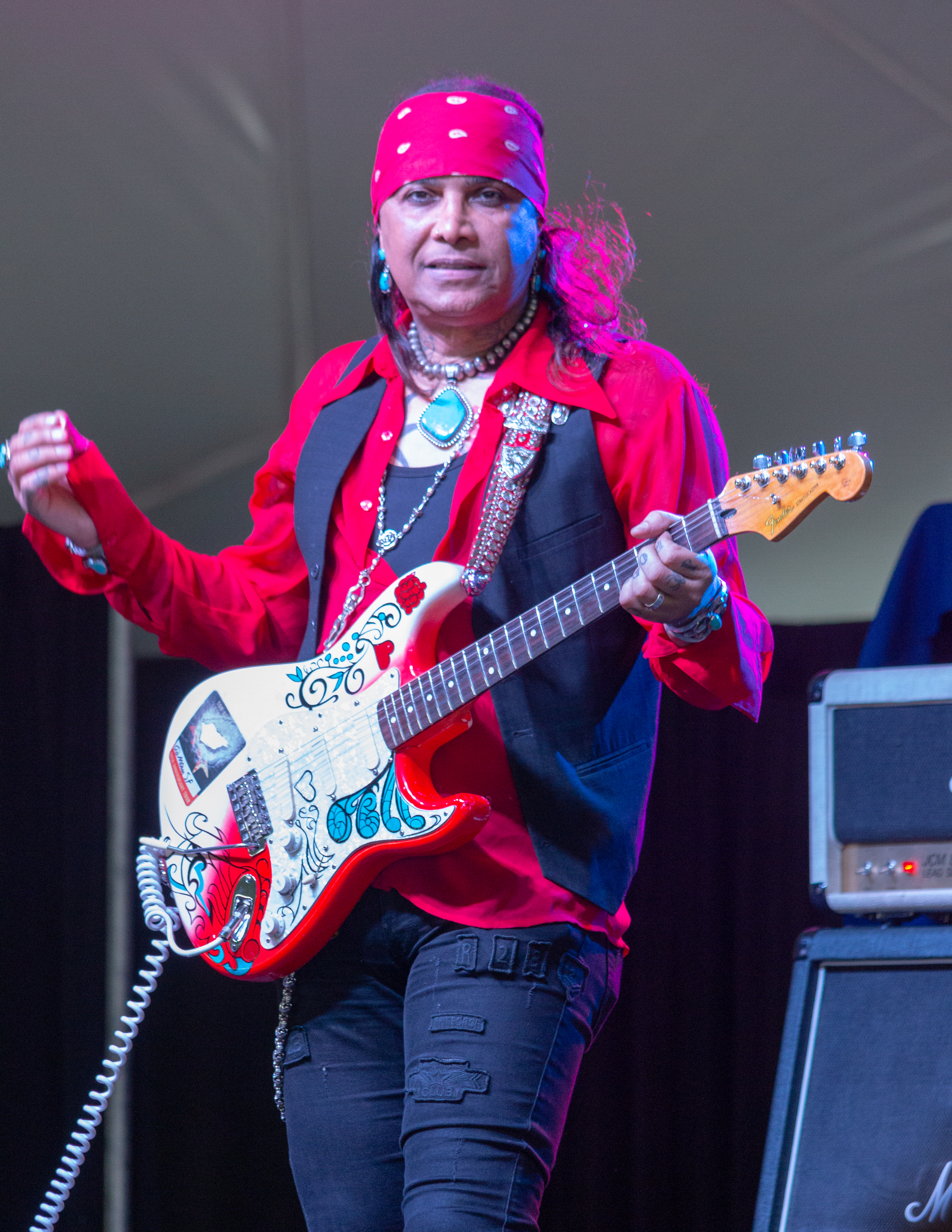
- Free performing at the Kitchener Bluesfest in 2018

Background information
- Born: May 20, 1955 (age 70)
- Genres: Rock, blues, electric blues, blues rock
- Occupations: Musician, songwriter
- Instruments: Guitar, vocals, Native American flute, harmonica
- Labels: Native Music Rocks Records
- Website: The Official Website of Micki Free

Micki Free (born May 20, 1955) is a guitarist and singer of Native American descent. He won a Grammy Award for his contribution to the Beverly Hills Cop (1984) movie soundtrack and has won two Native American Music Awards. He is the director of Promotions and Special Events for the Seminole Tribe of Florida, owners of Hard Rock International.

== Biography ==
Micki Free was born in West Texas and moved to Germany soon afterward. He is of mixed Irish, Comanche, and Cherokee descent. His stepfather, a U.S. Army sergeant, was stationed in Germany, and Free was introduced to rock 'n' roll there as a child, when one of his five sisters received tickets to a Jimi Hendrix concert and took him along to the show. "It just blew my mind", Free remembered.

His family later moved to Illinois, where Free joined the rock band Smokehouse. When he was 17, he was discovered by Gene Simmons of Kiss, during a concert at which Smokehouse was the opening act for Kiss, Ted Nugent, and REO Speedwagon. After Simmons' encouragement, Free joined Shalamar in 1984, just in time for the band's big successes, including a #17 position in U.S. Top 20 in 1984 with "Dancing In The Sheets" from the Footloose soundtrack, and a Grammy for "Don't Get Stopped In Beverly Hills" from the Beverly Hills Cop (1984) soundtrack in 1985. With Shalamar, he was nominated for a Grammy three times.

After Shalamar, Free and Jean Beauvoir (of The Plasmatics) founded an AOR band, Crown of Thorns. Free later founded, The Micki Free Electric Blues Experience, with Jon Brant (formerly of Cheap Trick) on bass, and Curly Smith (formerly of Boston) on drums. Recognition for his musical career after Shalamar came from the Native American Music Awards, where he won in the categories of Male Artist in 2002 and Pop Rock artist in 2004. Free has won to date 5-Native American Music Awards and was recently inducted into The Native American Music Awards Hall of Fame in 2022. Free has recorded with Billy Gibbons of ZZ Top and the DVD/CD/EP release Micki Free Live in Hyde Park featured Bill Wyman, formerly of The Rolling Stones. In 2002, he was cast to play Tonto in a new production of The Lone Ranger.

Native Music Rocks is a music program created by Free, designed to give Native American musicians an opportunity to tour alongside Micki and his band, American Horse Trio. The band features Cindy Blackman-Santana, former drummer for Lenny Kravitz, and David Santos on bass. Free was Director of the Native Music Rocks program and went on to create the first Native American Record company, Native Music Rocks Records, distributed by Fontana/Universal Music. He was a recording artist on the label as well as Chief Creative officer/VP. The event was sponsored by Hard Rock International and the Seminole Tribe of Florida.

Free was invited to appear as part of an all-star cast of Native American musicians, known as Native Rocks, at the American Indian Inaugural Ball in Arlington, Virginia, on the occasion of president Barack Obama's inauguration. He performed with Native Rocks at a related event at the Hard Rock Cafe prior to performing at the Inaugural Ball. Free's release Tattoo Burn (2012), is a blues-rock style album written, produced, arranged, and performed by Free. Micki's latest album to date is Turquoise Blue (2022).

== Parody ==
Free's manner of dress and appearance during the early 1980s (and that of Prince) was parodied in the Chappelle's Show sketch Charlie Murphy's True Hollywood Stories: "Prince - Uncensored" (February 18, 2004). The sketch is a retelling by Charlie Murphy about meeting Prince (played by Dave Chappelle) and engaging in a basketball game, with Prince and the Revolution still wearing their flashy clothes, dominating Murphy and his friends and later serving them pancakes. In a 2016 interview, Free clarified that the events depicted in the sketch were "totally accurate" and that Prince played "like Michael Jordan".

== Discography ==
- Gypsy Cowboy (Brunette, 1995)
- Black Moon...Black Sun (2002)
- Electric Warrior (2002)
- The Sun Chaser: Native American Flute Love Songs (2003)
- Sedona Free (2005)
- Micki Free Experience (Livewire, 2005; Cargo Records, 2006)
- Comanche: Native American Flute Music (2007)
- Micki Free Ambassador of Rock (Cargo Records, 2009) Re-release of Gypsy Cowboy
- American Horse (Native Music Rocks Records, 2010)
- Tattoo Burn (Cargo Records, 2012)
- American Trash with Jean Beauvoir (Frontiers Music, 2015)
- The Native American Flute As Therapy (Mysterium Music, 2016) 2-CD
- Tattoo Burn – Redux (Mysterium Blues Records, 2017) Re-release of Tattoo Burn
- Turquoise Blue (Dark Idol Music/Burnside, 2022)
- Dreamcatcher [5-song EP] (Bungalo Records/UMe, 2024)
