= Leon Sylvers III =

American singer-songwriter (born 1953)

- Born: Leon Frank Sylvers III; March 7, 1953 (age 73); South Bend, Indiana, U.S.
- Origin: Los Angeles, California, U.S.
- Genres: R&B, dance, soul, disco, funk
- Occupations: Musician, producer, songwriter
- Instruments: Vocals, bass guitar
- Years active: 1958–present
- Labels: MGM, Capitol (with The Sylvers); SOLAR (with Dynasty); Motown (solo)

Leon Frank Sylvers III (born March 7, 1953) is an American singer, songwriter, disc-jockey, record producer and multi-instrumentalist. He was a member of the family group The Sylvers and became one of the most successful producers in Black music in the late 1970s to the mid-1980s through his association with Dick Griffey's SOLAR Records. Artists such as J Dilla, Dr. Dre, and Madlib have sampled songs written and produced by him.

== Biography ==
=== Beginnings ===
Leon Sylvers was born on the campus of Indiana University South Bend, where his father was studying. Three days later his family moved to Memphis, Tennessee. When Sylvers was two or three, in 1956, they took the train and moved to Los Angeles "near Adams and Crenshaw," due to his father finding work there. He cites discovering Motown at around the age of seven, especially bassist James Jamerson and drummer Benny Benjamin, as his first and main musical influence. At the same time, his father taught Sylvers and his siblings four- and five-part harmony in the style of the Four Freshmen. Musical genes also ran in the family from his mother who sang opera.

Sylvers first rose to prominence in the early 1960s as a member of The Little Angels harmony vocal group featuring his siblings (Olympia, Charmaine, and James). After hearing them perform in Las Vegas in 1959, Ed Sullivan predicted they would become famous. During this time they appeared on variety shows such as Make Room for Daddy, You Bet Your Life, and The Spike Jones Show. They also toured the United States with Ray Charles.

Following their parents' divorce, Leon and his older siblings went to live with various relatives before reuniting with their mother Shirley and their four younger siblings in Los Angeles, California. His siblings and mother moved to Watts in 1965. In 1970, Leon entered the family act, which now included younger brothers Edmund and Ricky, into a local talent contest. They won that talent contest hands down due to their versatility, choreography, and harmonies. The impresario Mike Curb signed them to MGM Records in 1971 and marketed them as The Sylvers.

Leon wrote his first hit single "Wish That I Could Talk to You", which was on the family's 1972 debut album called The Sylvers. He also wrote "Fool's Paradise", "Only One Can Win", "I Know Myself", "Chaos", "So Close", and "How Love Hurts". The album was co-produced by Jerry Butler, who was widely known for his work with The Impressions as well as a successful solo career, and Keg Johnson. The following year he penned his brother Foster Sylvers' Top 10 US R&B chart single "Misdemeanor" which was a hit during summer of 1973. The Sylvers released their second album The Sylvers II the same year, with Leon writing nine of the album's 11 songs. The Associated Press praised the album for projecting "a feeling of togetherness and strength not so evident on their first album.

In 1974 The Sylvers released their final album on MGM before moving to Capitol. Leon only wrote two of the album's ten songs. At the time of the album's release The Pittsburgh Courier wrote, "They are impressive, elegantly poised, demonstrate musicianship and their sound is fresh and original."

For the next several albums, Leon would continue writing songs on his family's albums which included 1977's Top 10 US R&B chart single "High School Dance". In 1978 Leon produced The Sylvers most critically acclaimed album, Forever Yours. Prior to the album's release, The Sylvers were frequent musical guests on TV shows and earned $15–20,000 per night for performances at county fairs and amusement parks. By mid-1978, Leon left the group to become the in-house producer for Dick Griffey's SOLAR Records, where he also worked as the label's A & R director. The Los Angeles Times would later call him, "the creative genius behind the SOLAR sound."

Sylvers started his major production career with the band Lakeside on their album Shot of love which was Top 10 on Top R&B Albums. This would also be the year that Leon's association with Shalamar would begin, starting with the Disco Gardens album which included the disco classic "Take That to the Bank". 1979 would become an even bigger year. Shalamar's next album Big Fun was an even bigger smash landing at #4 on the Top R&B Albums charts and was certified gold. The first single, "The Second Time Around", was a hit record number one on both the US R&B charts and number eight on the US Top 40|Top 10. Leon also co-produced Lakeside's Rough Riders album.

That same year Leon created the group Dynasty along with Dick Griffey. Group member Linda Carriere credits him with coming up with the group name, which was a reference to the group's goal "to have longevity in the entertainment world."

=== Success ===
The 1980s started off well for Leon: in 1980, he produced albums for SOLAR acts such as Shalamar, The Whispers, Dynasty, Carrie Lucas, and the first album by Midnight Star. One song he wrote and co-produced for The Whispers was the number one US R&B and US Dance hit, "And the Beat Goes On", which would be one of Sylvers' biggest achievements. This would be the year that Leon would be involved on projects outside of the SOLAR Records family such as his Gene Page single "Love Starts After Dark" and 7th Wonder's song "The Tilt". Shalamar would chart with their Three for Love album at number eight on the US Top Soul Albums. The album would be certified Platinum. The Whispers' "It's a Love Thing" was another R&B smash which helped propel the Imagination album to number three on the Top Soul Albums charts. Noting his success, Billboard magazine described him as, "the man of the hour in R & B."

In 1981, Leon described his production process by saying, "My ideal is to have the whole record sing, to work on the music tracks so they take on the same character as the vocals." He also focused on making brief, energetic songs, telling one interviewer, "Short, punchy records are better today than long ones. I try not to think in terms of pop or R & B, because you can get lost in the shuffle. The answer may be a fusion between the two styles." At this time, Leon joined Dynasty, and married Nidra Beard, also a member of Dynasty. Around the same time, Leon produced his old family group (The Sylvers), who had signed with SOLAR. Neither The Second Adventure by Dynasty and Concept by The Sylvers, which Leon produced, were hits. These albums would be two of the few disappointments of the year for Leon.

In 1982, Leon produced Shalamar's album Friends. The album topped the US Top R&B Albums chart, propelled by the single "A Night to Remember", which reached number eight on the US R&B charts. The album would be certified Platinum. Leon spent the next couple of years producing hit songs for The Whispers ("In the Raw", "Tonight"), Gladys Knight & the Pips ("Save the Overtime (For Me)"), Tavares ("Ten to One") among others. In that same year, he served as mentor to the production team Jimmy Jam and Terry Lewis. Dick Griffey said of Leon at the time, "Aside from Quincy Jones, I think Leon is the hottest producer around. He's grown with SOLAR and has been exposed to other creative forces in putting together different kinds of songs and sounds. He's gotten a different kind of polish and sophistication."

=== Mid- to late-80s ===
By 1984, Leon met Krystol members Tina Scott and Roberta Stiger at a Hollywood burger stand and asked to audition them. They ended up singing backup vocals on several of his projects and he produced songs on their 1984 album Gettin' Ready and 1985's Talk Of The Town. He was involved with fewer hits due to the changing climate in R&B music. He did have some success with Glenn Jones' second album Finesse, and some tracks for The Whispers album So Good. Between 1984 and 1988 Leon would have moderate success with Five Star ("Another Weekend", "Rock My World"), Evelyn "Champagne" King ("Flirt," "Hold On to What You Got"), Stacy Lattisaw ("You Ain't Leavin'"), The Spinners, Howard Hewett ("I Commit to Love"), Krystol ("After the Dance Is Through)). In 1985, Leon joined the Motown-distributed label Conceited Records as the vice president of music and produced the label's first album. In 1989, Leon finally recorded a solo album for Motown Records, called simply Leon Sylvers III, but it failed to chart.

=== Recent work ===
In the '90s Leon would work with R&B New Jack Producer Teddy Riley on his group Blackstreet's debut album Blackstreet. Leon helped co-write Blackstreet's US Top 10 hit "Before I Let You Go". Leon would also work with Riley again this time helping write two songs on New Kids on the Block's Face the Music as well as the song "Love Online" on Guy's reunion album Guy III. Riley credited Leon for his ability to make lyrics work with a given melody, saying he was "probably the number one best."

In 1992 Leon co-produced nine of the 10 songs on Double Action Theatre's self-titled debut on PolyGram. The album received mixed reviews, with one critic writing, "the group gets caught up in its own hype, forgetting that before a singer can deliver a message, he first has to deliver a song."

In 2009, Sylvers produced an album from N'dambi, Pink Elephant, which included songs written by Sylvers and his son, Leon Sylvers IV.

In December 2010, Leon Sylvers III received a Grammy nomination from the National Academy of Recording Arts and Sciences for Best Engineered Album, Non-Classical, for N'dambi's album Pink Elephant.

In 2011, he remixed Gladys Knight's new single, a re-recording of the Leiber/Stoller classic "I (Who Have Nothing)", a recording produced by his son, Leon Sylvers IV.

In 2015, Sylvers collaborated with Dâm-Funk on his third album Invite The Light. Sylvers once served as a mentor to Dâm-Funk in the early 1990s.

In 2019, Sylvers started producing and writing with Pop / R&B singer / songwriter Nikkole on her fifth album to be released in 2021'.
