= The Second Time Around (Shalamar song) =

1979 single by Shalamar

Single by Shalamar

from the album Big Fun
- B-side: "Leave It All Up to Love"
- Released: August 1979
- Recorded: 1979
- Genre: Electro-funk; post-disco
- Length: 7:13 (album version); 3:40 (single version)
- Label: SOLAR Records
- Songwriters: Leon Sylvers III, William Shelby
- Producer: Leon Sylvers III

Shalamar singles chronology
"Stay Close to Me" (1978)	"The Second Time Around" (1979)	"Right in the Socket" (1980)

Audio
- "The Second Time Around" on YouTube

"The Second Time Around" is a 1979 hit by Los Angeles–based group Shalamar. The song is the first single from their album, Big Fun. Released in August 1979, the single went to number one on the soul chart and was their most successful hit on the Hot 100 pop chart, reaching number eight in early 1980. "The Second Time Around" also went to number one on the disco/dance chart in January 1980. The song was produced by Leon Sylvers III, who cowrote the song with William Shelby.

In 1980, the band made a promotion of "The Second Time Around" for the radio station KJR in Seattle, called "The Sonics Came to Play," dedicated to the Seattle SuperSonics who had won the NBA Championship the previous year.

== Samples ==
Missy Elliott interpolated it in her song "Is This Our Last Time?" from her This Is Not a Test! album.

== Charts ==
Chart (1979–80)	Peak position
Australia (Kent Music Report)	96
Canada Top Singles (RPM)	49
U.S. Billboard Hot 100	8
U.S. Billboard Hot Soul Singles	1
U.S. Billboard US Dance	1
U.S. Billboard Adult Contemporary	47

Year-end chart (1980)	Rank
US Top Pop Singles (Billboard)	44

== See also ==
- List of number-one dance singles of 1980 (U.S.)
- List of number-one R&B singles of 1980 (U.S.)
- List of post-disco artists and songs
