= Dick Griffey =

American music producer (1938–2010)

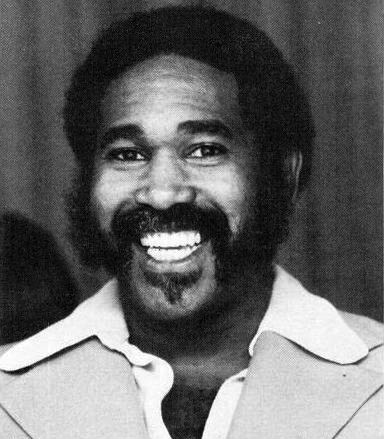
- Dick Griffey in 1974
- Born: Richard Gilbert Griffey; November 16, 1938; Nashville, Tennessee, U.S.
- Died: September 24, 2010 (aged 71); Los Angeles, California, U.S.
- Occupation(s): Record executive, record producer, concert promoter, songwriter, talent coordinator
- Years active: 1962–2010
- Spouse: Carrie Lucas (m. 1974)
- Children: 4

Richard Gilbert Griffey (November 16, 1938 – September 24, 2010) was an American record producer and music promoter who founded SOLAR Records, an acronym for "Sound of Los Angeles Records". The label played a major role in developing a funk-oriented blend of disco, R&B and soul music during the 1970s and 1980s. As a concert promoter, Griffey arranged bookings for artists such as James Brown, The Sylvers, Aretha Franklin, Jon Gibson, Stevie Wonder and the Jacksons.

== Biography ==
Richard Gilbert Griffey was born on November 16, 1938. He was raised by his mother, Juanita Hines, and stepfather in the housing projects of Nashville, Tennessee. There he was a drummer in local nightclubs during his teens. After briefly attending Tennessee State University, he enlisted in the United States Navy at age 17. He was a medic and worked as a private-duty nurse after completing his military service.

After moving to Los Angeles in the 1960s, Griffey became part owner of Guys and Dolls, a nightclub which featured performances by such rising stars as Isaac Hayes and Ike & Tina Turner. Eventually he branched into concert promotion, earning the moniker "Kingpin of Soul Promoters". Griffey toured with the girl group Honey Cone and handled their finances. He was engaged to Carolyn Willis of the group in 1971.

Griffey worked as talent coordinator on Soul Train, the musical variety show created by Don Cornelius. Together they established The Soul Train Club in 1974 and Soul Train Records in 1975. After purchasing Cornelius' share in the Cornelius-Griffey Entertainment Company, encompassing Soul Train Records, artists and publishing catalog Griffey reconstituted the label into SOLAR Records (an acronym for Sound of Los Angeles Records) in 1977. Music critic Stephen Holden, of The New York Times, predicted a bright future for the label in the pop market, writing a profile under the headline "Solar Could Be the Motown of the 80's". SOLAR acts included Shalamar, which produced such hits as "The Second Time Around" and "This Is for the Lover in You". With The Whispers, SOLAR released such hits as "And the Beat Goes On" (co-written by Griffey) and "Rock Steady". Other acts signed by SOLAR during the 1980s were The Deele, Dynasty, Klymaxx, Lakeside, Midnight Star and The Whispers.

After Jon Gibson was signed to Griffey's subsidiary label, Constellation Records, Griffey would have fun tricking a number of his artists with Gibson's demo tape (with people thinking it was Stevie Wonder). Gibson's debut came as a guest vocalist for three songs on Bill Wolfer's album, Wolf. During the process of making the album, Gibson met his musical idol, Wonder. They worked with a crew of other musicians, including Michael Jackson. Wolfer then produced Gibson's debut album, Standing on the One (1983). The debut showed that Gibson was more than a Wonder-clone, and that he had talented song-writing skills to go with his strong vocals.

Babyface, who had been frustrated in his role as a background singer with The Deele, credited Griffey with encouraging him to step out on his own and pursue a solo career. Babyface said that Griffey told him "If they don't want you to sing all the time, you should be doing your own thing". In a statement released after Griffey's death, producer Quincy Jones said Griffey's "fingerprints were on some of the biggest hits of the '80s". Stevie Wonder, one of the artists Griffey promoted, said that "Professionally, I could not talk about my life without there being a chapter on how Dick Griffey, as a promoter, helped to build my career". Griffey, who also promoted Kool & the Gang, was mentioned by the founding members as the one who suggested they needed a permanent lead singer. Therefore, the group picked James "J.T." Taylor to front the band.

In the early 1990s, Griffey had a hand in launching the rap label Death Row Records, which was co-founded by ex-N.W.A star Dr. Dre and one-time bodyguard Suge Knight. It was Griffey's SOLAR studios in which portions of Dr. Dre's seminal album, The Chronic, was recorded. However, in July 1997, Griffey along with one-time N.W.A associate and rapper Tracy "The D.O.C." Curry sued Death Row claiming they were "pushed out" of their share in ownership and profits from the record label by Knight and Dre.

== Death and legacy ==
Griffey died at the age of 71 on September 24, 2010. He had been recuperating after undergoing quadruple coronary artery bypass surgery, at a rehabilitation center in Canoga Park, Los Angeles. He was survived by his wife Carrie Lucas, a singer he married in 1974; four children and five grandchildren.

His daughter, Carolyn Griffey, joined Shalamar in 2005. She currently performs as a member.

Griffey is featured in the documentary series, Profiles of African-American Success. In 2018, Lucas, Carolyn Griffey, Lucas Griffey and Chinese music promoter Jessie Tsang relaunched the Solar Records and Soul Train Records in the UK. The relaunch was covered in the UK magazine Soul Survivors. Jessie Tsang is CEO with Sonia Damney as Vice President. Carrie Lucas also owns trade mark rights to Shalamar in the UK and Europe. In 2022 Carrie Lucas participated with US cable channel TV One for a special episode of the Unsung TV series on Dick Griffey and Solar Records. The episode aired on November 6 2022.
