= SOLAR Records =

American record label

- Founded: 1978; 48 years ago
- Founder: Dick Griffey
- Distributors: RCA Records (1977-1981); Elektra Records (1981-1986); Capitol Records (1986-1989); Epic Records (1989-1993)
- Genre: Soul; funk; disco; post-disco; boogie; R&B
- Country of origin: United States
- Location: Los Angeles, California

SOLAR (acronym for Sound of Los Angeles Records) was an American record label founded in 1978 by Dick Griffey, reconstituted out of Soul Train Records only three years after it was founded with Soul Train television show host and creator Don Cornelius.

== History ==
SOLAR began in 1975 as Soul Train Records, founded by Dick Griffey and Soul Train creator Don Cornelius. The first act they signed was an R&B vocal quartet they named The Soul Train Gang (Gerald Brown, Terry Brown, Judy Jones, Patricia Williamson, and later Denise Smith), who performed one of Soul Train's many themes, "Soul Train '75". Their first album was entitled Don Cornelius Presents The Soul Train Gang. In 1976, their second album, The Soul Train Gang, produced by Philly's Norman Harris, was released. The Gang broke up in 1977.

That same year, singer/drummer Arnie Oliver, aka Ahaguna G. Sun, and singer/guitarist Werner "Bear" Schuchner formed Sunbear, a little-known soul/funk vocal duo that recorded in Los Angeles in 1977. Earth, Wind & Fire was a heavy influence on Sunbear, and there were also hints of Tower of Power and El Chicano in their sound. In 1977, Sunbear recorded its self-titled debut album for Don Cornelius and Dick Griffey's Soul Train Records, which evolved into Solar Records after Cornelius' departure in 1978. Sunbear broke up without ever recording a second album, and Oliver and Schuchner both went on to pursue other activities in the R&B world. Oliver became a member of Frankie Beverly's Maze, while Schuchner played guitar on albums by the Whispers, the Soul Train Gang, High Inergy, and others. In 1980, the Whispers recorded Sunbear's ballad "Fantasy" for their hit album Imagination.

Griffey formed a collective called Shalamar, using a host of session singers to record "Uptown Festival," a disco-length medley of early Motown hits. After scoring a hit with the recording, he looked to Cornelius to help him put together an actual group to maintain the impact. In 1977, Soul Train dancers Jody Watley and Jeffrey Daniels and former Soul Train Gang member Gerald Brown (who was eventually replaced by Howard Hewett) were recruited to form the new Shalamar, which would become the fledgling label's centerpiece. Cornelius wanted to shut down the label and Griffey paid him $300,000 for his interests in the label. Cornelius wanted to focus his energies on the TV show — which was a monster hit and required his full attention to keep it so. With legalities now taken care of, Griffey reorganized Soul Train Records into the newly founded SOLAR label in late 1977. Griffey and Cornelius remained good friends, and as a result SOLAR maintained close ties to the Soul Train show.

=== Success ===
SOLAR was known for several others who enjoyed success, including: The Whispers, Dynasty, Lakeside, Midnight Star, Klymaxx, Calloway, Carrie Lucas, Collage and The Deele — which introduced singer/songwriter/producer Kenneth "Babyface" Edmonds and future music executive Antonio "L.A." Reid. Griffey had always believed in giving new talents the opportunity to create and develop their craft, and he was introduced to songwriters/producers Jimmy Jam and Terry Lewis by his A & R rep Dina R. Andrews (Dina Andrews Management Inc) who was the team's first manager, Reggie and Vincent Calloway, and Leon F. Sylvers III. The "SOLAR sound" was a collective effort, with artists working on each other's sessions and artists encouraged to be creative. Sylvers became SOLAR's house producer in 1978 and his signature basslines and productions helped mould the hit sound of SOLAR, which is funky, progressive dance music infused with soul and disco.

=== Decline ===
By 1987, the label began to see its commercial fortunes decline. Contributing to the decline were A&R problems with Shalamar, primarily, maintaining the group's identity and momentum as former members Hewett and Watley had departed and were having successful solo careers on other labels. The shifting musical directions of R&B, dance and popular music in general in the late 1980s and early 1990s also contributed to their decline.

=== Distribution ===
From 1977 to 1981, SOLAR was distributed by RCA Records, which had also distributed the Soul Train Records label during its two-year run. Griffey formed a second label, Constellation Records (no relation to the Chicago-based indie label founded by Ewart Abner) in 1981, which focused on more contemporary and top forty-geared acts to Griffey's more traditionally "urban" establishment (including Jon Gibson and Klymaxx). Upon its formation, Constellation was distributed through Elektra/Asylum Records, making it only natural for the main SOLAR label to jump ship to Elektra for distribution when it left RCA.

In the meantime, the Constellation label moved to MCA Records for distribution in 1984. Shortly thereafter, Griffey decided to abandon contemporary music to focus all of his attention on running SOLAR, and retaining its sonic theme. Subsequently, MCA bought the Constellation imprint and absorbed its artists, including Klymaxx, which had been its biggest act.

SOLAR's relationship with Elektra lasted until 1986. After the Elektra distribution deal expired, SOLAR briefly took up distribution with Capitol Records until 1989, at which time it signed a new distribution deal with Epic Records, which oversaw what would ultimately become its twilight years. In the early 1990s, the label released its last recordings- 1991's Now by Richie Havens and Times 3's eponymous debut album, the soundtrack to the 1992 film Deep Cover, 3rd Avenue's 1992 debut album Let's Talk About Love, and 1993 The Deele album An Invitation To Love.

Part of the label's back catalog, which includes the pre-1984 Constellation back catalog, were licensed by EMI in 1996, with many of its releases and compilations being re-issued through The Right Stuff Records. In 2009, Unidisc Music purchased part of SOLAR's back catalog for Canada, US and South African territories. BMG owns the rights to part of the SOLAR catalog in the UK and Europe although the rights to SOLAR RECORDS as a trade mark and brand belong to the family of the late Dick Griffey according to the Intellectual Property Office.

=== UK relaunch ===
In 2018, 40 years after the founding of SOLAR Records, the label was relaunched in the UK by the family of the late Dick Griffey, according to issue 77 of UK Publication 'Soul Survivors Magazine' which featured an interview with both Carrie Lucas and new CEO Jessie Tsang. At the helm of the relaunched label is Griffey's widow Carrie Lucas, his daughter Carolyn Griffey and British Chinese music promoter and IP paralegal consultant Jessie Tsang. Solar Records incorporates the Soul Train Records and Soul Train Club brands. Jessie Tsang is CEO with Sonia Damney as Vice President. In 2022 Carrie Lucas, Carolyn Griffey, Dina Andrews, Virgil Roberts participated with US Cable channel TV One for a special episode of the UNSUNG TV series on Dick Griffey and Solar Records. The episode premiered on November 6, 2022.

=== Solar and Soul Train Records Legacy Today ===
The Solar Records legacy continues today with the Solar Records and Soul Train Records brands licensed to Solar Legacy Entertainment Ltd and Galaxy of Stars Ltd. The Solar Legacy Entertainment Ltd company includes attorney at law Virgil Roberts who previously was president and legal counsel for Solar Records and Dick Griffey. Solar Legacy Entertainment also acquired music catalog rights to historic master recordings and also new music catalogs. Other ventures include the continuation of the 'Soul Train Club' radio show which has been broadcasting on Solar Radio since 2017.

As of 2023 Galaxy of Stars Ltd oversees the live entertainment and music interests of the brands which includes the Soul Train Club and Solar Records. In December 2023 Solar entered into a TV and Film publishing deal due to be announced in 2024. Earmarked for release in 2024 is a new single by Kimberly Brown of Sounds of Blackness.

As of 2024 Virgil Roberts and Jessie Tsang on behalf of Solar Legacy Entertainment Ltd, entered into a deal with the famed Hollywood author, TV and film producer Tina Andrews for a Dick Griffey and Solar Records motion picture deal. Solar Legacy Entertainment Ltd also own a number of master recording rights to recordings by Soul Train Gang, Carrie Lucas, Klymaxx, Sunbear, Snoop Dogg and Dr Dre and the sound track to the film Deep Cover. Part of Solar's new catalog includes new music by Leon Sylvers III, Dana Meyers, Freddie Lee Peterkin, Brian K Morgan and Katie Goulet and Dick Griffey's grandson Kid3rd.

== Artists ==
- Absolute
- Babyface
- Calloway
- Carrie Lucas
- Collage
- The Deele
- Dynasty
- Jeffrey Daniel
- Klymaxx
- Lakeside
- Midnight Star
- Ralph Butler
- Shalamar
- The Soul Train Gang
- The Sylvers
- The Whispers
- Times 3
- 1-900
- 3rd Avenue

== In-house producers ==
- Leon Sylvers III (1978-1983)
- Reggie Calloway (1983-1986)
- L.A. Reid & Babyface (1986-1989)

== In-house writers ==
Tania Carmenatti, Dana Meyers, Dennis "Den Den" Nelson, Dynasty members Nidra Beard & William Shelby, The Time member Ricky Darnell "Freeze" Smith, The Sylvers member Charmaine Sylvers, and Johnny Thomas Jr. were frequent writing collaborators on various SOLAR albums and/or for various SOLAR acts. Credits are courtesy of Tidal and Spotify. (A majority of Beard and Shelby's written contributions to their own group are omitted)

Title	Year	Artist	Album	Label
"The Second Time Around" (Shelby)	1979	Shalamar	Big Fun	SOLAR
"Are You Dancing" (Shelby)	1979	Carrie Lucas	Carrie Lucas in Danceland	SOLAR
"I'm Gonna Make You Happy" (Shelby)	1979	Carrie Lucas	Carrie Lucas in Danceland	SOLAR
"And the Beat Goes On" (Shelby)	1979	The Whispers	The Whispers	SOLAR
"Out the Box" (Shelby)	1979	The Whispers	The Whispers	SOLAR
"I've Just Begun to Love You" (Shelby, Smith)	1980	Dynasty	Adventures in the Land of Music	SOLAR
"Adventures in the Land of Music" (Smith)	1980	Dynasty	Adventures in the Land of Music	SOLAR
"It's a Love Thing" (Meyers, Shelby)	1980	The Whispers	Imagination	SOLAR
"I Can Make It Better" (Meyers, Shelby)	1980	The Whispers	Imagination	SOLAR
"Attention to My Baby" (Shelby)	1980	Shalamar	Three for Love	SOLAR
"Somewhere There's a Love" (Shelby)	1980	Shalamar	Three for Love	SOLAR
"Some Things Never Change" (Meyers, Shelby)	1980	Shalamar	Three for Love	SOLAR
"Make That Move" (Shelby, Smith)	1980	Shalamar	Three for Love	SOLAR
"This Is for the Lover in You" (Meyers)	1980	Shalamar	Three for Love	SOLAR
"Work It Out" (Beard)	1980	Shalamar	Three for Love	SOLAR
"Pop Along Kid" (Beard)	1980	Shalamar	Three for Love	SOLAR
"It's Not What You Got (It's How You Use It)" (Shelby)	1980	Carrie Lucas	Portrait of Carrie	SOLAR
"Career Girl" (Beard)	1980	Carrie Lucas	Portrait of Carrie	SOLAR
"Fashion" (Beard, Shelby)	1980	Carrie Lucas	Portrait of Carrie	SOLAR
"In The Raw" (Meyers, Sylvers)	1981	The Whispers	Love Is Where You Find It	SOLAR
"Turn Me Out" (Beard, Meyers, Shelby)	1981	The Whispers	Love Is Where You Find It	SOLAR
"Cruisin' In" (Beard, Sylvers)	1981	The Whispers	Love Is Where You Find It	SOLAR
"Emergency" (Beard, Shelby)	1981	The Whispers	Love Is Where You Find It	SOLAR
"Reach Out" (Beard, Sylvers)	1981	The Sylvers	Concept	SOLAR
"Come Back Lover, Come Back" (Beard, Shelby)	1981	The Sylvers	Concept	SOLAR
"I'm Getting Over" (Beard, Shelby)	1981	The Sylvers	Concept	SOLAR
"Taking Over" (Meyers, Sylvers)	1981	The Sylvers	Concept	SOLAR
"P.S. (The Unfinished Letter)" (Meyers)	1981	The Sylvers	Concept	SOLAR
"Pain Got a Hold on Me" (Meyers, Shelby)	1981	Dynasty	The Second Adventure	SOLAR
"High Time (I Left You Baby)" (Meyers)	1981	Dynasty	The Second Adventure	SOLAR
"Sweeter as the Days Go By" (Smith)	1981	Shalamar	Go for It	SOLAR
"Good Feelings" (Shelby)	1981	Shalamar	Go for It	SOLAR
"Strokin'" (Smith)	1982	Dynasty	Right Back at Cha!	SOLAR
"Does That Ring A Bell" (Meyers)	1982	Dynasty	Right Back at Cha!	SOLAR
"Straight Out" (Meyers)	1982	Dynasty	Right Back at Cha!	SOLAR
"That's the Way I Feel About You" (Meyers, Shelby, Smith)	1982	Dynasty	Right Back at Cha!	SOLAR
"A Night to Remember" (Beard, Meyers, Sylvers)	1982	Shalamar	Friends	SOLAR
"Help Me" (Beard)	1982	Shalamar	Friends	SOLAR
"On Top Of The World" (Meyers)	1982	Shalamar	Friends	SOLAR
"I Don't Wanna Be the Last to Know" (Beard, Shelby)	1982	Shalamar	Friends	SOLAR
"Friends" (Beard, Shelby)	1982	Shalamar	Friends	SOLAR
"Playing To Win" (Sylvers)	1982	Shalamar	Friends	SOLAR
"I Just Stopped Because I Had To" (Beard)	1982	Shalamar	Friends	SOLAR
"There It Is" (Beard, Meyers, Sylvers)	1982	Shalamar	Friends	SOLAR
"I Can Make You Feel Good" (Shelby)	1982	Shalamar	Friends	SOLAR
"The Man In My Life" (Meyers)	1982	Klymaxx	Girls Will Be Girls	SOLAR
"Don't Hide Your Love" (Shelby)	1982	Klymaxx	Girls Will Be Girls	SOLAR
"Men" (Shelby)	1982	Carrie Lucas	Still in Love	SOLAR
"I Just Can't Do Without Your Love" (Shelby)	1982	Carrie Lucas	Still in Love	SOLAR
"Keep Your Love Around" (Meyers, Shelby)	1983	The Whispers	Love for Love	SOLAR
"Closer" (Meyers)	1983	Shalamar	The Look	SOLAR
"Disappearing Act" (Meyers)	1983	Shalamar	The Look	SOLAR
"Over and Over" (Shelby)	1983	Shalamar	The Look	SOLAR
"You Won't Miss Love (Until It's Gone)" (Smith)	1983	Shalamar	The Look	SOLAR
"So Good" (Smith)	1984	The Whispers	So Good	SOLAR
"In One Love And Out The Other" (Meyers)	1984	The Sylvers	Bizarre	Geffen
"Got To Be Crazy" (Meyers)	1984	The Sylvers	Bizarre	Geffen
"Step Right Up" (Meyers)	1985	Collage	Shine The Light	MCA
"Tuff Love" (Beard, Shelby, Smith)	1986	Dynasty	Daydreamin'	SOLAR
"Love I Can Bank On" (Meyers (Producer))	1987	Lakeside	Power	SOLAR
"Way Out" (Shelby)	1988	Dynasty	Out of Control	SOLAR
"You Come First" (Meyers (Producer))	1989	Ralph Butler	Sincerely Yours	SOLAR
"Cheap Shot" (Carmenatti, Nelson)	1990	Absolute	For All Seasons	SOLAR / Epic
"Crazy Little Thing Called Love" (Carmenatti, Nelson)	1990	Absolute	For All Seasons	SOLAR / Epic
"I Count On Your Love" (Smith)	1990	Absolute	For All Seasons	SOLAR / Epic
"For All Seasons" (Carmenatti, Smith)	1990	Absolute	For All Seasons	SOLAR / Epic
"Kiss Me" (Smith)	1990	Absolute	For All Seasons	SOLAR / Epic
"When We're Eye To Eye" (Smith)	1990	Absolute	For All Seasons	SOLAR / Epic
"Why Lead Me On" (Carmenatti, Thomas)	1990	Shalamar	Wake Up	SOLAR / Epic
"Pink Box" (Carmenatti, Thomas)	1990	Shalamar	Wake Up	SOLAR / Epic
"Let The Moon Shine" (Carmenatti)	1990	Lakeside	Party Patrol	SOLAR / Epic
"Money" (Nelson)	1990	Lakeside	Party Patrol	SOLAR / Epic
"Sailing" (Nelson)	1990	Lakeside	Party Patrol	SOLAR / Epic
"So Fine" (Shelby, Smith)	1990	Lakeside	Party Patrol	SOLAR / Epic
"You're The Only One" (Smith)	1990	Lakeside	Party Patrol	SOLAR / Epic
"Gotta Lambada" (Carmenatti, Smith)	1990	Absolute	Lambada Soundtrack	SOLAR / Epic
"Rock Lambada" (Smith, Thomas)	1990	Johnny Thomas Jr.	Lambada Soundtrack	SOLAR / Epic
"Sata" (Carmenatti, Nelson)	1990	Brenda K. Starr	Lambada Soundtrack	SOLAR / Epic
"Give It Up" (Carmenatti, Nelson)	1990	Judette Warren	Lambada Soundtrack	SOLAR / Epic
"Another Lover" (Carmenatti, Nelson)	1992	3rd Avenue	Let's Talk About Love	SOLAR / Epic
"Sneaking In The Alley With Sally" (Nelson)	1992	3rd Avenue	Let's Talk About Love	SOLAR / Epic
"Annie's Apple Pie" (Carmenatti, Thomas)	1992	3rd Avenue	Let's Talk About Love	SOLAR / Epic
"Let's Take Our Time" (Nelson)	1992	3rd Avenue	Let's Talk About Love	SOLAR / Epic
"Let's Talk About Love" (Nelson)	1992	3rd Avenue	Let's Talk About Love	SOLAR / Epic
"Playing The Fool" (Shelby, Smith)	1992	3rd Avenue	Let's Talk About Love	SOLAR / Epic
"Show Me" (Carmenatti)	1992	3rd Avenue	Let's Talk About Love	SOLAR / Epic
"Love Me Just A Little Bit More" (Carmenatti, Nelson)	1992	3rd Avenue	Let's Talk About Love	SOLAR / Epic
"One Kiss" (Nelson)	1992	3rd Avenue	Let's Talk About Love	SOLAR / Epic
"Imagination" (Carmenatti)	1993	The Deele	An Invitation To Love	SOLAR
"Feel It" (Carmenatti)	1993	The Deele	An Invitation To Love	SOLAR
"Rewind The Tape" (Carmenatti)	1993	The Deele	An Invitation To Love	SOLAR
"You're So Good To Me" (Smith, Thomas)	1995	The Whispers	Toast To The Ladies	Capitol

== See also ==
- List of record labels
