= Howard Hewett =

American singer–songwriter (born 1955)

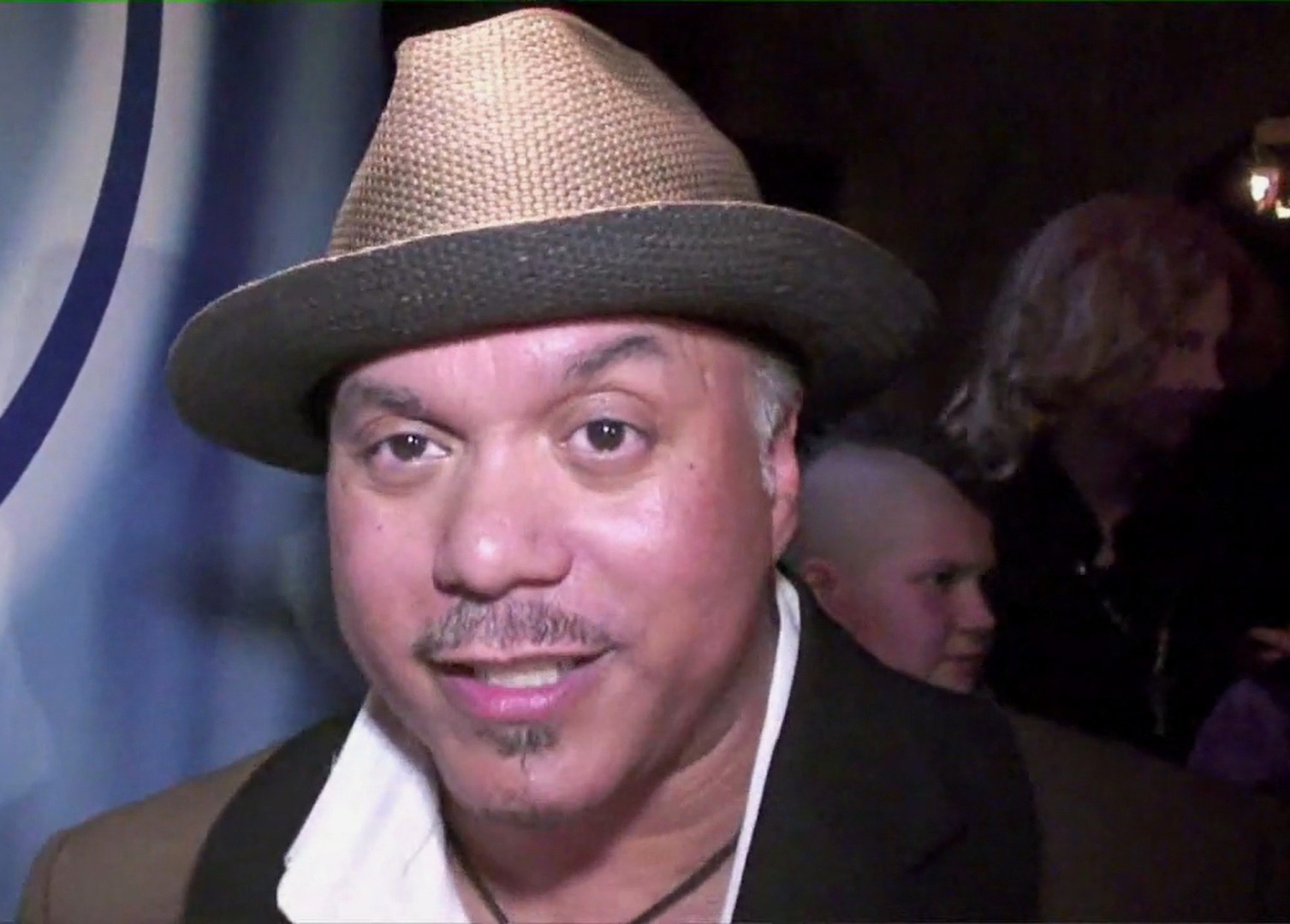
- Hewett in 2008

Background information
- Born: Howard Hewett Jr. October 1, 1955 (age 71); Akron, Ohio, U.S.
- Origin: Los Angeles, California, U.S.
- Genres: R&B; soul; gospel; jazz
- Occupation: Singer–songwriter
- Instruments: Vocals; piano; guitar
- Years active: 1977–present
- Website: howardhewettmusic.com

Howard Hewett Jr. (born October 1, 1955) is an American singer–songwriter. Hewett rose to fame as the lead vocalist of the group Shalamar. In 1985, he left the group to pursue his solo career, but he later returned to the group in 2001. He signed with Elektra Records. In 1986, he released his debut solo album I Commit to Love. Hewett and his group Shalamar contributed material to the Beverly Hills Cop soundtrack. The soundtrack won a Grammy Award for Best Score Soundtrack for Visual Media in 1986.

== Biography ==
Raised in Akron, Ohio, Hewett moved to Los Angeles in 1976, where he first met Jeffrey Daniel and Jody Watley at a club in the LA Crenshaw district. Hewett formed a show group called "Beverly Hills" and toured throughout Europe, the UK, Scandinavia and Asia for all of 1977 till the middle of 1978. After returning from overseas, Hewett started recording for Jeffrey Bowen.

In 1978, he got a call from Jeffrey Daniel who was in need of a lead singer and Hewett accepted the offer. Within three days Hewett flew to New Jersey, where he met up with Watley and Daniel and started recording the Big Fun LP with their producer, Leon Sylvers. The trio went on to record songs such as "Second Time Around", "Make That Move", "A Night to Remember", "Dancing in the Sheets" and the ballad "This Is for the Lover in You". Hewett was the group's lead singer from 1979 until 1985.

When Shalamar broke up in the mid-1980s, Hewett went on to a solid solo career. However, in 1985 before signing his solo deal with Elektra Records, he was arrested and indicted in Miami with his fiancée Mori Molina for possession with an intent to distribute cocaine. Molina, who was indicted in Tampa as well as Miami, was convicted and served prison time; but after a four-day trial, in which Molina testified that Hewett had nothing to do with the crime, Hewett was acquitted of all charges. In spite of his legal battles, Hewett signed his solo deal with Elektra Records and in 1986, before the Miami trial, released his first solo album I Commit to Love (R&B number 12), a solid urban album that yielded two top 10 R&B hits, "I’m for Real" (R&B number 2) and "Stay" (R&B number 8).

In 1988, he released his second album Forever and Ever, which featured the hits "Strange Relationship" (R&B number 9, and "Once, Twice, Three Times" (R&B number 15).

In 1990, Hewett released his self-titled album, Howard Hewett, which included the hit "Show Me" (R&B number 2), and "If I Could Only Have That Day Back" (R&B number 14) and the hit Shadow. 1992 saw the release of his 4th album Allegiance, which was not received as well as his previous albums. He contributed to the second season theme song of Hangin' with Mr. Cooper, which was a remake of Sam & Dave's R&B Top 10 hit "Soul Man". This recording was produced by singer Steve Tyrell. In 1994, Howard Hewett recorded "Christmas Will Return" with Brenda Russell for the Disney holiday film The Santa Clause. After 1995's It's Time (released by Caliber Records in the US and Expansion Records in the UK), Hewett spent much of his time providing guest vocals on albums by jazz artists such as Joe Sample, Brian Culbertson, and George Duke, among others. In 2000, The Rippingtons featured Hewett on "I Found Heaven" on their Life in the Tropics album. In 2001, Hewett recorded his first full gospel album, The Journey, followed a year later by The Journey Live: From the Heart.

In October 2006, Hewett released a new single, "Enough" (with jazz musician George Duke), which received substantial play on urban contemporary and R&B radio stations. Hewett is signed to The Groove Records, an independent label based in Los Angeles. In October 2008, Hewett released his Christmas CD, Howard Hewett Christmas.

== Personal life ==
Howard Hewett has been married four times. He and his first wife, Rainey Riley-Cunningham, had two daughters, LaKiva Siani and Rainey Daze; the two divorced in 1983. Hewett and Mari Molina married in 1986; the year of their divorce is unknown. Hewett and actress/singer Nia Peeples married in 1989 and had a son, Christopher Eugene Howard Hewett in June that same year; Peeples appeared in the music video for his song "Show Me." After their divorce in 1993, Hewett married Angela Bloom-Hewett and had one daughter, Anissa; they divorced in 2012. Howard also has three grandchildren. His son welcomed a boy, Robert Eugene (Bobby Gene) Callans on February 7, 2022. Hewett lives in Santa Clarita, California.

According to a DNA analysis, Hewett is descended from the people of Guinea Bissau and of the Limba of Sierra Leone.

== Discography ==
Studio albums

- I Commit to Love (1986)
- Forever and Ever (1988)
- Howard Hewett (1990)
- Allegiance (1992)
- It's Time (1994)
- The Journey (2001)
- If Only (2007)

== Filmography ==
- B*A*P*S (1997) – himself
- Dolemite (1975) – singer
- Family Time (2018) - Episode 10, Season 6, "Doctor Dad"
