= New Horizons (The Sylvers album) =

Studio album by the Sylvers
- Released: November 1977
- Recorded: 1976–1977
- Genre: Soul, disco
- Label: Capitol
- Producer: The Sylvers

The Sylvers chronology
Something Special (1976)	New Horizons (1977)	Forever Yours (1978)

New Horizons is the sixth album by the Los Angeles, California-based R&B group the Sylvers.

== Reception ==
Professional ratings
Review scores
Source	Rating
Allmusic	2.5/5 stars

Released in November 1977, this would be their third and final studio album for Capitol Records.

Two singles from the set were released: "Any Way You Want Me" and "New Horizons".

On July 23, 2012, New Horizons was released on a double-album CD along with their first Capitol record, Showcase.

== Track listing ==
1. "New Horizons" (Leon Sylvers III, Ricky Sylvers)
2. "Dressed to Kill" (Leon Sylvers III, Ricky Sylvers)
3. "Lovin' Me Back" (Leon Sylvers III, Patricia Sylvers)
4. "The Party Maker" (Leon Sylvers III, Foster Sylvers, Ricky Sylvers, James Sylvers, Edmund Sylvers)
5. "Take a Hand" (Leon Sylvers III, Foster Sylvers)
6. "Any Way You Want Me" (Leon Sylvers III, Edmund Sylvers)
7. "Another Day to Love" (Leon Sylvers III, John McClain)
8. "You Bring the Sunshine (Back Into My Life)" (Leon Sylvers III, Angie Sylvers)
9. "Charisma" (Leon Sylvers III)
10. "Star Fire" (Leon Sylvers III, Ricky Sylvers, Patricia Sylvers, James Sylvers)

== Personnel ==
- Leon Sylvers III – bass
- Ed Greene, Steve Gadd – drums
- John Burnes, Sonny Burke – electric piano
- Herman Brown, Jay Graydon, John McClain, Ricky Sylvers – guitar
- Victor Feldman – percussion, vibraphone, electric piano
- Richard Tee – piano
- Jim Horn, Tom Scott – saxophone
- James Sylvers, Jim Hughart – synthesizer
- Chuck Findley, Dick "Slyde" Hyde – trombone
- Gene Goe, Ollie Mitchell – trumpet

== Production ==
- Shusei Nagaoka - cover art

== Charts ==
Chart (1977)	Peak position
Billboard Pop Albums	134
Billboard Top Soul Albums	43

=== Singles ===
Year	Single	Chart positions	
Year	Single	US	US R&B
1977	Any Way You Want Me"	72	12
1978	"New Horizons"	—	45

== Samples ==
- "New Horizons"
  - "Hot 4 U"" by A Tribe Called Quest on their The Love Movement album
