= Forever Yours (The Sylvers album) =

Studio album by the Sylvers
- Released: August 31, 1978
- Recorded: 1977–1978
- Studios: Capitol, Hollywood, California
- Genres: Soul, disco
- Label: Casablanca
- Producer: Leon Sylvers III

The Sylvers chronology
New Horizons (1977)	Forever Yours (1978)	Disco Fever (1979)

Professional ratings
Review scores
Source	Rating
AllMusic	3/5 stars
The Virgin Encyclopedia of R&B and Soul	2/5 stars

Forever Yours is an album by the Los Angeles, California-based R&B group the Sylvers. Originally recorded when the Sylvers were still signed to Capitol Records, big brother Leon took over on production. Capitol did not like the new sound and rejected the album and dropped them. The Sylvers shopped the material elsewhere and by mid-1978 had signed with Casablanca Records. This would be their most critically acclaimed album, it would also be the last album Leon would be involved with for the family until 1981's album Concept as he would leave to become in-house producer for Dick Griffey's SOLAR Records. Two singles were released. "Don't Stop, Get Off" charted in late 1978 at number 15 on the US R&B charts. "Forever Yours" was the second single released in 1979 and didn't chart at all due to management shake-ups at Casablanca, even though it was sent to both pop and R&B radio stations.

== Track listing ==
1. "Don't Stop, Get Off" (Edmund Sylvers, Foster Sylvers, James Sylvers, Leon Sylvers III, Joseph Sylvers) – 3:08
2. "Love Changes" (Leon Sylvers III) – 2:43
3. "Forever Yours" (Leon Sylvers III, Edmund Sylvers) – 3:48
4. "Swept for You Baby" (Smokey Robinson) – 3:25
5. "Play This One Last Record" (Leon Sylvers III, Edmund Sylvers, Patricia L. Sylvers) – 4:31
6. "Come Dance with Me" (James Sylvers) – 3:12
7. "Come On Down to My House" (James Sylvers, Leon Sylvers III) – 3:20
8. "Diamonds Are Rare" (Leon Sylvers III) – 2:56
9. "Love Wont Let Me Go" (Leon Sylvers III, Z. Perry) – 3:43
10. "Just a Little Bit Longer" (Leon Sylvers III, Gene Dozier) – 3:02

== Personnel ==
- The Sylvers – backing vocals
- Foster Sylvers, James Sylvers – bass
- Edward Greene, John Guerin, Steve Gadd – drums
- Herman Brown, Jay Graydon, Mitchell L. Holder, Ricky Sylvers, Robben Ford, Tim May – guitar
- H. Grusin, James Sylvers, Patricia Sylvers, Richard Tee, Reginald Burke, Sylvester L. Rivers, Jr. – keyboards
- Gary L. Coleman, Victor Feldman – percussion
- Don Menza, Ernie Watts, Jim Horn, Pete Christlieb, Terry Harrington – reeds
- Michael Boddicker – synthesizer
- Chuck Findley – trumpet, trombone
- Dick Hyde – trombone
- Gene A. Goe, Oliver Mitchell, Oscar Brashear – trumpet
- James R. Horn, Dennis Quitman, Tom Scott – woodwind

== Charts ==
Chart (1978)	Peak position
Billboard Top Pop Albums	132
Billboard Top Soul Albums	40

=== Singles ===
Year	Single	Chart positions
Year	Single	US R&B
1977	"Don't Stop, Get Off"	15
