= Louie (album) =

Studio album by Kenny Beats
- Released: August 31, 2022
- Recorded: December 2021
- Studios: Bath, Somerset, England
- Genres: G-funk; instrumental hip-hop
- Length: 32:54
- Label: XL
- Producer: Kenny Beats

Kenny Beats chronology
Unlocked 1.5 (with Denzel Curry) (2021)	Louie (2022)	Fathers (2026)

Louie is the debut solo studio album from American hip-hop producer Kenny Beats, released on August 31, 2022, by XL Recordings. The album was recorded in December 2021. CD and vinyl releases are set for January 27, 2023. The album is mostly instrumental, but features guest appearances from artists including Vince Staples, Slowthai, JPEGMafia, Thundercat, and Remi Wolf.

== Background ==
Per a press release, the album is "an almost entirely instrumental artist record that acts as a deeply personal tribute to [Beats]' ailing father" who had been diagnosed with pancreatic cancer. Beats first learned about his father's diagnosis in early 2021 while he was in Bath, Somerset, England producing Idles' 2021 album Crawler. After ruminating for most of the year, Beats assembled the entire album in December of that year. Beats said that he previously "didn't have anything to say" to make a solo album out of, but channeled his feelings from that time to make an album that "encapsulated the feeling of that one month", also described as "something dark turned into something beautiful." The album tributes Beats' father, a former radio DJ, by recreating the vibe of mixtapes that the elder Kenneth Blume had made throughout in the 1990s while his son was young. The album announcement was preceded by four song snippets all titled "Louie" which were uploaded to YouTube, and was announced along with the album's cover art and track list.

A large portion of the album is made up of voice clips of conversations between Beats and his father, assembled by Beats across 2021 leading up to the recording of the project, some from Beats' childhood in the 1990s and others in his adulthood. The album opens on a conversation between the two telling the story of how Beats received the nickname Louie, and the track "The Perch" has the elder Blume introducing a radio show on the namesake fictional station as part of one of his mixtapes. Beats originally intended the project only as a gift to his father, but after a positive reaction from his close friends he decided to share it publicly. Beats cited Aphex Twin, D'Angelo, and Björk as inspirations.

== Live ==
Beats performed three songs from the album for an episode of NPR Music's Tiny Desk Concert series on February 13, 2023. He played drums alongside keyboardist/saxophonist Leon Michels, bassist Nick Movshon, and guest vocalists JPEGMafia, Remi Wolf, and Nami.

== Style and reception ==
Louie ratings
Review scores
Source	Rating
Clash	8/10
Financial Times	4/5 stars
The Guardian	4/5 stars
The Line of Best Fit	8/10
Pitchfork	7.6/10

Stereogum's Tom Breihan calls the album "a mood-based work, a seamless half-hour that seems intended to function as a headphones album", with Beats' frequent collaborators who appear on the album acting as "basically textures within a whole; none of them really get spotlight moments." Referring to Beats' sample choices, The Guardian's Alexis Petridis wrote that "The vintage of the tracks Louie draws on often makes its contents sound a little like early 90s G-funk, albeit a ramshackle take on the Dr. Dre-pioneered genre." Petridis calls the guest musicians "largely looped and distorted, part of the overall wash of sound rather than spotlit star turns", and concludes by calling the album "Strange but hooky, sonically unified but constantly changing, possessed of an odd emotional pull", and with "a certain bravery involved in releasing something so personal to the general public: listening to Louie makes you glad Blume chose to."

Clash's James Mellen calls the album "a half-hour of seamless and coherent soul-tinted arrangements, beautifully chopped up and spliced together in classic Kenny Beats fashion. With nods to G-funk, jazz and psychedelia, it not only works as a stunning homage to Blume's father, but also proof that [Beats] is a producer who can do it all." Pitchfork's Brady Brickner-Wood notes that while the record is indebted to older instrumental hip-hop, such as "Moire" to Madlib's Shades of Blue and "Drop 10" to J Dilla's Donuts, Beats' "creations are idiosyncratic", including elements such as "a quirky, bouncy bassline, a crisp doubled snare, a custom-made saw synth"; the album is "stuffed with little treasures like this, subtle choices that feel like diamonds when you unearth them."

Glide Magazine's Ryan Dillon calls the album "filled to the brim with beautiful arrangements and flawlessly chopped samples, giving the album its vibrant personality." The album "sounds like it is soundtracking the best day ever" with "smoother cuts like the off-kilter "Moire" and the jazzy, soul-infused "Last Words" "guid[ing] you on a walk around the neighborhood" and "celebratory" "Hold My Head" and "the danceable bounce" of "So They Say" "sound like your casual stroll led you to an outdoor DJ set of rare drums and dance circles." The "kaleidoscope style of beat-making ... leaves no rhythm unturned and not a second wasted", and the bridges "add depth and vibrancy while Kenny Beats' unpredictable approach to his arrangements as a whole gives Louie a cinematic feel." The subtlety of the album, including "whispering keys and quick spurts of vocal samples" which "add texture but never seem out of place", are what "really matter", "adding just enough spice to keep the minimalistic tone of the album consistent while keeping your ears open for every last detail." Financial Times's Ludovic Hunter-Tilney writes that "samples of 1970s soul hits such as Foster Sylvers' "Misdemeanor" and crate-digging gems such as Shira Small's 1974 psychedelic song "Eternal Life" are set against relaxed beats and warm melodies", and that the album contains sampled vocals from children as well as a young Kenny Beats and his father. Hunter-Tilney calls the project a "mellow, small-scale version of the grand sampladelic canvases made by DJ Shadow" and "an expertly assembled collage of deep cuts and deep feelings."

=== Accolades ===
==== Awards and nominations ====
Louie awards and nominations
Organization	Award	Status	Ref.
Libera Awards	Best Hip-Hop/Rap Record	Won	
Libera Awards	Best Short-Form Video	Nominated	

==== Year-end lists ====
Louie on year-end lists
Publication	#	Ref.
Clash	53	
The Needle Drop	30	

== Track listing ==
Louie track listing
No.	Title	Length
1.	"Leonard"	1:20
2.	"Parenthesis"	2:11
3.	"Hold My Head"	1:46
4.	"So They Say"	1:25
5.	"Family Tree"	2:13
6.	"Hooper"	1:27
7.	"Still"	2:42
8.	"Moire"	1:50
9.	"Get Around"	2:39
10.	"Eternal"	2:04
11.	"Last Words"	1:49
12.	"Drop 10"	1:28
13.	"The Perch"	1:39
14.	"Really Really"	1:48
15.	"That Third Thing"	2:10
16.	"Rotten"	1:46
17.	"Hot Hand"	2:37
Total length:		32:54

=== Samples ===
- "Drop 10" contains samples from the 1973 Foster Sylvers song "Misdemeanor".

== Personnel ==
- Kenny Beats – producer, composer, engineer, performer
- Alex Tumay – mixing engineer
- Benny Sings – performer (1, 2, 4, 13)
- Nick Lee – performer (1, 4, 6, 10, 11, 13, 16)
- Oliver Johnson – performer (1, 17)
- Pink Siifu – performer (2, 3)
- Slowthai – performer (5)
- Cory Henry – performer (4, 6, 9, 10, 13, 15–17)
- Paris Texas – performer (6, 17)
- JPEGMafia – performer (7)
- Dijon Duenas – performer (9)
- Daryl Johns – performer (10, 17)
- Fousheé – performer (11)
- Remi Wolf – performer (11)
- Vince Staples – performer (11)
- Nami – performer (15, 16)
- Thundercat – performer (15)
- Josh Decosta – performer (16)
- Theo Halm – performer (16)
- Mac DeMarco – producer (5), engineer (16)
- Omar Apollo – producer (7)
- Homer Steinweiss – producer (11)
- Leon Michels – producer (11, 16)
- Paul Spring – producer (11)

== Charts ==
Chart performance for Louie
Chart (2023)	Peak position
Scottish Albums (Official Charts)	49
UK Independent Albums (Official Charts)	10
UK R&B Albums (Official Charts)	2
