= Foster Sylvers (1973 album) =

Studio album by Foster Sylvers
- Released: June 10, 1973
- Recorded: 1973
- Genre: Soul
- Labels: Pride; MGM
- Producers: Jerry Peters; Keg Johnson

Foster Sylvers chronology
Foster Sylvers (1973)	Foster Sylvers Featuring Pat & Angie Sylvers (1974)

Singles from Foster Sylvers
- 1. "Misdemeanor" Released: May 1973

Professional ratings
Review scores
Source	Rating
Allmusic	4/5 stars

Foster Sylvers is the debut album by Foster Sylvers from the R&B group The Sylvers. Released in 1973, it was produced by Jerry Peters and Keg Johnson.

== Track listing ==
1. "Misdemeanor" (Leon Sylvers III)
2. "Big Things Come in Small Packages" (Leon Sylvers III)
3. "I'm Your Puppet" (Dan Penn, Spooner Oldham)
4. "Mockingbird" (Charlie Foxx, Inez Foxx)
5. "I'll Get You In The End" (Leon Sylvers III)
6. "Hey Little Girl"
7. "Happy Face"
8. "Swooperman"
9. "More Love"
10. "Only My Love Is True"
11. "Lullabye / Uncle Albert"

== Charts ==
Chart (1973)	Peak position
US Top LPs (Billboard)	159
US Top Soul LPs (Billboard)	31

== Samples ==
- "Misdemeanor"
  - "It's Funky Enough" by The D.O.C. on his No One Can Do It Better album
  - "Tear The Roof Off" by Grandmaster Flash on his album Ba-Dop-Boom-Bang
  - "out of sight" by Run the Jewels on their album RTJ4
  - "That's Gangsta" by Shyne on his self-titled album Shyne
- "More Love"
  - "No Brain"" by Madvillain on their Madvillainy 2: The Madlib Remix album
