= Ride a Wild Horse =

Single by Dee Clark
- B-side: "Ride a Wild Horse" (Instrumental)
- Released: August 1975
- Genre: Disco
- Length: 2:45
- Label: Chelsea; 3025
- Songwriter(s): Kenny Nolan
- Producer(s): Kenny Nolan

Dee Clark singles chronology
| "Raindrops "73"" (July 1973) | "Ride a Wild Horse" (1975) |

"Ride a Wild Horse" is a song written by Kenny Nolan and performed by Dee Clark. In 1975, the track reached No. 16 on the UK Singles Chart.

== Other Versions ==
- The Sex-O-Lettes released a version of the song as a single in 1976 which reached No. 27 on the U.S. dance chart and No. 106 on the U.S. pop chart.
