= Boogie Fever =

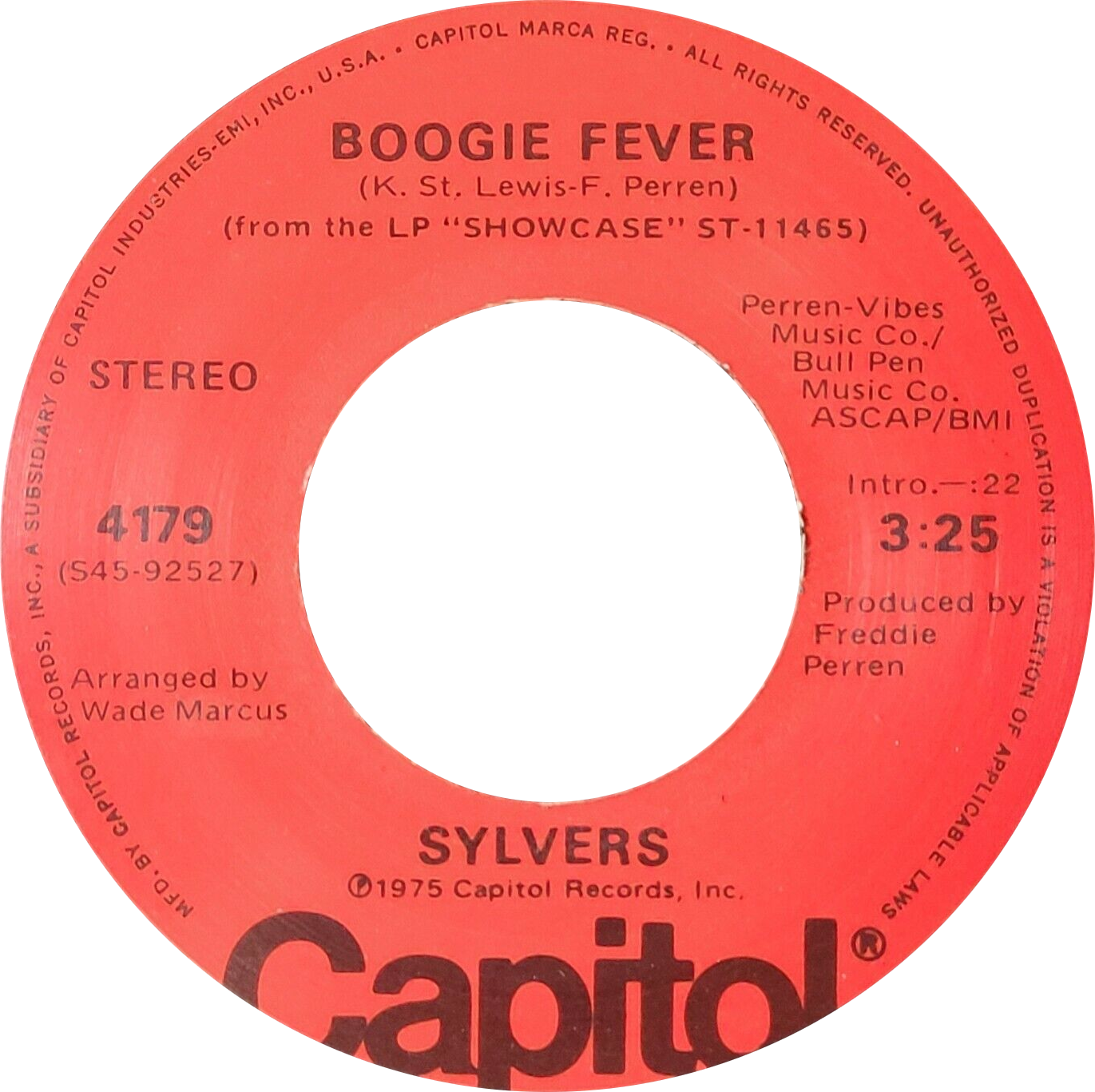
- One of side-A labels of the US single

Single by the Sylvers

from the album Showcase
- B-side: "Free Style"
- Released: November 1975
- Recorded: 1975
- Genre: Disco; pop-soul; bubblegum pop
- Length: 3:31
- Label: Capitol
- Songwriters: Freddie Perren, Kenneth St. Lewis
- Producer: Freddie Perren

The Sylvers singles chronology
"Stay Away From Me" (1973)	"Boogie Fever" (1975)	"Cotton Candy" (1976)

"Boogie Fever" is a song recorded by Los Angeles, California-based R&B group the Sylvers, from their 1975 album Showcase. Their most lucrative single, it reached No. 1 in the US on both the Billboard Hot 100 and Hot Soul Singles charts as well as reaching No. 1 in Canada on the RPM national singles chart in 1976. It was their third of nine Top 20 R&B hits and first top 40 pop single. Billboard ranked it as the No. 20 song for 1976. "Boogie Fever" is one of two gold records by the Sylvers, the other being "Hot Line".

== Content ==
The narrator of the song notes a change that seems to have come over his girlfriend. At the drive-in movie, she turns down the speaker volume and turns up the radio to hear her favorite disco songs. Then, at the pizza parlor, she "boogies" to the disco beat while eating her meal. He concludes that his girl must have caught the "boogie fever" which seems to be "goin' around". In the final verse, he consults his doctor and realizes that he himself has caught the "boogie fever" as a result of dancing all night, "doin' the bump, bump, bump" with his girlfriend.

== History ==
After being signed to Capitol Records in 1975, Larkin Arnold, then vice president, hired Motown Records veteran Freddie Perren to produce the group. Kenneth St. Lewis, a long-time collaborator with Arnold, suggested that they write a song for them using one of the popular words of the day, "boogie". The song featured all nine of the Sylvers siblings, including the youngest sisters Angelia and Pat. The lead vocal was by Edmund Sylvers; Foster Sylvers was prominently featured in the bridge singing the line: "We kept it going strong".

The bass line was performed by legendary Motown bassist James Jamerson, and the opening guitar riff was based upon that of "Day Tripper" by the Beatles.

The song was featured in the Stephen King miniseries The Stand (1994) and the feature film Roll Bounce (2005). In 2010, "Boogie Fever" was briefly used in a scene in Despicable Me, and in 2012 it was used in its theme park attraction adaptation, Despicable Me Minion Mayhem. The song has also appeared in TV ads for Intel Pentium II, Old Navy and Little Caesars Pizza. An instrumental version was also music for level 1 and level 9 of the game Frantic Freddie.

== Charts ==
=== Weekly singles charts ===
Chart (1976)	Peak position
Australia (Kent Music Report)	7
Canadian RPM Top Singles	1
New Zealand Singles Chart	4
US Billboard Hot 100	1
US Billboard Hot Soul Singles	1

=== Year-end charts ===
Chart (1976)	Rank
Australia (Kent Music Report)	42
Canada	32
New Zealand	10
US Billboard Hot 100	20

=== All-time charts ===
Chart (1958-2018)	Position
US Billboard Hot 100	585
