= Billboard year-end top 50 R&B singles of 1959 =

Billboard Top R&B Records of 1959 is the year-end chart compiled by Billboard magazine ranking the top rhythm and blues singles of 1959. Due to the extent of cross-over between the R&B and pop charts in 1959, the song's rank, if any, in the year-end pop chart is also provided.

R&B rank	Pop rank	Title	Artist(s)	Label
1	13	"Stagger Lee"	Lloyd Price	ABC-Paramount
2	27	"It's Just a Matter of Time"	Brook Benton	Mercury
3	9	"Kansas City"	Wilbert Harrison	Fury
4	56	"Lonely Teardrops"	Jackie Wilson	Brunswick
5	3	"Personality"	Lloyd Price	ABC-Paramount
6	63	"I Cried a Tear"	LaVern Baker	Atlantic
7	NR	"Try Me (I Need You)"	James Brown & The Famous Flames	Federal
8	29	"There Goes My Baby"	The Drifters	Atlantic
9	50	"What'd I Say"	Ray Charles	Atlantic
10	NR	"Thank You Pretty Baby"	Brook Benton	Mercury
11	NR	"There Is Something on Your Mind"	Big Jay McNeely	Swingin'
12	91	"You're So Fine"	The Falcons	Unart
13	NR	"I Loves You, Porgy"	Nina Simone	Bethlehem
14	69	"So Fine"	The Fiestas	Old Town
15	NR	"(Night Time Is) The Right Time"	Ray Charles	Atlantic
16	23	"I'm Gonna Get Married"	Lloyd Price	ABC-Paramount
17	17	"Charlie Brown"	The Coasters	Atco
18	16	"Smoke Gets in Your Eyes"	The Platters	Mercury
19	54	"Poison Ivy"	The Coasters	Atco
20	26	"16 Candles"	The Crests	Coed
21	68	"I Want to Walk You Home"	Fats Domino	Imperial
22	90	"That's Why (I Love You So)"	Jackie Wilson	Brunswick
23	1	"The Battle of New Orleans"	Johnny Horton	Columbia
24	NR	"Nobody but You"	Dee Clark	Abner
25	NR	"Pretty Girls Everywhere"	Eugene Church	Class
26	72	"A Lover's Question"	Clyde McPhatter	Atlantic
27	NR	"Everybody Likes to Cha Cha Cha"	Sam Cooke	Keen
28	21	"Sea of Love"	Phil Phillips	Mercury
29	45	"What A Difference a Day Makes"	Dinah Washington	Mercury
30	73	"I Only Have Eyes for You"	The Flamingos	End
31	87	"Endlessly"	Brook Benton	Mercury
32	31	"Red River Rock"	Johnny and the Hurricanes	Warwick
33	6	"Dream Lover"	Bobby Darin	Atco
34	NR	"I Waited Too Long"	LaVern Baker	Atlantic
35	NR	"Say Man"	Bo Diddley	Checker
36	5	"Lonely Boy"	Paul Anka	ABC-Paramount
37	NR	"Almost Grown"	Chuck Berry	Chess
38	11	"Sleep Walk"	Santo & Johnny	Canadian-American
39	NR	So Close"	Brook Benton	Mercury
40	NR	"Hey Little Girl (Dee Clark song)"	Dee Clark	Abner
41	NR	"I'll Be Satisfied"	Jackie Wilson	Brunswick
42	NR	"You Better Know It"	Jackie Wilson	Brunswick
43	NR	"Come to Me"	Marv Johnson	United Artist
44	NR	"Teardrops on Your Letter"	Hank Ballard and The Midnighters	King
45	65	"Since I Don't Have You"	The Skyliners	Calico
46	43	"Don't You Know?"	Della Reese	RCA Victor
46	22	"The Happy Organ"	Dave "Baby" Cortez	Clock
48	51	"Broken Hearted Melody"	Sarah Vaughan	Mercury
49	NR	"Where Were You on our Wedding Day"	Lloyd Price	ABC-Paramount
50	NR	"I'm Ready"	Fats Domino	Imperial

== See also ==
- List of Hot R&B Sides number ones of 1959
- Billboard Year-End Hot 100 singles of 1959
- 1959 in music
