= Something Special (The Sylvers album) =

Studio album by the Sylvers
- Released: November 9, 1976
- Recorded: 1975–1976
- Studio: Total Experience Recording Studios (Hollywood, California); United Western Studios (Hollywood, California)
- Genre: Soul, disco
- Label: Capitol
- Producer: Freddie Perren

The Sylvers chronology
Showcase (1975)	Something Special (1976)	New Horizons (1977)

Something Special is the fifth album by the Los Angeles, California-based R&B group the Sylvers.

== Reception ==
Professional ratings
Review scores
Source	Rating
Allmusic	3/5 stars

Released in November, 1976, this was the family's second album for Capitol Records, and their fifth album overall. Produced by Freddie Perren, "Something Special" would be the last album in which the Sylvers would team with the veteran producer.

Two singles were released from this set: "Hot Line" peaked at #5, and "High School Dance" peaked at #17.

== Track listing ==
- All songs written by Freddie Perren and Kenneth St. Lewis, except where noted.
1. "Hot Line" (4:32)
2. "Got to Have You (For My Very Own)" (Leon Sylvers III, Ricky Sylvers) (4:16)
3. "Now I Want You" (2:46)
4. "Ain't No Doubt About It" (3:55)
5. "Shake 'Um Up" (2:59)
6. "Mista Guitar Man" (5:00)
7. "Lovin' You Is Like Lovin' the Wind" (3:12)
8. "High School Dance" (Edmund Sylvers, James Sylvers, Leon Sylvers III, Ricky Sylvers) (3:49)
9. "That's What Love Is Made Of" (Leon Sylvers III) (3:19)
10. "Disco Showdown" (Leon Sylvers III, James Sylvers) (2:53)

== Personnel ==
- Freddie Perren – producer, writer
- Larkin Arnold – executive producer
- Kenneth St. Lewis – writer
- Chuck Rainey – bass guitar
- Leon Sylvers III – bass guitar, writer
- Scott Edwards – bass guitar
- James Gadson – drums
- Mike Brown – drums
- Robert Bowles – guitar
- Frank Wire – guitar
- Ricky Sylvers – guitar, writer
- Greg Bryant – keyboards
- John Barnes – keyboards
- Sylvester Rivers – keyboards
- Bob Zimitti – percussion
- Bradie Speller – percussion
- Larry Miles – recording engineer, mixing
- George Blair – assistant engineer
- George Belle – assistant engineer
- Roy Kohara – art direction
- Raul Vega – photography

== Charts ==
Chart (1976–1977)	Peak position
Australia (Kent Music Report)	65
Billboard Pop Albums	80
Billboard Top Soul Albums	13

=== Singles ===
Year	Single	Chart positions		
Year	Single	US	US R&B	AUS
1976	"Hot Line"	5	3	26
1977	"High School Dance"	17	6	-
