= High School Dance =

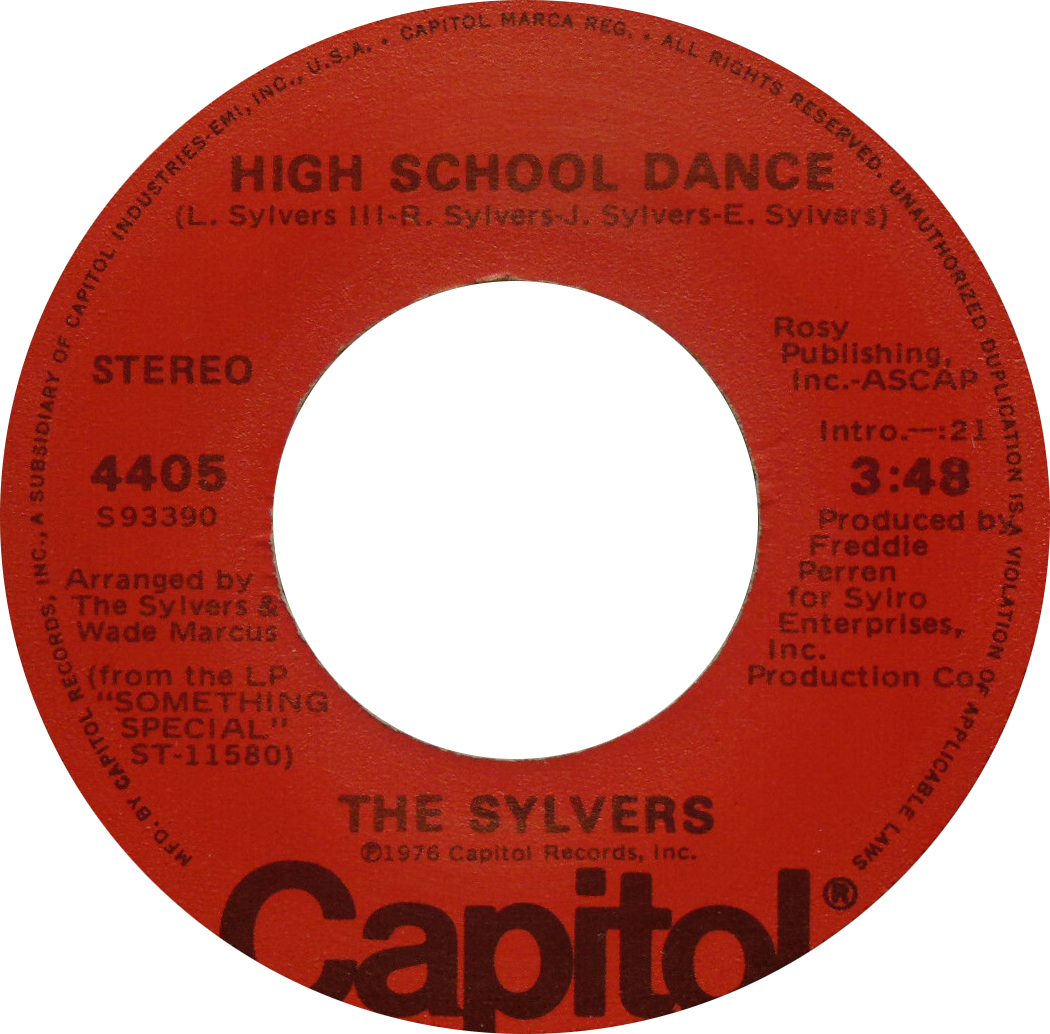
- One of side-A labels of the US single

Single by the Sylvers

from the album Something Special
- B-side: "Lovin' You Is Like Lovin' the Wind"
- Released: April 1977
- Recorded: 1976
- Genre: Soul, Disco
- Label: Capitol Records
- Songwriters: Leon Sylvers III, Edmund Sylvers, James Sylvers, Ricky Sylvers
- Producer: Freddie Perren

The Sylvers singles chronology
"Hot Line" (1976)	"High School Dance" (1977)	"Any Way You Want Me" (1977)

"High School Dance" is a song recorded by American family group the Sylvers from their 1976 album Something Special. Written by members of the Sylvers, it charted in 1977 at number 17 on the Pop charts and number 6 on the R&B charts.

== Chart performance ==
=== Weekly singles charts ===
Chart (1977)	Peak position
U.S. Billboard Hot 100	17
U.S. Cash Box Top 100	13
U.S. Billboard Hot Soul Singles	6
Canada	8
New Zealand	18

=== Year-end charts ===
Chart (1977)	Position
U.S. Billboard Hot 100	84
U.S. Cash Box	89
Canada	88
