= Dick Hyde (musician) =

American trombonist (1936–2019)

Dick "Slyde" Hyde
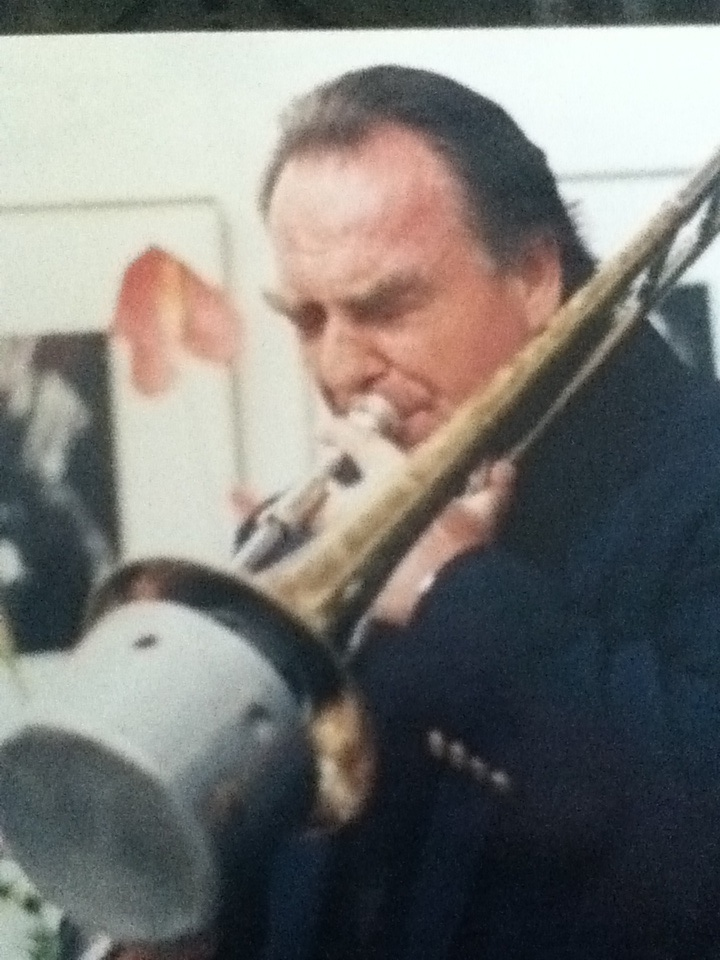
- Hyde in 2014

Background information
- Born: Richard John Hyde; July 4, 1936; Lansing, Michigan, U.S.
- Died: July 15, 2019 (aged 83)
- Genres: Jazz, rock, pop
- Occupation: Musician
- Instruments: Trombone, brass, woodwinds
- Years active: 1953–2019

Richard John Hyde (July 4, 1936 – July 15, 2019), sometimes credited as Slyde Hyde, was an American trombonist who played several brass and woodwind instruments. He was a member of the National Academy of Recording Arts and Sciences (NARAS) Hall of Fame. He worked as a session musician and sideman for Count Basie, Herbie Hancock, Frank Sinatra, Jaco Pastorius, Steely Dan, Earth, Wind & Fire, The Beach Boys, Tom Waits, Supertramp, Temptations, Boz Scaggs, Ringo Starr, Carole King, Madonna, and Donna Summer.

== Life and career ==
Richard John Hyde was born in Lansing, the capital of the U.S. state of Michigan, on 4 July, 1936. He began his trombone studies in fourth grade when he was living in Bluffton, Indiana and later in Los Angeles, California. He lived (in 2013) with his wife Yolanda (Yolee) of 42 years in Hawi, Hawaii. Hyde continued his studies first at the Los Angeles City College and then at the Navy School of Music, which at the time was located at the Naval Receiving Station of Anacostia, on the Anacostia River in Maryland. He served and toured with the United States Navy Band, based at the historic Washington Navy Yard in Washington, D.C., where he met saxophonist Jay Migliori, who helped him to take the first steps towards his professional career.

Hyde made his recording debut on the 1960 big band vocal album, Two Much!, with Ann Richards singing backed by Stan Kenton and his Orchestra. Since then he has toured and recorded hundreds of albums with rock, pop, and jazz artists, including Ralph Marterie, Count Basie, Woody Herman, Harry James (1960–1961), Roger Wagner Orchestra and Chorale (1966), Carole King (1973), Jaco Pastorius (1982–1983), Frank Sinatra (1987–1989). He has recorded with jazz big bands and artists such as Henry Mancini, Bill Conti, Allyn Ferguson, Johnny Mandel, Freddie Hubbard, Herbie Hancock, Thelma Houston, Cannonball Adderley, Tom Scott, folk artists like Rita Coolidge and Kris Kristofferson, and popular music acts such as Neil Diamond, Donna Summer, The Pointer Sisters, The Beach Boys, Helen Reddy, Earth, Wind & Fire, Steely Dan, Supertramp, Madonna among many others.

Recipient of four NARAS MVP awards in 1974, 1984, 1986, and 1988 respectively, and MVP Emeritus, his style is strongly influenced by American trombonists J. J. Johnson and Carl Fontana.

Hyde died on July 15, 2019, at the age of 83.

== Awards ==
Hyde was a four-time NARAS (National Academy of Recording Arts and Sciences, also known as The Recording Academy) MVP (Most Valuable Player) winner and MVP Emeritus in the NARAS Hall of Fame. He won the award for Best Trombone Player in 1974, for Best Tuba Player in 1984, for Best Bass Trombone Player in 1986, and for Best Double Brassist Player in 1988.

== Discography ==
=== Studio albums ===
Year	Album	Artist	Genre	Label	Credit	Ref.
1960	Two Much!	Ann Richards and Stan Kenton and His Orchestra	Jazz, pop	Capitol	Trombone	
1966	Sugar	Nancy Sinatra	Jazz, rock, pop	Reprise	Trombone	
1967	Yellow Underground	Ian Whitcomb	Rock	Tower	Trombone, tuba	
1967	Feelin' Groovy Reissued in 2011 with bonus tracks	Harpers Bizarre	Rock, pop	Warner Bros. (1967), Now Sounds (2011)	Trombone	
1968	Song Cycle	Van Dyke Parks	Pop, rock	Warner Bros.	Woodwind	
1968	The Mason Williams Phonograph Record	Mason Williams	Rock	Warner Bros.	Trombone	
1969	Fused	The Mike Post Coalition	Jazz, rock, funk, soul, folk, world, country	Warner Bros.	Trombone	
1969	Jung!: The Big Band Syndrome	Bob Jung and His Orchestra	Jazz	Command	Trombone	
1969	Inside Bugsy	Bugsy	Pop, rock	Dot	Trombone	
1969	Collision in Black	Blue Mitchell	Funk, soul, jazz	Blue Note	Trombone	
1970	Earth Rot	David Axelrod	Jazz, rock	Capitol	Trombone	
1970	Tap Root Manuscript	Neil Diamond	Rock	Uni	Trombone	
1971	Rita Coolidge	Rita Coolidge	Blues, folk, world, country, rock	A&M	Trombone	
1970	Blood, Chet and Tears	Chet Baker	Jazz	Verve	Trombone	
1971	Reflections in a Mud Puddle	Dory Previn	Folk, world, country	United Artists	Trombone	
1972	Music from the TV Series: The Mancini Generation	Henry Mancini and His Orchestra	Jazz, soundtrack	RCA Victor	Horn	
1972	The Auction	David Axelrod	Jazz, funk, soul	Decca	Trombone	
1973	Last of the Brooklyn Cowboys	Arlo Guthrie	Folk, rock	Reprise	Horn on "Gypsy Davy"	
1973	Los Cochinos	Cheech & Chong	Comedy, rock	Ode	Horn	
1973	Phew	Claudia Lennear	Funk, soul, rock	Warner Bros.	Trombone	
1973	Seeds	Barry McGuire	Folk, world, country, rock	Myrrh Gold	Trombone	
1973	His California Album	Bobby Blue Bland	Blues, funk, soul	Dunhill	Horn	
1973	Living Together, Growing Together	The 5th Dimension	Funk, soul	Bell	Trombone	
1973	Fantasy	Carole King	Jazz, pop, rock	Ode	Trombone	
1974	Spooky Lady's Sideshow	Kris Kristofferson	Country, rock	Monument	Trombone, tuba	
1974	Wrap Around Joy	Carole King	Folk, world, country, pop	Ode	Horn	
1974	Kinky Friedman	Kinky Friedman	Folk, world, country	ABC	Horn	
1974	Estate of Mind	Evie Sands	Funk, soul	Haven, Capitol	Horn	
1974	High Energy	Freddie Hubbard	Jazz	Columbia	Trombone on "Crisis"	
1974	Life Machine	Hoyt Axton	Folk, world, country, rock	A&M	Horn on "Life Machine", "Good Lookin' Child", and "Pet Parade"	
1974	Heavy Axe	David Axelrod	Funk, soul, jazz, rock	Fantasy	Trombone	
1974	Pratt-McClain	Pratt & McClain	Rock	Dunhill	Trombone	
1974	Pray for the Lion	Lenny Williams	Funk, soul	Warner Bros.	Horn, trombone	
1975	I'll Play for You	Seals and Crofts	Pop, rock	Warner Bros.	Trombone	
1975	Man-Child	Herbie Hancock	Jazz, funk	Columbia	Tuba, trombone	
1975	I've Got the Music in Me	Thelma Houston feat. Pressure Cooker	Jazz	Sheffield Lab	Trombone, flute	
1975	The Sons of Mrs. Righteous	The Righteous Brothers	Pop, rock	Haven, Capitol	Horn	
1975	Home Plate	Bonnie Raitt	Blues, folk, world, country	Warner Bros.	Trombone, trumpet, horn	
1975	Seriously Deep	David Axelrod	Electronic, jazz	Polydor	Trombone	
1975	Big Man: The Legend of John Henry 2 × LP	Cannonball Adderley	Funk, soul, jazz, soundtrack	Fantasy	Trombone	
1975	New York Connection	Tom Scott	Jazz	Ode	Trombone, trumpet	
1976	Silk Degrees	Boz Scaggs	Rock	Columbia	Horn	
1976	The Royal Scam	Steely Dan	Rock, Jazz	ABC	Trombone	
1976	White on White	Brian Cadd	Rock	Capitol	Horn	
1976	Tom Thumb the Dreamer	Michael Dinner	Rock, pop	Fantasy	Trombone	
1976	Help Is on the Way	Melissa Manchester	Funk, soul, jazz, pop	Arista	Horn on "So's My Old Man"	
1976	Rollin' Dice	Jimmy Jackson (soul artist)	Funk, soul	Buddah	Horn, trombone	
1976	Carmel by the Sea	The Jack Daugherty Orchestra	Jazz, funk	Monterey	Trombone	
1976	Forever Taurus	Johnny Hammond	Fusion, jazz, funk	Milestone	Trombone	
1976	The Pretender	Jackson Browne	Rock	Asylum	Horn on "Daddy's Tune"	
1977	Aja	Steely Dan	Jazz rock	ABC	Trombone	
1977	Mirriam	Jessi Colter	Blues, folk, world, country	Capitol	Trombone	
1977	Romantic Journey	Norman Connors	Funk, soul	Teldec	Trombone	
1977	Rare Gems Odyssey	Rare Gems Odyssey	Funk, soul	Casablanca	Trombone	
1977	Funk in a Mason Jar	Harvey Mason	Jazz, funk, soul	Arista	Trombone	
1977	Finger Paintings	Earl Klugh	Jazz, funk, soul	Blue Note	Horn	
1977	For the Cos of Jazz	First Cosins Jazz Ensemble	Funk, soul, jazz	Capitol	Trombone	
1977	The First in Line	Randy Sharp	Folk, world, country	Nautilus	Horn, woodwind	
1977	Rhapsody in Blue	Walter Murphy	Electronic, funk, soul, jazz	Private Stock	Trombone	
1977	There's Music in the Air	Letta Mbulu	Jazz, funk, soul	A&M	Horn	
1977	I'm Glad You're Here with Me Tonight	Neil Diamond	Rock	CBS	Reed	
1978	L.A.Express	L.A.Express & Goro Noguchi ロサンゼルス通信 & 野口五郎	Funk, soul, jazz	Polydor	Trombone	
1978	Frankie Valli... Is the Word	Frankie Valli	Rock, funk, soul, pop	Warner Bros., Curb	Trombone	
1978	Forever Yours	The Sylvers	Funk, soul	Casablanca	Trombone	
1978	Living Room Suite	Harry Chapin	Rock	Elektra	Trombone	
1978	Don't Cry Out Loud	Melissa Manchester	Funk, soul, pop	Arista	Trombone on "Bad Weather"	
1978	...In Your Eyes	Mary MacGregor	Pop, rock	Ariola	Trombone	
1978	Straight to the Bank	Bill Summers and Summers Heat	Funk, soul	Prestige	Trombone	
1978	Cheryl Lynn	Cheryl Lynn	Funk, soul	Columbia	Trombone	
1978	What Have You Done for Love?	James & Smith Hodges	Funk, soul, jazz, pop	London	Trombone	
1978	Trying to Get to You	Tan Tan	Jazz, rock	Invitation	Trombone	
1978	The Witness	Jimmy & Carol Owens	Pop	Light	Trombone	
1978	Jerry Corbetta	Jerry Corbetta	Funk, soul, rock	Warner Bros.	Horn	
1978	Dane Donohue	Dane Donohue	Rock	Columbia	Trombone	
1979	Breakfast in America	Supertramp	Rock	A&M	Tuba, trombone	
1979	Bad Girls	Donna Summer	Electronic, funk, soul	Casablanca	Trombone	
1979	Disco Fever	The Sylvers	Funk, soul	Casablanca	Trombone	
1979	J. Michael Reed	J. Michael Reed	Electronic, Funk, soul	Casablanca	Trombone, trumpet	
1979	Dancin' Is Makin' Love	Gap Mangione	Funk, soul, jazz	A&M	Trombone	
1979	Moonlight Madness	Teri DeSario	Funk, soul	Casablanca	Trombone	
1979	Disco Derby	Rhythm Heritage	Funk, soul	MCA	Trombone	
1979	Dance Forever	Cheryl Ladd	Funk, soul, pop	Capitol	Trombone	
1979	The Love Connection	Freddie Hubbard	Jazz	CBS	Trombone	
1979	Happy People	Paulinho da Costa	Funk, soul, jazz	Pablo Today	Trombone	
1979	Making a Name for Myself	Roger Miller	Folk, world, country	20th Century Fox	Trombone	
1979	Greg Smaha	Greg Smaha	Funk, soul	RCA	Trombone, trumpet	
1979	Discosymphony	Walter Murphy	Electronic, funk, soul, pop	New York International	Trombone	
1979	Words and Music Remastered in 2011	Alessi Brothers	Pop, rock	A&M	Trombone	
1979	September Morn	Neil Diamond	Pop, rock	CBS	Horn on "Stagger Lee"	
1980	Keepin' the Summer Alive	The Beach Boys	Rock	Caribou	Trombone	
1980	Marchin'	David Axelrod	Electronic, jazz, rock	MCA	Trombone	
1980	Emotion	Merry Clayton	Funk, soul	MCA	Trombone	
1980	Catherine McKinnon	Catherine McKinnon	Jazz, pop	Intercan	Trombone	
1980	Amy Holland	Amy Holland	Rock, pop	Capitol	Trombone	
1980	"You've Got It!"	Baby'O	Latin, funk, soul	Baby'O Music Enterprises	Trombone	
1980	Nielsen/Pearson	Nielsen/Pearson	Rock	Capitol	Horn	
1980	Priority	Imperials	Rock	DaySpring	Trombone	
1981	Swing	Swing	Jazz	Planet	Trombone	
1981	Bobby King	Bobby King	Funk, soul	Warner Bros.	Trombone	
1981	Raise!	Earth, Wind & Fire	Funk, soul	ARC, Columbia	Trombone	
1982	So Excited!	The Pointer Sisters	Electronic, hip hop, rock, funk, soul, pop	Planet	Trombone on "All of You" and "I Feel for You"	
1982	Desire	Tom Scott	Jazz	Elektra Musician	Trombone	
1982	Let Me Know You	Stanley Clarke	Funk, soul	Epic	Trombone on "You Are the One for Me", "The Force of Love", and "New York City"	
1982	Patty Weaver	Patty Weaver	Rock, pop	Warner Bros.	Trombone	
1982	Head to Toe	Kenny Nolan	Funk, soul, pop	MCA	Trombone	
1982	Direct Hit	Noel Pointer	Funk, soul	Liberty	Trombone	
1983	She Works Hard for the Money	Donna Summer	Electronic, pop	Casablanca	Horn	
1983	Swordfishtrombones	Tom Waits	Jazz, rock	Island	Trombone on "In the Neighborhood"	
1983	Victory	Larry Graham	Funk, soul	Warner Bros.	Horn on "Just Call My Name", "Don't Think Too Long", "I'm Sick and Tired", and "I'd Rather Be Loving You"	
1983	Target	Tom Scott	Jazz	Atlantic	Trombone, trumpet	
1983	Friends	Larry Carlton	Jazz	Warner Bros.	Trombone	
1983	Break Out Reissued in 1984 with a different track listing, and in 2011 in a 2 × CD deluxe remastered and expanded edition.	The Pointer Sisters	Electronic, funk, soul, hip hop	Planet (1983 and 1984), Big Break (2011)	Trombone on "I'm So Excited" (1984 album, and 7″ and 12″ single remix versions)	
1984	1100 Bel Air Place	Julio Iglesias	Pop	Columbia	Trombone	
1984	Good Times!	Lynn Carey	Jazz, pop	Big Blonde	Contrabass, cornet, trombone on "I'm Nobody's Baby but Mine"	
1986	Cocker	Joe Cocker	Rock	Capitol, Bertelsmann Club	Horn on "You Can Leave Your Hat On"	
1986	Come Share My Love	Miki Howard	Funk, soul, pop	Atlantic	Horn on "I Can't Wait (To See You Alone)"	
1987	Flamingo Orkestra featuring Cynthia Manley	Flamingo Orkestra featuring Cynthia Manley	Electronic, funk, soul	Voss	Horn	
1989	Like a Prayer	Madonna	Electronic	Sire	Brass	
1990	Pornograffitti	Extreme	Rock	A&M	Trombone on "Li'l Jack Horny"	
1991	Cuban Fire! 1991 CD release; tracks 8 to 12 recorded during the 'Mellophonium' sessions at Capitol Tower Studios, Los Angeles on September 19–21, 1960	Stan Kenton	Jazz	Capitol	Trombone on tracks 8 to 12	
1991	Pure Schuur	Diane Schuur	Jazz, pop	GRP	Trombone on "Deed I Do"	
1992	In Tribute	Diane Schuur	Jazz	GRP	Trombone	
1993	Duets	Frank Sinatra	Jazz	Capitol	Trombone	
1993	Requiem: The Holocaust	David Axelrod	Electronic, jazz	Liberty	Trombone on "Dies Irae" / "Gas Chambers"	
1994	The Monkees Present 1994 CD reissue	The Monkees	Rock	Rhino	Horn on "Ladies Aid Society"	
1994	Timepiece	Kenny Rogers	Pop	Atlantic	Trombone	
1995	My Road Our Road 1995 CD reissue	Lee Oskar	Jazz	Avenue	Horn on "Our Road"	
1997	In a Metal Mood: No More Mr. Nice Guy	Pat Boone	Jazz	Hip-O	Trombone	
1998	Sunrise 1998 remastered reissue	Paulinho da Costa	Jazz, funk, soul	Original Jazz Classics, Pablo	Trombone	
19xx	Vic Malo	Vic Malo	Funk, soul	Mataele	Trombone	

=== Live albums ===
Year	Album	Artist	Genre	Label	Credit	Ref.
1978	Live and More Universal Amphitheatre, 1978	Donna Summer	Funk, soul	Casablanca	Trombone	
1979	In Concert Pavillon de Paris, 1 and 2 December 1978	Cerrone	Electronic, funk, soul	Malligator	Trombone	

=== Compilation albums ===
Year	Album	Artist	Genre	Label	Credit	Ref.
1980	Greatest Science Fiction Hits II	Neil Norman & His Cosmic Orchestra	Electronic, funk, soul, jazz, rock	Festival, GNP Crescendo	Trombone	
1981	Les Grands thèmes de la Science-Fiction 2 × LP	Neil Norman & His Cosmic Orchestra	Electronic, funk, soul, jazz, rock	Disques Vogue	Trombone	
1986	The Hit Years	Nancy Sinatra	Pop, soundtrack	Rhino	Horn	
1993	The Donna Summer Anthology 2 × CD	Donna Summer	Jazz	PolyGram	Trombone	
1996	In My Lifetime 3 × CD	Neil Diamond	Rock, pop	Columbia	Trombone	
1997	Lovergirl: The Teena Marie Story	Teena Marie	Funk, soul	Epic, Legacy	Trombone	
1998	Greatest Hits	Joe Cocker	Rock	EMI Electrola	Trombone on "You Can Leave Your Hat On"	
2000	The Axelrod Chronicles	David Axelrod	Jazz, funk, soul	Fantasy	Trombone	
2004	Ultimate Collection	Joe Cocker	Rock	Hip-O, A&M	Horn on "You Can Leave Your Hat On"	
2004	Most Wanted 1968–1979	Lalo Schifrin	Jazz, funk, soul	Boutique	Trombone on "Dirty Harry"	
2005	Gold 2 × CD	Donna Summer	Electronic, pop	Hip-O	Brass, horn	
2005	Magic Hollow 4 × CD box set	The Beau Brummels	Rock	Rhino	Trombone on "Painter of Women", "It Won't Get Better", and "Triangle"	
2006	Milestones: Jazz Classics in a Funky Vibe	Various Artists	Electronic, jazz	BHM	Trombone on "Minority"	
2008	Frankie Valli Is the Word / Heaven Above Me a albums collectors' edition. Hyde appears on tracks 1–10: Frankie Valli Is the Word, originally released in 1978.	Frankie Valli	Rock, pop, soundtrack	Collectors' Choice Music	Trombone	
2008	Et Voilà ! Complete discography 22 × CD and 4 × DVD-V box set 1500 copies limited edition, reissued in 2010. Hyde appears on L'Olympia 1985 (CD 12).	Véronique Sanson	Pop	Warner Music France	Trombone on "Minority"	

=== Soundtracks ===
Year	Album	Artist	Genre	Label	Credit	Ref.
1982	One from the Heart	Tom Waits and Crystal Gayle	Jazz, rock, soundtrack	Warner Bros.	Trombone on "Circus Girl"	
2009	The Thief Who Came to Dinner (Original Motion Picture Soundtrack)	Henry Mancini	Jazz, folk, world, country, soundtrack	Film Score Monthly	Trombone	
