= Disco Fever (disambiguation) =

Disco Fever was a dance club in New York City.

Disco Fever may also refer to:

- Disco Fever (album), 1979 album by the Sylvers
- Disco Fever (film), 1978 American film directed by Lamar Card
- Disco Fever (pinball), a model of pinball machine manufactured by WMS Industries
- "Disco Fever" (Terry and June), a 1978 episode of Terry and June
- "Disco Fever", a 2012 song by Goat from World Music
