= Foster Sylvers Featuring Pat & Angie Sylvers =

Studio album by Foster Sylvers
- Released: November 18, 1974
- Recorded: 1974
- Genre: Soul
- Label: Pride/MGM
- Producer: Jerry Peters, Keg Johnson

Foster Sylvers chronology
Foster Sylvers (1973)	Foster Sylvers Featuring Pat & Angie Sylvers (1974)	Foster Sylvers (1978)

Foster Sylvers Featuring Pat & Angie Sylvers is the second album by Foster Sylvers from the R&B group The Sylvers, this time featuring older sisters Pat & Angie Sylvers. Released in 1974, it was produced by Jerry Peters and Keg Johnson.

Professional ratings
Review scores
Source	Rating
Allmusic	link

== Track listing ==
1. "Na Na Hey Hey Kiss Him Goodbye" – 3:59
2. "I Got You Babe" – 3:40
3. "Love Me Tender" – 3:05
4. "Apples, Peaches, Pumpkin Pie" – 2:25
5. "Hang On Sloopy" – 2:51
6. "Stubborn Kind of Fellow" – 3:13
7. "I Fall In Love Every Day" – 2:40
8. "1-2-3" – 3:00
9. "When I'm Near You" – 2:43
10. "Caress Me Pretty Music" – 3:20
11. "Montego Bay" – 2:38
