= Foster Sylvers (1978 album) =

Foster Sylvers (1978)

Studio album by Foster Sylvers
- Released: September 25, 1978
- Recorded: 1978 at Village Recorders, Los Angeles, CA
- Genre: Soul
- Label: Capitol
- Producer: The Sylvers, Al Ross, Bob Cullen

Foster Sylvers chronology
Foster Sylvers Featuring Pat & Angie Sylvers (1974)	Foster Sylvers (1978) (1978)	Plain and Simple (1987)

Foster Sylvers is the third album by Foster Sylvers from the R&B group The Sylvers. This is his second self-titled album. It was released in 1978 and produced by The Sylvers, Al Ross and Bob Cullen. The arrangements were by David Crawford and Jerry Peters; with the percussion arranged by Harvey Mason and King Errisson.

== Track listing ==
1. "Knocking At Your Door"
2. "Don't Let Me Go For Someone Else"
3. "Don't Be Cruel"
4. "Super Scoop"
5. "I'll See You in My Dreams"
6. "Goody Goody"
7. "Happy"
8. "The Drop"
9. "Sugarland"
10. "I'll Miss You"

== Personnel ==
- The Sylvers – backing vocals
- Leon Sylvers III – bass
- Ed Greene – drums
- Ricky Sylvers – guitar
- Sylvester Rivers – piano
- Richard Tee – piano, organ
- Victor Feldman – vibraphone, percussion
