= Rock Swings =

Studio album by Paul Anka
- Released: May 31, 2005
- Recorded: November 2004
- Studios: Capitol Studios (Los Angeles, California)
- Genre: Swing
- Length: 58:18
- Label: Verve Music Group
- Producers: Paul Anka; Alex Christensen

Paul Anka chronology
Times of Your Life (1975)	Rock Swings (2005)	Classic Songs, My Way (2007)

Professional ratings
Review scores
Source	Rating
Allmusic	3.5/5 stars
Rolling Stone	3/5 stars
BBC.co.uk	Negative

Rock Swings is an album by Paul Anka. Recorded in November 2004 and released on May 31, 2005, in Canada and June 7, 2005, in the United States, it contains swing jazz covers of popular rock and pop songs from the 1980s and 1990s.

The idea of an established vocalist giving rock hits a "standards" treatment was earlier realized by Anka's contemporary Pat Boone in the 1997 album, In a Metal Mood: No More Mr. Nice Guy, with Boone doing covers of songs by Alice Cooper, Van Halen and Judas Priest. That same year, Steve Lawrence and Eydie Gormé covered Soundgarden's "Black Hole Sun" in a lounge-jazz style on the 1997 compilation album release, Lounge-A-Palooza. Anka also covers "Black Hole Sun" on Rock Swings.

Reportedly, the Michael Jackson song "Billie Jean" was slated to be on the album in the recording stages, but Paul Anka could not get through a vocal take without bursting into laughter. The album features "It's My Life" by Bon Jovi, a song which includes the line "Like Frankie said, 'I did it my way'", a tongue-in-cheek reference to the Sinatra classic "My Way", the lyrics to which were written by Anka.

After the release of this album, Anka was awarded a star on Canada's Walk of Fame in Toronto. A DVD release of the same name, including live performances of these songs by Anka, was released on December 6, 2005.

== Charts ==
Debuted at:

- #120 on the Billboard 200
- #9 on the Official UK Album Chart
- #2 on Billboard's Top Jazz Albums chart
- #1 on Amazon.de

== Track listing ==
No.	Title	Writer(s)	Length
1.	"It's My Life"	Jon Bon Jovi, Richie Sambora, Max Martin	4:02
2.	"True"	Gary Kemp	4:30
3.	"Eye of the Tiger"	Jim Peterik, Frankie Sullivan	4:04
4.	"Everybody Hurts"	Michael Stipe, Peter Buck, Mike Mills, Bill Berry	4:14
5.	"Wonderwall"	Noel Gallagher	3:37
6.	"Black Hole Sun"	Chris Cornell	4:28
7.	"It's a Sin"	Neil Tennant, Chris Lowe	4:59
8.	"Jump"	David Lee Roth, Eddie Van Halen, Michael Anthony, Alex Van Halen	3:36
9.	"Smells Like Teen Spirit"	Kurt Cobain, Krist Novoselic, Dave Grohl	2:42
10.	"Hello"	Lionel Richie	5:14
11.	"Eyes Without a Face"	Billy Idol, Steve Stevens	3:59
12.	"Lovecats"	Robert Smith	3:58
13.	"The Way You Make Me Feel"	Michael Jackson	3:49
14.	"Tears in Heaven"	Eric Clapton, Will Jennings	5:01

== Certifications ==
Country	Certification	Sales/shipments
Canada	Gold	50,000

== Samples ==
Smells Like Teen Spirit
"Smells Like Teen Spirit" as covered by Paul Anka on his album, Rock Swings.

== Personnel ==
=== Production ===
- Paul Anka – executive producer
- Alex Christensen – producer
- Al Schmitt – engineer, mixing
- Steve Genewick – Pro Tools engineer
- Steffen Häfelinger – vocal editing
- Ralph Kessler – mastering
- Sascha Kramer – photography
- www.schilko.com – artwork

=== Musicians ===
- Paul Anka – vocals
- Randy Kerber – acoustic piano
- Mike Lang – acoustic piano
- Larry Koonse – guitars
- Dean Parks – guitars
- Mike Valerio – bass
- Vinnie Colaiuta – drums
- Luis Conte – percussion
- Emil Richards – vibraphone
- Dan Higgins – alto sax and flute solos (3, 5, 6)
- Jon Crosse – tenor sax solo (12)

=== Orchestra ===
- Patrick Williams – arrangements (1, 5, 8), conductor and leader
- Randy Kerber – arrangements (2–4, 6, 7, 10–14), conductor and leader
- John Clayton – arrangements (9), conductor and leader
- Brad Dechter – orchestration (9)
- Jon Crosse – conductor and leader
- Jules Chakin – contractor
- Terry Woodson – music copyist (1, 5, 8)
- Joanne Kane – music copyist (2–4, 6, 7, 9–14)

Brass and Woodwinds

- Dan Higgins and Greg Huckins – alto saxophone, flute
- Joel Peskin – baritone saxophone, bass clarinet
- Gene Cipriano – tenor saxophone, flute
- Bill Liston – tenor saxophone, clarinet, flute
- Bryant Byers, Steve Holtman, Alex Iles, Andy Martin, Bob McChesney and Bill Reichenbach Jr. – trombone
- Sal Cracchiolo, Charles Davis, Gary Grant, Larry Hall and Warren Luening – trumpet
- Jim Atkinson, Kurt Snyder and Brad Warnaar – French horn

String section

- Bruce Dukov – concertmaster
- Larry Corbett, Ernie Ehrhardt, Vanessa Freebairn-Smith, Anne Karam, Miguel Martinez, Steve Richards and Andrew Shulman – cello
- Gayle Levant – harp
- Marilyn Baker, Pam Goldsmith, Jorge Moraga, Simon Oswell, Karie Prescott, James Ross, Harry Shirinian and Evan Wilson – viola
- Rebecca Bunnell, Darius Campo, Mario De Leon, Joel Derouin, Bruce Dukov, Charles Everett, Kirstin Fife, Armen Garabedian, Berj Garabedian, Tiffany Yi Hu, Patricia Johnson, Peter Kent, Miran Kojian, Razdan Kuyumjian, Dennis Molchan, Jennifer Munday, Anatoly Rosinsky, Haim Shtrum, Les Terry, Mari Tsumura and Shari Zippert – violin

== See also ==
- In a Metal Mood: No More Mr. Nice Guy (1997)
- Lounge Against the Machine (2000)
