= I'm Going Back to School =

Single by Dee Clark
- B-side: "Nobody but You"
- Released: September 1962
- Genre: R&B
- Length: 2:26
- Label: Vee Jay; 462
- Songwriter(s): Dee Clark

Dee Clark singles chronology
| "Dance on Little Girl" (May 1962) | "I'm Going Back to School" (1962) | "Shook up Over You" (February 1963) |

"I'm Going Back to School" is a song written by and performed by Dee Clark.

== Background ==
The single was released in New Zealand on the Allied International record label.

== Chart ==
In 1962, the track reached No. 18 on the U.S. R&B chart and No. 52 on the Billboard Hot 100.
