= Raindrops (Dee Clark song) =

Single by Dee Clark

from the album Hold On...It's Dee Clark
- B-side: "I Want to Love You"
- Released: April 1961
- Recorded: 1961
- Studio: Universal Recording Corp. (Chicago)
- Genre: R&B
- Length: 2:51
- Label: Vee-Jay 383
- Songwriter: Dee Clark

Dee Clark singles chronology
"Your Friends" (1961)	"Raindrops" (1961)	"I'm Going Back to School" (1962)

"Raindrops" is a popular song written and recorded by American R&B singer Dee Clark, released in April 1961.

== Background ==
The ballad is about a man who tries to convince himself that the tears he is crying since his lover's departure are raindrops since "a man ain't supposed to cry." Clark was reportedly inspired to write the song after a late night drive through a heavy rainstorm. Accordingly, the opening and closing of the song both feature heavy rain and thunder sound effects, with the closing augmented by Clark's powerful, swooping falsetto.

Musicians on the record included Al Duncan on drums, Quinn Wilson on bass, Earl Skarritt on electric guitar and Phil Upchurch on acoustic guitar, plus a string section. The song was recorded in a three-hour session at Universal Recording Corporation in Chicago, with Bruce Swedien as engineer.

== Chart performance ==
The song peaked at No.2 on the Hot 100 (held back from No.1 by Gary U.S. Bond's "Quarter To Three"). On other US charts, "Raindrops" peaked at No. 3 on the R&B chart. Billboard ranked it as the ninth most popular song of the year for 1961.

Chart (1961)	Peak position
New Zealand (lever hit parade)	1
U.S. Billboard Hot 100	2
U.S. R&B Singles Chart	3

== Cover versions ==
- In 1966, Jan & Dean included it on their album, Save for a Rainy Day.
- In 1974, Narvel Felts had a top 40 country hit with his rendition.
