= Concept (The Sylvers album) =

Studio album by the Sylvers
- Released: October 11, 1981
- Recorded: 1980–1981
- Studios: Studio Masters, Los Angeles, CA, Record Plant, Los Angeles, CA and Kendun Recorders, Burbank, CA
- Genres: Soul, funk
- Label: SOLAR
- Producers: Leon Sylvers III, Foster Sylvers, James Sylvers

The Sylvers chronology
Disco Fever (1979)	Concept (1981)	Bizarre (1984)

Concept is the ninth album by the Los Angeles, California-based R&B group the Sylvers.

== Reception ==
Professional ratings
Review scores
Source	Rating
Allmusic	1.5/5 stars

Released in October 1981, this would be their only album for SOLAR Records label. It also reunited them with older brother and former member Leon Sylvers III as he was working for SOLAR at the time.

The album's two singles were not as successful, with "Come Back, Lover, Come Back" reaching #63 on Billboard's dance singles chart and "Take It to the Top" failing to chart.

== Track listing ==
1. "Reach Out" (Charmaine Sylvers, Nidra Beard) – 6:14
2. "Come Back Lover, Come Back" (Nidra Beard, Stephen Shockley, William Shelby) – 5:00
3. "Just When I Thought It Was Over" (Glen Barbee, Joey Gallo, Otis Stokes) – 4:37
4. "Take It to the Top" (Charmaine Sylvers) – 4:29
5. "I'm Getting Over" (Kevin Spencer, Nidra Beard, William Shelby) – 4:20
6. "Taking Over" (Charmaine Sylvers, Dana Meyers) – 3:55
7. "P.S. (The Unfinished Letter)" (Dana Meyers) – 4:08
8. "Heart Repair Man" (Karen Elliot) – 5:05
9. "There's a Place" (Julius Johnsen, Karen Elliot) – 3:40

== Personnel ==
- The Sylvers – vocals, background vocals
- Leon Sylvers III – bass, vocals
- Foster Sylvers – bass, percussion
- James Sylvers – keyboards
- Ricky Sylvers – keyboards, guitar
- Patricia Sylvers – keyboards
- Ed Greene, Fred Alexander, Melvin Gentry, Wardell Potts – drums
- Ernest "Pepper" Reed, Richard Randolph, Stephen Shockley – guitar
- William Simmons, Bo Watson, Joey Gallo, Kevin Spencer, Lawrence Hilton-Jacobs, Norman Beavers, Rickey Smith, Sylvester Rivers – keyboards
- Kenny Hudson – percussion
