= The Sylvers II =

Studio album by the Sylvers
- Released: September 3, 1973
- Recorded: 1972–1973
- Genre: Progressive soul
- Label: Pride/MGM
- Producers: Keg Johnson, Jerry Peters

The Sylvers chronology
The Sylvers (1972)	The Sylvers II (1973)	The Sylvers III (1974)

Professional ratings
Review scores
Source	Rating
AllMusic	3/5 stars

The Sylvers II is the second album by American R&B group the Sylvers. Released in 1973, it was produced by Keg Johnson and Jerry Peters. It was their final album for Pride Records before being moved over to Pride's parent label MGM Records for the release of 1974's The Sylvers III.

On June 1, 2018, The Sylvers II was reissued on vinyl as well as issued on CD for the first time on Light in the Attic Records.

== Track listing ==
- All songs written by Leon Sylvers III, except where noted.
1. "We Can Make It If We Try" – 2:40
2. "Through the Love in My Heart" – 3:18
3. "Handle It" – 2:40
4. "I'll Never Let You Go" – 4:30
5. "Cry of a Dreamer" – 4:36
6. "Stay Away from Me" – 3:43
7. "I Don't Need to Prove Myself" – 3:33
8. "Let It Be Me" (Gilbert Bécaud, Mann Curtis, Pierre Delanoë) – 5:00
9. "Love Me, Love Me Not" – 3:49
10. "I Remember" – 3:20
11. "Yesterday" (John Lennon, Paul McCartney) – 2:25

== Charts ==
=== Album ===
Chart (1973)	Peak position
US Top LPs & Tape	164
US Top Soul LPs	37

=== Single ===
Year	Single	Chart	Position
1973	"Stay Away from Me"	US Billboard Hot 100	89
1973	"Stay Away from Me"	US Hot Soul Singles	33
1974	"Through the Love in My Heart"	US Hot Soul Singles	50

== Personnel ==
- Keg Johnson - producer
- Jerry Peters - producer, string and horn arrangements, rhythm track arrangements
- Michael Viner - executive producer
- David Crawford - string and horn arrangements
- Harvey Mason - percussion arrangements
- Jim Shifflett - recording engineer, mixing
- Saul Saget - art direction
- Ron Rafanelli - photography, design
