= How About That (song) =

Single by Dee Clark

from the album How About That
- B-side: "Blues Get Off My Shoulder"
- Released: November 1959
- Genre: R&B
- Length: 2:30
- Label: Abner; 1032
- Songwriter(s): Doris Payne, Frank Augustus

Dee Clark singles chronology
"Hey Little Girl" (August 1959)	"How About That" (1959)	"At My Front Door" (February 1960)

"How About That" is a song written by Doris Payne and Frank Augustus and performed by Dee Clark. In 1959, the track reached No. 10 on the U.S. R&B chart and No. 33 on the Billboard Hot 100.

It was featured on his 1959 album, How About That.
