= Commercial Data Systems =

Canadian software publisher and technology company

Commercial Data Systems, Ltd. (CDS) was a software publisher and technology company based in Emerald Park, Saskatchewan.

In the 1980s, CDS was primarily involved in the production of computer games for 8-bit computers such as the Commodore 64. The best-known and most original of these was Frantic Freddie, which combined fast-paced arcade play with an addictive soundtrack of pop tunes arranged by Kris Hatlelid. Most of their other offerings were either sports simulations or clones of popular arcade games such as Joust (Pegasis) and Frogger (Froggee/Road Toad).

CDS stopped publishing games around 1990. As of the late 1990s, it shifted its business focus to consulting. The company was dissolved in May 2010.

== Software releases ==
- 5-Pin Bowling (1984)
- Frantic Freddie (1983)
- Froggee (1982)
- Motor Mouse
- Pegasis (1983)
- Witch Way (1983)
