= Disco Fever (album) =

Studio album by the Sylvers
- Released: May 24, 1979
- Recorded: 1978–1979
- Studios: Stone Castle Studios, Milan, Italy, MusicLand Studios, Munich, Germany and Rusk Studios, Los Angeles, CA
- Genres: Soul, disco
- Label: Casablanca
- Producers: Giorgio Moroder, Harold Faltermeyer

The Sylvers chronology
Forever Yours (1978)	Disco Fever (1979)	Concept (1981)

Professional ratings
Review scores
Source	Rating
AllMusic	1.5/5 stars

Disco Fever is the eighth album by the Los Angeles, California-based R&B group the Sylvers, released in 1979. This was their second and last album for Casablanca Records.

== Track listing ==
1. "Theme from Mahogany (Do You Know Where You're Going To)" (Gerry Goffin, Mike Masser) – 5:10
2. "Is Everybody Happy" (Al Ross, Edmund Sylvers, Harold Faltermeyer) – 3:55
3. "Come and Stay All Night" (Al Ross, Edmund Sylvers, Moll, Wisnet) – 2:51
4. "Dancing Right Now" (Al Ross, Edmund Sylvers, Harold Faltermeyer) – 5:38
5. "Gimme Gimme Your Lovin'" (Geoff Bastow, Pete Bellotte) – 4:36
6. "I Feel So Good Tonight" (Al Ross, Edmund Sylvers, Moll, Wisnet) – 3:43
7. "Hoochie Coochie Dancin'" (Geoff Bastow, Pete Bellotte) – 3:41
8. "Forever" (Giorgio Moroder, Pete Bellotte) – 4:15

== Personnel ==
- The Sylvers – backing vocals
- Les Hurdle – bass
- Keith Forsey – drums, percussion
- Mats Bjoerklund – guitar
- Harold Faltermeyer – keyboards, synthesizer
- Gary Herbig – saxophone
- Sid Sharp – strings, concertmaster
- Bill Reichenbach Jr., Dick "Slide" Hyde – trombone
- Alan Vizzutti, Gary Grant, Steve Madaio – trumpet
