= Just Keep It Up =

Single by Dee Clark

from the album Dee Clark
- B-side: "Whispering Grass"
- Released: April 1959
- Genre: R&B
- Length: 2:14
- Label: Abner; 1026
- Songwriter(s): Otis Blackwell

Dee Clark singles chronology
"Nobody but You" (September 1958)	"Just Keep It Up" (1959)	"Hey Little Girl" (August 1959)

"Just Keep It Up" is a song written by Otis Blackwell and performed by Dee Clark. In 1959, the track reached No. 9 on the U.S. R&B chart, No. 18 on the Billboard Hot 100, and No. 26 on the UK Singles Chart.

It was featured on his 1959 album, Dee Clark.

== Other Charting Versions ==
- Narvel Felts released a version of the song as a single in 1978. It reached No. 31 on the U.S. country chart.

== Other Versions ==
- Roy Young released a version of the song as a single in 1959.
- Lula Reed released a version of the song as a single in 1962.
- Bobby Vee released a version of the song as the B-side to his 1968 single "Medley: My Girl, Hey Girl".
