= In a Metal Mood: No More Mr. Nice Guy =

Studio album by Pat Boone
- Released: January 28, 1997
- Recorded: 1996
- Studios: Ocean Way Studios, Hollywood, CA
- Genre: Jazz
- Length: 53:13
- Label: Hip-O
- Producers: Michael Lloyd; Jeffrey Weber

Pat Boone chronology
The Pat Boone Family Christmas (1994)	In a Metal Mood: No More Mr. Nice Guy (1997)	Echoes of Mercy (1999)

Professional ratings
Review scores
Source	Rating
AllMusic	2/5 stars

In a Metal Mood: No More Mr. Nice Guy is the 62nd studio album by American singer Pat Boone, released on January 28, 1997, in which Boone covers hard rock and heavy metal songs in a jazz/big band style.

== Overview ==
Boone promoted the album by appearing in leather clothing (and, at that year's American Music Awards, wearing a dog collar). He succeeded in propelling Metal Mood onto the Billboard record charts (making it Boone's first hit album in 36 years), but it did not please some of his older, longtime fans who considered the heavy metal genre in bad taste, or worse. The album has since become somewhat popular as a joke gift to metal fans (as often indicated in reviews given to it), although some serious sites have given it good reviews on its own merits. The album featured guest appearances from well-known rock musicians such as Ronnie James Dio and Ritchie Blackmore.

In October of the same year, and in a similar vein, Steve Lawrence and Eydie Gormé covered Soundgarden's "Black Hole Sun" in a lounge-jazz style on the 1997 compilation album release, Lounge-A-Palooza. This idea of giving rock hits a "standards" treatment was imitated later by Boone's contemporary Paul Anka in the 2005 album Rock Swings, which also featured Anka doing a cover of "Black Hole Sun".

Contrary to popular belief, Boone never covered "Crazy Train" as The Osbournes's theme tune. The version audiences heard was actually performed by session singer Lewis LaMedica, adopting Boone's jazz/big band style. Boone, a former neighbour of the Osbournes, later lamented "I'm flattered... but I wish they had used me. I would have done it for free."

== Track listing ==
1. "You've Got Another Thing Comin'" (Original: Judas Priest) – 4:19
2. "Smoke on the Water" (Original: Deep Purple) – 3:53
3. "It's a Long Way to the Top (If You Wanna Rock 'n' Roll)" (Original: AC/DC) – 4:37
4. "Panama" (Original: Van Halen) – 5:15
5. "No More Mr. Nice Guy" (Original: Alice Cooper) – 3:06
6. "Love Hurts" (Original: Everly Brothers, popularized as a hard rock ballad by Nazareth; composed by Boudleaux Bryant) – 4:57
7. "Enter Sandman" (Original: Metallica) – 3:52
8. "Holy Diver" (Original: Dio) – 4:44
9. "Paradise City" (Original: Guns N' Roses) – 4:41
10. "The Wind Cries Mary" (Original: The Jimi Hendrix Experience) – 4:12
11. "Crazy Train" (Original: Ozzy Osbourne) – 4:32
12. "Stairway to Heaven" (Original: Led Zeppelin) – 4:59

== Personnel ==
- Pat Boone, Ronnie James Dio, Clydene Jackson Edwards, Merry Clayton, Carmen Twillie - vocals
- Ritchie Blackmore, Mitch Holder, Dawayne Bailey, Dweezil Zappa, Dan Ferguson, Michael Thompson - electric guitar
- Doug Cameron, Bruce Dukov, Michelle Richards - violin
- Evan Wilson - viola
- Larry Corbett - cello
- Tom Scott, Gary Herbig, Don Menza, Pete Christlieb, Terry Harrington, Plas Johnson, Jeol Peskin - woodwinds
- Frank Szabo, Chuck Findley, Wayne Bergeron, Rick Baptist, Chris Tedesco - trumpet
- Dick "Slide" Hyde, Lew McCreary, Alan Kaplan, Bruce Otto, Dana Hughes - trombone
- Dave Siebels - organ, keyboards
- Andy Simpkins - acoustic bass
- Marco Mendoza - electric bass
- Gregg Bissonette - drums
- Lenny Castro - percussion
- Sheila E. - timbales

== Chart performance ==
Chart (1997)	Peak position
US Billboard 200	125

== See also ==
- Richard Cheese
- Frank Bennett
- The Mike Flowers Pops
