= The Sylvers III =

Studio album by the Sylvers
- Released: July 21, 1974
- Recorded: 1973–1974
- Genre: Soul
- Label: MGM
- Producers: Perry Botkin, Jr., Michael Viner

The Sylvers chronology
The Sylvers II (1973)	The Sylvers III (1974)	Showcase (1975)

Professional ratings
Review scores
Source	Rating
AllMusic	2.5/5 stars

The Sylvers III is the third album by the Los Angeles, California-based R&B group the Sylvers. Released in 1974, it was produced by Perry Botkin, Jr. and Michael Viner. This was their last recording on MGM before they went to Capitol Records.

The album is notable for having few songwriting credits from primary songwriter Leon Sylvers III. Instead, most of the writing is handled by Sharon Sylvers, group member James Sylvers and the Sylvers family matriarch Shirley Sylvers, who wrote three songs: "Don't Give Up the Good Life", "What's It All About" and "TCB".

In May 2020, The Sylvers III was released to digital and streaming platforms under Republic Records.

== Track listing ==
- Credits adapted from liner notes.
1. "I Aim to Please" (Sharon Sylvers) – 3:08
2. "Could Be You" (James Sylvers) – 4:40
3. "Wish You Were Here" (James Sylvers) – 2:20
4. "Don't Give Up the Good Life" (Shirley Sylvers) – 3:00
5. "Even This Shall Pass Away" (Leon Sylvers III) – 3:50
6. "Am I Truly Yours" (Leon Sylvers III) – 3:40
7. "Be My Love" (Sharon Sylvers) – 3:05
8. "Love Over Mind" (Dana Marshall) – 3:40
9. "What's It All About" (Shirley Sylvers) – 2:35
10. "TCB" (Sharon Sylvers, Shirley Sylvers) – 3:10

== Personnel ==
- The Sylvers - primary artist
- Michael Viner - producer
- Perry Botkin, Jr. - producer
- Suzanne Ayers - photography
- David Wiseltier - design
