= Jackson 5ive (TV series) =

Animated television series

- Title card
- Written by: Romeo Muller; William J. Keenan; Hal Hackady; Lou Silverstone; Susan Milburn
- Directed by: Arthur Rankin, Jr. Jules Bass
- Starring: Cast
- Theme music composer: The Jackson 5
- Composer: Maury Laws
- Countries of origin: United States; United Kingdom
- No. of seasons: 2
- No. of episodes: 23

Production
- Producers: Arthur Rankin, Jr. Jules Bass
- Production companies: Rankin/Bass (copyrighted as Videocraft International); Motown Productions; Animation Services; Halas & Batchelor Animation; Topcraft Limited Company; Estudios Moro

Original release
- Network: ABC
- Release: September 11, 1971 – October 14, 1972

Jackson 5ive was a Saturday morning cartoon series that aired for two seasons on ABC from September 11, 1971 to October 14, 1972. Produced by Rankin/Bass and Motown Productions, it is a fictionalized portrayal of the careers of Motown recording group the Jackson 5.

The series was rebroadcast in syndication in 1984–85, during a period when Michael Jackson was riding a major wave of popularity as a solo artist. It also briefly re-aired in 1999 on TV Land as part of their "Super Retrovision Saturdaze" lineup. The series was animated mainly in London at the studios of Halas and Batchelor, and some animation done at Estudios Moro (Barcelona, Spain) and Topcraft Limited Company (Tokyo, Japan).

== Overview ==
Due to high demands on the group, the roles of Jackie, Tito, Jermaine, Marlon, and Michael were played by voice actors, with records of the group's songs being used for the musical tracks of the show. The group did make some contribution to the cartoon in the form of live photographs of each member morphing into a cartoon which was shown in the title screen medley. Although the musical scenes of the cartoon were chiefly animation, an occasional live-action footage of a concert or music video of The Jackson 5 would be spliced into the cartoon series. The actual Jackson 5 also contributed to the show by posing for pictures prior to the cartoon's debut which were used as posters, newspaper clips and TV Guide spots advertising the forthcoming TV series.

Though Berry Gordy did not provide the original voice (his character was voiced by Paul Frees) nor advertised his name, his character was frequently involved as the "adult figure" to the group. R&B/Pop singer Diana Ross contributed to voice her fictionalized self in the debut episode. The premise of the show is that the Jackson Five would have adventures similar to Josie and the Pussycats, Alvin and the Chipmunks or The Partridge Family, with the unique addition being that Berry Gordy, the manager of the band in the show's universe, would come up with an idea for publicity for the band, such as having to do farm work or play a concert for the President of the United States. The series was followed by The Jacksons, a live action variety show, in 1976.

One enthusiastic viewer of the show was Michael Jackson himself. He admitted years later that he would watch and yell with delight, "I'm a cartoon!"

=== Music ===
The theme song of the TV show was a medley of four of the group's biggest hits at the time ("I Want You Back", "The Love You Save", "ABC" and "Mama's Pearl") served as the show's theme song. Each episode would feature two songs by The Jackson 5. The songs were derived from their albums Diana Ross Presents The Jackson 5 (1969), ABC, Third Album (both 1970) and Maybe Tomorrow (1971). For the Season 2 episodes, eight songs were derived from Michael Jackson's album Got to Be There (1971) and two songs from The Jackson 5 album Lookin' Through the Windows (1972).

=== Pets ===
Because Michael Jackson owned many pets in real life, a few pets were added as extra characters to the cartoon. They included Michael's pet mice, Ray and Charles (alluding to singer Ray Charles, one of his idols), and his pet snake Rosey the Crusher. Other than the mice squeaking, the pets never spoke, but usually contributed either assistance or mischief, or joined the Jackson brothers in their performances.

=== Laugh track ===
Like most 1970s-era Saturday morning cartoon series, The Jackson 5ive contained an adult laugh track. Rankin-Bass experimented with creating their own laugh track, a practice Hanna-Barbera had implemented, in 1971. This was done to avoid paying large fees to Charley Douglass, who edited laugh tracks onto the majority of network television shows at the time. Like Hanna-Barbera, Rankin/Bass isolated several snippets of canned chuckles from Douglass’ library, and inserted them onto the soundtrack. The laughs initially consisted of only loud eruptions; mild jokes received unnatural bouts of laughter, while other times, the laughter would erupt mid-sentence.

The studio had improved the process by the second season, using more modulated laughs culled from Douglass's 1971–1972 library. Laughs did not erupt mid-sentence like the first season and were better timed by Rankin/Bass sound engineers. The improved technique was also utilized for the sister series The Osmonds. Unlike Hanna-Barbera's laugh track, Rankin/Bass provided a larger variety of laughs.

Rankin/Bass ceased using laugh tracks after The Jackson 5ive and The Osmonds both ended their original runs.

== Cast ==
- Paul Frees as The Jackson 5's producer
- Donald Fullilove as Michael Jackson
- Edmund Sylvers as Marlon Jackson
- Joel Cooper as Jermaine Jackson
- Mike Martinez as Tito Jackson
- Craig Grandy as Jackie Jackson
- Diana Ross as herself (pilot episode only)

== Episodes ==
=== Season 1 (1971–72) ===
No.	Title	Unit Director	Original release date
1	"It All Started With..."	Tony Guy	September 11, 1971
The pilot episode, introducing the five brothers, their pets, their producer (Berry Gordy) and the apocryphal origin story of the Jacksons depicting Diana Ross as their mentor who discovered them when they saved her from their pet snake, Rosey, then their struggle to get discovered in Motown. Songs: "ABC", "Goin' Back to Indiana"
2	"Pinestock U.S.A."	Oscar Grillo	September 18, 1971
The Jackson brothers agree to play an outdoor concert similar to Woodstock, but learn that the concert is endorsed by a logging camp where a bunch of lumberjacks will level the forests right after the concert concludes. Songs: "I'll Be There", "The Young Folks"
3	"Drafted"	Harold Whitaker	September 25, 1971
The Jackson 5 are scheduled to give a USO concert at Fort Paratrooper, but due to a mixup Marlon and Michael have been mistaken for recruits. The other brothers do jobs such as kitchen patrol and running the obstacle course in order to rescue Michael and Marlon. Songs: "I Want You Back", "2-4-6-8"
4	"Mistaken Identity"	Tony Guy	October 2, 1971
The Jacksons, out west driving to a tour date in Las Vegas, get sidetracked in an Old West town where they are mistaken for five ornery bandit brothers. Songs: "I'll Bet You", "Sixteen Candles"
5	"Bongo, Baby, Bongo"	Oscar Grillo	October 9, 1971
Michael finds himself the unwitting and reluctant adopted son of a female gorilla whose bongo-playing offspring is petnapped by a malevolent clown for his circus act, while the other four find ways to rescue Michael from the lovesick animal. Songs: "My Little Baby", "It's Great to Be Here"
6	"The Winners' Circle"	Tom Halley	October 16, 1971
Visiting a race track, Michael is tricked by a somewhat shifty horse racer into accidentally buying an unmotivated horse who can race real fast when their music is being played; the horse racer comes up with a plan to make sure they lose everything. Songs: "The Love You Save", "How Funky is Your Chicken"
7	"CinderJackson"	Tony Guy	October 23, 1971
The brothers hear at a press conference that Mr. Leo F. King, a show business entrepreneur, is holding a lavish birthday party for Samantha Christie, the Princess of Pop, but Michael is sick and is unable to attend her party. But while sleeping upside down, he dreams of getting a package from Gary, Indiana, which he thinks is chicken soup, but is soon greeted by an Afro-crowned "Hairy Godfather" fairy who grants him a wish to see the star. Songs: "Reach In", "Can I See You in the Morning?"
8	"The Wizard of Soul"	Oscar Grillo	October 30, 1971
Michael dreams of wandering into an oasis called the Land of Soul, in which he sees each of his brothers play a familiar Wizard of Oz character. Together they journey to find the "Wizard of Soul", who, if located, can help him get back to his (real) brothers and get to the show on time. Michael would later play the Scarecrow in the 1978 film adaptation of The Wiz. Songs: "The Love I Saw in You Was Just a Mirage", "Oh How Happy"
9	"The Tiny Five"	Lee Mishkin	November 6, 1971
The Jacksons are shrunk to miniature size by a mad scientist and have to avoid large household perils to reverse the mishap that miniaturized them. Songs: "The Wall", "I Will Find a Way"
10	"The Groovatron"	Tony Guy	November 13, 1971
The Jacksons tour themselves to exhaustion and long to take a break. Marlon, depicted as a gear-head genius, builds an Afro-wearing musical robot titled "The Groovatron" to stand in for them for future performance dates. However, a shifty salesman named Sam Sham witnesses the successful maiden performance of the robot, kidnaps it, and sends it on tour on its own, replacing The Jacksons and having it sell out instead of them. The brothers scheme at once to kidnap their robot back before their careers are destroyed. Songs: "Maybe Tomorrow", "Nobody"
11	"Ray & Charles: Superstars"	Sauli Rantamäki	November 20, 1971
Ray and Charles become envious of the success of their owners and decide to become stars on their own. Discovered by Hollywood, the two mice become superstars overnight and as soon as they do, the brothers fear that success will go to their heads. Songs: "(Come 'Round Here) I'm the One You Need", "(We've Got) Blue Skies"
12	"Farmer Jacksons"	John Perkins	November 27, 1971
Jackie decides that his family should have a break from superstardom and places a bet with a crook to run a farm, which leads to disasters with the animals, the food and the farm itself. Songs: "My Cherie Amour", "Honey Chile"
13	"Jackson Island"	Tony Guy	December 4, 1971
On a flight to Hawaii, the five brothers crash onto an island, where a coconut hits Michael's head, making him fall asleep, and he dreams of meeting the most fictional and evil pirates in history. Songs: "Ready or Not (Here I Come)", "La-La (Means I Love You)"
14	"The Michael Look"	Harold Whitaker	December 11, 1971
When stranded without his stage clothing in a travel mishap at Heathrow Airport in London, Michael unwisely consults two envious Pearly Kings threatened by his success who use the opportunity to plot to discredit him. The two Pearlies conspire to trick Michael into dressing in shabby patches and rags for his royal performance, but once he is seen on Carnaby Street, his look becomes a British fashion sensation. Songs: "Darling Dear", "Don't Know Why I Love You"
15	"Jackson Street, U.S.A."	Lee Mishkin	December 18, 1971
The Mayor of Gary, Indiana, declares a street in town will be renamed "Jackson 5 Boulevard", and invites the Jackson brothers to perform on declaration day. The Jacksons plan to touch down in the town square by means of a hot air balloon, but a mishap sends the balloon soaring past and out of the city. (Ironically, the group's final album would be called 2300 Jackson Street.); Songs: "Petals", "She's Good"
16	"Rasho-Jackson"	Tony Guy	January 8, 1972
In an eerie precognition of future events, "Rasho-Jackson" depicts the Jackson brothers becoming alienated. Intended to parody the Japanese artistic film Rashomon, the episode predicts how the Jackson phenomenon would end in twenty years. Berry Gordy is depicted bringing the brothers back together again. Songs: "One More Chance", "I Found That Girl"
17	"A Rare Pearl"	Oscar Grillo	January 15, 1972
The Jacksons swear off girls after a series of romantic mishaps, but immediately fall in love with an attractive female flight attendant named Jacqueline Pearl on their next tour flight. Jacqueline shuns all interest in the brothers and recruits her muscular football player older brother to give the Jacksons the scare of their lives when they pursue her at home. Songs: "Never Can Say Goodbye", "Mama's Pearl"

=== Season 2 (1972) ===
This season was billed as The New Jackson 5ive Show.

No.	Title	Unit Director	Original release date
18	"Who's Hoozis?"	Robert Balser	September 9, 1972
The Jackson 5 are scheduled to perform at an outdoor concert, but when Michael discovers a talking "blues bird" (a play on "blues" and bluebird) and learns that the jazz-musician voiced bird and his nest, containing an egg soon to hatch, are in danger from bulldozers scheduled to tear down the concert park, Michael investigates. He learns a wealthy magnate named Hoozis owns the building overlooking the endangered park, and at once moves in to interfere. Hoozis is patterned after eccentric U.S. millionaire Howard Hughes. Songs: "Rockin' Robin", " Wings of My Love"
19	"Michael White"	Tony Guy	September 16, 1972
When he bumps his head in a bicycling accident, Michael dreams he is a storybook prince hiding in a tiny cottage where his brothers are dwarf-sized and warn him not to eat the poisoned apple a visiting crone soon offers (as in the story of Snow White and the Seven Dwarfs). Naturally, Michael bites the apple and immediately collapses as though dead. Songs: "Sugar Daddy", "I Wanna Be Where You Are"
20	"Groove to the Chief"	Tony Guy	September 23, 1972
Michael fantasizes about what it would be like to become Mayor of Los Angeles. In a dream, his Hairy Godfather (back from the episode "CinderJackson") grants his wish and Michael discovers that it is a bigger job than he thought. The Hairy Godfather is the only character to play a recurring role in The Jackson 5ive besides Berry Gordy. Songs: "I'm So Happy", "In Our Small Way"
21	"Michael in Wonderland"	Tony Guy	September 30, 1972
Before a show in the Wonderland theme park, Michael accidentally falls unconscious while testing a new roller coaster ride and dreams he is in Wonderland, where he encounters soul and funk-related versions of Wonderland's famous characters. Songs: "Got to Be There", "Maria (You Were the Only One)"
22	"Jackson and the Beanstalk"	Tony Guy	October 7, 1972
Michael dreams of coming across magic beans that grow a beanstalk outside his and his brothers' Indiana apartment (as in the story of Jack and the Beanstalk). When he climbs to the top, he wanders into a fabulous land and encounters the giant. Songs: "Love Is Here and Now You're Gone", "Girl Don't Take Your Love From Me"
23	"The Opening Act"	Robert Balser	October 14, 1972
A promoter books the brothers on a heavy radio tour schedule, while trying to find an opening act for their upcoming concert. Songs: "Little Bitty Pretty One", "If I Have to Move a Mountain"

== Home media ==
On January 15, 2013, Classic Media released The Jackson 5ive: The Complete Animated Series on DVD and Blu-ray in Region 1 for the very first time. The 2-disc set features all 23 episodes of the series. For the remastered print (The Jackson 5ive: The Complete Animated Series), the mono soundtrack was replaced by the 5.1 surround soundtrack in the songs, the rest of the scenes kept the mono soundtrack. The laugh track is mute for the home video release. As of 2025, there are no more plans to reissue the series due to complications with likeness and legal music rights.
