= Nobody but You (Dee Clark song) =

Single by Dee Clark

from the album Dee Clark
- B-side: "When I Call On You"
- Released: September 1958
- Genre: R&B
- Length: 2:26
- Label: Abner; 1019
- Songwriter: Dee Clark

Dee Clark singles chronology
"Oh Little Girl" (February 1958)	"Nobody but You" (1958)	"Just Keep It Up" (April 1959)

"Nobody but You" is a song written and performed by Dee Clark. In 1958, the track reached No. 3 on the U.S. R&B chart and No. 21 on the Billboard Hot 100.

It was featured on his 1959 album, Dee Clark.

The song ranked No. 24 on the Billboard year-end top 50 R&B singles of 1959.

== Other versions ==
- Joe Simon released a version of the song on his 1966 album Simon Pure Soul.
- Willie Hightower released a version of the song as the B-side to his 1968 single "It's a Miracle".
