= Misdemeanor (song) =

1973 single by Foster Sylvers

Single by Foster Sylvers

from the album Foster Sylvers
- B-side: "So Close"
- Released: 1973
- Genre: R&B
- Length: 2:33
- Label: Pride; MGM
- Songwriter: Leon Sylvers III
- Producer: Keg Johnson

Foster Sylvers singles chronology
"Misdemeanor" (1973)	"Hey Little Girl" (1973)

Music video
- "Misdemeanor" on YouTube

"Misdemeanor" is a song performed by American rhythm and blues singer Foster Sylvers; issued as the first single from his eponymous debut studio album. Written by his brother Leon, the song was his only hit on the Billboard Hot 100, peaking at #22 on the chart in 1973.

Jess Harvell of Freaky Trigger has written of the song in retrospect: "So musically this comes over like a '99 era Irv Gotti/Ja Rule track (you know, when they were good): stop-start rhythm, lotsa chimes, pizzicato xylophone(?). Only the dippy-dippy-do funk bass maroons it in the 70s. It's fucking great."

== Charts ==
Chart performance for "Misdemeanor"
Chart (1973)	Peak position
US Billboard Hot 100	22
US R&B Singles (Billboard)	7
