= Showcase (The Sylvers album) =

Studio album by the Sylvers
- Released: August 20, 1975
- Recorded: 1974–1975
- Studio: Total Experience Recording Studios (Hollywood, California)
- Genre: Soul, disco
- Label: Capitol
- Producer: Freddie Perren

The Sylvers chronology
The Sylvers III (1974)	Showcase (1975)	Something Special (1976)

Showcase is the fourth album by the Los Angeles, California-based R&B group the Sylvers.

== Reception ==
Professional ratings
Review scores
Source	Rating
Allmusic	4/5 stars
Christgau's Record Guide	C

Released in 1975, this would be their first of three albums for Capitol Records and one of two that were produced by Freddie Perren.

The album released only two singles: "Boogie Fever" reaching number one in the U.S. on both the Billboard Hot 100 and Hot Soul Singles charts as well as reaching number one in Canada on the RPM national singles chart in 1976. The second single "Cotton Candy" peaked on Billboard R&B Chart Position #19.

== Track listing ==
1. "Cotton Candy" (Kenneth St. Lewis, Freddie Perren, Christine Yarian) – 2:55
2. "The Roulette Wheel of Love" (Freddie Perren, Kenneth St. Lewis) – 3:25
3. "Boogie Fever" (Freddie Perren, Kenneth St. Lewis) – 3:31
4. "Storybook Girl" (R. Wyatt, Christine Yarian, St. Lewis) – 3:20
5. "Ain't No Good in Good-Bye" (Freddie Perren, Kenneth St. Lewis) – 3:40
6. "Free Style" (Leon Sylvers III) – 2:59
7. "I Can Be for Real" (Leon Sylvers III) – 3:38
8. "Clap Your Hands to the Music" (Leon Sylvers III) – 3:30
9. "Keep On Keepin' On" (R. Wyatt, Christine Yarian, Freddie Perren) – 3:16
10. "Ain't Nothin' but a Party" (Leon Sylvers III) – 5:24

== Charts ==
Chart (1975/76)	Peak position
Australia (Kent Music Report)	37
Billboard Pop Albums	58
Billboard Top Soul Albums	23

=== Singles ===
Year	Single	Chart positions		
Year	Single	US	US R&B	AUS
1975	"Boogie Fever"	1	1	7
1976	"Cotton Candy"	59	19	-

== Personnel ==
Credits adapted from liner notes.

- Freddie Perren - producer, arranger
- Wade Marcus - arranger
- Larkin Arnold - executive producer
- Larry Miles - recording engineer, remixing
- Steve Pouliot - assistant engineer
- Andrew Berliner - engineer (strings and horns)
- Jeff Sanders - mastering
