= Foster Sylvers =

American singer (1962–2026)

- Born: Foster Emerson Sylvers; February 25, 1962; Memphis, Tennessee, U.S.
- Died: May 30, 2026 (aged 64)
- Genres: R&B; dance; soul; disco; funk
- Occupation: Singer
- Instrument: Vocals
- Years active: 1971–2026
- Labels: MGM Records; Capitol Records; EMI America; A&M Records
- Formerly of: The Sylvers

Foster Emerson Sylvers (February 25, 1962 – May 30, 2026) was an American singer. He is best known for being a member of the family act The Sylvers and his hit single "Misdemeanor".

== Life and career ==
Foster Emerson Sylvers was born in Memphis, Tennessee, on February 25, 1962. He released his first album, Foster Sylvers, in June 1973. His first single, "Misdemeanor", written by his brother Leon Sylvers III, became a hit that summer, reaching number 7 on the Billboard R&B chart. "Misdemeanor"'s follow-up was a cover of Dee Clark's 1959 hit "Hey Little Girl", and charted at number 63 R&B in fall 1973. The popularity of these records led Foster to appear on such TV shows as American Bandstand and Soul Train.

In 1974 he released his second album, Foster Sylvers Featuring Pat & Angie Sylvers. By 1975 he joined his brothers and sisters in The Sylvers just in time for the Showcase album. He sang co-lead with his brother Edmund on the number one 1976 Billboard Hot 100 and Hot Soul Singles song "Boogie Fever". While with Capitol, Foster released another self-titled album called Foster Sylvers in early 1978, primarily produced by his family The Sylvers and their managers Al Ross and Bob Cullen. Foster then branched out into studio work just like his big brother Leon collaborating on many projects such as with Dynasty ("Your Piece of the Rock", "When You Feel Like Giving Love", "Satisfied") and Evelyn "Champagne" King ("Shake Down", number 12 R&B, spring 1984). By the late 1980s, Foster recorded two albums as Foster Sylvers & Hy-Tech: 1987's Plain & Simple for EMI America and 1990's Prime Time for A&M.

In 1994, he was convicted of a sex offense and incarcerated. His charge: Oral copulation - victim unconscious of the nature of the act. He remained on the list of sex offenders on the State of California Department of Justice Sex Offenders Profile.

Sylvers died from prostate cancer on May 30, 2026, at the age of 64.

== Discography ==
=== Studio albums ===
Year	Album	Chart positions		Record label
Year	Album	US	US R&B	Record label
1973	Foster Sylvers	159	31	Pride/MGM
1974	Foster Sylvers Featuring Pat & Angie Sylvers	—	—	Pride/MGM
1978	Foster Sylvers	—	—	Capitol
1987	Plain and Simple (as Foster Sylvers & Hy-Tech)	—	—	EMI America
1990	Prime Time (as Foster Sylvers & Hy-Tech)	—	—	A&M Records
"—" denotes releases that did not chart or were not released in that territory.

=== Singles ===
Year	Single	Chart positions	
Year	Single	US	US R&B
1973	"Misdemeanor"	22	7
1973	"Hey, Little Girl"	92	63
1978	"Don't Let Me Go for Someone Else"	—	—
1978	"Knocking at Your Door"	—	—
1986	"Flavour" (as Foster Sylvers & Hy-Tech)	—	—
1987	"I'll Make All Your Dreams Come True" (as Foster Sylvers & Hy-Tech)	—	—
1990	"I'll Do It" (as Foster Sylvers & Hy-Tech)	—	—
"—" denotes releases that did not chart or were not released in that territory.
