= Baby O =

- Album cover

Background information
- Also known as: Baby'O
- Origin: United States
- Genres: Pop
- Labels: Calibre, Baby'O Music Enterprises, Inc.

Baby O (sometimes written Baby'O) was an American male vocal/instrumental pop group. The band members were Steve Lukather from Toto on guitar, Paulinho da Costa on percussion, Greg Mathieson, who went to produce Sheena Easton's 1985 classic "Sugar Walls," on keyboards, and future actor Miguel Ferrer on drums.

Their only chart success was called "In the Forest", which was released on the Calibre record label. Described as a "blast from the past", it featured Latin rhythms. On the Billboard dance chart, "In the Forest" peaked at #2 for two weeks and stayed in the chart for 32 weeks. It entered the UK Singles Chart on 26 July 1980, and reached #46; it was in the chart for five weeks.
