= Hot Line (song) =

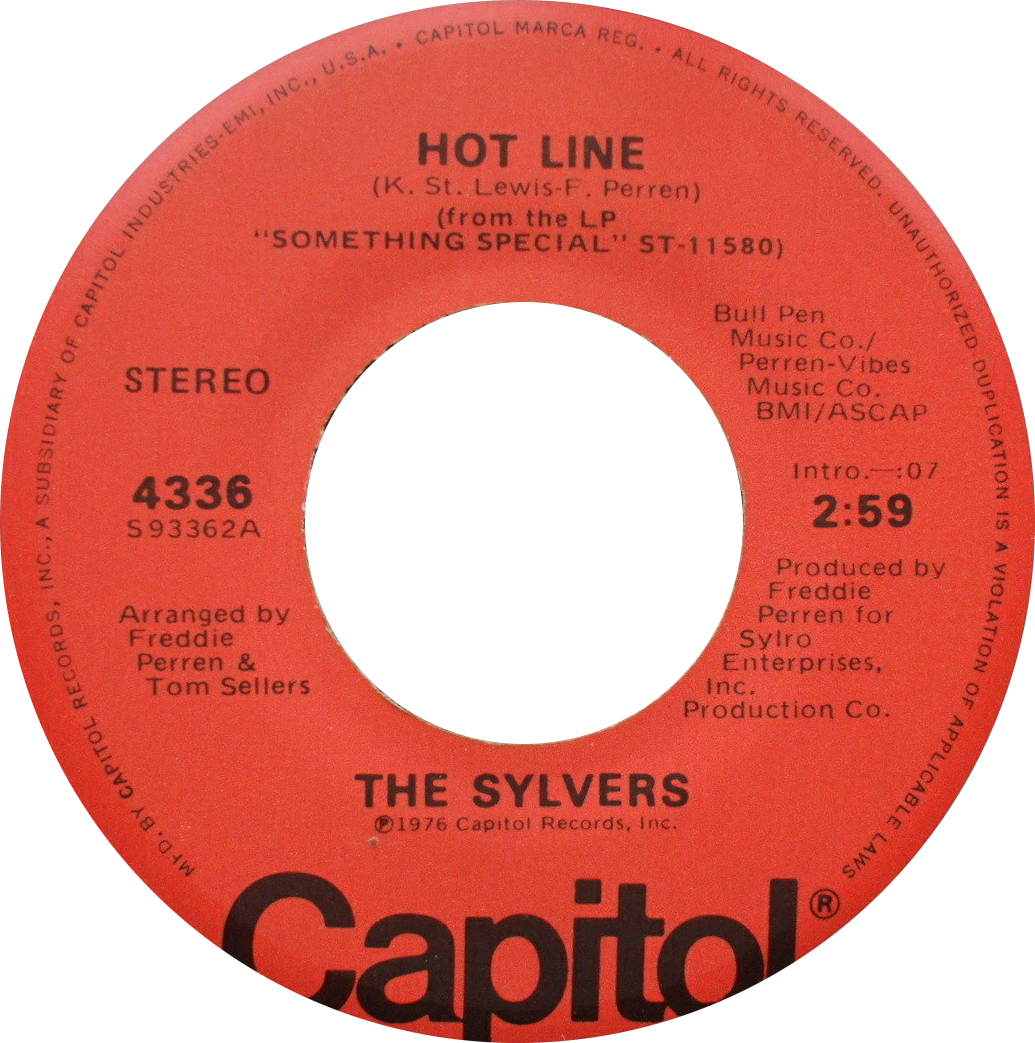
- One of side-A labels of the US single

Single by the Sylvers

from the album Something Special
- B-side: "That's What Love Is Made Of"
- Released: September 1976
- Recorded: 1976
- Genre: Soul, disco
- Length: 2:59 (single); 4:30 (album)
- Label: Capitol Records
- Songwriter(s): Freddie Perren, Kenneth St. Lewis
- Producer(s): Freddie Perren

The Sylvers singles chronology
"Cotton Candy" (1976)	"Hot Line" (1976)	"High School Dance" (1977)

"Hot Line" is a song recorded by American family group the Sylvers, from their 1976 album Something Special. It was written by Freddie Perren and Kenneth St. Lewis. It became an international Top 10 hit, and is a gold record.

The song tells the story of a lovelorn young man who anticipates getting in touch with his beloved over the phone. He requests that the telephone operator connect the call but not listen in. He also says that he's willing to get in touch with the FBI and the CIA in order to locate the girl he's interested in speaking to.

"Hot Line" was the Sylvers' second biggest hit, peaking in early 1977 at number 5 on the Billboard Hot 100 chart, number 4 on the Cash Box chart, and number 3 on the R&B charts. Billboard ranked the song as the 25th biggest hit of 1977.

== Chart performance ==
=== Weekly charts ===
Chart (1976–1977)	Peak position
Australia (Kent Music Report)	26
Canada RPM Top Singles	1
New Zealand	10
U.S. Billboard Hot 100	5
U.S. Cash Box Top 100	4
U.S. Billboard Hot Soul Singles	3
U.S. Cash Box R&B Singles	1

=== Year-end charts ===
Chart (1977)	Rank
Canada	32
U.S. Billboard Hot 100	25
American Top 40 Year-End	15
