= Dee Clark =

American soul singer (1938–1990)

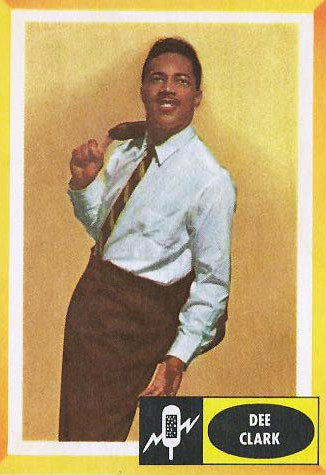
- Clark in 1960

Background information
- Born: Delecta Clark; November 7, 1938; Blytheville, Arkansas, U.S.
- Died: December 7, 1990 (aged 52) Smyrna, Georgia, U.S.
- Genres: R&B, soul
- Occupations: Singer, songwriter
- Instrument: Vocals
- Years active: 1952–1990
- Labels: Abner, Vee-Jay, London, Constellation

Dee Clark (November 7, 1938 – December 7, 1990) was an American soul singer and songwriter best known for a string of R&B and pop hits in the late 1950s and early 1960s, including the song "Raindrops", which became a million-seller in the United States in 1961.

== Career ==
He was born Delectus Clark or Delecta Clark Jr. in Blytheville, Arkansas, and moved to Chicago in 1941. His mother, Essie Mae Clark, was a gospel singer and encouraged her son to pursue his love of music. Clark made his first recording in 1952 as a member of the Hambone Kids, who enjoyed some success with a recording of "Hambone" on the OKeh label. In 1953, he joined an R&B group called the Goldentones, who later became the Kool Gents and were discovered by Chicago radio DJ Herb Kent upon winning a talent competition. Kent had the Kool Gents signed to Vee-Jay label's subsidiary Falcon/Abner. The group recorded for Falcon/Abner in 1956, and also recorded a novelty record as "The Delegates".

Clark embarked on a solo career in 1957, initially following the styles of Clyde McPhatter and Little Richard. When Little Richard temporarily abandoned his music career to study the Bible, Clark fulfilled Richard's remaining live dates and also recorded with his backing band, the Upsetters. Over the next four years he landed several moderate hits, two of which ("Just Keep It Up" and "Hey Little Girl") reached the top 20 on the Billboard Hot 100). His records for Abner and Vee-Jay were orchestrated by Riley Hampton. His biggest single, "Raindrops", was a dramatic ballad with a mid-tempo Latin beat that was augmented by heavy rain and thunder sound effects and Clark's swooping falsetto. It was released in the spring of 1961 and became his biggest hit, soaring to number two on the pop chart and number three on the R&B chart. It sold over one million copies, and was awarded a gold disc. "Raindrops" was also an international success, reaching number one in New Zealand and reaching the top ten in South Africa and Belgium, and selling well in Japan. "Raindrops" remains a staple on oldies and adult standards radio station playlists to this day, and has also been covered by several other artists in the years since, including David Cassidy, Tony Orlando and Dawn, and Narvel Felts, who took the song to number 30 on the country chart in 1974. Clark himself recorded an updated version of "Raindrops" in 1973.

However, Clark's biggest hit was also his last. The follow-up to "Raindrops", "Don't Walk Away from Me", was a flop, and he made the pop chart in America only twice more, with "I'm Going Back to School" (1962) and "Crossfire Time" (1963). By the time "Crossfire Time" came out, Clark had moved from Vee-Jay to the Constellation label. Though he continued to record for Constellation through 1966, none of his records charted nationally. He had considerable local success in Chicago with such standout recordings as "Come Closer" (1964), the double-sided hit of "Warm Summer Breezes" and "Heartbreak" (1964), and "TCB" (1965). He later recorded for the Columbia, Wand, Liberty and Rocky labels, without success. Clark had a brief revival in 1975 when his disco song "Ride a Wild Horse" became a surprise Top 30 hit in the UK Singles Chart, becoming his first chart hit in the UK since "Just Keep It Up".

Afterwards, Clark performed mostly on the oldies circuit. By the late 1980s, he was in dire straits financially, living at The Lone Oaks motel in Toccoa, Georgia. Despite suffering a stroke in 1987 that left him partially paralyzed and with a mild speech impediment, he continued to perform until his death on December 7, 1990, in Smyrna, Georgia, from a heart attack at the age of 52. His last concert was with the Jimmy Gilstrap Band at the Portman Lounge in Anderson, South Carolina.

== Discography ==
=== Albums ===
| Year | Album | Record Label |
|---|---|---|
| 1959 | How About That | Abner |
| 1959 | Dee Clark | Abner |
| 1960 | You're Lookin' Good | Vee-Jay |
| 1961 | Hold On....It's Dee Clark | Vee-Jay |
| 1962 | Best Of Dee Clark | Vee-Jay |

=== Singles ===
| Year | Title | Peak chart positions | | | Record Label | B-side | Album |
| Year | Title | US Pop | US R&B | UK | Record Label | B-side | Album |
|---|---|---|---|---|---|---|---|
| 1957 | "Gloria" | — | — | — | Falcon | "Kangaroo Hop" | You're Lookin' Good |
| 1957 | "Seven Nights" | — | — | — | Falcon | "24 Boy Friends" | Dee Clark |
| 1958 | "Oh Little Girl" | — | — | — | Falcon | "Wondering" | — |
| 1958 | "Nobody but You" | 21 | 3 | — | Abner | "When I Call On You" | Dee Clark |
| 1959 | "Just Keep It Up" | 18 | 9 | 26 | Abner | "Whispering Grass" | Dee Clark |
| 1959 | "Hey Little Girl" | 20 | 2 | — | Abner | "If It Wasn’t for Love" | Dee Clark |
| 1959 | "How About That" | 33 | 10 | — | Abner | "Blues Get Off My Shoulder" | How About That |
| 1960 | "At My Front Door" | 56 | — | — | Abner | "Cling A Ling" | How About That |
| 1960 | "You're Looking Good" | 43 | — | — | Vee Jay | "Gloria" | You're Lookin' Good |
| 1960 | "Your Friends" | 34 | 30 | — | Vee Jay | "Because I Love You" | Hold On....It's Dee Clark |
| 1961 | "Raindrops" | 2 | 3 | — | Vee Jay | "I Want to Love You" | Hold On....It's Dee Clark |
| 1961 | "Don’t Walk Away From Me" | 104 | — | — | Vee Jay | "You’re Telling Our Secrets" | — |
| 1962 | "You Are Like the Wind" | — | — | — | Vee Jay | "Drums in My Heart" | — |
| 1962 | "Dance on Little Girl" | — | — | — | Vee Jay | "Fever" | — |
| 1962 | "I'm Going Back to School" | 52 | 18 | — | Vee Jay | "Nobody but You" | — |
| 1963 | "Shook up Over You" | 125 | — | — | Vee Jay | "I'm a Soldier Boy" | — |
| 1963 | "How Is He Treating You" | — | — | — | Vee Jay | "The Jones Brothers" | — |
| 1963 | "Walking My Dog" | — | — | — | Vee Jay | "Nobody But Me" | — |
| 1963 | "Crossfire Time" | 92 | — | — | Constellation | "I'm Going Home" | — |
| 1964 | "That’s My Girl" | — | — | — | Constellation | "It's Raining" | — |
| 1964 | "Come Closer" | — | — | — | Constellation | "That's My Girl" | — |
| 1964 | "Heartbreak" | 119 | — | — | Constellation | "Warm Summer Breezes" | — |
| 1965 | "In My Apartment" | — | — | — | Constellation | "I Ain’t Gonna Be Your Fool" | — |
| 1965 | "T.C.B." | 132 | — | — | Constellation | "It's Impossible" | — |
| 1965 | "I Can't Run Away" | — | — | — | Constellation | "She's My Baby" | — |
| 1965 | "Hot Potato" | — | — | — | Constellation | "I Don't Need (Nobody Like You)" | — |
| 1966 | "I'm Goin' Home" | — | — | — | Constellation | "Ole Fashun Love" | — |
| 1967 | "Lost Girl" | — | — | — | Columbia | "In These Very Tender Moments" | — |
| 1968 | "Nobody but You - PT. 1" | — | — | — | Wand | "Nobody but You - PT. 2" | — |
| 1970 | "Where Did All the Good Times Go" | — | — | — | Liberty | "24 Hours of Loneliness" | — |
| 1971 | "Old Time Religion" | — | — | — | United Artists | "You Can Make Me Feel Good" | — |
| 1973 | "Raindrops "73"" | — | — | — | Rocky | "Happy Man" | — |
| 1975 | "Ride a Wild Horse" | — | — | 16 | Chelsea | "Ride a Wild Horse" (Instrumental) | — |
