= Hey Little Girl (Dee Clark song) =

Single by Dee Clark

from the album Dee Clark
- B-side: "If It Wasn't for Love"
- Released: August 1959
- Genre: R&B
- Length: 2:15
- Label: Abner; 1029
- Songwriter(s): Otis Blackwell, Bobby Stevenson

Dee Clark singles chronology
"Just Keep It Up" (April 1959)	"Hey Little Girl" (1959)	"How About That" (November 1959)

"Hey Little Girl" is a song written by Otis Blackwell and Bobby Stevenson and performed by Dee Clark. In 1959, the track reached No. 2 on the U.S. R&B chart and No. 20 on the Billboard Hot 100.

It was featured on his 1959 album, Dee Clark.

The song ranked No. 40 on the Billboard year-end top 50 R&B singles of 1959.

== Other Charting Versions ==
- Foster Sylvers released a version of the song as a single in 1973. It reached No. 63 on the U.S. R&B chart and No. 92 on the Billboard Hot 100.

== Other Versions ==
- Thurston Harris released a version of the song as a single in 1959.
- Little Tony and His Brothers released a version of the song as the B-side to his 1959 single "The Hippy Hippy Shake".
- Roy Young released a version of the song as a single in 1959.
- Fabian released a version of the song on his 1961 album Rockin' Hot.
- Bobby Vee released a version of the song as the B-side to his 1965 single "True Love Never Runs Smooth".
- Dave Berry released a version of the song on his 1966 album One Dozen Berrys.
