= The Sylvers =

American R&B family vocal group

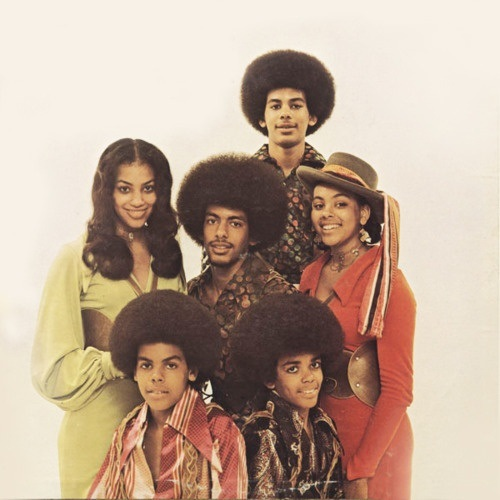
- The Sylvers c. 1972

Background information
- Also known as: The Four Little Angels (early tenure)
- Origin: Los Angeles, California, U.S.
- Genres: R&B; soul; disco
- Years active: 1958–1985
- Labels: Pride Records; MGM Records; Capitol Records; Casablanca Records; SOLAR Records; Geffen Records
- Past members: Olympia Ann "Olan" Sylvers; Leon Frank Sylvers III; Charmaine Elaine Sylvers; James Jonathan Sylvers; Edmund Theodore Sylvers; Joseph Richard "Ricky" Sylvers; Angelia Marie "Angie" Sylvers; Patricia Lynn "Pat" Sylvers; Foster Emerson Sylvers

The Sylvers were an American R&B family vocal group from Watts, a neighborhood in Los Angeles. They recorded the singles "Fool's Paradise", "Boogie Fever", and "Hot Line" during the 1970s. Prior to becoming the Sylvers, the four eldest members (Olympia, Leon, Charmaine, and James) recorded as the Little Angels, appearing on shows including You Bet Your Life and Make Room for Daddy. They opened for acts like Johnny Mathis and Ray Charles. During that time, they released two singles: "Santa Claus Parade" b/w "I'll Be a Little Angel" on Warwick Records and "Says You" b/w "Olympia" on Capitol Records.

== Background ==
=== Members ===
The Sylvers family consisted of ten siblings, nine of whom performed in the band at different times:

- Olympia Ann "Olan" Sylvers (born October 13, 1951) — vocals
- Leon Frank Sylvers III (born March 7, 1953) — bass, vocals
- Charmaine Elaine Sylvers (born March 9, 1954) — vocals
- James Jonathan Sylvers (born June 8, 1955) — keyboards, vocals
- Edmund Theodore Sylvers (January 25, 1957 — March 11, 2004) — vocals, percussion
- Joseph Richard "Ricky" Sylvers (born October 13, 1958) guitar, vocals
- Angelia Marie "Angie" Sylvers (born April 11, 1960) — vocals
- Patricia Lynn "Pat" Sylvers (born March 25, 1961) — additional keyboards, vocals
- Foster Emerson Sylvers (February 25, 1962 — May 30, 2026) — additional bass, vocals

Christopher Joseph Sylvers (1966–1985), the youngest of the Sylvers siblings, never performed with the group.

=== Career ===
Shirley Mae Wyble and Leon Frank "Sonny" Sylvers married after meeting at Xavier University of Louisiana in New Orleans. They had ten children. They taught their children to play music, sing and dance. Olympia "Olan", Leon, and Charmaine performed as the Little Angels, choosing mainly Caribbean Calypso–styled soul music. The Sylvers appeared in several variety shows, charity shows, community events, and other public venues. One of the earliest events promoting the group was when the whole family appeared on the quiz game show "You Bet Your Life" with Groucho Marx. Soon after, Jonathan "James" joined the group, and the four of them continued to perform, gaining slight success. Appearing in several television shows, and media appearances. In the mid-1960s, they released recordings on Capitol Records.

In the late 1960s, they added Edmund and Joseph Richard "Ricky" to the group. After signing a recording contract with MGM, the sextet changed their name from the Little Angels to the Sylvers and released three albums on the MGM/Pride label, titled simply The Sylvers, The Sylvers 2, and The Sylvers 3. Released between 1972 and 1974, these LPs offered soulful numbers written by Leon and produced by Jerry Butler (of the Impressions) and Keg Johnson. Four singles from the self-titled albums entered the Billboard R&B charts. The song "Fool's Paradise" reached No. 14 on the R&B charts in the autumn of 1972. The single featured Charmaine, Edmund, and Ricky as lead singers, backed by the harmonies of Olympia, Leon, and James.

"Wish That I Could Talk to You" was the next single. During early 1973, it became the siblings' first top 10 song. The track features Leon, Edmund, and Ricky on lead. The two-sided hit "Stay Away From Me" (No. 33) and "I'll Never Be Ashamed", as well as "Through the Love in My Heart" (No. 50), followed; and album track "Cry of a Dreamer" received significant airplay at R&B radio outlets. In early 1973, Leon wrote an uptempo proto-disco song called "Misdemeanor" for the group's second album. However, the lead vocal, sung by Edmund, was later reassigned to younger brother Foster, who was not an official member of the Sylvers at this time. The song also featured younger Sylvers Angie and Pat, received airplay on R&B radio stations, and later became popular in the late 1980s and 1990s when it was sampled by rapper/producer Dr. Dre for a song by the D.O.C. entitled "It's Funky Enough".

After the success of "Misdemeanor", Foster, Angie, and Pat quickly joined their older brothers and sisters to the official Sylvers group, (upping the total members to nine), and signed an exclusive contract with Capitol Records, the same label they recorded for as the Little Angels. The label teamed the family with R&B producer Freddie Perren ( the Jackson 5). Perren, with co-writer Keni St. Lewis, produced the two-million seller "Boogie Fever" which topped the R&B and Billboard Hot 100 charts, along with the RPM national singles chart.

=== Solo careers ===
As the world's appetite for dance music waned in the early 1980s, so did the Sylvers' popularity. In 1981, five members of the group, now without Edmund, recorded a new album Concept for Solar Records, with Leon producing and playing bass but not performing vocally. The first single from that effort, "Come Back Lover, Come Back" (featuring a now grown-up Foster on lead) was a minor hit, reaching No. 63 in Billboard. "Take It to the Top" failed to chart, but both singles appear on the Solar Records retrospective box set.

In 1984, after a three-year hiatus, the siblings (now six strong, with Charmaine returning) regrouped with new management (Weisner–DeMann) and a new label (Geffen Records). The result was an unsuccessful album entitled Bizarre. The disc was not heavily promoted, but spawned two minor hits: "In One Love and Out the Other" (No. 42) and "Falling For Your Love" (No. 76). The Sylvers' youngest sibling, Christopher, died of hepatitis on June 18, 1985, at age 18. He was never part of the performing family. After the disappointing sales performance of the Geffen LP, the brothers and sisters officially disbanded in 1985. They would continue to do studio work, playing and singing background vocals for artists including Janet Jackson. Edmund recorded a solo album for Arista in 1985, but it was never released in the United States, although a single from the set, "I Love the Streets", was released in Japan in 1989. Foster started his own group, Hy-Tech, in 1989, but two CDs went relatively unnoticed, as did a solo MP3 CD in 1998 called "Foster Vs. Foster".

Lead singer Edmund, who played Marlon Jackson's voice on the 1971–1973 ABC-TV Saturday morning cartoon series The Jackson 5ive, died of lung cancer in Richmond, Virginia, on March 11, 2004, at age 47. In 2007, Pat shared lead on the Larry O. Williams gospel duet, "Thank You". In the December 10, 2007 issue of Jet magazine the Sylvers were featured in the "Where Are They Now?" segment. In early 2008, a few siblings did an interview with Damien Maurice on his show Just Chillin' with KPOO-FM in San Francisco. Both a Jet article and the radio interview hinted at the possibility of new Sylvers music in the near future.

During the summer of 2011, the Sylvers were featured on the TV One hit series, Unsung. Leon, James, Charmaine, Angie and Pat—along with their mother Shirley—appeared on the show to discuss their career successes and aftermath. It was mentioned that both Foster and Ricky had been incarcerated at the time of taping for parole violations. However, after the release of Foster, he and his sisters Angie and Pat made a television appearance on The Cindy Davis Show to discuss the politics of the music industry, and more.

Foster Sylvers died from complications of prostate cancer on May 30, 2026, at age 64.

== Legacy and influence ==
The Sylvers track Only One Can Win appears as a sample in J Dilla’s track Two Can Win on his 2006 album Donuts.

== Discography ==
=== Studio albums ===
Year	Album	Chart positions			Record label	Available on CD
Year	Album	US	US R&B	AUS	Record label	Available on CD
1972	The Sylvers	180	15	—	Pride Records	Japan only
1973	The Sylvers II	164	37	—	Pride Records	Yes
1974	The Sylvers III	91	51	—	MGM Records	Japan only
1975	Showcase	58	23	37	Capitol Records	Yes
1976	Something Special	80	13	65	Capitol Records	UK only
1977	New Horizons	134	43	—	Capitol Records	Yes
1978	Forever Yours	132	40	—	Casablanca Records	No
1979	Disco Fever	—	52	—	Casablanca Records	No
1981	Concept	92	76	—	SOLAR Records	Yes
1984	Bizarre	—	—	—	Geffen Records	No
"—" denotes the album failed to chart

=== Compilation albums ===
Year	Album	Chart positions		Record label
Year	Album	US	US R&B	Record label
1978	Best of the Sylvers	—	—	Capitol
1994	Greatest Hits	—	—	Curb Records
1995	Boogie Fever: The Best of the Sylvers	—	—	Razor & Tie
2002	Classic Masters	—	—	Capitol
2003	The Best of the Sylvers	—	—	EMI-Capitol
"—" denotes the album failed to chart

=== Singles ===
Year	Single	Chart positions					Album
Year	Single	US	US R&B	AUS	CAN	NZ	Album
1971	"I'm Just a Lonely Soul"	—	—	—	—	—	Singles only
1972	"Time to Ride"	—	—	—	—	—	Singles only
1972	"Fool's Paradise"	94	14	—	—	—	The Sylvers
1972	"Wish I Could Talk to You"	77	10	—	—	—	The Sylvers
1973	"Stay Away from Me"	89	33	—	—	—	The Sylvers II
1974	"Through the Love in My Heart"	—	50	—	—	—	The Sylvers II
1976	"Boogie Fever"	1	1	7	1	4	Showcase
1976	"Cotton Candy"	59	19	—	77	—	Showcase
1976	"Hot Line"	5	3	27	1	10	Something Special
1977	"High School Dance"	17	6	—	8	18	Something Special
1977	"Any Way You Want Me"	72	12	—	66	—	New Horizons
1978	"New Horizons"	—	45	—	—	—	New Horizons
1978	"Don't Stop, Get Off"	—	15	—	—	—	Forever Yours
1979	"Forever Yours"	—	—	—	—	—	Forever Yours
1979	"Mahogany"	—	—	—	—	—	Disco Fever
1979	"Hoochie Coochie Dancin'"	—	—	—	—	—	Disco Fever
1981	"Come Back Lover, Come Back"	—	63	—	—	—	Concept
1984	"In One Love and Out the Other"	—	42	—	—	—	Bizarre
1985	"Falling for Your Love"	—	76	—	—	—	Bizarre
"—" denotes the single failed to chart
