= Edmund Sylvers =

American singer-songwriter, actor and musician

- Sylvers, 1974
- Born: Edmund Theodore Sylvers; January 25, 1957; Memphis, Tennessee, U.S.
- Died: March 11, 2004 (aged 47); Richmond, Virginia, U.S.
- Occupations: Singer; songwriter; actor
- Years active: 1971–2004
- Partner: Freda Payne (1979–1983)
- Children: 11
- Relatives: see Sylvers family
- Musical career
- Origin: Los Angeles, California, U.S.
- Genres: Pop; R&B; Soul; Dance; Disco; Funk
- Instruments: Vocals; drums
- Labels: MGM; Capital; Casablanca
- Formerly of: The Sylvers

Edmund Theodore Sylvers (January 25, 1957 – March 11, 2004) was an American singer–songwriter, actor and musician. Sylvers was best known as the lead singer of the American family disco/soul music vocal group The Sylvers, which had popular success with songs such as "Boogie Fever" during the mid- to late-1970s.

== Biography ==
Born in Memphis, Tennessee, and raised in Los Angeles, California, Sylvers was the fifth child born to Shirley Mae (née Wyble) (1932 – 2014) and Leon Frank Sylvers Jr. (1932 – 2005). At the age of 14, he began his entertainment career as a voice actor playing the role of Marlon Jackson on the ABC TV cartoon series The Jackson 5ive. After the series ended when he was 15, Sylvers joined his family-based group as the lead singer, and he was 18 in 1975 when he sang lead on the group's biggest hit, "Boogie Fever". After the group's success passed, Sylvers embarked on a solo career, releasing his debut Have You Heard in 1980.

=== Personal life ===
Sylvers dated singer Freda Payne (who was 15 years his senior) from 1979 until January 1983. Sylvers had 11 children, one of whom is actor Jeremy Sylvers, who is most known for his role in the 1991 horror film Child's Play 3. Ten months after being diagnosed with lung cancer, Edmund Sylvers died at a Virginia hospital on March 11, 2004, at age 47.
