= Ray, Goodman & Brown discography =

Discography list

- Studio albums: 17
- Live albums: 2
- Compilation albums: 6
- Singles: 49
- No. 1 Singles: 3

Ray, Goodman & Brown are an American R&B/soul vocal group. The group originated as The Moments in the mid-1960s; their greatest success came in the 1970s with hits including "Love on a Two-Way Street", "Sexy Mama", and "Look at Me (I'm in Love)". In 1979, for contractual reasons they changed their name to Ray, Goodman & Brown and had further hits, including No. 1 hit gold single "Special Lady". By 1988, the group had a total of 38 R&B chart hits.

== The Moments discography ==
=== Studio albums ===
| Year | Album | Chart positions | | Record label |
| Year | Album | US | US R&B | Record label |
|---|---|---|---|---|
| 1969 | Not on the Outside, But on the Inside, Strong! | — | 8 | Stang |
| 1970 | A Moment with the Moments | — | 36 | Stang |
| 1971 | On Top | — | — | Stang |
| 1972 | The Other Side of the Moments | — | — | Stang |
| 1973 | My Thing | — | — | Stang |
| 1974 | Those Sexy Moments | — | — | Stang |
| 1974 | O'Jays Meet the Moments | — | — | Stang |
| 1975 | Look at Me | 132 | 13 | Stang |
| 1976 | Moments with You | — | 40 | Stang |
| 1978 | Sharp | — | — | Stang |
"—" denotes the album failed to chart

=== Live albums ===
| Year | Album | Chart positions | | Record label |
| Year | Album | US | US R&B | Record label |
|---|---|---|---|---|
| 1972 | Live at the New York State Women's Prison | 147 | 25 | Stang |
| 1974 | Live at the Miss Black America Contest | — | — | Stang |
"—" denotes the album failed to chart

=== Compilation albums ===
| Year | Album | Chart positions | | Record label |
| Year | Album | US | US R&B | Record label |
|---|---|---|---|---|
| 1971 | The Moments Greatest Hits | 184 | 24 | Stang |
| 1974 | The Best of the Moments | — | 23 | Stang |
| 1984 | Greatest Hits of the Moments | — | — | Chess |
| 1996 | The Best of the Moments: Love on a Two-Way Street | — | — | Rhino |
"—" denotes the album failed to chart

=== Singles ===
| Year | Single | Chart Positions | | | | Certifications |
| Year | Single | US | US R&B | AUS | UK | Certifications |
|---|---|---|---|---|---|---|
| 1968 | "Not on the Outside" | 57 | 13 | — | — | |
| 1969 | "Sunday" | 90 | 13 | — | — | |
| 1969 | "I Do" | 62 | 10 | — | — | |
| 1969 | "I'm So Lost" | — | 43 | — | — | |
| 1969 | "Lovely Way She Loves" | — | 14 | — | — | |
| 1970 | "Love on a Two-Way Street" | 3 | 1 | — | — | US: Gold |
| 1970 | "If I Didn't Care" | 44 | 7 | — | — | |
| 1970 | "All I Have" | 56 | 9 | — | — | |
| 1971 | "I Can't Help It" | — | 27 | — | — | |
| 1971 | "That's How It Feels" | — | 34 | — | — | |
| 1971 | "Lucky Me" | 98 | 31 | — | — | |
| 1971 | "To You with Love" | — | 36 | — | — | |
| 1972 | "Thanks a Lot" | — | 41 | — | — | |
| 1972 | "Just Because He Wants to Make Love (Doesn't Mean He Loves You)" | — | 25 | — | — | |
| 1972 | "My Thing" | — | 19 | — | — | |
| 1973 | "Girl I'm Gonna Miss You" | — | — | — | — | |
| 1973 | "Gotta Find a Way" | 68 | 16 | — | — | |
| 1973 | "Sexy Mama" | 17 | 3 | — | — | |
| 1974 | "Sho Nuff Boogie (Part 1)" (with Sylvia) | 80 | 45 | — | — | |
| 1974 | "Sweet Sweet Lady" | — | 29 | — | — | |
| 1974 | "What's Your Name" | — | 28 | — | — | |
| 1974 | "Girls (Part 1)" (with the Whatnauts) | — | 25 | 100 | 3 | BPI: Silver |
| 1975 | "Look at Me (I'm in Love)" | 39 | 1 | — | 42 | |
| 1975 | "Got to Get to Know You" | — | — | — | — | |
| 1975 | "Dolly My Love" | — | — | — | 10 | |
| 1976 | "Nine Times" | — | 44 | — | 51 | |
| 1976 | "With You" | — | 14 | — | — | |
| 1977 | "Jack in the Box" | — | — | — | 7 | BPI: Silver |
| 1977 | "We Don't Cry Out Loud" | — | 79 | — | — | |
| 1977 | "I Don't Wanna Go" | — | 18 | — | — | |
| 1978 | "I Could Have Loved You" | — | 20 | — | — | |
| 1978 | "It Don't Rain in My Backyard" | — | — | — | — | |
| 1980 | "Baby Let's Rap Now (Part 1)" | — | 39 | — | — | |
| 1981 | "Record Breakin' Love Affair" | — | — | — | — | |
"—" denotes the single failed to chart

== Ray, Goodman & Brown discography ==
=== Studio albums ===
| Year | Album | Chart positions | | Certifications | Record label |
| Year | Album | US | US R&B | Certifications | Record label |
|---|---|---|---|---|---|
| 1979 | Ray, Goodman & Brown | 17 | 2 | US: Gold | Polydor |
| 1980 | Ray, Goodman & Brown II | 84 | 16 | | Polydor |
| 1981 | Stay | 151 | 33 | | Polydor |
| 1982 | Open Up | — | — | | Polydor |
| 1984 | All About Love, Who's Gonna Make the First Move? | — | — | | Panoramic |
| 1986 | Take It to the Limit | — | 24 | | EMI America |
| 1988 | Mood for Lovin' | — | 66 | | Manhattan Records |
| 2002 | A Moment With Friends | — | — | | Defouvus Records |
| 2003 | intimate Moments | — | — | | Orpheus Records |
"—" denotes the album failed to chart

=== Compilation albums ===
| Year | Album | Record label |
|---|---|---|
| 1996 | The Best of Ray, Goodman & Brown | PolyGram |
| 2002 | The Millennium Collection: The Best of Ray, Goodman & Brown | Polydor |

=== Singles ===
| Year | Single | Chart Positions | | |
| Year | Single | US | US R&B | AUS |
|---|---|---|---|---|
| 1979 | "Special Lady" | 5 | 1 | 46 |
| 1980 | "Inside of You" | 76 | 14 | — |
| 1980 | "My Prayer" | 47 | 31 | — |
| 1980 | "Happy Anniversary" | — | 16 | — |
| 1981 | "Shoestrings" | — | 67 | — |
| 1981 | "How Can Love So Right (Be So Wrong)" | — | 30 | — |
| 1982 | "Stay" | — | — | — |
| 1982 | "Till the Right One Comes Along" | — | — | — |
| 1982 | "Gambled on Your Love" | — | — | — |
| 1982 | "After All" | — | — | — |
| 1984 | "Who's Gonna Make the First Move" | — | 61 | — |
| 1986 | "Take It to the Limit" | — | 8 | — |
| 1987 | "Celebrate Our Love" | — | 34 | — |
| 1987 | "(Baby) Let's Make Love Tonight" | — | — | — |
| 1988 | "Where Did You Get That Body, (Baby)?" | — | 61 | — |
"—" denotes the single failed to chart
