= List of Billboard Hot 100 top-ten singles in 1980 =

Music singles chart in 1980

This is a list of singles that have peaked in the Top 10 of the Billboard Hot 100 during 1980. The longest running top-ten single of the year was "Another One Bites the Dust" by Queen with 15 weeks. Kenny Rogers, Air Supply, and Michael Jackson each had three top-ten hits in 1980, tying them for the most top-ten hits during the year.

A total of 90 songs hit the top 10 throughout the year.

== Top-ten singles ==
- (#) – 1980 Year-end top 10 single position and rank

List of Billboard Hot 100 top ten singles which peaked in 1980
Top ten entry date	Single	Artist(s)	Peak	Peak date	Weeks in top ten
Singles from 1979
November 10	"Please Don't Go"	KC and the Sunshine Band	1	January 5	11
December 8	"Do That to Me One More Time" (#5)	Captain & Tennille	1	February 16	14
December 22	"Ladies' Night"	Kool & the Gang	8	January 12	5
Singles from 1980
January 5	"Rock with You" (#4)	Michael Jackson	1	January 19	9
January 5	"Coward of the County"	Kenny Rogers	3	January 26	8
January 5	"We Don't Talk Anymore"	Cliff Richard	7	January 19	4
January 19	"Cruisin'"	Smokey Robinson	4	February 2	7
January 19	"Cool Change"	Little River Band	10	January 19	1
January 26	"Crazy Little Thing Called Love" (#6)	Queen	1	February 23	12
January 26	"Sara"	Fleetwood Mac	7	February 2	5
January 26	"The Long Run"	Eagles	8	February 2	3
February 2	"Yes, I'm Ready"	Teri DeSario with K.C.	2	March 1	7
February 2	"Don't Do Me Like That"	Tom Petty and the Heartbreakers	10	February 2	2
February 9	"Longer"	Dan Fogelberg	2	March 15	7
February 16	"Desire"	Andy Gibb	4	March 8	8
February 16	"On the Radio"	Donna Summer	5	March 8	6
March 1	"Another Brick in the Wall" (#2)	Pink Floyd	1	March 22	12
March 1	"Working My Way Back to You (Forgive Me, Girl)"	The Spinners	2	March 29	8
March 8	"Him"	Rupert Holmes	6	March 29	5
March 8	"The Second Time Around"	Shalamar	8	March 22	4
March 15	"Too Hot"	Kool & the Gang	5	April 5	5
March 22	"How Do I Make You"	Linda Ronstadt	10	March 22	3
March 29	"Call Me" (#1)	Blondie	1	April 19	12
March 29	"Ride Like the Wind"	Christopher Cross	2	April 26	9
April 5	"Special Lady"	Ray, Goodman & Brown	5	April 19	4
April 12	"With You I'm Born Again"	Billy Preston and Syreeta Wright	4	April 19	6
April 12	"I Can't Tell You Why"	Eagles	8	April 19	4
April 12	"Off the Wall"	Michael Jackson	10	April 12	2
April 19	"Lost in Love"	Air Supply	3	May 3	6
April 19	"Fire Lake"	Bob Seger & The Silver Bullet Band	6	May 3	4
April 26	"Sexy Eyes"	Dr. Hook	5	May 24	6
April 26	"You May Be Right"	Billy Joel	7	May 3	4
May 3	"Hold On (To My Love)"	Jimmy Ruffin	10	May 3	2
May 10	"Don't Fall in Love with a Dreamer"	Kenny Rogers with Kim Carnes	4	May 24	5
May 17	"Funkytown" (#8)	Lipps Inc.	1	May 31	9
May 17	"Biggest Part of Me"	Ambrosia	3	June 7	8
May 24	"Stomp!"	The Brothers Johnson	7	May 24	2
May 24	"Hurt So Bad"	Linda Ronstadt	8	May 24	3
May 24	"Cars"	Gary Numan	9	June 7	5
May 31	"Coming Up (Live at Glasgow)" (#7)	Wings	1	June 28	11
May 31	"Against the Wind"	Bob Seger & The Silver Bullet Band	5	June 14	6
June 7	"The Rose" (#10)	Bette Midler	3	June 28	8
June 7	"Little Jeannie"	Elton John	3	July 19	11
June 14	"It's Still Rock and Roll to Me" (#9)	Billy Joel	1	July 19	11
June 14	"Steal Away"	Robbie Dupree	6	July 12	7
June 21	"She's Out of My Life"	Michael Jackson	10	June 21	2
June 28	"Cupid (I've Loved You for a Long Time)"	The Spinners	4	July 19	7
July 5	"Let's Get Serious"	Jermaine Jackson	9	July 12	3
July 12	"Magic" (#3)	Olivia Newton-John	1	August 2	9
July 12	"Let Me Love You Tonight"	Pure Prairie League	10	July 12	2
July 19	"Shining Star"	The Manhattans	5	July 19	5
July 26	"Take Your Time (Do It Right)"	The S.O.S. Band	3	August 16	7
July 26	"Tired of Toein' the Line"	Rocky Burnette	8	July 26	2
August 2	"Sailing"	Christopher Cross	1	August 30	7
August 2	"Emotional Rescue"	The Rolling Stones	3	September 6	8
August 9	"Upside Down"	Diana Ross	1	September 6	14
August 16	"Let My Love Open the Door"	Pete Townshend	9	August 16	3
August 16	"More Love"	Kim Carnes	10	August 16	3
August 23	"All Out of Love"	Air Supply	2	September 13	10
August 23	"Fame"	Irene Cara	4	September 13	6
August 30	"Give Me the Night"	George Benson	4	September 27	7
September 6	"Lookin' for Love"	Johnny Lee	5	September 20	5
September 6	"Late in the Evening"	Paul Simon	6	September 27	7
September 13	"Another One Bites the Dust"	Queen	1	October 4	15
September 13	"Drivin' My Life Away"	Eddie Rabbitt	5	October 4	6
September 20	"One in a Million You"	Larry Graham	9	September 20	2
September 27	"I'm Alright"	Kenny Loggins	7	October 11	5
October 4	"Woman in Love"	Barbra Streisand	1	October 25	11
October 4	"Xanadu"	Olivia Newton-John and Electric Light Orchestra	8	October 11	3
October 11	"Real Love"	The Doobie Brothers	5	October 25	5
October 18	"He's So Shy"	The Pointer Sisters	3	October 25	5
October 25	"Lady"	Kenny Rogers	1	November 15	13
October 25	"The Wanderer"	Donna Summer	3	November 15	6
October 25	"Never Knew Love Like This Before"	Stephanie Mills	6	November 15	5
November 1	"I'm Coming Out"	Diana Ross	5	November 15	6
November 1	"Master Blaster (Jammin')"	Stevie Wonder	5	December 6	8
November 15	"(Just Like) Starting Over"	John Lennon	1	December 27	14
November 15	"More Than I Can Say"	Leo Sayer	2	December 6	9
November 22	"Dreamin'"	Cliff Richard	10	November 22	3
December 6	"Hungry Heart"	Bruce Springsteen	5	December 27	8
December 13	"Hit Me with Your Best Shot"	Pat Benatar	9	December 20	4

=== 1979 peaks ===
List of Billboard Hot 100 top ten singles in 1980 which peaked in 1979
Top ten entry date	Single	Artist(s)	Peak	Peak date	Weeks in top ten
October 20	"Still"	Commodores	1	November 17	13
November 3	"Babe"	Styx	1	December 8	11
November 24	"Send One Your Love"	Stevie Wonder	4	December 22	10
December 1	"Escape (The Piña Colada Song)"	Rupert Holmes	1	December 22	10

=== 1981 peaks ===
List of Billboard Hot 100 top ten singles in 1980 which peaked in 1981
Top ten entry date	Single	Artist(s)	Peak	Peak date	Weeks in top ten
November 29	"Love on the Rocks"	Neil Diamond	2	January 10	10
December 13	"Guilty"	Barbra Streisand and Barry Gibb	3	January 10	7
December 20	"Every Woman in the World"	Air Supply	5	January 31	8
December 27	"The Tide Is High"	Blondie	1	January 31	10
December 27	"Tell It Like It Is"	Heart	8	January 10	4

== See also ==
- 1980 in music
- List of Billboard Hot 100 number ones of 1980
- Billboard Year-End Hot 100 singles of 1980
