= Ray, Goodman & Brown (album) =

Studio album by Ray, Goodman & Brown
- Released: 1979
- Studio: H&L Sound Studios (Englewood Cliffs, New Jersey)
- Genre: Soul
- Length: 36:49
- Label: Polydor
- Producer: Barbara Baker (exec.); Vincent Castellano (also exec.)

Ray, Goodman & Brown chronology
| Sharp (1978) | Ray, Goodman & Brown (1979) | Ray, Goodman & Brown II (1980) |

Singles from Ray, Goodman & Brown
- 1. "Special Lady" Released: 1979; 2. "Inside of You" Released: 1979

Professional ratings
Review scores
| Source | Rating |
|---|---|
| AllMusic | 4/5 stars |
| Christgau's Record Guide | B+ |

Ray, Goodman & Brown is the eponymous studio album by American R&B/soul vocal trio Ray, Goodman & Brown, released in 1979 through Polydor Records. Recording sessions took place at H & L Sound Studios in Englewood Cliffs, New Jersey with record producer Vincent Castellano. The album peaked at number 17 on the Billboard Top LPs & Tape chart and number 2 on the Soul LPs chart in the United States, and was certified gold by the Recording Industry Association of America on April 2, 1980. It spawned the hit singles: "Special Lady" and "Inside of You", which charted on the Billboard Hot 100 singles chart at No. 5 and No. 76, respectively. Its lead single, "Special Lady", became number-one R&B single in the U.S. and was certified gold by the RIAA on May 13, 1980.

== Track listing ==
All music is composed by Vincent Castellano.

| No. | Title | Writer(s) | Length |
|---|---|---|---|
| 1. | "Inside of You" | Harry Milton Ray; Willie Albert Goodman; Henrietta Goodman; Lee Walter Morris | 5:00 |
| 2. | "Special Lady" | Harry Milton Ray; Willie Albert Goodman; Lee Walter Morris | 4:15 |
| 3. | "Slipped Away" | Harry Milton Ray; Willie Albert Goodman; Lee Walter Morris | 3:56 |
| 4. | "The Way It Should Be" | Lou Toby; George Kerr; Barbara Baker; Vincent Castellano | 4:27 |
| 5. | "Treat Her Right" | George Kerr; Vincent Castellano | 3:30 |
| 6. | "Thrill / Friends" | Harry Milton Ray; Willie Albert Goodman; Lee Walter Morris; Lou Toby; George Kerr; Vincent Castellano | 7:52 |
| 7. | "Deja Vu" | Lou Toby; Pete Lore; Robert Natiello | 3:35 |
| 8. | "Another Day" | Harry Milton Ray; Willie Albert Goodman; Lee Walter Morris; Lou Toby; George Kerr; Vincent Castellano | 4:14 |
| Total length: | | | 36:49 |

== Personnel ==
- Harry Milton Ray – vocals
- Willie Albert "Al" Goodman – vocals
- William Anthony "Billy" Brown – vocals
- Vincent Castellano – producer, executive producer
- Barbara Baker – executive producer
- Stephen A. Jeromos – engineering
- Gregory Calbi – mastering
- Stephanie Cataliotti – coordinator
- Robert L. Heimall – art direction
- Stephanie Zuras – design
- John Paul "Bud" Endress – photography

== Charts ==
=== Weekly charts ===
| Chart (1980) | Peak position |
|---|---|
| Dutch Albums (Album Top 100) | 35 |
| US Billboard 200 | 17 |
| US Top R&B/Hip-Hop Albums (Billboard) | 2 |

=== Year-end charts ===
| Chart (1980) | Position |
|---|---|
| US Billboard 200 | 73 |
| US Top R&B/Hip-Hop Albums (Billboard) | 14 |

== Certifications ==
| Region | Certification | Certified units/sales |
|---|---|---|
| United States (RIAA) | Gold | 500,000^{^} |
^{^} Shipments figures based on certification alone.
