= Billboard Year-End Hot 100 singles of 1980 =

Ranking of recorded music

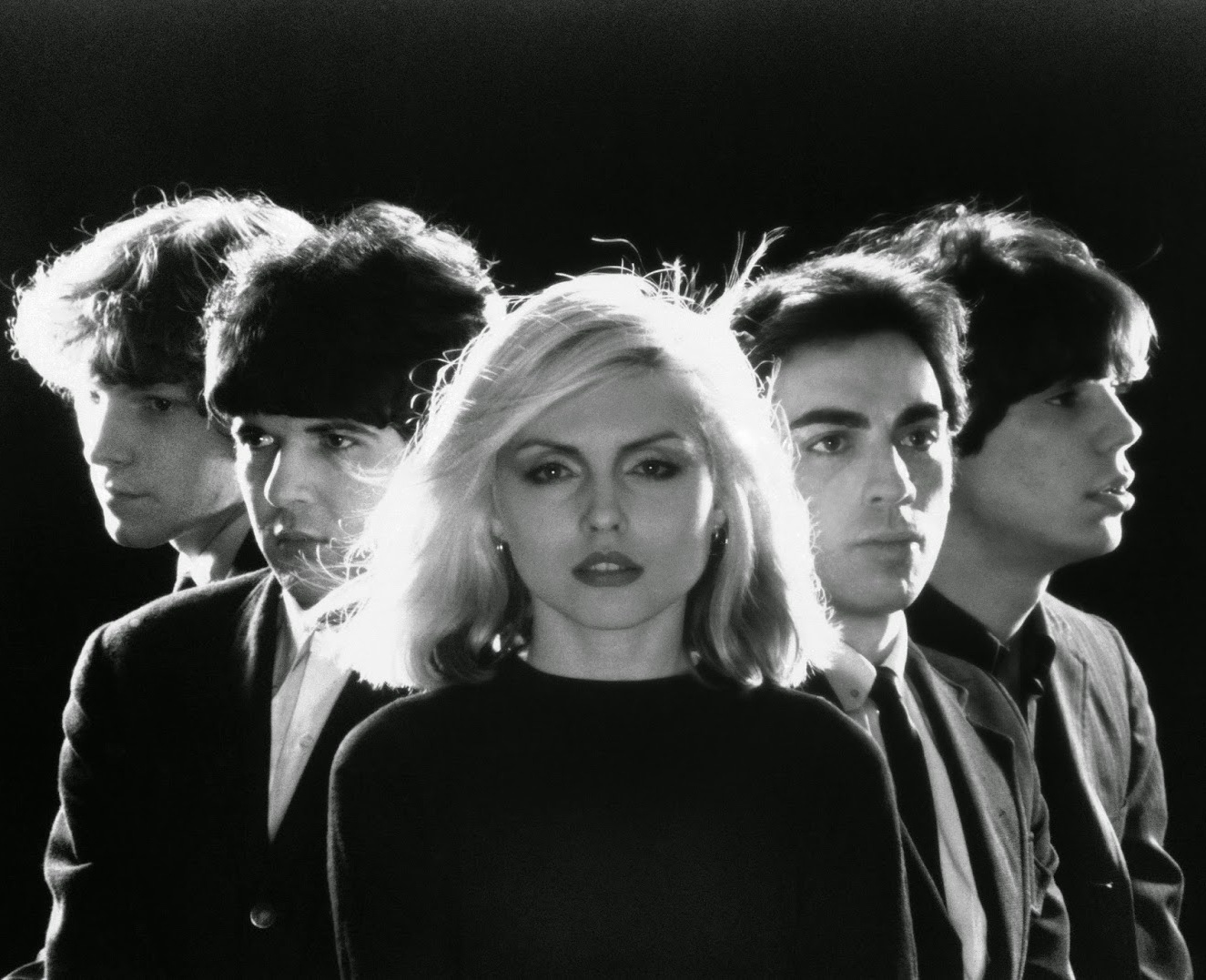
"Call Me" by Blondie was the number one song of 1980.

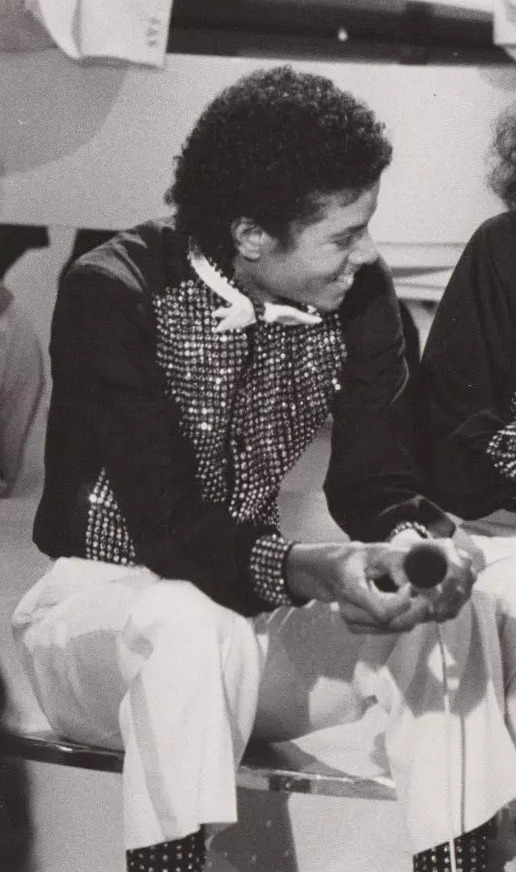
Michael Jackson had three songs on the year-end chart of 1980, including "Rock with You" at number four, "She's Out of My Life" at number 65, and "Off the Wall" at number 79.

This is a list of Billboard magazine's Top Hot 100 songs of 1980.

No.	Title	Artist(s)
1	"Call Me"	Blondie
2	"Another Brick in the Wall, Part II"	Pink Floyd
3	"Magic"	Olivia Newton-John
4	"Rock with You"	Michael Jackson
5	"Do That to Me One More Time"	Captain & Tennille
6	"Crazy Little Thing Called Love"	Queen
7	"Coming Up"	Paul McCartney
8	"Funkytown"	Lipps Inc.
9	"It's Still Rock and Roll to Me"	Billy Joel
10	"The Rose"	Bette Midler
11	"Escape (The Piña Colada Song)"	Rupert Holmes
12	"Cars"	Gary Numan
13	"Cruisin"	Smokey Robinson
14	"Working My Way Back to You/Forgive Me, Girl"	The Spinners
15	"Lost in Love"	Air Supply
16	"Little Jeannie"	Elton John
17	"Ride Like the Wind"	Christopher Cross
18	"Upside Down"	Diana Ross
19	"Please Don't Go"	KC and the Sunshine Band
20	"Babe"	Styx
21	"With You I'm Born Again"	Billy Preston and Syreeta
22	"Shining Star"	The Manhattans
23	"Still"	Commodores
24	"Yes, I'm Ready"	Teri DeSario & KC
25	"Sexy Eyes"	Dr. Hook
26	"Steal Away"	Robbie Dupree
27	"Biggest Part of Me"	Ambrosia
28	"This Is It"	Kenny Loggins
29	"Cupid/I've Loved You for a Long Time"	The Spinners
30	"Let's Get Serious"	Jermaine Jackson
31	"Don't Fall in Love with a Dreamer"	Kenny Rogers & Kim Carnes
32	"Sailing"	Christopher Cross
33	"Longer"	Dan Fogelberg
34	"Coward of the County"	Kenny Rogers
35	"Ladies' Night"	Kool & the Gang
36	"Too Hot"	Kool & the Gang
37	"Take Your Time (Do It Right)"	The S.O.S. Band
38	"No More Tears (Enough Is Enough)"	Barbra Streisand & Donna Summer
39	"More Love"	Kim Carnes
40	"Pop Muzik"	M
41	"Brass in Pocket"	The Pretenders
42	"Special Lady"	Ray, Goodman & Brown
43	"Send One Your Love"	Stevie Wonder
44	"The Second Time Around"	Shalamar
45	"We Don't Talk Anymore"	Cliff Richard
46	"Stomp!"	The Brothers Johnson
47	"Heartache Tonight"	Eagles
48	"Tired of Toein' the Line"	Rocky Burnette
49	"Better Love Next Time"	Dr. Hook
50	"Him"	Rupert Holmes
51	"Against the Wind"	Bob Seger and the Silver Bullet Band
52	"On the Radio"	Donna Summer
53	"Emotional Rescue"	The Rolling Stones
54	"Rise"	Herb Alpert
55	"All Out of Love"	Air Supply
56	"Cool Change"	Little River Band
57	"You're Only Lonely"	JD Souther
58	"Desire"	Andy Gibb
59	"Let My Love Open the Door"	Pete Townshend
60	"Romeo's Tune"	Steve Forbert
61	"Daydream Believer"	Anne Murray
62	"I Can't Tell You Why"	Eagles
63	"Don't Let Go"	Isaac Hayes
64	"Don't Do Me Like That"	Tom Petty and the Heartbreakers
65	"She's Out of My Life"	Michael Jackson
66	"Fame"	Irene Cara
67	"Fire Lake"	Bob Seger and the Silver Bullet Band
68	"How Do I Make You"	Linda Ronstadt
69	"Into the Night"	Benny Mardones
70	"Let Me Love You Tonight"	Pure Prairie League
71	"Misunderstanding"	Genesis
72	"An American Dream"	The Dirt Band
73	"One Fine Day"	Carole King
74	"Dim All the Lights"	Donna Summer
75	"You May Be Right"	Billy Joel
76	"Should've Never Let You Go"	Neil & Dara Sedaka
77	"Pilot of the Airwaves"	Charlie Dore
78	"Hurt So Bad"	Linda Ronstadt
79	"Off the Wall"	Michael Jackson
80	"I Pledge My Love"	Peaches & Herb
81	"The Long Run"	Eagles
82	"Stand by Me"	Mickey Gilley
83	"Heartbreaker"	Pat Benatar
84	"Déjà Vu"	Dionne Warwick
85	"Drivin' My Life Away"	Eddie Rabbitt
86	"Take the Long Way Home"	Supertramp
87	"Sara"	Fleetwood Mac
88	"Wait for Me"	Daryl Hall & John Oates
89	"Jojo"	Boz Scaggs
90	"September Morn"	Neil Diamond
91	"Give Me the Night"	George Benson
92	"Broken Hearted Me"	Anne Murray
93	"You Decorated My Life"	Kenny Rogers
94	"Tusk"	Fleetwood Mac
95	"I Wanna Be Your Lover"	Prince
96	"In America"	Charlie Daniels Band
97	"Breakdown Dead Ahead"	Boz Scaggs
98	"Ships"	Barry Manilow
99	"All Night Long"	Joe Walsh
100	"Refugee"	Tom Petty and the Heartbreakers

== See also ==
- 1980 in music
- Billboard Year-End Hot Soul Singles of 1980
- List of Billboard Hot 100 number-one singles of 1980
- List of Billboard Hot 100 top-ten singles in 1980
