= Billboard Year-End Hot Soul Singles of 1980 =

American music chart

This is a list of Billboard magazine's Top Hot Soul Singles of 1980.

No.	Title	Artist(s)
1	"Let's Get Serious"	Jermaine Jackson
2	"Rock with You"	Michael Jackson
3	"Take Your Time (Do It Right)"	The S.O.S. Band
4	"The Second Time Around"	Shalamar
5	"And the Beat Goes On"	The Whispers
6	"One in a Million You"	Larry Graham
7	"Do You Love What You Feel"	Rufus and Chaka
8	"Don't Say Goodnight (It's Time for Love)"	The Isley Brothers
9	"I Wanna Be Your Lover"	Prince
10	"Ladies' Night"	Kool & the Gang
11	"Cruisin'"	Smokey Robinson
12	"Special Lady"	Ray, Goodman & Brown
13	"Stomp!"	The Brothers Johnson
14	"Shining Star"	The Manhattans
15	"Funkytown"	Lipps Inc.
16	"(Not Just) Knee Deep"	Funkadelic
17	"Give Me the Night"	George Benson
18	"Sweet Sensation"	Stephanie Mills
19	"Upside Down"	Diana Ross
20	"All Night Thing"	The Invisible Man's Band
21	"Too Hot"	Kool & the Gang
22	"Peanut Butter"	Twennynine
23	"Lady"	The Whispers
24	"Just a Touch of Love"	Slave
25	"You and Me"	Rockie Robbins
26	"Haven't You Heard"	Patrice Rushen
27	"I Shoulda Loved Ya"	Narada Michael Walden
28	"Don't Push It Don't Force It"	Leon Haywood
29	"A Lover's Holiday"	Change
30	"Don't Let Go"	Isaac Hayes
31	"Landlord"	Gladys Knight & the Pips
32	"Working My Way Back to You/Forgive Me, Girl"	The Spinners
33	"Still"	Commodores
34	"Gotta Get My Hands on Some (Money)"	Fatback
35	"Bounce, Rock, Skate, Roll"	Vaughan Mason & Crew
36	"Move Your Boogie Body"	Bar-Kays
37	"Two Places at the Same Time"	Raydio
38	"Rapper's Delight"	The Sugarhill Gang
39	"Let Me Be the Clock"	Smokey Robinson
40	"I Call Your Name"	Switch
41	"You Know How to Love Me"	Phyllis Hyman
42	"Dynamite!"	Stacy Lattisaw
43	"You Are My Heaven"	Roberta Flack and Donny Hathaway
44	"Sparkle"	Cameo
45	"I Don't Believe You Want to Get Up and Dance"	The Gap Band
46	"The Breaks"	Kurtis Blow
47	"Glide"	Pleasure
48	"Got to Be Enough"	Con Funk Shun
49	"Welcome Back Home"	The Dramatics
50	"Cupid" / "I've Loved You for a Long Time"	The Spinners

== See also ==
- 1980 in music
- Billboard Year-End Hot 100 singles of 1980
- List of Hot Soul Singles number ones of 1980
