= Shusei Nagaoka =

Japanese illustrator (1936–2015)

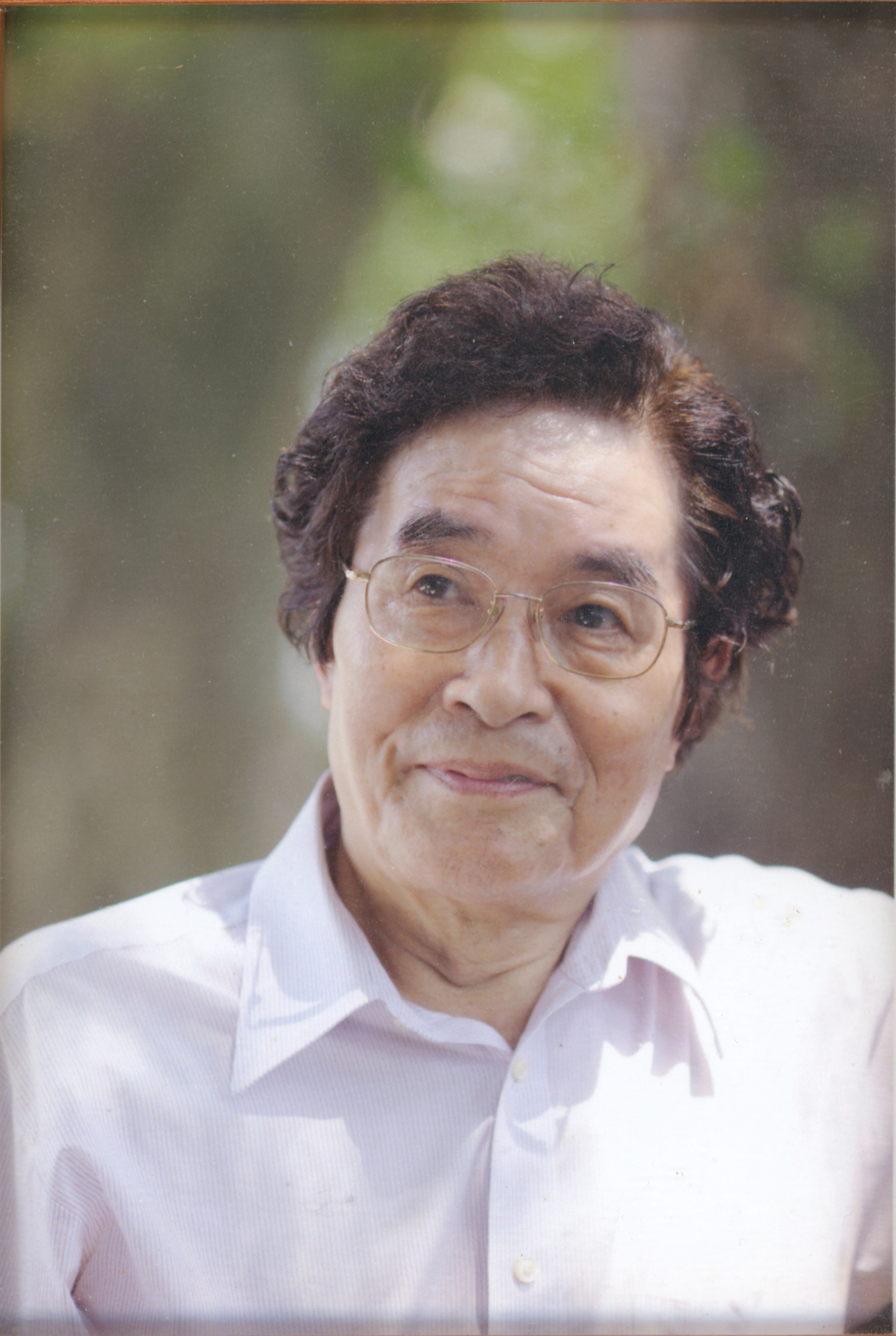
- Born: November 26, 1936; Nagasaki, Nagasaki, Japan
- Died: June 23, 2015 (aged 78); Odawara, Kanagawa, Japan
- Occupations: Illustrator, Graphic Designer
- Spouse: Noriko Nagaoka
- Children: Masashi Nagaoka, Neal Nagaoka

Shusei Nagaoka (長岡秀星, Nagaoka Shūsei; November 26, 1936 – June 23, 2015) was a Japanese illustrator.

== Famous works ==
Nagaoka is best known for his music album cover art in the 1970s and 1980s. Artists for whom he illustrated covers include Electric Light Orchestra, Earth, Wind & Fire, Deep Purple, Space, Maze, George Clinton, Kitaro, Rose Royce, Caldera, and Pure Prairie League.

He assisted in the designing of the 1970 Osaka Expo, and was selected as one of the most significant artists in 200 years of American Illustration.

Several books of his artwork have been published, and in 1981 examples of his work were launched into outer space and orbited via the Russian Mir space station.

Other companies and organizations where his work was featured included: NHK Television, TBS Japan, & National Geographic.

== Awards ==
He received several awards, along with platinum and gold albums, in recognition of his work.

== Selected album artwork ==
- Now & Then - (The Carpenters 5th album), 1973
- Spitfire - Jefferson Starship, 1976
- All 'N All - Earth, Wind & Fire, 1977
- Out of the Blue - Electric Light Orchestra, 1977
- Deliverance - Space, 1977 (US edition)
- Sunbear, Sunbear, Soul Train Records, 1977
- New Horizons - The Sylvers, 1977
- When We Rock, We Rock, and When We Roll, We Roll - Deep Purple, 1978
- The Best of Earth, Wind & Fire, Vol. 1 - Earth, Wind & Fire, 1978
- Pleasure Principle - Parlet, 1978
- Just Blue - Space, 1978
- I Am - Earth, Wind & Fire, 1979
- Dazz - Kinsman Dazz (early incarnation of the Dazz Band), 1979
- Oasis - Kitaro, 1979
- Can't Hold Back - Pure Prairie League, 1979
- Raise! - Earth, Wind & Fire, 1981
- Powerlight - Earth, Wind & Fire, 1983
