= Amie (song) =

Single by Pure Prairie League

from the album Bustin' Out
- B-side: "Memories"
- Released: 1975
- Recorded: June–August 1972
- Studio: Studio A, RCA Toronto
- Genre: Country rock
- Length: 4:18 (album version); 2:37 (single edit)
- Label: RCA 10490
- Songwriter: Craig Fuller
- Producer: Robert Alan Ringe

Pure Prairie League singles chronology
"Amie" (1975)	"Two Lane Highway" (1975)

"Amie" is a song by the American country rock group Pure Prairie League. The song initially appeared on the band's 1972 album, Bustin' Out. It was subsequently released as a single in 1975, after it gained popularity as an album cut.

== History ==
The song was written by the band's co-founder, Craig Fuller, and was originally recorded by the band on their 1972 album Bustin' Out, but was not released as a single until 1975, following a suggestion by critic and Patti Smith Group guitarist Lenny Kaye at an RCA release party after the song gained popularity on college and commercial radio stations as an album cut. Its airplay led RCA Records to re-sign Pure Prairie League after previously dropping them.

== Critical reception ==
In his book Music: What Happened?, musician and music critic Scott Miller described the song as "quintessentially 1972" and "lovely". Mike DeGagne of AllMusic called it "a charming little country-pop tune" and "their most memorable," praising its melody and Craig Fuller's lead vocals. Rock historian John Einarson, citing the song's "lilting harmonies and subtle acoustic playing", called it "a classic of the country rock genre."

== Cover versions ==
The Buffalo Gals covered the song on the 1975 album First Borne.

Double Eagle covered the song on the 1986 album Fire On The Prairie.

Lonestar covered the song on their 1997 album Crazy Nights, and included it as the B-side to the album's single "Say When".

Travis Tritt covered the song on Randy Scruggs' 1998 album Crown of Jewels.

Wesley Willis covered the song to critical acclaim on his 1999 album Greatest Hits Vol. 2.

Singer Brent Anderson included a portion of "Amie" in his 2011 single "Amy's Song", which featured backing vocals from Craig Fuller and Vince Gill.

Counting Crows covered the song on their 2012 album of covers, Underwater Sunshine.

Garth Brooks covered the song on the "Melting Pot" disc of his four-CD boxed set Blame It All on My Roots: Five Decades of Influences, released in 2013.

== Charts ==
Chart (1975)	Peak position
Canada Top Singles (RPM)	40
Canada Pop Music Playlist (RPM)	19
US Adult Contemporary (Billboard)	20
US Billboard Hot 100	27
