= Billy Brown (singer) =

- Brown at BB Kings in New York 2009

Background information
- Born: William Arthur Brown; June 30, 1944 (age 82); Swainsboro, Georgia, United States
- Origin: Asbury Park, New Jersey
- Genres: R&B; soul; pop
- Occupations: Vocalist; songwriter; record producer
- Instrument: Vocals
- Years active: 1962–present
- Labels: MGM Records; Stang Records; Vibration Records; All Platinum Records; Polydor Records; EMI Manhattan Records

Billy Brown (born June 30, 1944) is an American singer, songwriter, and record producer. Brown is an original and current member of the R&B vocal group, Ray, Goodman & Brown A.K.A. The Moments, who had a string of hits during the late 1960s, 1970s and 1980s that included three No. 1 singles on Billboard R&B Chart, "Love on a Two-Way Street", their first RIAA Gold Record and "Look at Me (I'm in Love)", as The Moments and "Special Lady" RIAA Gold, as Ray, Goodman & Brown.

== Early life ==
Brown was born on June 30, 1944, in Swainsboro, Georgia to parents Rev. Arthur L. Brown and Martha Brown. As a young child his family relocated to Northeast and was raised in New Jersey in Farmingdale, where he attended Freehold High School, later moving to Asbury Park. Brown started singing in his father's choir at Friendship Baptist Church in Asbury Park at age four and continued until his teenage years.

== Career ==
=== The Broadways ===
In 1962, Brown along with Ronald Coleman, Leon Trent and Ray Morris started a vocal group, The Uniques and performed locally. By 1966, they changed their name to, The Broadways. The group recorded a demo and sent it to MGM records, a division of Metro-Goldwyn-Mayer Inc. Record executives Charles Koppelman and Donald Rubin liked the sound of The Broadways, and signed them to MGM Records. They recorded the single, "Goin' Goin" Gone" with a 32-piece band. MGM released a second single entitled,"You Just Don't Know" followed by "Sweet and Heavenly Melody", in September 1966. Ray Morris left the group and was replaced by singer Robert Conti. Brown left The Broadways in 1968 to join The Moments.

=== The Moments ===
In 1968, Brown was asked by record executive, Sylvia Robinson who was the co-founder of Stang Records out of Englewood, New Jersey, to join The Moments, and he became their lead singer. The members of The Moments at that time was down to two after former members Mark Greene, Eric Olfus and Richard Gross departed the group, leaving singer and songwriter Al Goodman and John Morgan. Brown joined Goodman and Morgan and in 1969, with Brown on lead, The Moments recorded and released four hit singles, "Sunday" (No. 13 R&B), "I Do" (No. 10 R&B), "I'm So Lost" (No. 43 R&B) and "Lovely Way She Loves" (No. 14 R&B), which Brown co-wrote with Goodman and Robinson.

In 1969, The Moments scored a top 10 R&B hit with their debut album entitled, "Not On The Outside, But Inside Strong" which peaked at No. 8 on Billboard R&B chart. Brown co-wrote the song on the album entitled, "Somebody Loves You Baby".

In 1970, singer Harry Ray joined the group replacing Johnny Moore, who had replaced John Morgan. Between 1970 and 1978, Brown, Goodman and Ray released nine albums and twenty-nine singles (23 charted) that included two No. 1 R&B singles, "Love On A Two-Way Street", and "Look At Me I'm In Love" (No. 3 pop chart).

In 1979, The Moments left Stang Records changing their name to Ray, Goodman & Brown due to the record company owning the name, The Moments.

=== Ray, Goodman & Brown ===
After leaving Stang/All Platinum Records and changing their names, the group signed a recording contract with Polydor Records in 1979, and released their first self-titled album, "Ray, Goodman & Brown" which earned them the No. 2 spot on Billboard R&B chart and No. 17 on the Pop chart. It also became their first RIAA Gold album. The first single from the album entitled, "Special Lady" became a hit song peaking at No. 1 on the R&B chart and No. 5 on the Pop chart. Ray, Goodman & Brown recorded six more albums and fourteen singles between, 1980 and 1988.

On October 1, 1992, Harry Ray died from a fatal stroke at age 45. Long-time background singer for Luther Vandross, Kevin Owens became a member of the group after Ray's death.

Throughout the 1990s, Brown along with, Goodman and Owens continued touring as Ray, Goodman & Brown.

In 2002, they released a new CD entitled, "A Moment With Friends" which included covers of their peers in the industry. In 2023, they released another CD entitled, "Intimate Friends". Brown co-wrote four of the songs. Both CD's were produced by George Kerr and Goodman.

In 2003, they added singer Larry "Ice" Winfree to the group and became a quartet. That same year they were invited by Alicia Keys to back her up on her hit single, "You Don't Know My Name" for a live recording of Sessions@AOL. Keys then took the quartet out with her for live performances that included, The Tonight Show with Jay Leno, The Ellen Show, BET, and Good Morning America

On July 26, 2010, Al Goodman died in the hospital after complication from surgery in Englewood, New Jersey.

After the death of Al Goodman, Brown continued on with Owens and Winfree as a trio.

== Recent years ==
In 2011, Brown reunited with his former group, The Broadways, and performed at the Wonder Bar in Asbury Park, New Jersey. Bruce Springsteen joined them on stage as well.

In September 2016, Brown was honored with a Lifetime Achievement Award by The National R&B Music Society in Philadelphia, PA. Also in that same year, Brown recorded a Christmas song with his former group, The Broadways entitled, "Merry Christmas, Baby Jesus".

Brown suffered a stroke in 2016. He took time off from performing to recover.

In 2019, Ray, Goodman & Brown were booked on The Soul Train Cruise for a performance.

In 2020, Brown along with Ron Coleman of The Broadways, were featured artists in the documentary film, "Streetlight Harmonies", the story of Doo Wop. Other featured artists in the film included, Little Anthony Gourdine and Sammy Strain of The Imperials, Lamont Dozier, Jay and the Americans, Charlie Thomas of The Drifters, Jimmy Merchant of Frankie Lymon & The Teenagers and Jerry Blavat. The film was released on PBS, but now can be seen on TUBI.

In 2022, Brown replaced group members Kevin Owens and Larry Winfree with singers Keenan Blount and Kenny Brown (no relation to Billy Brown).

On April 23, 2023, Brown's long-time friend and former band-mate Ron Coleman of The Broadways died. He was 80 years old.

As of 2023, Brown, continues to performs keeping the legacy of Ray, Goodman & Brown alive.

Brown is scheduled to perform as Ray, Goodman & Brown with his new line-up on the 2024 Soul Train Cruise.

== Discography ==
With The Broadways

- Sweet And Heavenly Melody - 1966
- Goin' Goin' Gone - 1966
- "Are You Telling Me Goodbye" - 1966
- "You Just Don't Know" - 1967

With The Moments and Ray, Goodman & Brown

== Television appearances ==
Soul Train

- January 13, 1973 / season 2 episode 16
- October 6, 1973 / season 3 episode 7
- May 11, 1974 / season 3 episode 31 / The Moments w/Sylvia
- December 7, 1974 / season 4 episode 12
- December 25, 1976 / season 6 episode 19
- May 24, 1980 / Season 9 episode 29
- December 6, 1980 / season 10 episode 12
- April 6, 1985 / season 14 episode 24

American Bandstand

- October 17. 1970 / season 14 episode 7
- March 23, 1974 / Season 17 Episode 29
- March 29, 1980 / Season 23 episode 19

The Merv Griffin Show

- April 16, 1980 / season 17 episode 17

The Mike Douglas Show

- May 7, 1980 / season 18 episode 151

The Midnight Special

- October 24, 1980 / season 9 episode 8

The Toni Tennille Show

- October 27, 1980 / season 1 episode 30

The John Davidson Show

- December 1, 1980 / season 1 episode 110

Showtime at the Apollo

- February 15, 2003 / season 16 episode
