= Conscious (Guy Sebastian album) =

Studio album by Guy Sebastian
- Released: 3 November 2017
- Recorded: 2016–2017
- Genre: Pop; R&B
- Length: 44:15
- Label: Sony Music Australia

Guy Sebastian chronology
Part 1 (2016)	Conscious (2017)	T.R.U.T.H. (2020)

Singles from Conscious
- 1. "High On Me" Released: 1 September 2017; 2. "Bloodstone" Released: 20 October 2017

Conscious is the eighth studio album from Australian singer-songwriter Guy Sebastian. It was released on 3 November 2017. It debuted at number four on the ARIA Chart. With his compilation album Twenty Ten included, it was Sebastian's ninth consecutive top ten album in Australia.

== Reception ==
Professional ratings
Review scores
Source	Rating
Renowned for Sound	3.5/5 stars
auspOp	4/5 stars
Star and Express	7/10 stars

Hayden Benfield from Renowned for Sound praised "the funky guitars and R&B beats" of "High on Me" before saying "With Conscious, Sebastian has sought to move away from his tendency to do take after take in search of the perfect vocal delivery, instead seeking to make it feel “a bit more real”" adding "For an artist who has grown so steadily through his career, Conscious neither represents stagnation or a backward step for Sebastian, but nor does it represent progress.

David from auspOp was complimentary saying it's "one of his best efforts in a long time, the album is a showcase of quality Australian music" praising "Set in Stone", "Vesuvius", "Chasing Lights" and "Sober" adding "Where Guy continues to shine though is on the big mid-tempo numbers."

Leigh Sanders from Star and Express said "[Sebastian's] vocals ... are switching constantly. From deep and booming verses to some pretty high-octave choruses Guy shows that he's not afraid to attack a song from different angles." adding "It's solid if not spectacular."

== Singles ==
"High On Me" was released as the album's lead single on 1 September 2017 and peaked at number 73 on the ARIA Singles Chart.

"Bloodstone" was released as the album's second single on 20 October 2017. It peaked at number 59 on the ARIA Singles Chart, gaining platinum certification in 2019.

=== Promotional singles ===
"Keep Me Coming Back" was released as the first promotional single on 29 September 2017, followed by "Vesuvius" on 6 October 2017, and "Exclusive" on 13 October 2017. "Stay in Bed" was released on 27 October 2017 as the fourth and final promotional single.

== Track listing ==
No.	Title	Writer(s)	Producer(s)	Length
1.	"High On Me"	Guy Sebastian; Louis Schoorl; Fiona Bevan; Mark Landon	M-Phazes	3:17
2.	"Bloodstone"	Sebastian; Thief; Liam Quinn	Sebastian; Jon Hume	3:24
3.	"Set in Stone"	Sebastian; Stuart Crichton; Taylor Parks	M-Phazes	3:41
4.	"Vesuvius"	Sebastian; Sam Sakr; Trey Campbell	Sakr	4:17
5.	"Sober"	Sebastian	Sebastian; Sakr; M-Phazes	3:58
6.	"Drink Driving"	Sebastian; Sarah Aarons; Bastian Langebæk	Langebæk	3:44
7.	"Chasing Lights"	Sebastian; Jussi Ilmari; Nash Overstreet	Sebastian; Jussifer	3:30
8.	"Keep Me Coming Back"	Sebastian; E. Walker; John Newman; Lionel Towers	Sebastian	3:12
9.	"Something"	Sebastian; Matt Gresham	Sebastian	3:08
10.	"Stay in Bed"	Sebastian; Campbell; Maxwell Bidstrup	Bidstrup	3:35
11.	"Exclusive"	Sebastian; Sakr	Sakr	3:56
12.	"Reprise"	Sebastian	Phil Turcio	4:33
Total length:				44:15

Notes

- "Reprise" is a piano/acoustic version of Sober.

== Conscious Tour ==
On 6 September, Sebastian announced the Conscious Tour, saying: "The Conscious album has been a labour of love and to be able to translate it on a live stage is really exciting! The sound of this album has also inspired me to explore different interpretations of previous songs, giving them a new life for 2017."

== Charts ==
=== Weekly charts ===
Chart (2017)	Peak position
Australian Albums (ARIA)	4
New Zealand Heatseeker Albums (RMNZ)	9

=== Year-end charts ===
Year-end chart performance for Conscious
Chart (2017)	Position
Australian Artist Albums (ARIA)	36

== Release history ==
Country	Date	Format	Label	Catalogue
Australia	3 November 2017	Digital download, CD	Sony Music Australia	88985487452
