= Dance (Pure Prairie League album) =

Studio album by Pure Prairie League
- Released: November 1976
- Genre: Country rock
- Length: 33:07
- Label: RCA
- Producer: Alan V. Abrahams, John Boylan

Pure Prairie League chronology
If the Shoe Fits (1976)	Dance (1976)	Just Fly (1978)

Professional ratings
Review scores
Source	Rating
Allmusic	2/5 stars

Dance is the fifth studio album by American country rock band Pure Prairie League, released by RCA Records in 1976.

== Track listing ==
Credits taken from original LP liner notes.

Side One
No.	Title	Writer(s)	Lead Vocals	Length
1.	"Dance"	George Ed Powell	Powell	3:21
2.	"In the Morning"	Larry Goshorn, Tim Goshorn	L. Goshorn	3:02
3.	"All the Way"	D. Loe, R. Perry, Michael Reilly	Reilly	3:43
4.	"Living Each Day"	L. Goshorn	L. Goshorn	2:48
5.	"Fade Away"	L. Goshorn, Reilly	Reilly	4:12

Side Two
No.	Title	Writer(s)	Lead Vocals	Length
6.	"Tornado Warning"	Powell	Powell	3:19
7.	"Catfishin'"	L. Goshorn	L. Goshorn	2:20
8.	"Help Yourself"	L. Goshorn, Reilly	Reilly	3:35
9.	"San Antonio"	Powell	Powell	3:26
10.	"All the Lonesome Cowboys"	T. Goshorn	L. Goshorn	3:21
Total length:				33:07

== Personnel ==
Pure Prairie League

- George Ed Powell - guitar, vocals
- Larry Goshorn - guitar, vocals
- John David Call - steel guitar, banjo, dobro, vocals
- Michael Connor - keyboards (Note: Credited as "Michael O'Connor" on original LP.)
- Michael Reilly - bass, vocals
- William Frank (a.k.a. Billy) Hinds - drums

Additional personnel

- Andy Stein - violin on "In the Morning"
- Charles Veal, Jr. - concertmaster
- Clarence McDonald - horn arrangements
- David Campbell - string arrangements
- Acy Lehman - art direction
- Barney Plotkin - cover illustration

== Production ==
- Producers: Alan V. Abrahams, John Boylan
- Engineer: Richie Schmitt

== Charts ==
Album - Billboard (United States)

Year	Chart	Position
1976	Pop Albums	99
1977	Country Albums	39
