= Bloodstone (comics) =

In comics, Bloodstone may refer to:

- The Bloodstone or the Bloodstone Gem, a Marvel Comics fictional mystical gem from which the Bloodstone family in Marvel derive their name.
  - Bloodstone (Marvel Cinematic Universe), the Marvel Cinematic Universe (MCU) adaptation
- Bloodstone, a fictional family in Marvel Comics:
  - Ulysses Bloodstone, the patriarch of the Bloodstone family who found the Bloodstone
    - Ulysses Bloodstone (Marvel Cinematic Universe), the MCU adaptation
  - Elsa Bloodstone, Ulysses's daughter
    - Elsa Bloodstone (Marvel Cinematic Universe), the MCU adaptation
  - Cullen Bloodstone, Ulysses's son
  - Elise Bloodstone, Elsa's mother
  - Verussa Bloodstone, a character created for the MCU
- "Hunt for the Bloodstone", a 1989 storyline where Captain America searches for the Bloodstone and uncovers Ulysses' body. The series was collected in a trade paperback.
- One of the five pentagonal arranged Bloodstones of the Bloodstone amulet created by Belasco, which was used to open a gateway and release the Elder Gods from their imprisonment.

== See also ==
- Bloodstone (disambiguation)
