= Bustin' Out =

Studio album by Pure Prairie League
- Released: October 1972
- Recorded: RCA Studios, Toronto
- Genres: Country rock, folk rock
- Length: 34:36
- Label: RCA
- Producer: Robert Alan Ringe

Pure Prairie League chronology
Pure Prairie League (1972)	Bustin' Out (1972)	Two Lane Highway (1975)

Singles from Bustin' Out
- 1. "Amie" Released: 1973

Professional ratings
Review scores
Source	Rating
AllMusic	5/5 stars

Bustin' Out is the second studio album by American country rock band Pure Prairie League. Originally released by RCA Records in late 1972, the album garnered renewed interest almost three years after its release. By then, band leader Craig Fuller was no longer in the band due to draft board issues.

"Amie" was first released as a single in 1973 and failed to chart. In early 1975 it again began receiving airplay mostly on college radio stations and then on major U.S. radio stations. It hit #27 by May 1975. On the album, "Falling In and Out of Love" ends in a segue to "Amie", using a lyric that forms part of the chorus of the latter song; in turn, "Amie" concludes with the main chorus of "Falling In and Out of Love." Because of this interrelationship, the pair of songs are sometimes played as a single track.

The album features a guest appearance by Mick Ronson who provided string arrangements on the tracks "Boulder Skies" and "Call Me, Tell Me."

== Track listing ==
All songs written by Craig Fuller, except where noted.

1. "Jazzman" (Ed Holstein) – 2:34
2. "Angel #9" – 4:55
3. "Leave My Heart Alone" (George Powell) – 4:24
4. "Early Morning Riser" – 5:05
5. "Falling In and Out of Love" – 2:12
6. "Amie" – 4:18
7. "Boulder Skies" – 4:01
8. "Angel" – 4:26
9. "Call Me, Tell Me" – 2:41

== Personnel ==
Pure Prairie League

- Craig Fuller – bass guitar, electric guitar, vocals
- George Ed Powell – electric guitar, vocals
- William Frank Hinds – drums

Additional musicians

- Michael Connor – piano, keyboards
- James Rolleston – bass
- Al Brisco – steel guitar
- Mick Ronson – guitar, background vocals, string arrangements
- Dianne Brooks – background vocals on "Leave My Heart Alone"
- Little Bobby Ring[e] – marimba, shaker

Production

- Producer: Robert Alan Ringe
- Engineer: Mark Smith
- Recording Technician: Cub Richardson
- Digital Producer: Susan Ruskin
- Digital Series Executive Producer: Don Wardell
- Remastering: Rick Rowe
- Art direction: Acy Lehman
- Management: Roger Abramson

== Charts ==
Album

Chart (1975)	Peak position
Canada Top Albums/CDs (RPM)	24
US Billboard 200	34

Singles - Billboard Hot 100

Year	Song	Position
1975	Amie	27

== See also ==
- Bustin' Out of L Seven
