= High on Me =

Single by Guy Sebastian

from the album Conscious
- Released: 1 September 2017
- Genre: Pop
- Length: 3:17
- Label: Sony Music Australia
- Songwriters: Guy Sebastian; Louis Schoorl; Fiona Bevan
- Producer: M-Phazes

Guy Sebastian singles chronology
"Mind on You" (2017)	"High on Me" (2017)	"Bloodstone" (2017)

"High on Me" is a song by Australian recording artist Guy Sebastian. It was released on 1 September 2017 as the lead single from Sebastian's eighth studio album, Conscious.

Sebastian said "'High on Me' poured out of me while I was in Bali on a writing trip, sitting back looking at the mountains, high on this life. I really wanted to create a soulful earworm that would make young and old want to get up out of their chair and enjoy the moment."

== Reception ==
In a review of the album, Haydon Benfield of Renowned for Sound said the song has "an infectious sound", "funky guitars and R&B beats".

== Track listing ==
- Digital download
1. "High on Me" – 3:17

== Charts ==
Chart (2017)	Peak position
Australia (ARIA)	73

== Release history ==
Country	Date	Format	Label	Catalogue
Australia	1 September 2017	Digital download	Sony Music Australia	88644668004
