= Firin' Up =

Studio album by Pure Prairie League
- Released: February 1980
- Studio: Sound City Studios, Los Angeles
- Genre: Country rock, country pop
- Length: 35:46
- Label: Casablanca
- Producer: John Ryan

Pure Prairie League chronology
Can't Hold Back (1979)	Firin' Up (1980)	Something in the Night (1981)

Professional ratings
Review scores
Source	Rating
Allmusic	2.5/5 stars

Firin' Up is the eighth studio album by American country rock band Pure Prairie League, released in 1980 (see 1980 in music) on their new label Casablanca. "Let Me Love You Tonight" is the band's biggest pop hit, peaking at number 10 on the Billboard singles chart.

== Track listing ==
All tracks composed by Vince Gill; except where indicated

1. "I'm Almost Ready" - 3:39
2. "Give It Up" (Werner Fritzching, Doug Lubahn) - 3:54
3. "Too Many Heartaches in Paradise" (Dan Greer, Jeff Wilson) - 4:02
4. "She's All Mine" - 2:44
5. "You're My True Love" - 3:10
6. "Let Me Love You Tonight" (Dan Greer, Jeff Wilson, Steve Woodard) - 2:43
7. "I Can't Stop This Feelin'" (Danny Flower, Jim Sanderfur) - 3:34
8. "Lifetime of Nighttime" - 4:54
9. "I'll Be Damned" - 2:42
10. "Janny Lou" - 4:24

== Personnel ==
Pure Prairie League

- Vince Gill - banjo, fiddle, guitar, violin, vocals
- Michael Reilly - bass, vocals
- Jeff Wilson - guitar, vocals
- Michael Connor - keyboards
- Billy Hinds - drums

Additional personnel

- Kristine Arnold - background vocals on "I'll Be Damned"
- Janis Gill - background vocals on "I'll Be Damned"
- Gary Mielke - synthesizer
- David Sanborn - alto saxophone

Production

- Producer - John Ryan
- Engineer - Bill Drescher
- Arranger, orchestrator - David Campbell

== Charts ==
Album - Billboard (United States)

Year	Chart	Position
1980	Pop Albums	37

Singles - Billboard (United States)

Year	Single	Chart	Position
1980	"I'm Almost Ready"	Pop Singles	34
1980	"Let Me Love You Tonight"	Adult Contemporary	1
1980	"Let Me Love You Tonight"	Pop Singles	10
