= Can't Hold Back (Pure Prairie League album) =

- Cover art by Shusei Nagaoka

Studio album by Pure Prairie League
- Released: June 1979
- Recorded: Criteria Recording Studios, Miami, Florida
- Genre: Country rock
- Length: 38:08
- Label: RCA
- Producer: Howard Albert, Ron Albert

Pure Prairie League chronology
Just Fly (1978)	Can't Hold Back (1979)	Firin' Up (1980)

Professional ratings
Review scores
Source	Rating
Allmusic	link

Can't Hold Back is the seventh studio album by American country rock band Pure Prairie League, released by RCA Records. It was the first album to feature future country music star Vince Gill, who had auditioned to replace one of the Goshorn brothers. Gill remained with Pure Prairie League for three albums.

== Track listing ==
1. "Can't Hold Back" (Vince Gill) - 2:44
2. "I Can't Believe" (Gill) - 4:37
3. "Rude Rude Awakening" (Bruce Miller) - 3:52
4. "White Line" (Willie P. Bennett) - 4:25
5. "Misery Train" (Gill) - 4:30
6. "Restless Woman" (Steve Patrick Bolen, Michael Reilly) - 3:48
7. "I'm Goin' Away" (Gill) - 3:03
8. "Jerene" (Gill) - 0:58
9. "Livin' It Alone" (Bolen) - 3:11
10. "Fool Fool" (Max D. Barnes, Jerry McBee, Troy Seals) - 4:00
11. "Goodbye So Long" (Bolen, Reilly) - 3:00

== Personnel ==
- Steve Patrick Bolen - acoustic and electric guitar, vocals
- Michael Connor - synthesizer, keyboards
- Vince Gill - acoustic and electric guitar, banjo, dobro, violin, vocals
- Michael Reilly - bass, vocals
- Billy Hinds - drums

=== Additional personnel ===
- Jimmie Haskell - conductor
- Mike Lewis - conductor
- Tom Roady - percussion
- David Sanborn - alto saxophone

== Production ==
- Producers: Howard Albert, Ron Albert
- Engineers: Pure Prairie League, Don Gehman
- Assistant engineer: Kevin Ryan
- Mixing: Don Gehman
- String arrangements: Jimmie Haskell, Mike Lewis
- Horn arrangements: Mike Lewis
- Artwork: Shusei Nagaoka
- Photography: Nick Sangiamo
- Art Direction & Design: Tim Bryant

== Charts ==
Album - Billboard (United States)

Year	Chart	Position
1979	Pop Albums	124
