= List of Hot Soul Singles number ones of 1980 =

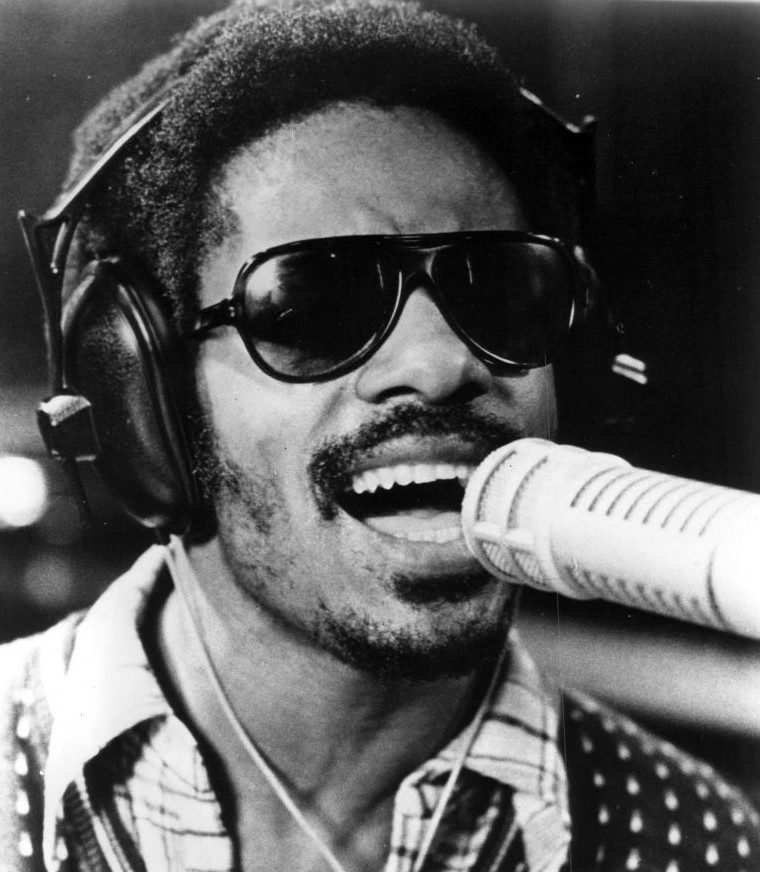
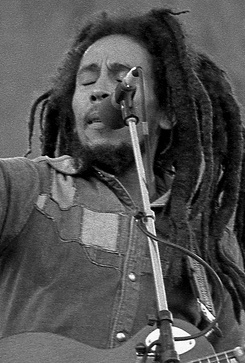
Stevie Wonder (left) had the year's longest-running number one with "Master Blaster (Jammin')", his tribute to singer Bob Marley (right).

Billboard published a weekly chart in 1980 ranking the top-performing singles in the United States in soul music and related African American-oriented genres; the chart has undergone various name changes over the decades to reflect the evolution of black music and since 2005, has been published as Hot R&B/Hip-Hop Songs. In 1980, it was published under the title Hot Soul Singles, and 14 different singles reached number one.

In the issue of Billboard dated January 5, Michael Jackson's "Rock with You" moved up to number one, a position it held for six consecutive weeks; it was the second consecutive single from his breakthrough album, Off the Wall, to reach the peak position. In May, Jackson's brother Jermaine gained his first solo chart-topper with "Let’s Get Serious", which also spent six weeks at number one. Stevie Wonder spent an additional week in the top spot with "Master Blaster (Jammin')", his tribute to reggae singer Bob Marley; its seven weeks atop the chart was the year's longest unbroken run at number one. No act achieved more than one number one during 1980. "Rock With You", "Upside Down" by Diana Ross and "Celebration" by Kool & the Gang topped the soul chart in 1980 and also reached number one on the Hot 100 pop singles chart, although "Celebration" did not reach the peak of the pop listing until the following year.

Five other acts reached the top spot for the first time in 1980, beginning in February with Shalamar. The act assembled by Dick Griffey, booking agent for TV's Soul Train, topped the chart for a single week with "The Second Time Around". The S.O.S. Band reached number one for the first and only time with "Take Your Time (Do It Right) Part 1", which spent five weeks in the top spot. George Benson gained his first chart-topper with "Give Me the Night", five years after he first charted, immediately after which jazz trumpeter Tom Browne reached number one with "Funkin' for Jamaica (N.Y.)", his first single to enter the listing. It was the first of eight singles by Browne to enter the soul chart, none of which entered the Hot 100 at all. Ray, Goodman & Brown reached number one on the soul chart with their first entry under that name, having previously topped the chart in 1970 and 1975 as the Moments. Larry Graham achieved his first solo number one, having spent time in the top spot as a member of Sly & the Family Stone and as the frontman of Graham Central Station. The year's final number one was "Celebration", which first reached the top of the chart in the issue of Billboard dated December 20.

== Chart history ==
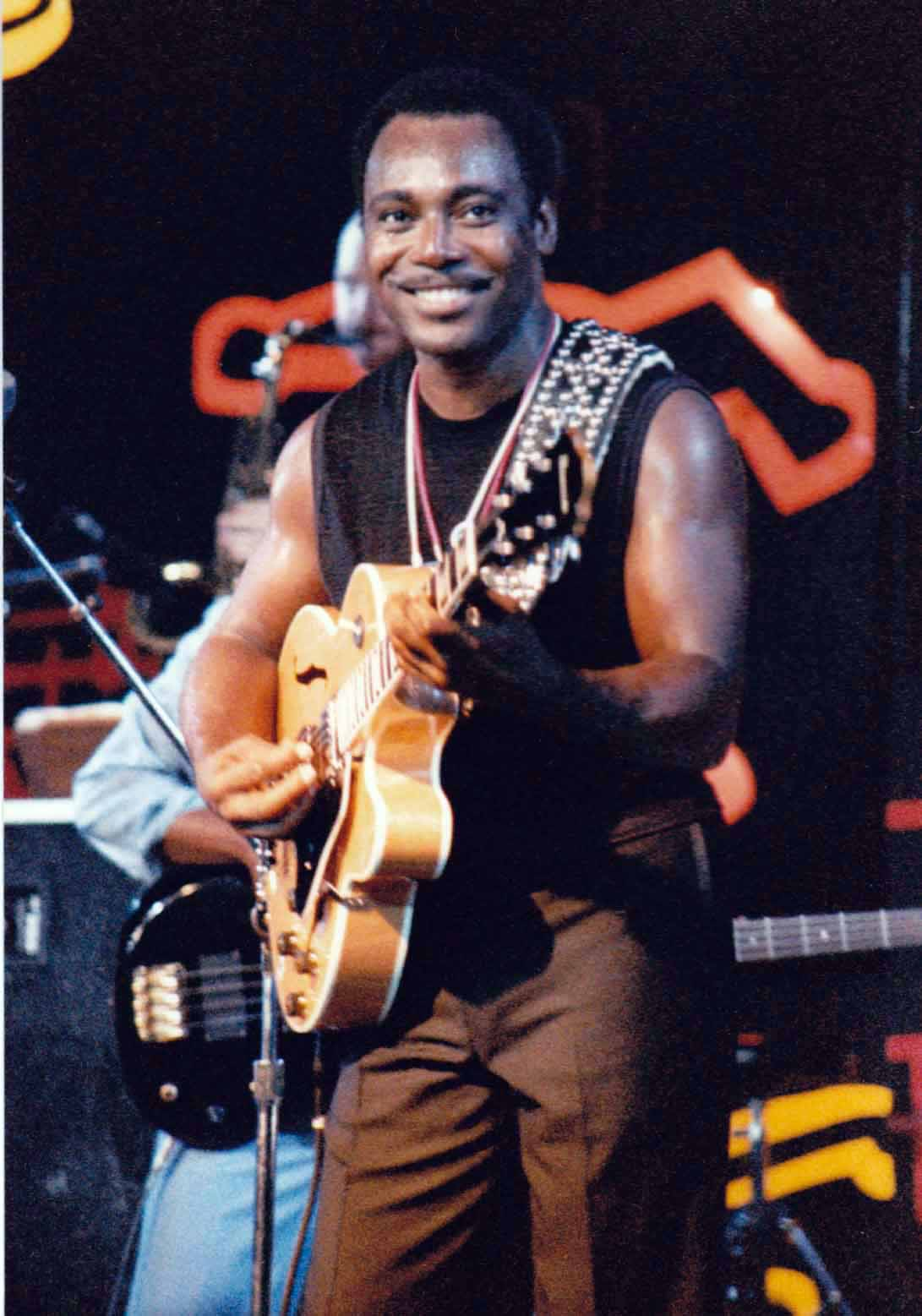
George Benson had his first number one with "Give Me the Night".

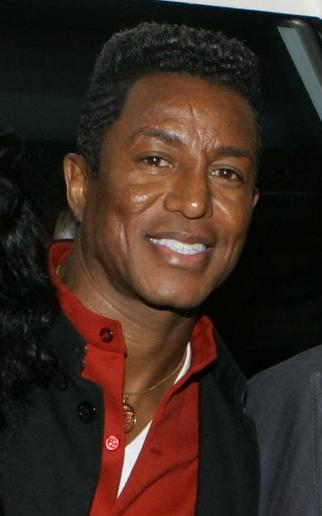
Jermaine Jackson (pictured in later life) spent six weeks at number one with "Let’s Get Serious".

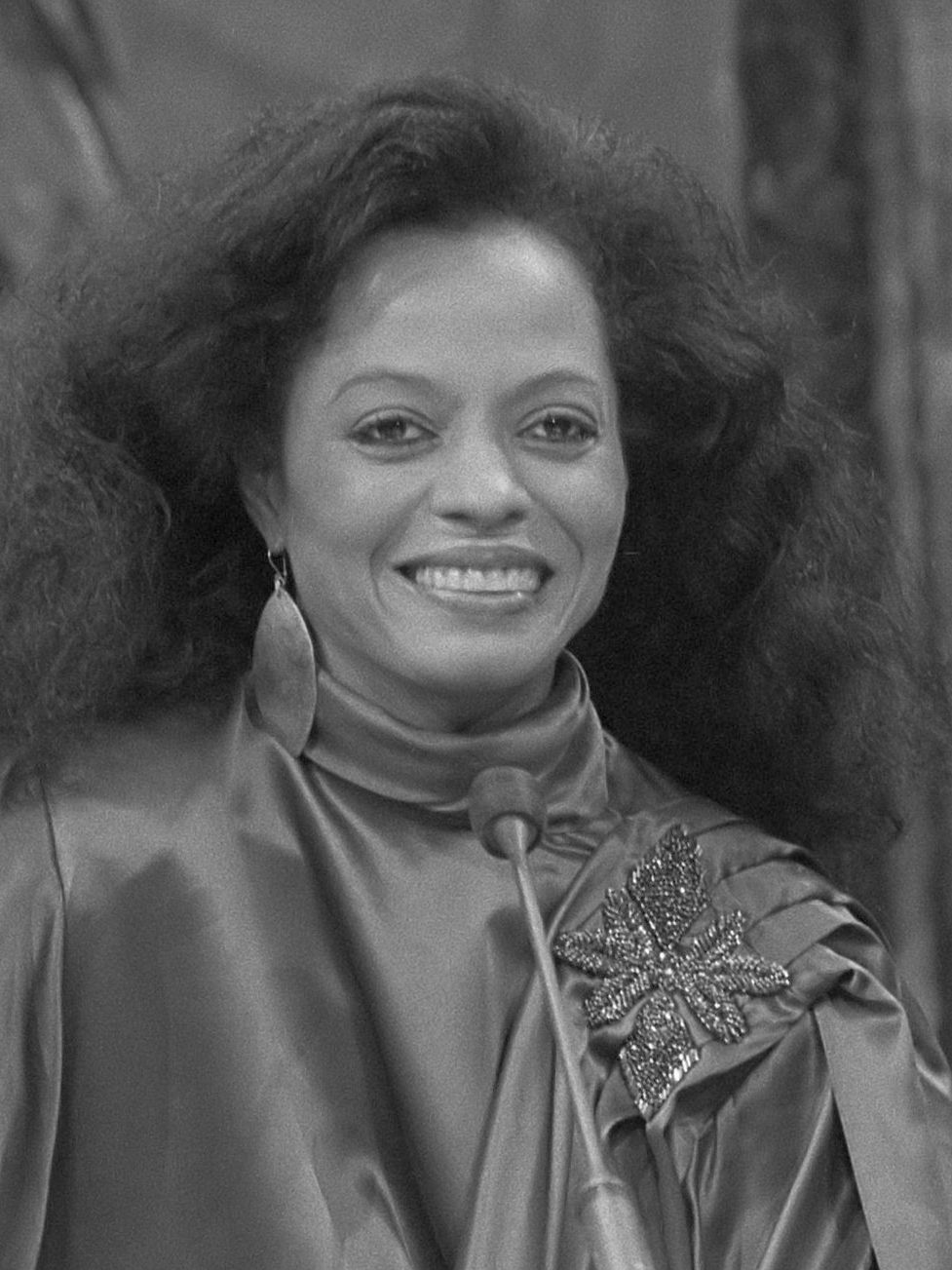
"Upside Down" was a chart-topper for Diana Ross.

Key
†	Indicates number 1 on Billboard's year-end soul chart

Chart history
Issue date	Title	Artist(s)	Ref.
January 5	"Rock with You"	Michael Jackson	
January 12	"Rock with You"	Michael Jackson	
January 19	"Rock with You"	Michael Jackson	
January 26	"Rock with You"	Michael Jackson	
February 2	"Rock with You"	Michael Jackson	
February 9	"Rock with You"	Michael Jackson	
February 16	"The Second Time Around"	Shalamar	
February 23	"Special Lady"	Ray, Goodman & Brown	
March 1	"And The Beat Goes On"	The Whispers	
March 8	"And The Beat Goes On"	The Whispers	
March 15	"And The Beat Goes On"	The Whispers	
March 22	"And The Beat Goes On"	The Whispers	
March 29	"And The Beat Goes On"	The Whispers	
April 5	"Stomp!"	The Brothers Johnson	
April 12	"Stomp!"	The Brothers Johnson	
April 19	"Don't Say Goodnight (It's Time For Love) (Parts 1 & 2)"	The Isley Brothers	
April 26	"Don't Say Goodnight (It's Time For Love) (Parts 1 & 2)"	The Isley Brothers	
May 3	"Don't Say Goodnight (It's Time For Love) (Parts 1 & 2)"	The Isley Brothers	
May 10	"Don't Say Goodnight (It's Time For Love) (Parts 1 & 2)"	The Isley Brothers	
May 17	"Let’s Get Serious" †	Jermaine Jackson	
May 24	"Let’s Get Serious" †	Jermaine Jackson	
May 31	"Let’s Get Serious" †	Jermaine Jackson	
June 7	"Let’s Get Serious" †	Jermaine Jackson	
June 14	"Let’s Get Serious" †	Jermaine Jackson	
June 21	"Let’s Get Serious" †	Jermaine Jackson	
June 28	"Take Your Time (Do It Right) Part 1"	The S.O.S. Band	
July 5	"Take Your Time (Do It Right) Part 1"	The S.O.S. Band	
July 12	"Take Your Time (Do It Right) Part 1"	The S.O.S. Band	
July 19	"Take Your Time (Do It Right) Part 1"	The S.O.S. Band	
July 26	"Take Your Time (Do It Right) Part 1"	The S.O.S. Band	
August 2	"One in a Million You"	Larry Graham	
August 9	"One in a Million You"	Larry Graham	
August 16	"Upside Down"	Diana Ross	
August 23	"Upside Down"	Diana Ross	
August 30	"Upside Down"	Diana Ross	
September 6	"Upside Down"	Diana Ross	
September 13	"Give Me The Night"	George Benson	
September 20	"Give Me The Night"	George Benson	
September 27	"Give Me The Night"	George Benson	
October 4	"Funkin' for Jamaica (N.Y.)"	Tom Browne	
October 11	"Funkin' for Jamaica (N.Y.)"	Tom Browne	
October 18	"Funkin' for Jamaica (N.Y.)"	Tom Browne	
October 25	"Funkin' for Jamaica (N.Y.)"	Tom Browne	
November 1	"Master Blaster (Jammin')"	Stevie Wonder	
November 8	"Master Blaster (Jammin')"	Stevie Wonder	
November 15	"Master Blaster (Jammin')"	Stevie Wonder	
November 22	"Master Blaster (Jammin')"	Stevie Wonder	
November 29	"Master Blaster (Jammin')"	Stevie Wonder	
December 6	"Master Blaster (Jammin')"	Stevie Wonder	
December 13	"Master Blaster (Jammin')"	Stevie Wonder	
December 20	"Celebration"	Kool & The Gang	
December 27	"Celebration"	Kool & The Gang	

== See also ==
- 1980 in music
- Billboard Year-End Hot Soul Singles of 1980
- List of Billboard Hot 100 number ones of 1980
