= If the Shoe Fits =

If The Shoe Fits…

Studio album by Pure Prairie League
- Released: January 1976
- Genre: Country rock
- Length: 33:34
- Label: RCA
- Producer: John Boylan

Pure Prairie League chronology
Two Lane Highway (1975)	If The Shoe Fits… (1976)	Dance (1976)

Professional ratings
Review scores
Source	Rating
AllMusic	2.5/5 stars

If the Shoe Fits is the fourth studio album by American country rock band Pure Prairie League, released in 1976.

In addition to the usual 2-channel stereo version, the album was also released by RCA Records in a 4-channel quadraphonic sound version in 1976.

The album was reissued in 2017 on a hybrid Super Audio CD by Dutton Vocalion. This edition was remastered from the original master tapes and contains both the original stereo and quadraphonic mixes. The disc is a 2 on 1 release, also containing the band's 1975 album "Two Lane Highway".

It was recorded at the Record Plant, Sausalito and Los Angeles and Capitol Studios, Hollywood.

== Track listing ==
Song times and credits from LP.

Side one

1. "That'll Be the Day" (Jerry Allison, Buddy Holly, Norman Petty) - 2:07
2. "I Can Only Think of You" (Larry Goshorn, Michael Reilly) - 2:31
3. "Sun Shone Lightly" (Tim Goshorn) - 3:57
4. "Long Cold Winter" (L. Goshorn, George Ed Powell, Reilly) - 3:14
5. "Lucille Crawfield" (Powell) - 4:09

Side two

1. "Gimme Another Chance" (L. Goshorn) - 3:39
2. "Aren't You Mine" (Billy Hinds, Powell) - 3:41
3. "You Are So Near to Me" (Powell) - 4:28
4. "Out in the Street" (L. Goshorn) - 3:06
5. "Goin' Home" (L. Goshorn) - 3:24

== Personnel ==
Vocals for the album are uncredited on the LP liner notes.

Pure Prairie League

- John David Call - banjo, dobro, steel guitar
- Michael Connor - keyboards
- Larry Goshorn - guitar
- Billy Hinds - drums
- George Ed Powell - guitar
- Michael Reilly - bass

Production

- Producer: John Boylan
- Engineer: Paul Grupp
- Mastered: Wally Traugott

== Charts ==
=== Album ===
Billboard (United States)

Year	Chart	Position
1976	Pop Albums	33

=== Singles ===
Billboard (United States)

Year	Single	Chart	Position
1976	"That'll Be the Day"	Country Singles	96
