= Pure Prairie League (album) =

Studio album by Pure Prairie League
- Released: March 1972
- Recorded: December 1971
- Studio: RCA Victor Studio D, New York
- Genre: Country rock
- Length: 32:52
- Label: RCA
- Producer: Bob Ringe

Pure Prairie League chronology
Pure Prairie League (1972)	Bustin' Out (1972)

Professional ratings
Review scores
Source	Rating
Allmusic	4.5/5 stars

Pure Prairie League is the self-titled debut album by American country rock band Pure Prairie League, released in 1972.

== Track listing ==
1. "Tears" (Craig Fuller) – 2:43
2. "Take It Before You Go" (Fuller) – 4:05
3. "You're Between Me" (Fuller) – 5:35
4. "Woman" (Adam Taylor) – 3:40
5. "Doc's Tune" (George Powell) – 1:22
6. "Country Song" (T. P. Waterhouse) – 7:37
7. "Harmony Song" (Fuller) – 5:20
8. "It's All on Me" (Powell) – 2:30

== Personnel ==
Pure Prairie League

- Craig Fuller – lead guitar, vocals
- George Powell – finger-style guitar, rhythm guitar, vocals
- Jim Lanham – bass guitar, background vocals
- John David Call – steel guitar
- Jim Caughlan – drums

Additional personnel

- Hugh McCracken – guitar
- Barbara Merrick – vocals
- Starr Smith – vocals
- James "Westy" Westermeyer – vocals

=== Production ===
- Producer: Bob Ringe
- Engineer: Gus Mossler
- Cover Art: Norman Rockwell
