= Just Fly =

Studio album by Pure Prairie League
- Released: March 1978
- Genre: Country rock
- Label: RCA
- Producer: Alan V. Abrahams

Pure Prairie League chronology
Dance (1976)	Just Fly (1978)	Can't Hold Back (1979)

Professional ratings
Review scores
Source	Rating
Allmusic	link

Just Fly is the sixth studio album and seventh album overall by American country rock band Pure Prairie League, released by RCA Records in 1978 (see 1978 in music).

== Track listing ==
1. "Place in the Middle" (3:44) - (Larry and Tim Goshorn, Patsy Scanlan (Note: Spelled "Scanlon" on most vinyl copies.))
2. "Slim Pickin's" (3:09) - (George Powell)
3. "Love Will Grow" (3:00) - (T. Goshorn)
4. "You Don't Have to Be Alone" (3:36) - (L. Goshorn, Michael Reilly)
5. "Love Is Falling" (3:07) - (T. Goshorn)
6. "Just Fly" (3:59) - (T. Goshorn)
7. "Lifetime" (2:39) - (L. Goshorn)
8. "Working in the Coal Mine" (3:29) - (Allen Toussaint)
9. "My Young Girl" (3:12) - (George Powell)
10. "Bad Dream" (4:02) - (T. Goshorn, Billy Hinds, Reilly)

== Personnel ==
- Larry Goshorn – guitar, vocals
- Tim Goshorn – guitar, vocals
- George Powell – guitar, vocals
- Michael Reilly – bass, vocals
- Michael Connor – keyboards
- Billy Hinds – drums

== Production ==
- Producer: Alan V. Abrahams

== Charts ==
Album – Billboard (United States)

Year	Chart	Position
1978	Pop Albums	79
