= Bloodstone =

Bloodstone may refer to:

- Heliotrope (mineral) or bloodstone, a form of chalcedony

== Film ==
- Bloodstone (1988 film), an Indian-American action/comedy film
- Bloodstone: Subspecies II, a 1993 horror film

== Gaming ==
- "Bloodstone", a region in at least one of the "Fable" games by Lionhead Studios
- Bloodstone: An Epic Dwarven Tale, a 1993 video game by Mindcraft Software, Inc.
- James Bond 007: Blood Stone, a 2010 video game
- Bloodstone, an item in the video game series Defense of the Ancients
- Bloodstone Lands, a kingdom in the Forgotten Realms Dungeons & Dragons setting

== Music ==
- Bloodstone (band), an R&B, soul and funk band
- Bloodstone (Russell Morris album), 1971
- Bloodstone (Bloodstone album), 1972
- "Bloodstone" (song), by Guy Sebastian, 2017
- "Bloodstone", a 1982 song by Judas Priest from Screaming for Vengeance
- "Bloodstone", a 2007 song by Amon Tobin from Foley Room

== Other uses ==
- Operation Bloodstone, a CIA recruitment program for former Nazi officers and diplomats who could be used in the covert intelligence operations against the Soviet Union
- Ulysses Bloodstone, a Marvel Comics character
  - Elsa Bloodstone, his daughter
  - Cullen Bloodstone, his son
- Bloodstone, a novel by Karl Edward Wagner
- Bloodstone (comics), a set index of comics topics
