= Two Lane Highway =

Studio album by Pure Prairie League
- Released: June 1975
- Recorded: December 18, 1974 – January 23, 1975
- Genre: Country rock
- Length: 32:10
- Label: RCA Records
- Producer: John Boylan

Pure Prairie League chronology
Bustin' Out (1972)	Two Lane Highway (1975)	If the Shoe Fits (1976)

Professional ratings
Review scores
Source	Rating
Allmusic	3/5 stars

Two Lane Highway is the third album by American country rock band Pure Prairie League, released in 1975 (see 1975 in music).

The line-up of the band was drastically changed from their previous albums. It was the first album without founding member Craig Fuller, who was the primary songwriter, and vocalist, on their two previous LP's.

In addition to the usual 2-channel stereo version the album was also released by RCA Records in a 4-channel quadraphonic sound version in 1975.

The album was reissued in 2017 on hybrid Super Audio CD by Dutton Vocalion. This edition was remastered from the original master tapes and contains both the original stereo and quadraphonic mixes. The disc is a 2 on 1 release, also containing the band's 1976 album "If The Shoe Fits".

== Track listing ==
=== Side A ===
1. "Two Lane Highway" (Goshorn) - 4:04
2. "Kentucky Moonshine" (Goshorn) - 2:30
3. "Runner" (Powell) - 2:39
4. "Memories" (Goshorn, Richard Palmer) - 2:52
5. "Kansas City Southern" (Gene Clark) - 2:55

=== Side B ===
1. "Harvest" (Goshorn) - 3:36
2. "Sister's Keeper" (Powell) - 3:45
3. "Just Can't Believe It" (Goshorn, Reilly) - 2:21
4. "Give Us a Rise" (Hinds, Powell) - 2:27
5. "I'll Change Your Flat Tire, Merle" (Nick Gravenites) - 2:09
6. "Pickin' to Beat the Devil" (Tom McGrail) - 2:52

== Personnel ==
Pure Prairie League

- George Ed Powell - guitar, vocals
- Larry Goshorn - guitar, vocals
- John David Call - steel guitar, banjo, dobro, vocals
- Michael Connor - keyboards
- Michael Reilly - bass, vocals
- Billy Hinds - drums

Additional personnel

- Chet Atkins - guitar
- Vincent DeRosa - French horn
- Don Felder - mandolin
- Johnny Gimble - fiddle, violin
- Emmylou Harris - vocals
- Steven Edney - vocals, congas
- John Rotella - clarinet, keyboards
- Sid Sharp - concertmaster

Production

- Producer: John Boylan
- Engineer: Paul Grupp
- Digital producer: Chick Crumpacker
- Digital engineer: Dick Baxter
- Mastering: Wally Traugott
- Orchestration: Jimmie Haskell
- Coordination: Marge Meoli
- Project Director: Paul Williams
- Art direction: Jacqueline Murphy
- Photography: Neil Zlozower

== Charts ==
=== Album ===
Billboard (United States)

Year	Chart	Position
1975	Pop Albums	24

=== Singles ===
Billboard (United States)

Year	Single	Chart	Position
1975	"Two Lane Highway"	Pop Singles	97
