= Something in the Night =

Studio album by Pure Prairie League
- Released: February 1981
- Genre: Country rock
- Length: 33:56
- Label: Casablanca
- Producer: Rob Fraboni

Pure Prairie League chronology
Firin' Up (1980)	Something in the Night (1981)

Professional ratings
Review scores
Source	Rating
AllMusic	2/5 stars

Something in the Night is the ninth studio album by American country rock band Pure Prairie League, released in 1981. The band did not release another album until 2005's All in Good Time.

== Track listing ==
All tracks composed by Vince Gill; except where indicated

1. "Don't Keep Me Hangin'" - 3:45
2. "Love Me Again" - 2:50
3. "Hold on to Our Hearts" - 3:43
4. "Something in the Night" (Dan Greer, Jeff Wilson, Steve Woodard) - 2:41
5. "Do You Love Me Truly, Julie?" - 3:45
6. "You're Mine Tonight" (Rafe Van Hoy) - 3:31
7. "Still Right Here in My Heart" (Dan Greer, Jeff Wilson) - 2:56
8. "I Wanna Know Your Name" - 3:08
9. "Feel the Fire" (Dan Greer, Jeff Wilson, Woodard) - 3:33
10. "Tell Me One More Time" (Dan Greer, Jeff Wilson) - 4:04

== Personnel ==
Pure Prairie League

- Vince Gill - banjo, guitar, violin, vocals
- Jeff Wilson - guitar, vocals
- Michael Reilly - bass, vocals
- Michael Connor - keyboards
- Billy Hinds - drums

Additional personnel

- Kristine Arnold - vocals
- Ricky Fataar - percussion
- Renée Geyer - vocals
- Nicky Hopkins - piano
- Gary Mielke - synthesizer
- Janis Oliver-Gill - vocals
- Mickey Raphael - harmonica
- David Sanborn - saxophone
- Johnny Lee Schell - guitar
- Dick Sims - organ
- Fredrioco Spumani - percussion

== Production ==
- Producer: Rob Fraboni
- Engineer: Terry Becker, Tim Kramer
- Assistant engineer: Steve Gillmor
- Art direction: Tim Bryant
- Design: Jeff Wack
- Photography: Scott Hensel

== Charts ==
Album - Billboard (United States)

Year	Chart	Position
1981	Pop Albums	72

Singles - Billboard (United States)

Year	Single	Chart	Position
1981	"Still Right Here in My Heart"	Adult Contemporary	4
1981	"Still Right Here In My Heart"	Pop Singles	28
1981	"You're Mine Tonight"	Pop Singles	68
