= Let Me Love You Tonight =

Single by Pure Prairie League

from the album Firin' Up
- B-side: "Janny Lou"
- Released: April 27, 1980
- Length: 2:47
- Label: Casablanca
- Songwriters: George Greer, Jeff Wilson, Steve Woodard
- Producer: John Ryan

Pure Prairie League singles chronology
"I'm Almost Ready" (1980)	"Let Me Love You Tonight" (1980)	"Still Right Here in My Heart" (1981)

"Let Me Love You Tonight" is a 1980 song by the American country rock band Pure Prairie League. The lead vocalist for the band at the time was Vince Gill, who would later become a successful country music singer in his own right. Noted saxophonist David Sanborn is also on the track.

== Charts ==
Taken as the first single from their 1980 album, Firin' Up, "Let Me Love You Tonight" became the band's first (and, to date, only) song to enter the top 10 on the Billboard Hot 100 chart, where it peaked at number 10 during the summer of 1980, and remained in the top 40 for 11 weeks. The song also spent three weeks at number one on the Billboard Adult Contemporary chart.

== Chart history ==
=== Weekly charts ===
Chart (1980)	Peak position
Canada Top Singles (RPM)	14
Canada Adult Contemporary (RPM)	1
U.S. Billboard Hot 100	10
U.S. Billboard Adult Contemporary	1

=== Year-end charts ===
Chart (1980)	Position
Canada Top Singles (RPM)	97
US Top Pop Singles (Billboard)	70

== See also ==
- List of number-one adult contemporary singles of 1980 (U.S.)
