= Al Goodman (singer) =

American singer (1943–2010)

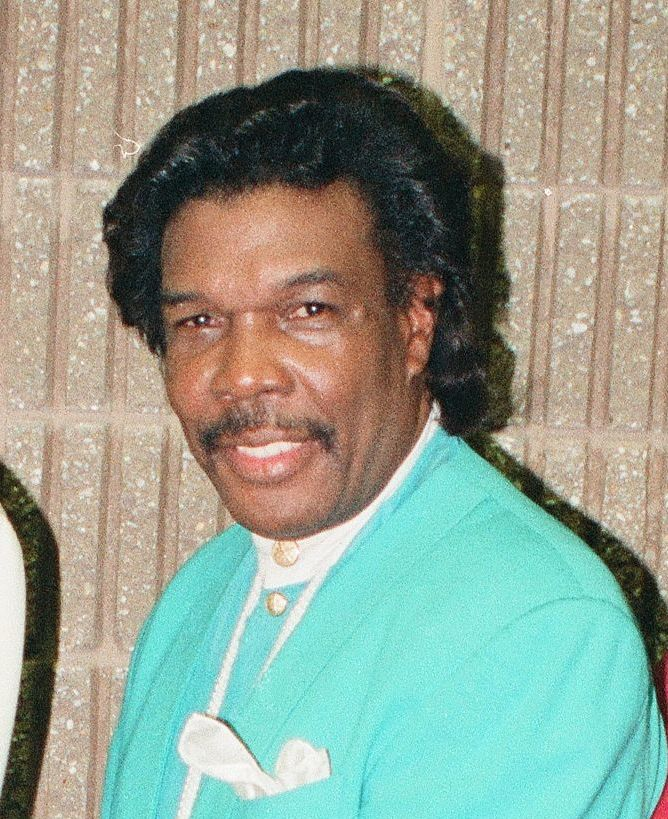
Goodman in 2000

Willie Albert Goodman (March 31, 1943 – July 26, 2010) was an American singer and writer who performed as part of the musical trio Ray, Goodman & Brown, a group that was earlier called The Moments and was known for their songs "Love on a Two-Way Street", "Sexy Mama" and "Look at Me (I'm in Love)" as The Moments and later, "Special Lady" after changing their name to Ray, Goodman and Brown.

== Singing career ==
Goodman was born on March 31, 1943, in Jackson, Mississippi and started singing a cappella doo-wop while he was in high school. He headed to New York City at 19 and got a job with record producer Sylvia Robinson's All Platinum Records at her studio in Englewood, New Jersey, where Robinson first noticed him while he was singing to himself on the job. Robinson revamped the group The Moments on her Stang Records label, teaming Goodman's bass with the falsetto of Billy Brown and sole surviving original member John Morgan after an earlier incarnation of the group scored its first R&B chart hit in 1968. One of their early songs, the ballad "Love On A Two-Way Street" reached number one on the Billboard R&B chart and hit third place on Billboard's pop chart. Months after their first album release, Sylvia's brother-in-law Johnny Moore, a swift replacement for John Morgan, was replaced with Harry Ray. Together, Ray, Goodman and Brown as The Moments went on to record such hits as "All I Have" and "Sexy Mama".

The Moments left Stang Records in 1979, citing creative differences with Joe and Sylvia Robinson, and signed with Polydor Records as Ray, Goodman & Brown, due to Stang Records retaining the rights to the group's original name. With Polydor, the trio scored another chart-topping R&B hit with “Special Lady”, co-written alongside Walter Lee Morris — the group’s guitarist, arranger, and musical director from 1970 through the mid-1980s, who contributed under the pseudonym “Lee Walter” and led All Platinum Records’ in-house studio band The Rimshots. Morris served as Goodman’s primary writing partner across both the Moments and Ray, Goodman & Brown eras; Goodman later described him as “the 4th wheel in our harmonies”, noting he was instrumental in shaping the group’s recordings and vocal backgrounds. ‘‘The Billboard Book of American Singing Groups’’ credited the group as having “left a noticeable mark on contemporary soul music” with 28 songs making the R&B charts and 11 hits on the pop charts. Terry Stewart of the Rock and Roll Hall of Fame and Museum credited them as “one of those transitional tight-harmony love-ballad groups from the ’60s that paved the way out of the doo-wop era to become one of the leaders of R&B for nearly two decades”.

The group recorded many of their songs at the Sugar Hill Records (formerly All Platinum) studio in Englewood, which was gutted by a fire in 2002 that destroyed many of the master tapes of their recordings. Goodman said the fire cost him $500,000 saying "I just stood there and watched 30 or 40 years of my life go by".

A resident of Englewood, New Jersey, Goodman died at age 67 on July 26, 2010, of heart failure after undergoing surgery at Hackensack University Medical Center in Hackensack, New Jersey. He was survived by his second wife, the former Henrietta Young, as well as by two daughters Linda and Rhonda Goodman, three sons James, William, and Brandon Goodman a daughter-in-law Stephanie Goodman and a grandson Aidan Albert Goodman. His earlier marriage to Alice Lewis ended in divorce.
