= Bloodstone (song) =

Single by Guy Sebastian

from the album Conscious
- Released: 20 October 2017
- Genre: Pop
- Length: 3:24
- Label: Sony Music Australia
- Songwriters: Guy Sebastian; Thief; Liam Quinn

Guy Sebastian singles chronology
"High On Me" (2017)	"Bloodstone" (2017)	"Feel Alright" (2017)

"Bloodstone" is a song by Australian singer Guy Sebastian. It was released on 20 October 2017 as the second single from Sebastian's eighth studio album, Conscious. It peaked at number 59 on the Australian Singles Chart, and was certified platinum.

Sebastian told the Herald Sun how a near break-up with wife Jules was the inspiration for the song. He said: "I remember trying to break up with Jules years and years ago, way before kids. Jules was actually like, 'we've got a history and you're just having a down moment, let's just push through it'. Jules was just straight up and said, 'you're an idiot'. In hindsight I was because I would have lost something really special." Sebastian told The Daily Telegraph: "It is about fighting for all sorts of love in all shapes and sizes."

== Reception ==
In a review of the album, Leigh Sanders from Star and Express said: "His range takes on almost Mariah Carey-like changes which are almost just showing off compared to us mere singing mortals."

== Charts ==
Chart (2017)	Peak position
Australia (ARIA)	59

== Certifications ==
Region	Certification	Certified units/sales
Australia (ARIA)	Platinum	70,000^{‡}
^{‡} Sales+streaming figures based on certification alone.

== Release history ==
Country	Date	Format	Label
Australia	20 October 2017	Digital download, streaming	Sony Music Australia
