= Look at Me (I'm in Love) =

"Look at Me (I'm in Love)" is a 1975 single written by Al Goodman, Walter Lee Morris, and Harry Milton Ray, and performed by The Moments. The Moments would later change their name to Ray, Goodman & Brown.

== Background ==
According to the liner notes of The Moments' Greatest Hits album, the song's origins are in a conversation backstage prior to a show. When being teased by members Al Goodman and Billy Brown about the glow he had, Harry Ray responded, "Look at me...I'm in love."

== Chart performance ==
In the United States, the single went to number one on the soul chart for one week and peaked at number thirty-nine on the Billboard Hot 100. Outside the US, Look at Me (I'm in Love)" peaked at number forty-two in the UK and number 56 in Canada.
