= Special Lady =

1980 single by Ray, Goodman & Brown

Single by Ray, Goodman & Brown

from the album Ray, Goodman & Brown
- B-side: "Deja Vu"
- Released: January 1980
- Recorded: 1979
- Genre: R&B
- Length: 3:38 (single version); 4:13 (album version)
- Label: Polydor
- Songwriter(s): Harry Ray, Al Goodman, Lee Walter
- Producer(s): Vincent Castellano

"Special Lady" is a 1980 single by vocal trio Ray, Goodman & Brown, formerly known as The Moments. In the U.S., it was a number one R&B hit and reached number five on the Billboard Hot 100 in 1980. The single marked their first release under the name Ray, Goodman & Brown. The song was written by Harry Ray, Al Goodman and Lee Walter and produced by Vincent Castellano.

== Charts ==
=== Weekly charts ===
Chart (1980)	Peak position
Australia (Kent Music Report)	46
Canada (RPM)	25

=== Year-end charts ===
Year-end chart (1980)	Rank
US Top Pop Singles (Billboard)	42

== See also ==
- List of number-one R&B singles of 1980 (U.S.)
