= Pure Prairie League =

American country rock band

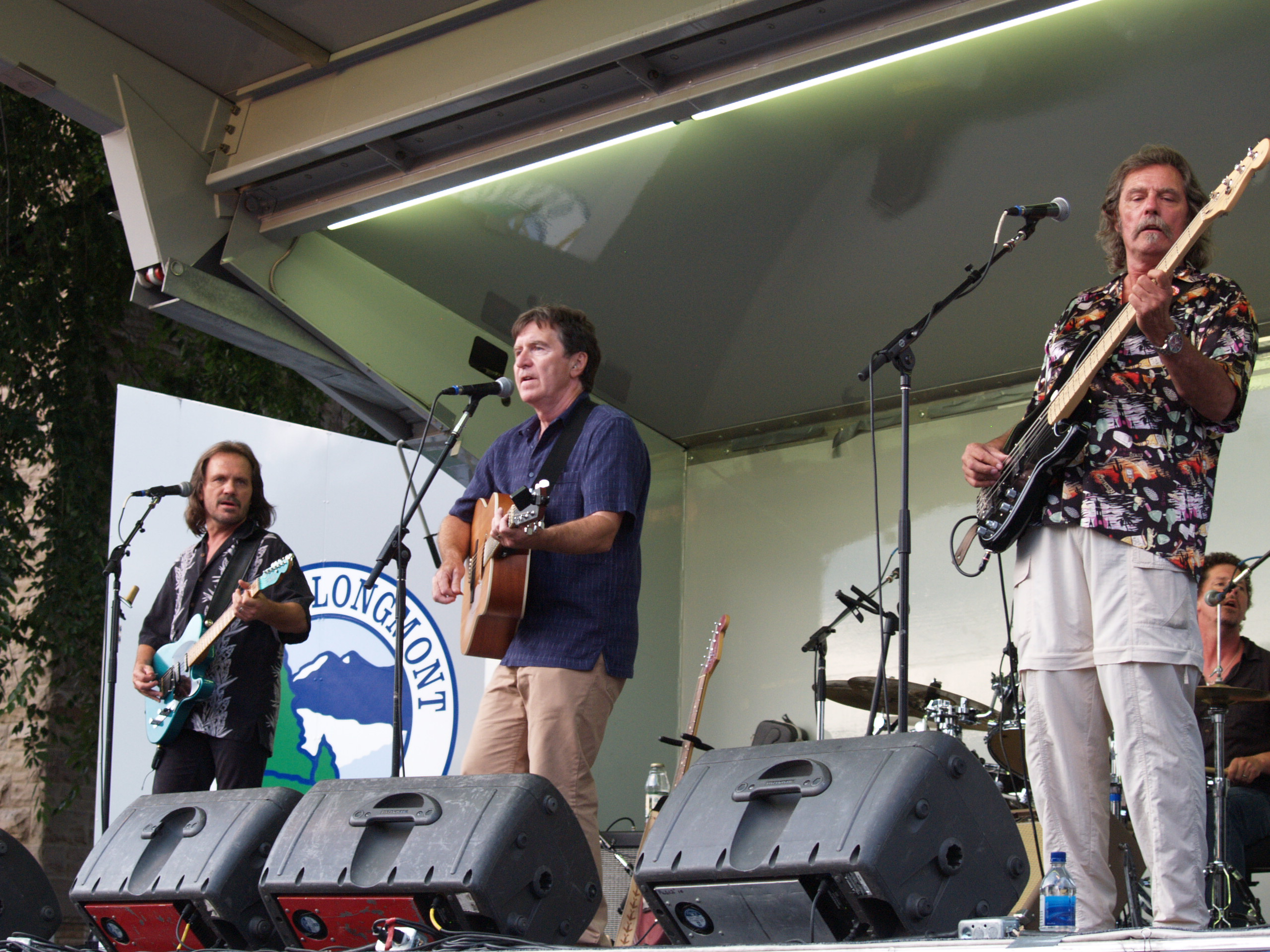
- Pure Prairie League in 2010

Background information
- Origin: Waverly, Ohio, United States
- Genres: Country rock; soft rock
- Years active: 1970–1988; 1998–2002; 2004–present
- Labels: RCA; Casablanca; Thirty Tigers
- Members: John Heinrich; Jared Camic; Jeff Zona; Scott Thompson; Randy Harper
- Past members: See List of members
- Website: pureprairieleague.com

Pure Prairie League is an American country rock band which featured in its original lineup singer and guitarist Craig Fuller, drummer Tom McGrail and steel guitarist John David Call, all from Waverly, Ohio. Fuller started the band in 1970 and McGrail named it after a fictional 19th century temperance union featured in the 1939 Errol Flynn cowboy film Dodge City. In 1975 the band scored its biggest hit with the single "Amie", a track that originally appeared on their 1972 album Bustin' Out. Pure Prairie League scored five consecutive Top 40 LPs in the 1970s and added a sixth in the 1980s. They disbanded in 1988 but regrouped in 1998 and continue to perform. The lineup has been fluid over the years, with no one member having served over the band's entire history. The band's most recent lineup consists of multi-instrumentalist John Heinrich, drummer Scott Thompson, keyboardist/guitarist Randy Harper, guitarist Jeff Zona and bassist Jared Camic. Other notable musicians to have played with Pure Prairie League include guitarists Vince Gill, Gary Burr and Curtis Wright.

== History ==
The band was formed in Columbus, Ohio in 1970 and had its first success in Cincinnati. Craig Fuller, Tom McGrail, Jim Caughlan and John David Call had played together in various bands since high school, notably the Vikings, the Omars, the Sacred Turnips and the Swiss Navy.

In 1970 the first Pure Prairie League line-up was Fuller, McGrail, singer/songwriter/guitarist George Ed Powell (a popular Cincinnati folk singer), Phill Stokes (bassist in Columbus bands Sanhedrin Move and J.D. Blackfoot) and Robin Suskind (a popular guitar teacher in the University of Cincinnati neighborhood) on guitar and mandola, with John David Call joining the band later that year. Call's steel guitar added country credibility to the band's playlist and sparked guitar duels with Fuller that created the signature sound of the band. They rose to popularity as the house band at New Dilly's Pub in the Mt. Adams section of Cincinnati.

In mid-1971, McGrail and Stokes left the band to rehearse with Bill Bartlett, but were unable to put a viable band together. Jim Caughlan, who had played guitar and drums with Fuller, Call and McGrail in earlier bands, took over on drums, and Jim Lanham from California, formerly of The Yellow Payges and Country Funk, replaced Stokes on bass. Suskind departed as well, soon after the arrival of Caughlan and Lanham.

Early on, Pure Prairie League was looking for national artist representation and made contact with rock promoter Roger Abramson, who was based in Cleveland. At the behest of the group's roadie Jim Westermeyer (who had also worked for the James Gang), Abramson saw the band at New Dilly's Pub and later signed them to a management contract. Abramson was able to land them a contract with RCA Records. He then placed Pure Prairie League as an opening act on many of the concerts he produced at that time.

Their self-titled first album used a Norman Rockwell Saturday Evening Post cover, showing a trail-worn cowboy named Sad Luke, who would appear on the cover of every Pure Prairie League recording thereafter. After releasing their debut album (recorded in New York City) in March 1972 and embarking on a nationwide tour, Call, Caughlan and Lanham all left the band.

At that point, Pure Prairie League owed RCA another album and Craig Fuller agreed to make the second record in RCA's Toronto studio with the help of George Ed Powell and Bob Ringe (who had also produced the first album). Al Brisco played pedal steel guitar on the session. Bustin' Out (begun in the summer of 1972) was produced by Ringe and featured the songs of Fuller and Powell. Billy Hinds from Cincinnati joined the band on drums and Hinds's friend, Michael Connor, played piano on most of the sessions and would become a regular in the Pure Prairie League line-up for years to come. Mick Ronson added string arrangements to several tracks, most notably "Boulder Skies" and "Call Me Tell Me". Michael Reilly, who would become the longtime bass player and front man for the band, joined in early September 1972, soon after the record was completed. Bustin' Out was released in October 1972.

Reilly explains how he came to be involved with PPL:

"I was from Fort Thomas, Kentucky, right near the Ohio border. When I was 14 I went out to Sears and bought a Danelectro Silvertone bass, learned how to play it, got a couple of guys together and we formed a band called the Marc IV. We played swim clubs and sock hops and stuff like that back in 1964. Eventually I joined the last incarnation of The Lemon Pipers (of "Green Tambourine" fame). I wasn’t on the original recordings and I wasn’t touring with the original band, but they were from the same area I was from: Oxford, Ohio. As a teenager, I used to play the bars in Oxford every weekend and I knew all the guys who had been in that band. Bill Bartlett was a great guitar player and Dale Brown was the lead singer. I eventually moved to Woodstock, New York and was in a band called the Robert Lee Band with this singer/songwriter from Florida named Robert Lee. Michael Conner and Billy Hinds — the piano player and drummer from Pure Prairie League — were living in Woodstock as well, and we got a chance to record an album in London. “Amie” was recorded in the summer of 1972 and was released around Christmas of ’72 or January of ’73. But we had started touring for that album in September of 1972. The first show I ever played with Pure Prairie League was on Labor Day of ’72 and that was at the Erie Canal Soda Pop Festival in Bull Island, Illinois. Most of the Woodstock lineup, along with 300,000 people, were there, so it was quite a way to start! We signed with a booking agency in Minneapolis called Variety Artists International, and they were one of the biggest college booking agents in the country. So we went out and we started touring at different colleges doing 250–275 shows a year for eight years in a row, or so. That was it — pretty much, it was us jamming “Amie” down every college student’s throat. Plus, lots of kids in college at that time wanted to learn how to play guitar and “Amie” was a pretty easy song for them to learn on, so it became a popular college hit. All the college radio stations started playing it, and then other radio stations were picking it up, too, and then RCA finally perked up and said, “We gotta find these guys and see what’s going on."

Shortly after touring behind Bustin Out, the group returned to Ohio and Fuller had to face trial for charges of draft evasion in Kentucky. He was sentenced to a five year suspended sentence, conditioned on working twenty-four months in a Lexington hospital, and forced to leave Pure Prairie League in February 1973. At this point, RCA dropped the band and their future looked bleak.

By August 1973, the band members were in Cincinnati and managed to persuade Call to return. Fuller was working the late shift in a community hospital to satisfy his C.O. requirements, and was not inclined to rejoin at that time. Reilly took over as the band's leader and front man and brought in his friend Larry Goshorn (vocals, guitars) to replace Fuller in November 1973. Goshorn had played in a popular Ohio band called the Sacred Mushroom.

Pure Prairie League hit the road and began playing gigs constantly, mostly in the Northeast, Midwest, and Southeast. As Reilly related above, as a result of their heavy schedule, particularly at colleges, their songs became well known; "Amie" (Craig Fuller's ode to an on-again/off-again relationship), from the second album, became a particular favorite.

== Success ==
As "Amie" grew in popularity, radio stations began receiving requests for it. As a result, RCA re-released the Bustin' Out and Pure Prairie League albums and re-issued "Amie" as a single. It peaked at No. 27 on April 26, 1975, just as a minor bluegrass revival was underway on mid-western college campuses.

RCA re-signed Pure Prairie League, who relocated to Los Angeles and recorded their third album, Two Lane Highway, which was released in June 1975. It featured guest appearances by Chet Atkins, fiddler Johnny Gimble, Don Felder from The Eagles and Emmylou Harris, who dueted with the band on the song "Just Can't Believe It", which received much airplay on country stations. Highway was the band's highest 'charter' at No. 24, and Bustin' Out reached gold status. And "That'll Be The Day", a cover of the 1957 Buddy Holly & the Crickets hit, was their lone appearance on the Country charts at No. 96 in 1976. This began a string of five consecutive Top 40 album releases, as If the Shoe Fits (January 1976), Dance (November 1976) and Live, Takin' the Stage (September 1977) all made the Top 40.

In 1977 Call left due to health issues. Larry Goshorn's brother, Tim, joined in time to record Just Fly (March 1978). But in 1978 there was a mass exodus as the Goshorns left to form the Goshorn Brothers, and Powell, the last remaining original member, retired from the road to run his farm in Ohio. However, the group soldiered on, as Reilly quickly brought in temporary members, California country rocker Chris Peterson (vocals, guitar) and the group's soundman, Jeff Redefer (guitar), to play a few shows until new, permanent players could be located.

In September 1978 auditions led to the hiring of Vince Gill (vocals, guitars, mandolin, banjo, fiddle). They were not unfamiliar with Gill as, according to band member Michael Reilly, “We had seen him play in 1976 when the band he was playing with opened up for us in Oklahoma City”, remarks Reilly. “We offered him the gig then, but he said, 'Oh no, I’m playing bluegrass'”. The 1978 audition led to an immediate job offer and acceptance.

Further auditions brought in Steven Patrick Bolin (vocals, guitars, flute) in January 1979. This revamped line-up recorded Can't Hold Back (June 1979), which turned out to be their last for RCA. Sax player Jeff Kirk accompanied the band on some of their dates during the 1979 tour.

Casablanca Records, which at this time was trying to play down its reputation as primarily a disco label, signed Pure Prairie League and other non-dance acts to its roster in 1980. In January, guitarist Jeff Wilson came in to replace Bolin, and the band's next release, Firin' Up (February 1980) spawned the hits "Let Me Love You Tonight" and "I'm Almost Ready", both sung by Gill, with saxophone accompaniment by David Sanborn. A second Casablanca release, Something in the Night (February 1981), kept Pure Prairie League on the charts with "Still Right Here in My Heart". However, as fate would have it, Casablanca ultimately went bankrupt and was sold to Polygram Records. Polygram then dropped most of Casablanca's roster, including Pure Prairie League.

Both Gill and Wilson left in early 1982, and Gill pursued a successful solo career before joining The Eagles.

== Later years ==
Despite the lack of a recording contract, the group still found itself in demand as a live act and played in clubs and at outdoor festivals.

Tim Goshorn returned in 1982 and Mike Hamilton (vocals, guitars, from Kenny Loggins' band) also joined the same year and was there for six months (until mid-1982) and joined again in 1987 for touring and for the recording of “Mementos”. Al Garth (vocals, woodwinds, fiddle, keyboards), another Loggins alumnus (Loggins & Messina, also Poco and Nitty Gritty Dirt Band), joined as well, from 1982 to 1985.

Longtime drummer Billy Hinds retired from the road in 1984. He was first succeeded by Merel Bregante (also ex-Loggins & Messina and Nitty Gritty Dirt Band) and then by Joel Rosenblatt (1985–1986) and Steve Speelman (ex-Steele) (1986–1988). Sax player Dan Clawson took over for Garth in 1985 and Gary Burr (vocals, guitars) was a member from 1984 to 1985.

1985 also saw the return of the group's co-founder Craig Fuller (who had fronted the groups American Flyer and Fuller/Kaz in the mid-to-late 1970s, after he had returned to music).

Mementos 1971-1987, which contained re-recordings of their best known material plus four new songs, was released on the small Rushmore label in December 1987 and was recorded back in Ohio, where the band had returned their home base. It featured guest appearances from many of the band's alumni, including Gill, Powell, the Goshorns, Call, Burr, Rosenblatt and Mike Hamilton.

In 1988 the band decided to call it quits. Fuller, who had already joined a reformed Little Feat in 1987, played with Pure Prairie League for their final shows in the spring of 1988.

== Rebirth ==
A decade later (in 1998), Pure Prairie League was back with a line-up of Fuller, Connor, Reilly, Burr, Fats Kaplin (pedal steel guitar, mandolin, banjo, fiddle, accordion, washboard) and Rick Schell (vocals, drums, percussion). After two years, Burr was succeeded by Curtis Wright (vocals, guitars) in June 2000 and the group began work on a new album in 2002, yet abandoned the sessions and separated again after Schell became busy with other projects.

Michael Connor (born December 7, 1949) died after a long battle with cancer on September 2, 2004, at age 54. Following Connor's death, the group resumed touring once again with Fuller, Reilly, Schell, Wright and Kaplin (when available) and released All in Good Time in November 2005. Their first album in 18 years, this release appeared on the small Drifter's Church label.

Since this time, Pure Prairie League has continued to tour, playing a handful of shows every year. Donnie Lee Clark replaced Curtis Wright in late 2006 after Wright joined Reba McEntire's band. Mike Reilly was sidelined in 2006 after he was forced to undergo a liver transplant. Jack Sundrud (from Poco) came in to sub for Reilly. Rick Plant also did a brief stint with them on bass before relocating to Australia in late 2006. Jeff Davis (from Amazing Rhythm Aces) sat in on bass in 2007. In May 2007 Reilly appeared at a few shows and played guitar yet was unable to come back full-time until 2008. John David Call played some concerts in 2006 & 2007, standing in for Kaplin, and returned to the band full-time in June 2010.

As of May 2011, it was announced, via the Pure Prairie League website, that Fuller would not be appearing at all of the band's shows that year, as he decided to take a break from touring. He ended up leaving the group again altogether by 2012. On February 10, 2012 at The Syndicate in Newport, Kentucky, Fuller, his son Patrick, Tommy McGrail, and George Ed Powell (a frequent guest at their Ohio shows in recent years) took to the stage to join the current Pure Prairie League line-up of John David Call, Mike Reilly, Rick Schell and Donnie Lee Clark. In May 2012 Scott Thompson (vocals, drums, percussion) replaced Rick Schell, who departed to continue to grow his real estate business.

Former member Tim Goshorn (born November 27, 1954) died at his home in Williamstown, Kentucky after a bout with cancer on April 15, 2017, at age 62.

In 2018 the group added additional member Randy Harper on vocals, guitar and keyboards.

Tim Goshorn's brother Larry, who had played with Pure Prairie League from 1973 to 1978, also fell victim to cancer and died on September 14, 2021.

In 2021 long time bassist Mike Reilly retired from the road due to health issues and fifteen year veteran Donnie Lee Clark departed as well, paving the way for new members Jared Camic (vocals, bass) and Jeff Zona (vocals, guitar). Reilly did return briefly in February 2022 as a special guest on the Rock Legends Cruise.

In December 2024 Pure Prairie League released Back on Track, their first album in almost two decades.

John David Call retired from the road once again at the close of 2024 and John Heinrich (steel guitars, saxophones), who had played with Ronnie Milsap for many years, joined PPL in early 2025.

The band endorses a number of charitable efforts, Pittsburgh's ongoing BurghSTOCK Concert Series among them.

== Members ==
=== Current ===
- Scott Thompson — vocals, drums, percussion (2011–present)
- Randy Harper - vocals, keyboards, guitar (2018–present)
- Jared Camic - vocals, bass (2021–present)
- Jeff Zona - vocals, guitar (2021–present)
- John Heinrich - steel guitars, saxophones (2025–present)

=== Former ===
- Craig Fuller - vocals, lead guitar, bass (1970–1973, 1985–1988, 1998–2002, 2004–2012)
- Tom McGrail — drums (1970—1971)
- John David Call — pedal steel guitar, banjo, dobro (1970–1972, 1973–1977, 2010–2024; guest 2006–2007)
- George Ed Powell — vocals, rhythm guitar, lead guitar (1970—1978; occasional guest at Ohio shows since 1998)
- Robin Suskind — guitar, mandola (1970–1971)
- Phill Stokes — bass (1970—1971)
- Jim Caughlan — drums, guitar (1971—1972)
- Jim Lanham — bass, backing vocals (1971–1972)
- Billy Hinds — drums, percussion (1972–1984)
- Michael Reilly - vocals, bass, guitar, mandolin (1972–1988, 1998–2021)
- Michael Connor — piano, keyboards, synthesizers (1972–1988, 1998–2004; died 2004)
- Larry Goshorn — vocals, guitars (1973–1978; died 2021)
- Tim Goshorn - vocals, guitar (1977–1978, 1982—1988; died 2017)
- Vince Gill – vocals, guitars, banjo, mandolin, fiddle, violin (1978–1982)
- Steven Patrick Bolin — vocals, guitars, flute (1979–1980)
- Mike Hamilton — vocals, guitars (1982 & 1987)
- Al Garth — vocals, saxophone, woodwinds, fiddle, keyboards (1982—1985)
- Merel Bregante — drums (1984–1985)
- Gary Burr - vocals, guitars (1984–1985, 1998–2000)
- Joel Rosenblatt — drums (1985–1986)
- Dan Clawson — saxophone (1985–1988)
- Steve Speelman — drums (1986–1988)
- Rick Schell - vocals, drums, percussion (1998–2012)
- Jeff Wilson — guitars (1980–1982)
- Fats Kaplin — pedal steel guitar, mandolin, banjo, fiddle, accordion, washboard (1998–2010)
- Curtis Wright - vocals, guitars (2000–2006)
- Donnie Lee Clark - vocals, guitars (2006–2021)

=== Temporary and touring ===
- Chris Peterson — vocals, guitar (1978)
- Jeff Redefer - guitar (1978)
- Jeff Kirk — saxophone (1979)
- Jack Sundrud – bass (2006)
- Rick Plant - bass (2006)
- Jeff Davis – bass (2007)

Timeline

== Discography ==
=== Albums ===
Year	Album	Peak chart positions		
Year	Album	US	US Country	CAN
1972	Pure Prairie League	—	—	—
1972	Bustin' Out	34	—	24
1975	Two Lane Highway	24	—	68
1976	If the Shoe Fits	33	—	89
1976	Dance	99	39	—
1977	Live, Takin' the Stage	68	34	58
1978	Just Fly	79	—	70
1979	Can't Hold Back	124	—	—
1980	Firin' Up	37	—	78
1981	Something in the Night	72	—	—
1987	Mementos 1971-1987 (re-recordings)	—	—	—
1995	Best Of (Casablanca)	—	—	—
1998	Greatest Hits (RCA)	—	—	—
2005	All in Good Time...	—	—	—
2024	Back on Track	—	—	—

=== Singles ===
Year	Single	Peak chart positions					Album
Year	Single	US	US AC	US Country	CAN	CAN AC	Album
1975	"Amie" (released as studio edit in 1975)	27	20	—	40	19	Bustin' Out
1975	"Two Lane Highway"	97	—	—	—	—	Two Lane Highway
1976	"That'll Be the Day"	106	—	96	—	—	If the Shoe Fits
1980	"Let Me Love You Tonight"	10	1	—	14	1	Firin' Up
1980	"I'm Almost Ready"	34	—	—	—	—	Firin' Up
1980	"I Can't Stop the Feelin'"	77	—	—	—	—	Firin' Up
1981	"Still Right Here in My Heart"	28	4	—	—	—	Something in the Night
1981	"You're Mine Tonight"	68	—	—	—	21	Something in the Night
