= Ray, Goodman & Brown =

American R&B vocal group

- Ray, Goodman & Brown promo photo and back cover for "Moments With You" album

Background information
- Also known as: The Moments
- Origin: Washington, D.C., U.S.
- Genres: R&B, soul
- Years active: 1965–1978 (The Moments); 1978–present (Ray, Goodman & Brown)
- Labels: Stang, Polydor, EMI
- Members: Billy Brown; Keenan Blount; Kenny Brown
- Past members: Al Goodman; Harry Ray; Mark Greene; Eric Olfus Sr. Richard Gross; Harold "Eban" Brown; John Morgan; Johnny Moore; Kevin 'Ray' Owens; Larry Winfree

Ray, Goodman & Brown is an American R&B vocal group. The group originated as the Moments, who formed in the mid-1960s and whose greatest successes came in the 1970s with hits including "Love on a Two-Way Street", "Sexy Mama", and "Look at Me (I'm in Love)". In 1978, the then-current members changed the group's name to their surnames- Ray, Goodman & Brown and had further hits, including "Special Lady".

== The original Moments ==
=== Early years ===
The original members of the Moments were Eric Olfus Sr., Richard Gross (often incorrectly listed as "Richard Horsley"), and John Morgan. The Moments formed in Washington, D.C. during the mid-1960s. In 1965, at Washington's Howard University, the Mizell Brothers and Freddie Perren (along with schoolmate Toby Jackson) founded Hog Records and signed the harmony group as the Moments. They recorded "Baby I Want You" and "Pray for Me" for Hog. The lineup consisted of Olfus, Gross, and Morgan.

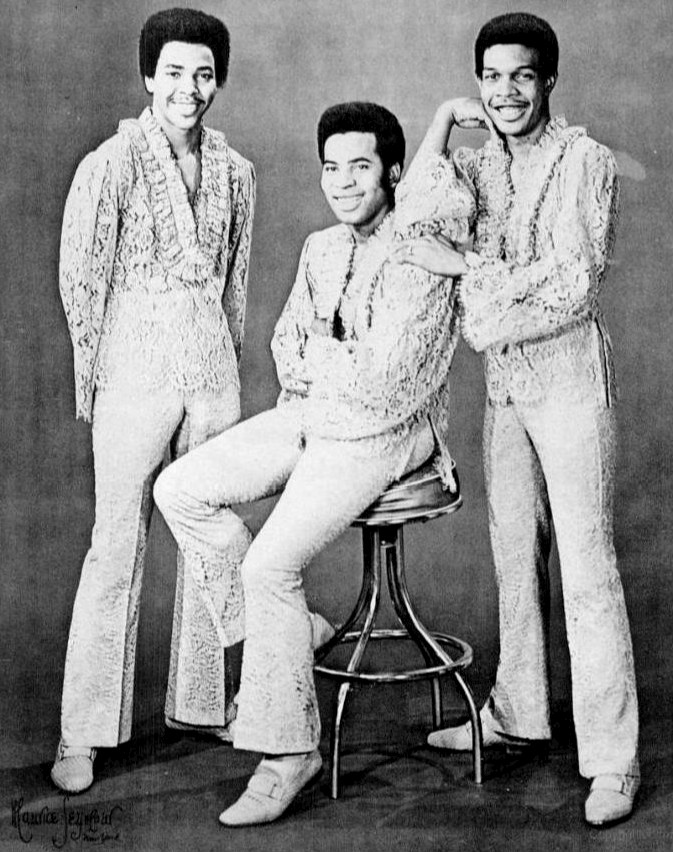
As the Moments in 1970. From left: Johnny 'Moe' Moore, Billy Brown, and Al Goodman.

Mark Greene joined after the single's release. The group then signed with the newly established Stang Records label, set up by Sylvia Robinson at All Platinum Studios in Englewood, New Jersey with her husband Joe. The group had its first hit almost immediately late in 1968 with "Not on the Outside", which reached No. 13 on the R&B chart and No. 57 on the Billboard Hot 100 (with Greene on lead vocal). Robinson then hired a management firm headed by radio stars Frankie Crocker, Herb Hamlett, and Eddie O'Jay. The trio began promoting the Moments and booking them for live events in major cities. When Hamlett moved to WCMF in Rochester, New York, he booked the Moments exclusively. In late 1968, Greene, Olfus, and Gross left All Platinum Records.

== Goodman, Brown & Morgan ==
In 1968, Al Goodman (after a couple of performances with the Corvettes and the Vipers) was hired by Joe Robinson as a studio-production creative assistant, singer, and songwriter. On recordings, he played as a substitute for Mickey of Mickey & Sylvia.

After one live appearance at the Apollo Theater as a quartet, they quickly scaled down to a trio: Morgan stayed on, with baritone Goodman and new lead singer William "Billy" Brown (who had been a member of the Broadways, on MGM).

=== Early hits ===
In 1969, Goodman, Brown, and Morgan released four R&B hit singles with Brown on lead: the first was released in March entitled, "Sunday" (No. 13 R&B and No. 90 Pop); then "I Do", their first top 10 R&B hit, (No. 10 R&B and No. 62 Pop); "I'm So Lost" (No. 43 R&B); and "Lovely Way She Loves" (No. 14 R&B), which was written by Goodman, Brown, and Sylvia.

Their debut album was released in 1969: Not on the Outside, But on the Inside, Strong! appeared on Billboard's R&B Album chart for 22 weeks, peaking at No. 8 on July 4, 1970.

In 1970, the Moments released three top 10 R&B hits that included their biggest hit to date, "Love on a Two Way Street". The song had originally been recorded by Stang artist Lezli Valentine, but failed to chart. The Moments' song entered Billboard's R&B chart on March 28, 1970, appearing for 17 weeks and hitting No. 1 on May 16. It also became a top 5 on the Billboard Hot 100, peaking at No. 3 after 15 weeks.

=== Harry Ray's arrival ===
After the recording of “Love on a Two Way Street” and before it became a hit, Morgan was briefly replaced by Sylvia Robinson’s brother-in-law Johnny Moore (not to be confused with the Drifters singer) in 1970. He appeared with Goodman and Brown on the cover of the group’s second album, but was absent from their live performances. Goodman and Brown worked as a duo until new arrival Harry Ray rounded out the trio that would become the longest line-up as the Moments.

While Brown recovered from vocal overuse, Ray sang lead on the Moments’ subsequent hits including the other two releases of 1970: “If I Didn’t Care” (No. 7 R&B, No. 44 Pop) and “All I Have” (No. 9 R&B, No. 56 Pop). After Brown’s recovery, they released five top 40 R&B hits with Brown and Ray sharing lead vocals, while Goodman served as spokesman for the group. They released their second album in 1970: A Moment with the Moments peaked at No. 39 on the R&B Billboard albums chart on December 12, 1970. Their album On Top was released in 1971; it included the singles “All I Have”, “I Can’t Help It”, “To You with Love” and “Lucky Me”, but didn’t make the album chart.

In 1972, the Moments recorded a live album from a women’s prison entitled Live at the New York State Women’s Prison. It peaked at No. 25 on Billboard's R&B albums chart. They also released two top 40 singles: “Just Because He Wants to Make Love (Doesn’t Mean He Loves You)” (No. 25 R&B) and “My Thing” (No. 19 R&B).

In 1973, they released “Gotta Find a Way” (No. 16 R&B, No. 68 Pop) and another top 10 R&B hit, “Sexy Mama”, written by Goodman, Ray, and S. Robinson (No. 3 R&B, No. 17 Pop). They also recorded a duet with Sylvia Robinson and Ray on lead: “Sho Nuff Boogie” (credited as Sylvia and the Moments).

After a couple more singles, the group hit the top of the R&B chart again in 1975 with the single “Look at Me (I’m in Love)”. The song appeared 19 weeks on Billboard's R&B chart, and hit No. 39 on the Hot 100 on August 9 - 16.

The Moments were co-credited with labelmates the Whatnauts on their hit “Girls (Part 1)”; it reached No. 25 on the Billboard R&B chart and became one of their biggest international successes, reaching No. 3 on the UK Singles Chart in 1975. Central to the group’s sound throughout this era was Walter Lee Morris, who served as their musical director, primary guitarist, and principal arranger from 1970 onward. Morris was simultaneously the bandleader of the Rimshots, All Platinum Records’ in-house studio rhythm section, and co-wrote many of the group’s key recordings alongside Ray and Goodman — most notably “Look at Me (I’m in Love)” (No. 1 R&B, 1975) and “Girls (Part 1)”. Goodman later described Morris as “the 4th wheel in our harmonies”, noting that he was their guitarist and writing partner from 1970 through the mid-1980s and was instrumental in shaping the group’s vocal backgrounds. Ray and Goodman were strongly involved in writing and producing much of the Moments’ material from the mid-1970s, as well as producing and writing for the Whatnauts. The Moments had continued success in the UK scoring two further top-ten hits with “Dolly My Love” (No. 10) and “Jack in the Box” (No. 7).

By 1978, the group had had a total of 27 R&B chart hits and decided to leave Stang, signing with the larger Polydor Records. A legal dispute arose, barring them from using “The Moments” on their new label, so they renamed the group with their last names: Ray, Goodman & Brown.

== Ray, Goodman & Brown ==
The first single under their new name, “Special Lady”, became one of their biggest hits, reaching No. 1 on the R&B chart and No. 5 on the pop chart in early 1980, earning them a gold record. The song was written by Goodman, Ray, and Lee Walter — the songwriting pseudonym of Walter Lee Morris, the group’s guitarist and musical director from 1970 through the mid-1980s and a core member of All Platinum Records’ in-house studio band, the Rimshots. According to AllMusic, Harry Ray brought a partially finished song into the studio, and it was Morris who developed the chord foundation that became the finished track. The B-side featured “Déjà Vu”, with lyrics by Bob Natiello and music by Lou Toby. Their self-titled debut album, Ray, Goodman & Brown, also certified gold, yielded further hits including “Inside of You” (No. 14 R&B, 1980).

In 1982, following the release of their fourth (and final) Polydor album, Harry Ray left to pursue a solo career and was replaced by Kevin "Ray" Owens, a backing vocalist for Luther Vandross. Harry Ray re-joined Sylvia and Joe Robinson at their new venture (Sugar Hill Records), but after one album and a minor hit, "Sweet Baby", he rejoined Goodman and Brown in the mid-1980s in time for their comeback on EMI with the ballad "Take It to the Limit" (which put them back on the R&B chart at No. 8 in 1987). In 1991, Brown's nephew, Harold "Eban" Brown, former vocalist for the Delfonics, became the lead vocalist for Ray, Goodman & Brown. He stayed for two and a half years before joining the Manhattans and became lead vocalist for the Stylistics in 2000.

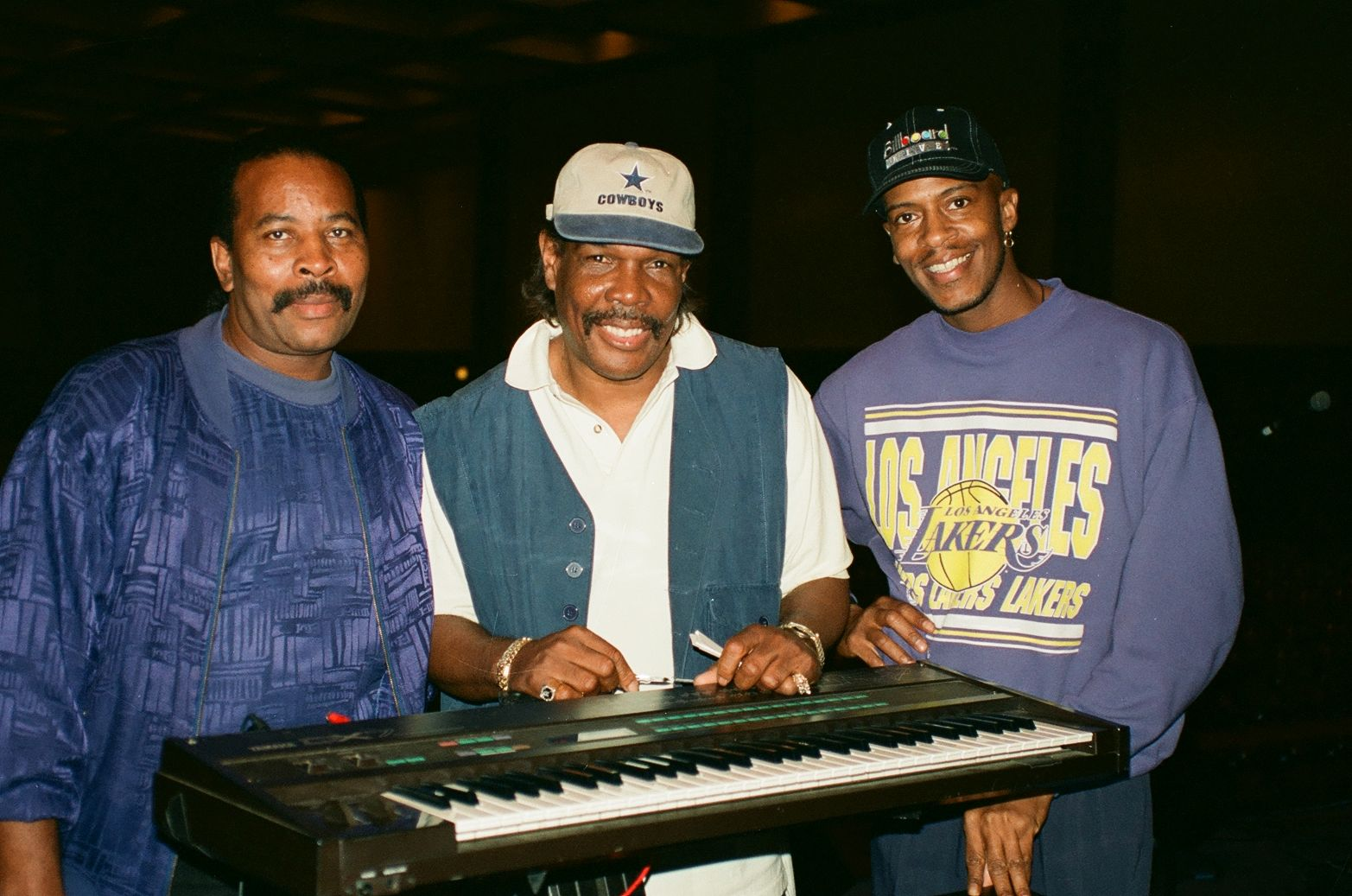
Ray, Goodman & Brown in 1996

=== 1992–2010 ===
Harry Ray suffered a fatal stroke and died on October 1, 1992, at age 45; he was again replaced by Kevin "Ray" Owens. Occasionally solo artist Greg Willis joined Ray, Goodman and Brown in performances (and later on records), but never became a full-time member. Vocalist Wade "Silky" Elliott also did a stint, before signing a solo contract with CBS Records during the 1990s and temporarily joining Blue Magic. With Owens's return, the trio continued to perform and tour as Ray, Goodman & Brown. They released two albums in 2002 and 2003, one with new material, and the other featuring re-workings of soul songs by other male vocal groups. These albums reunited them with former All-Platinum producer George Kerr. In one of their public appearances, they teamed with Gerald Alston to perform The Manhattans' hit "Kiss And Say Goodbye".

In 2003, Goodman, Brown, Owens, and Larry "Ice" Winfree sang backup vocals for the Alicia Keys song "You Don't Know My Name", which was a No. 1 soul/R&B song. Keys was so impressed with their vocals that she took them on tour with her. Recalls Brown: "We did every major TV show in the country — Good Morning America, The View, Jay Leno. When she played Madison Square Garden with Missy Elliott and Beyonce, she had us with her. I gave her the name of 'Our Angel'. She is Ray, Goodman & Brown's angel. She came along when things were kind of slow for us. I love her. I really do."

In 2008, Owens, Goodman, and Brown continued to record together and tour (sometimes with Winfree), performing hits from both the Moments and Ray, Goodman and Brown.

=== Recent years ===
On July 26, 2010, Goodman died at the age of 67.

In 2012, Harold "Eban" Brown rejoined remaining original member Billy Brown to re-record The Moments Greatest Hits - Volume 1. It was released in April 2014 on the Universal Music Group label - featuring the vocals of Harold "Eban" Brown and Billy Brown only.

In 2014, Winfree was officially welcomed into the group as the replacement for Goodman, with Owens and Brown, bringing the group back to its regular trio status.

In 2016, Billy Brown suffered a stroke. Fortunately, after a short absence he fully recovered and continued to perform.

In February 2019, Ray, Goodman & Brown performed on the Soul Train Cruise.

In 2022, Kevin Owens and Larry Winfree were replaced with Keenan Blount and Kenny Brown. Billy Brown continues to perform with the two new members keeping the legacy of Ray, Goodman & Brown alive as the remaining surviving member.

Following the death of the last original member of Bloodstone, Owens and Winfee were invited to perform with the group, now known as 'Bloodstone's Legacy' to keep the group's name alive.

On April 28, 2025, Ray, Goodman & Brown were inducted into The National R&B Music Society's Atlantic City Walk of Fame in Brighton Park. Billy Brown was in attendance and accepted the honor. The Stylistics, Blue Magic, Jean Carne and Phyllis Hyman were also inducted.

== The Moments featuring Mark Greene ==
Mark Greene was called back to join the renamed Ray, Goodman & Brown; however, he declined, claiming that no royalties were ever paid to him. His website displays information about the original group: the founding members, and a photograph of the quartet before Sylvia Robinson reorganized the act. He released a self-produced CD project entitled Love Is More Than Spoken on the FAJR label. There was also a CD release on FAJR entitled Unspoken Moments by the Moments featuring Mark Greene and picturing Greene, Johnny Moore, and Gross (aka Horsley) on the cover. Greene later acquired the trademark for the Moments name. They were thereafter known as "The Moments featuring Mark Greene", and Greene released Urban Legacy in 2000 featuring tracks recorded in 1967 with himself, Solomon Cunningham, Huitt Cunningham, and Loren Brown. This group without Huitt Cunningham were performing and touring with Greene at the beginning of the 21st century.

Greene died in May 2025.

== Television appearances ==
Soul Train

- January 13, 1973 / season 2 episode 16
- October 6, 1973 / season 3 episode 7
- May 11, 1974 / season 3 episode 31 / The Moments w/Sylvia
- December 7, 1974 / season 4 episode 12
- December 25, 1976 / season 6 episode 19
- May 24, 1980 / Season 9 episode 29
- December 6, 1980 / season 10 episode 12
- April 6, 1985 / season 14 episode 24

American Bandstand

- October 17. 1970 / season 14 episode 7
- March 23, 1974 / Season 17 Episode 29
- March 29, 1980 / Season 23 episode 19

The Merv Griffin Show

- April 16, 1980 / season 17 episode 17

The Mike Douglas Show

- May 7, 1980 / season 18 episode 151

The Midnight Special

- October 24, 1980 / season 9 episode 8

The Toni Tennille Show

- October 27, 1980 / season 1 episode 30

The John Davidson Show

- December 1, 1980 / season 1 episode 110

Showtime at the Apollo

- February 15, 2003 / season 16 episode
