= Hypertension (song) =

"Hypertension (Part 1)"

Song by Calender

from the album It's a Monstor
- A-side: "Hypertension (Part 1)"
- B-side: "Hypertension (Part 2)"
- Released: 1975
- Label: Buddah Records BDA 488
- Composer: P. Kyser / L. Stuckey

"Hypertension" was a hit song by New Jersey funk band, Calendar in 1975. It was written by Paul Kyser and Leon Stuckey. Its main success was in the UK where it reached the top ten in the disco chart.

== Background ==
Considered a proto-disco song, it appears on the group's sole album, Its a Monstor. The song was composed by Paul Kyser and Leon Stuckey.

The single was reviewed in the August 2 issue of Record World. The reviewer made a reference to Huey Smith's blood pressure and said that it was heading for the Top 40s heart.

In the US, it was released on Pi Kappa Records PK-608, and Buddah 488. It was released in the UK on All Platinum 6146 308. It was also released in Australia and The Netherlands on Philips 6146 418. In Canada, it was released on All Platinum AP 2359.

Cash Box's Jess Levitt noted in the R&B news report in the August 23 issue that Buddha singles by Gladys Knight & the Pips, Gene McDaniels, Arthur Alexander, Barbara Mason & the Futures and Calendar were rocketing up the charts. Also that week in the UK, it was listed as a Stop Press Breaker by Music Week.

Along with "Shame, Shame, Shame" by Shirley & Co., "7-6-5-4-3-2-1 (Blow Your Whistle)" by The Rimshots, "Sending Out An S.O.S." by Retta Young and "Dolly My Love" by The Moments, "Hypertension" appears on the All Platinum Gold compilation album.

The album that it appears on, Monstor was reviewed by Billboard in the October 23, 1976 issue.

== Chart performance ==
For the week ending July 5, 1975, "Hypertension" was on the Billboard Disco Action chart at no. 12 on the Melody Song Shops (Brooklyn, Queens, Long Island) Retail Sales section.

On August 9, 1975, the single entered the Record Mirror UK Disco Chart. It made it to no. 10, spending a total of four weeks in the chart.

For the week of August 16, "Hypertension" made its debut in the Cash Box Top 100 R&B chart at no. 98. The following week, it had moved up to no. 95. It peaked at no. 94 on August 30, spending a total of four weeks in the chart.

It also made the Billboard Soul chart in 1975.

For the week of 23 August 1975, the single entered the UK Disc Soul Ten chart at no. 10.

== Personnel ==
=== Calendar ===
- Donna Ahjuder
- John Barbee
- Michael Barbee
- Gerald Fair
- Hurlie Arnett Fair
- Stanley Barnett Haygood
- William Jones

== Later years ==
The song backed with "Ritmo Latino" was released on Matasuna Records in 2019.
