= Sending Out An S.O.S. =

Single by Retta Young
- B-side: "Sending Out An S.O.S." (Instr)
- Released: 1975
- Genre: Disco, Soul
- Label: All Platinum AP-2355
- Songwriter(s): D. Lenier; A. Landon
- Producer(s): A. Goodman; H. Ray; W. Morris

Retta Young singles chronology
"Sending Out An S.O.S."	""You Beat Me To The Punch""

"Sending Out An S.O.S." is a 1975 song for singer Retta Young. It charted in the US on the Billboard and Cash Box charts. It charted also in the UK where it did better. It is considered a classic disco song and appears on a multitude of compilations.

== Background ==
In The US, the record was released on All Platinum AP 2355. In Australia, The Netherlands and Germany it was released on the Philips label.

It was written by Allan Landon and Douglas Lenier who wrote "I Love You More Than Ever" which appears on the More than Ever album by Blood, Sweat & Tears.

The single was reviewed by Sue Byrom in the May 3 issue of Record Mirror. She made a note of the S.O.S beeps and their catchiness. She also mentioned what came to mind with this song which was "Then Came You" by Dionne Warwick and The Spinners. Also in that issue Giovanni Dadomo in his Soul Stirrings, Soul Gossip column was referring to it as blockbusting. Young's picture also appeared in the column.

The single was reviewed by Cash Box in the May 31, 1975 issue. The reviewer mentioned the large amount play it was getting at UK discos as well as the local airplay in the US at WNJR-AM in New York. Calling it a free-flowing rhythm track, her sensual vocal and the "super touch" of the Morse Code SOS beeps also were noted.

On the week of June 7, 1975, Dede Dabney in her Record World Soul Truth column had it as one of Dede's Ditties to Watch.

== Airplay (selective) ==
Radio & Records reported in their June 20 issue that Jim Sotet at WABX-FM in Detroit was playing the single. It was also reported by Record World in the June 21 issue that the single was seeing heavy action at WABX-FM.

It was reported by RPM Weekly in the October 4 issue that the single was at no. 71 on Jim Duncan's playlist at CKBC in Bathurst, Canada.

== Chart ==
The record would eventually peak at No. 88 in the U.S. on the Billboard R&B charts and No. 28 in the U.K.

=== US charts ===
Billboard Hot Soul Singles chart

On the week ending, July 19, 1975, the single made its debut at no. 94 in the Billboard Hot Soul Singles Chart. Peaking at no. 88, it hung around for a third week at no. 91.

Billboard Disco Action charts (selective)

For the week ending May 31, 1975, the single was in all four sections of the Disco Action chart. It was at no. 14 in the Top Audience Response Records In N.Y. Discos section, no. 1 in the Downstairs Records (New York) Retail Sales section, no. 12 in the Colony Records (New York) Retail Sales section and no. 15 in the Melody Song Shops (Brooklyn, Queens, Long Island) Retail Sale section.

For the week ending June 14, "Sending Out An S.O.S." was rated No.9 for The Top Audience Response In N.Y. Discos. Other songs in the chart at the time were, "The Hustle" by Van McCoy at no. 3, "El Bimbo" by Bimbo Jet at no. 2, and "Free Man" by South Shore Commission at no. 1. Colony Records had it at No. 7 and Downstairs Records had it at No 1. For the week of June 28, in the Disco Action charts, it was at no. 12 in Top Audience Response Records In N.Y. Discos chart, no 14 in Colony Records (New York) Retail Sales chart, and no. 10 in Melody Song Shops (Brooklyn, Queens, Long Island) Retail Sales chart.

Cash Box Top 100 R&B chart

On August 2, the record made its debut in the Cash Box Top 100 R&B chart at no. 85. It peaked at no. 74 on the week of August 23, spending a total of four weeks in the chart.

Record World Discotheque Hit Parade chart

On the week of June 7, 1975 it was on the Discotheque Hit Parade chart, played by DJ Larry Sanders at the Barefoot Boy in New York.

=== UK charts ===
Main chart

On the week of May 31, the single made its debut in the UK chart at no. 50. It peaked at no. 28 at the end of June, was still in the top 50 on July 12 at no. 44. It spent a total of seven weeks in the chart.

UK Disco Top 20

It peaked at no. 9 on the UK Disco Top 20 on June 28, 1975. It also made no. 10 on Hamilton’s Disco Top 10.

== Appearances ==
Along with "Shame, Shame, Shame" by Shirley & Co., "7-6-5-4-3-2-1 (Blow Your Whistle)" by The Rimshots, "Hypertension by Calender and "Dolly My Love" by The Moments, "Hypertension" appears on the All Platinum Gold compilation album.

According to the Discogs website, "Sending Out an S.O.S. appears on around fifty various artist compilations.

== Other versions ==
The song was also covered by South African artist Jonathan Butler and appeared as the B side of his "I'll Be Home" single which was released on the Bullet label in 1976.
