= Jason Alvarez =

American Christian musician (born 1951)

- Born: Jesús Álvarez; December 28, 1951 (age 74); Havana, Cuba
- Origin: Orange, New Jersey, United States
- Genres: Jesus music, Christian R&B, CCM, worship
- Occupations: Singer, songwriter, worship leader
- Instruments: vocals, acoustic guitar
- Years active: 1974–present
- Labels: Light, Instruments of War
- Formerly of: Shirley & Company, Brother to Brother
- Website: jamm.org

Jason Alvarez (born December 28, 1951, as Jesús Álvarez) is a Cuban-born American Christian musician, worship leader, guitarist, and pastor, who primarily performs Jesus music. He has released eight studio albums and two EPs, during the solo part of his career, mostly on the Instruments of War label or independently.

== Early life ==
Jason Alvarez was born in Havana, Cuba, on December 28, 1951, as Jesús Álvarez. He was raised in Cuba, until 1959, when his mother removed him from church, heading to the U.S. Embassy, where they were placed on a freedom flight. While they got to the United States, Alvarez was reared in Newark, New Jersey around other family members in the slums, for a decade. He was part of the band Brother to Brother, playing shows at clubs, where he came in contact with the woman who would become his wife, Gale. He joined Shirley & Company, after his departure from Brother to Brother where he was their background vocalist, on such hits as "Shame, Shame, Shame", which he and Shirley Goodman (formerly of Shirley & Lee) sang live on The Midnight Special, in 1974. After a suicide attempt, he converted to Christianity at his wife's urging. He went from that moment to become an ordained minister on February 20, 1982, when he and his wife started The Love of Jesus Family Church in Orange, New Jersey, where they now reside. This conversion facilitated Alvarez becoming a Jesus music artist.

== Music career ==
His solo music recording career began in 1981, with the album, Just Give Me Jesus, that was released by Light Records. His next two albums, The Lord Is a Man of War in 1989 and No Turning Back in 1991, were released by Instruments of War Records. The next five albums were all independently released, His Unfailing Love in 2003, All Yours: Live Worship in 2009, Pure Worship in 2012, Intimacy Between Two Just You and God in 2013, and Time for Miracles in 2015. He released two extended plays independently, We Will Glorify in 2007 and Better Than Medicine in 2012.

== Discography ==
=== Albums ===
- Just Give Me Jesus (1981)
- The Lord Is a Man of War (1989)
- No Turning Back (1991)
- His Unfailing Love (2003)
- All Yours: Live Worship (2009)
- Pure Worship (2012)
- Intimacy between Two Just You and God (2013)
- Time for Miracles (2015)
- Brand New (cassette album) (date unknown)
- God Bless You (cassette album) (date unknown)

=== EPs ===
- We Will Glorify (2007)
- Better Than Medicine (2012)
