= IZA (album) =

Iza

Studio album by Izabella Scorupco
- Released: 1991
- Recorded: 1990–1991
- Studio: Soundtrade Studios, Sonet Studios, The Townhouse, Marcus Recording Studios
- Genre: Pop; pop rock
- Label: Virgin
- Producer: Rick Nowels, Ole Evenrude, David Munday

Iza is an album recorded by Izabella Scorupco, featuring (among others), Roxette and Gyllene Tider drummer Micke Andersson.

The album features several covers. "Substitute" is a cover of a 1975 song by The Righteous Brothers that was covered by many performers, among them Swedish 1970s superstars Streaplers in 1978. "Rocks Off" was written by Norwegian singer Aina with two co-writers for her 1988 solo album "Living in a Boy's World". Single and bonus track "Shame Shame Shame" is a cover of a 1974 hit by Shirley & Company while "I Write You a Love Song" is an Ole Evenrude song that was also recorded earlier with different, Swedish lyrics by Leif Bloms and Helene & Gänget.

== Track listing ==
1. "Shame Shame Shame" (Robinson)
2. I Write You a Love Song (Evenrude)
3. Everything to You (Björhovde/Evenrude)
4. You Take Me Up (Axelsson/Damicolas/Bagge)
5. When Passion Rules the Heart (Brandon/Shipley)
6. Red Hot and Blue (Brandon/Briley)
7. Brando Moves (Brandon/Shipley/Nowels)
8. I Know There's Someone Out There (Shipley/Nowels)
9. Rock Off (Olsson/Graf/Fjeld)
10. Substitute (Wilson)
11. If Lovin' You is Wrong (Evenrude)
12. Love Grows (Mason/Macaulay)
13. I Write You a Love Song (12" Remix)
14. Brando Moves (Short Intro Version)
- The song, "Shame Shame Shame", was not part of the initial album release in 1991, but was added to the album in a re-release in 1992.

== Singles ==
Four singles were released from the album:

- "Substitute" (1990)
- "I Write You a Love Song" (1991)
- "Brando Moves" (1991)
- "Shame Shame Shame" (1992)

== Charts ==
| Chart (1991) | Peak position |
|---|---|
| Sweden (Sverigetopplistan) | 11 |
