= Devotion (group) =

- Also known as: The Superbs, The Devotion, Devotion, Retta Young and the Devotions
- Origin: New York, United States
- Genres: R&B, soul
- Years active: 1960s–1970s
- Labels: Symbol Records, J City, Colossus, Silver Dollar, Wanderik Records
- Past members: Rhonda Franklin; Retta Young; Phillis Harris ? Harris; Anita ? Bertha Quince; Madge Quince

Devotion, originally The Superbs, were a female group from New York. Formed in the 1960s, they are remembered for their 1970 hit "Dawning of Love".

== Background ==
They were signed with Colossus Records and released exclusively on Paul Kyser's Silver Dollar label.

Their singles "Dawning of Love" and "So Glad You're Home" (1970) were written by Kyser and co-produced by him and Tom Vetri. "Dawning of Love" became a hit on the US R&B chart, getting to no. 49 in 1970.

== Career ==
=== The Superbs ===
An early line up of the group included former lead singer of The Teardrops, Rhonda Franklin, who joined the group some time around or prior to 1968. Franklin's group had recorded "Wait For Me" backed with "Birdies and Memories" which was on Gossip TKT-2121 in 1964. With Paul Kyser in his first time as a horns and strings arranger, The Superbs recorded "Love's Unpredictable" with Phillis Harris on lead vocals. Kyser co-produced it with Stan R. Krause. The song, backed with "Happiest Girl in the World", was released on Catamount 2122 in 1968. The next single credited to The Superbs was "The Dawning of Love" backed with "So Glad You're Home" on Symbol 8.

The group was photographed for a promotional picture. By the time they were photographed Rhonda Franklin had left the group. Pictured were Phillis Harris, Arnita (surname unknown) and Harris' sister.

=== Devotion ===
"The Dawning of Love" was released a second time by Kyser in 1970 on Colossus C 126 and credited to Devotion. It became a hit and went to no. 49 on the Billboard chart, and no. 41 in the Cash Box chart. According to Kyser in the Music Executive Paul L. Kyser of Trumpet records Sit Down Documentary by Champagne Filmmaker, Kyser and co. went to Cleveland, Ohio and everything was going well, and the girls were set to appear at the Apollo Theater. Unfortunately, the group's lead singer had a medical issue and went to hospital. After that he got a replacement line up. The Devotion line up became Retta Young, Bertha and Madge Quince. They did a show in Baltimore, Maryland. They did a prom there with The Moments. This was where Kyser introduced Al Goodman of The Moments to Henrietta Young. Interestingly, Young, Bertha Addison, and Madge Quince are credited with composing "Stuck To You Like A Magnet" which was registered for copyright in 1968.

The first Devotions recording featuring Young was "The Saga of Will-E Jones" (1971), which was composed by Kyser and Vetri. They were listed in the Campus Attractions section in the March 27 issue of Billboard as an act available for a college date. Record World reported in the August 14, 1971 issue that Silver Dollar Records, having had local success with "Ain't it Good Enough" by New Sound Express Ltd. were getting ready to ship nationally the single by a dynamite female group, the Devotions. The single, "The Saga of Will-E Jones" was the first Jamie / Guyden release on the Silver Dollar label.

In the March 17, 1973 issue of Record World, Dede Dabney in her Soul Truth column had "So Glad You're Home" as one of Dede's Ditties to Watch.

- Note: "The Saga of Will-E Jones" 1971 release and info by Kyser suggests that Retta Young did not sing on earlier recordings such as "The Dawning of Love."

== Later years ==
Retta Young went solo and had a hit with "Sending Out An S.O.S.". The record would eventually peak at No. 88 in the U.S. on the Billboard R&B charts and No. 28 in the U.K.

=== Discography ===
Singles (1968)
Act	Release	Catalogue	Year	Format	Notes
The Superbs	"Love's Unpredictable" / "Happiest Girl In The World"	Catamount 2122	1968	7" single	

Singles (1970s to 2000s)
Act	Title	Release info	Year	Format	Notes
The Superbs	"The Dawning Of Love" / "So Glad You're Home"	Symbol Records SYMBOL 8	1969	7" single	
The Devotions	"So Glad You're Home" / "The Dawning Of Love"	J City JC-325	1970	7" single	
Devotion	"Dawning of Love" / "So Glad You're Home"	Polydor Records 2058 071	1970	7" single	UK release
Devotion	"Dawning of Love" / "So Glad You're Home"	Colossus Records	1970	7" single	
The Devotions	"The Saga Of Will-E Jones" / "Let's Join Our World Together"	Silver Dollar SD-154	1971	7" single	
Retta Young and the Devotions	"So Glad You're Home" / "The Dawning of Love"	Essential Media Group	2014	CD-R + Digital 45	

Albums
Title	Release info	Year	Format	Notes
Retta Young and the Devotions	Wanderik Records	1977	LP	
Retta Young and the Devotions	Wanderik Records	2011	MP3 album	
Retta Young and the Devotions (digitally remastered)	Essential Media Group	2013	CD-R	
