= Retta Young =

American singer

- Also known as: Rhetta Young; Reeta Young; Henrietta Goodman
- Born: Henrietta Young; South Carolina, U.S.
- Occupation: Singer
- Years active: 1960s - 1970s
- Label: All Platinum
- Formerly of: Devotion, Retta Young & the Devotions

Retta Young (born 1949) is an American former singer best known for her 1975 disco hit "Sending Out An S.O.S." which made the Billboard Hot Soul Singles, Cash Box Top 100 R&B and UK Top 30 charts. She released an album and three singles during the 1970s.

== Background ==
Retta Young was signed to the All Platinum record label which produced hits for herself, The Moments and Sylvia. The relationship with Phonogram in the UK proved fruitful for the label and the artists. She was backed by The Moments during her Platinum Records period.

She did some reception work for the label. It was in 1975 that she found success with a her hit, "Sending Out An S.O.S." which registered on multiple charts in both the US and UK.

She is credited as a composer for the songs "Hey Sad Boy", "Love & Affection", "Set My Heart from Misery" and "Stuck to You Like a Magnet".

== Early career ==
A song "Stuck To You Like a Magnet" was registered for copyright in 1968. Henrietta Young, Bertha Addison, and Madge Quince are the credited composers.

=== Devotions period ===
By the early 1970s, Young was a member of the vocal group Devotion. The group had started out being called The Superbs and Rhonda Franklin from The Teardrops who in 1964 recorded "Wait For Me" bw "Birdies and Memories" (Gossip TKT-2121) was a member. Phillis Harris was also a member. At some stage Rhonda Franklin left and the group eventually recorded "The Dawning of Love" backed with "So Glad You're Home", released on Symbol 8.

The song was released a second time by Paul Kyser in 1970 on Colossus C 126 and credited to Devotion. It became a hit and went to no. 49 on the Billboard chart, and no. 41 in the Cash Box chart. According to Kyser in the Music Executive Paul L. Kyser of Trumpet records Sit Down Documentary by Champagne Filmmaker, Kyser and co. went to Cleveland, Ohio and everything was going well, and the girls were set to appear at the Apollo Theater. Unfortunately, the group's lead singer had a medical issue and went to hospital. After that he got a replacement line up. The Devotion line up then became Retta Young, Bertha and Madge Quince.

It's likely that first Devotions recording featuring Young was "The Saga of Will-E Jones" (1971), which was composed by Kyser and Vetri.

== Career (solo) ==
=== 1970s ===
Hit single period

"Sending Out An S.O.S." was released on the All Platinum label in 1975 It was produced by Al Goodman and Harry Ray of The Moments.

On the week of June 14, the record was registering in three sections of the Billboard Disco Action chart. The song was ranked #9 on the Top Audience Response in New York discos. Downstairs Records and Colony Records (both of them New York record stores) ranked the song's retail sales at #1 and #7, respectively. Also on that week it was in the Record World Disco Parade chart, on the Le Cocu, New York list.

The June 28 issue of Billboard noted that Young and fiancé Al Goodman were in London on a promotional visit. While there she performed "Sending Out An S.O.S." on the Top of the Pops show which was broadcast on June 19.

The song would eventually peak at no. 88 on the Billboard's Hot Soul Singles chart, no. 74 on the Cash Box Top 100 R&B chart, and number #28 on the UK Singles Chart. It also made the Disco chart.

Further activities

It was announced in the October 4 issue of Record Mirror & Disc that Young with the other All Platinum acts, The Moments, Shirley & Co. etc. were set to tour the UK with the opening show at the Liverpool Empire on November 9. There were also around nine other engagements including the Hammersmith Odeon, running through to November 20.

In the October 18 issue, Billboard announced that The Rimshots, Chuck Jackson, Shirley and Co., Young were set to perform in Belgium in late November 1975.

In 1975 / 1976, the exploitation film Patty was released. Directed by Robert L. Roberts, it contained music by Al Goodman, featuring The Moments, Chuck Jackson, Retta Young, and The Rimshots. Young's contribution to the film's soundtrack was "Look at Me". It is loosely based on the kidnapping of Patty Hearst.

Young and Tommy Keith provided the backing vocals on Chuck Jackson's Needing You Wanting You album that was released in late 1975. Produced by Al Goodman, Harry Ray and Walter Morris, it was released on the All Platinum label.

For the week of March 26, 1977, Young's record album was played on Rod McGrew's show at KJLH in Los Angeles.

Her single, "My Man Is on His Way" and "Really, Really" were released in 1978.

=== Later years ===
"That's How Some Men Are" from her Young and Restless album was sampled by Chief Kamachi for the 2004 song, "Queen".

"My Man Is on His Way" appears on Soul Jazz Records' compilation album Disco: A Fine Selection of Independent Disco, Modern Soul and Boogie 1978-82. The song would also find popularity on the Northern Soul scene.

Young's album Young and Restless was re-released by Expansion Records in 2017 on both vinyl LP and CD. The CD version includes bonus non-album tracks.

== Personal life ==
Young was married to Ray, Goodman & Brown member Al Goodman, who died in Hackensack, New Jersey on 26 July 2010. She was initially introduced to Goodman by Paul Kyser.

== Discography ==
Singles
Title	Release info	Year	Format	Notes
"(Sending Out An) S.O.S." / "(Sending Out An) S.O.S." (Instrumental)	All Platinum AP 2355	1975	7"	
"You Beat Me To The Punch" / "Maybe It's The Best Thing"	All Platinum AP-2361	1975	7"	
"My Man Is On His Way" / "Really, Really"	All Platinum AP 2375	1978	7"	

Albums
Title	Release info	Year	Format	Notes
Young And Restless	All Platinum AP-3017	1976	LP	
Young And Restless	Expansion EXLPM 61	2017	LP	
Young And Restless	Expansion EXCDM 61	2017	CD	
