= Paul Kyser =

American songwriter

- Also known as: Paul L. Kyser, Paul L. Keiser, Paul Keiser
- Born: December 6, 1943 (age 82); New Jersey, USA
- Occupations: Record producer, record label executive
- Labels: Pi Kappa Records, Silver Dollar Records, Trumpet Records

Paul Kyser (born December 6, 1943) is an American promoter, record label owner, singer, songwriter, record producer and arranger. He wrote and co-produced the hit "Dawning of Love" with Tom Vetri for Devotion. He also wrote "Body and Soul (That's the Way It's Got to Be)" for the group Soul Generation and "Where Were You (When I Needed You)" for Jimmy Briscoe and the Little Beavers. Along with Leon Stuckey he co-wrote "Just How Sweet Is Your Love" for Rhyze, which appears on the Boogie's Gonna Getcha: '80s New York Boogie compilation album. He co-wrote "Be My #2" which appears on the R. Kelly Untitled album. He is also credited with discovering Jimmy Briscoe & The Little Beavers.

== Background ==
Paul Kyser is from New Jersey. He is responsible for singer Retta Young meeting her future husband Al Goodman, who would be notable for his involvement with the groups Moments, and Ray, Goodman & Brown.

== Writing and production ==
Teardrops, Superbs and Devotion

An early production of Paul Kyser's was "Wait For Me" bw "Birdies and Memories" on Gossip TKT-2121 for girl group, The Teardrops, which was released in 1964. Not to be confused with The Teardrops from Cincinnati, Ohio, this Kyser produced group that featured Rhonda Franklin on lead vocals was from New Jersey. Rhonda Franklin would later be part of The Superbs who would record "Love's Unpredictable" in 1968. She didn't sing lead on that song. It was Phillis Harris. "Love's Unpredictable" backed with "Happiest Girl In The World" was released on Catamount 2122 in 1968. Franklin had left the group by the time a promotional picture of Phillis Harris, Harris' sister and another female singer Arnita was produced.

According to the May 8, 1971, issue of Billboard, one of Kyser's and Tom Vetri's recent projects at the time was a production for Colossus Records with the group Devotion. He had recent success with them with his composition, Dawning of Love which charted in the Cash Box Top 60 In R & B Locations chart, peaking at no. 41, and peaking at no. 49 in the Billboard Best Selling Soul Singles chart.

Further activities

His composition, "Body and Soul (That's the Way It's Got to Be)" recorded by Soul Generation got to no. 27 on the R&B chart in 1972.

With Leon Stuckey, he wrote the song "Hypertension". It was a hit in 1975 for the group Calendar, getting on the Billboard Disco Action chart at no. 12 on the week ending July 5, 1975, no. 10 on the Record Mirror UK Disco Chart, and no. 94 on the Cash Box Top 100 R&B chart. It also got into the Billboard Soul chart in 1975.

He wrote and produced the song "Invitation to the World" for Jimmy Briscoe & The Little Beavers which was released in 1977. It was one of two disco singles that Billboard recommended in its October 8 edition that year. It got to no. 91 on the US R&B chart. In 1979, he produced "Into The Milky Way" for the same group. He co-wrote the song with Leon Stuckey.

Manhattans, Commodores, Spinners, Gladys night & the Pips, R. Flack & D. Hathaway, the Jacksons were on Grammy Award for Best R&B Performance by a Duo or Group with Vocals category in 1981. But Kyser's production work on the "Rhyze to the Top" single lost Rhyze a grammy nomination in the Grammy Award for Best R&B Performance by a Duo or Group with Vocals category in 1981.

In 1989, Kyser did well with his production and co-composition of Terry Tate's "Babies Having Babies" which made its debut on debut at no. 80 on the Cash Box Top R&B Singles chart at no. 80, and getting to no. 14 on the twelfth week. It was also a Top Ten, at no. 10 in the Black Singles Billboard chart, spending a total of 18 weeks in the chart.

Kyser and Renee Connel wrote the song "Up Down" which was recorded by New Jersey songstress Parker J. Produced by Game Music, it appeared on her debut album "Lifeline". It entered the Digital Radio Tracker's Global Top 200 Airplay Chart at no. 81.

== Work with Leon Stuckey ==
Leon Stuckey was credited co-composer on many recordings that Kyser wrote and produced. Their co-compositions included, "Oh What A Pity" and "Comin' On Strong". They co wrote "Ain't Nothing New Under The Sun" and "True Love (Is Worth More Than Gold)" for Jimmy Briscoe And The Beavers. Both songs appeared as B sides for singles released on the Wanderick label. They also co-wrote both sides of the Breeze single, "Just In The Nick Of Time" bw "Everybody Loves Music". As a sole composer, Stuckey's work includes "If I Could Have You" bw "Anybody Else But You" for The J.C.B.

The pair's composition, "Hypertension" recorded by Calendar was released on All Platinum 6146 308 in the UK. Making its debut in the Record Mirror UK disco chart on August 9, 1975, "Hypertension" got to no. 10, spending a total of four weeks in the chart. In the US, it made it into the Cash Box R&B chart, peaking at no. 94 on August 30, spending a total of four weeks in the chart. It also made the Billboard Soul chart.

== Labels ==
In the early 1970s he founded the Silver Dollar Records label with Tom Vetri as his vice-president. The first act to have a release on the label was Nu-Sound Express with "Ain't It Good Enough" bw "I've Been Trying". The label would eventually become defunct but came back to life with its reformation in 1980 by Kyser & Vetri, with its new location at 1650 Broadway, New York City 10019.

He set up the New Jersey–based Pi Kappa which released singles from 1973 to 1976 by Jimmy Briscoe and The Little Beavers, Calender, Storm and the Super Disco Band.

He set up the Wanderick label as a subsidiary of TK Records. This was used to release recordings by Jimmy Briscoe And The Beavers. It operated from 1977 until 1978.

== See also ==
- Category:Song recordings produced by Paul Kyser
- Category:Songs written by Paul Kyser
- Grammy Award for Best R&B Performance by a Duo or Group with Vocals
- Delfonics
- The Moments
