= Darrell Banks =

American soul singer (1937–1970)

Background information
- Born: Darrell Eubanks; July 25, 1937; Mansfield, Ohio, U.S.
- Died: February 24, 1970 (aged 32) Detroit, Michigan, U.S.
- Genres: Soul, northern soul
- Occupation: Singer
- Years active: Until 1970
- Labels: Revilot, Stax, Atco, Atlantic

Darrell Banks (born Darrell Eubanks; July 25, 1937 – February 24, 1970) was an American soul singer. He had a hit with 1966's "Open the Door to Your Heart".

== Background ==
Born in Mansfield, Ohio, Banks grew up in Buffalo, New York, and learned to sing in gospel churches before choosing a career in secular music. He signed with Solid Hitbound Productions/Revilot Records, who released his 1966 single "Open the Door to Your Heart" (which, curiously, is legally named "Baby Walk Right In"), written by Donnie Elbert. When the single came out, Banks was credited as the songwriter instead of Elbert, and a protracted legal battle ensued; however, while the courts settled the matter (eventually in Elbert's favor), the tune scaled the US charts, peaking at No. 2 R&B and No. 27 on the Billboard Hot 100.

A second single, "Somebody (Somewhere) Needs You", hit No. 34 R&B and No. 55 pop later that year. Moving to Atco Records, he released the singles "Here Come the Tears" / "I've Got That Feelin" and "Angel Baby (Don't Ever Leave Me)" / "Look into the Eyes of a Fool" in 1967, neither of which charted. Atco also released an album of his which included his Revilot singles. Atco subsidiary Cotillion Records released his last single under the Atlantic Records umbrella, "I Wanna Go Home" / "The Love of My Woman".

From there, Banks signed to Stax Records, who released another album of his in 1969 and two more non-charting singles. They would be Banks's last recordings; in February 1970, Banks was shot and killed by policeman Aaron Bullock in Detroit, Michigan, after Banks intervened in his affair with Banks's girlfriend, Marjorie Bozeman.

In 2014 an online auction of the London Records pressing of "Open the Door to Your Heart" saw bids exceed £10,000. It was believed to be the only copy in circulation, the remainder of the stock having been destroyed when the rival label EMI won the rights to release the single. It eventually sold for in excess of £14,000 (US$23,000). Bank's recording of "Just Because Your Love Is Gone", released as a single on Stax Records in 1969 is also collectable, with Record Collector magazine listing its value at £100 in mint condition, although in 2009 a copy actually sold for twice that amount.

== Discography ==
- Darrell Banks Is Here! (Atco Records, 1967)
- Darrell Is Here to Stay (Stax Records, 1969)
- The Lost Soul (compilation, 1997)
