= Where Were You =

Where Were You may refer to:

- Where Were You?, an album by Joey DeFrancesco, or the title song, 1990

== Songs ==
- "Where Were You (On Our Wedding Day?)", by Lloyd Price from The Exciting Lloyd Price, 1958
- "Where Were You" (song), by Sirusho, 2015
- "Where Were You (When I Needed You)", by Jimmy Briscoe and the Little Beavers, 1973
- "Where Were You (When the World Stopped Turning)", by Alan Jackson, 2001
- "Ships (Where Were You)", by Big Country, 1991
- "Where Were You?", by Black Science Orchestra, 1992
- "Where Were You", by Bonnie Tyler from Bitterblue, 1991
- "Where Were You", by Clay Walker from Hypnotize the Moon, 1995
- "Where Were You", by Jeff Beck from Jeff Beck's Guitar Shop, 1989
- "Where Were You", by the Mend, 2013
- "Where Were You?", by the Mekons, 1978
- "Where Were You?", by Tired Lion from Dumb Days, 2017
