= List of number-one hits of 1975 (Germany) =

This is a list of the German Media Control Top100 Singles Chart number-ones of 1975.

Issue date	Song	Artist
3 January	"Tränen Lügen Nicht"	Michael Holm
10 January	"Tränen Lügen Nicht"	Michael Holm
17 January	"Tränen Lügen Nicht"	Michael Holm
24 January	"You Ain't Seen Nothing Yet"	Bachman-Turner Overdrive
31 January	"Tränen Lügen Nicht"	Michael Holm
7 February	"Griechischer Wein"	Udo Jürgens
14 February	"Griechischer Wein"	Udo Jürgens
21 February	"Griechischer Wein"	Udo Jürgens
28 February	"I Can Help"	Billy Swan
7 March	"Griechischer Wein"	Udo Jürgens
14 March	"Griechischer Wein"	Udo Jürgens
21 March	"Griechischer Wein"	Udo Jürgens
28 March	"Griechischer Wein"	Udo Jürgens
4 April	"Griechischer Wein"	Udo Jürgens
11 April	"Fox on the Run"	Sweet
18 April	"Shame, Shame, Shame"	Shirley & Company
25 April	"Shame, Shame, Shame"	Shirley & Company
2 May	"Shame, Shame, Shame"	Shirley & Company
9 May	"Fox on the Run"	Sweet
16 May	"Fox on the Run"	Sweet
23 May	"Fox on the Run"	Sweet
30 May	"Fox on the Run"	Sweet
6 June	"Fox on the Run"	Sweet
13 June	"Paloma Blanca"	George Baker Selection
20 June	"Paloma Blanca"	George Baker Selection
27 June	"Paloma Blanca"	George Baker Selection
4 July	"Paloma Blanca"	George Baker Selection
11 July	"Paloma Blanca"	George Baker Selection
18 July	"Paloma Blanca"	George Baker Selection
25 July	"Paloma Blanca"	George Baker Selection
1 August	"Paloma Blanca"	George Baker Selection
8 August	"Paloma Blanca"	George Baker Selection
15 August	"Paloma Blanca"	George Baker Selection
22 August	"Paloma Blanca"	George Baker Selection
29 August	"Paloma Blanca"	George Baker Selection
5 September	"Paloma Blanca"	George Baker Selection
12 September	"S.O.S."	ABBA
19 September	"S.O.S."	ABBA
26 September	"S.O.S."	ABBA
3 October	"S.O.S."	ABBA
10 October	"S.O.S."	ABBA
17 October	"S.O.S."	ABBA
24 October	"S.O.S."	ABBA
31 October	"Lady Bump"	Penny McLean
7 November	"Lady Bump"	Penny McLean
14 November	"Lady Bump"	Penny McLean
21 November	"Lady Bump"	Penny McLean
28 November	"Lady Bump"	Penny McLean
5 December	"I'm on Fire"	5000 Volts
12 December	"Lady Bump"	Penny McLean
19 December	"Lady Bump"	Penny McLean
26 December	"Dolannes-Melodie"	Jean-Claude Borelly

== See also ==
- List of number-one hits (Germany)
