= I Write You a Love Song =

Single by Izabella Scorupco

from the album Iza
- A-side: "I Write You a Love Song"
- Released: 1991
- Songwriter: Ole Evenrude

"I Write You a Love Song" was a single released from Izabella Scorupco's 1991/1992 album IZA. The song was written by Ole Evenrude.

With lyrics in Swedish by Mona Gustafsson, as "Jag sjunger för dig", the song was recorded by Leif Bloms, releasing it as a 1991 single. and by Helene & gänget, which the same year was released as a B-side for the single En enkel resa.

The song was also recorded by Charlotte Nilsson in 1999 on her solo album Charlotte, and by Barbados in the year 2000 on the album When the Summer is Gone.

The Leif Bloms version failed to enter Svensktoppen on 4 May 1991.

== Charts ==
Chart (1991–1992)	Peak position
Australia (ARIA)	140
Germany (GfK Entertainment Charts)	93
Sweden (Sverigetopplistan)	10
