= Izabella Scorupco =

Polish-Swedish actress, singer and model (born 1970)

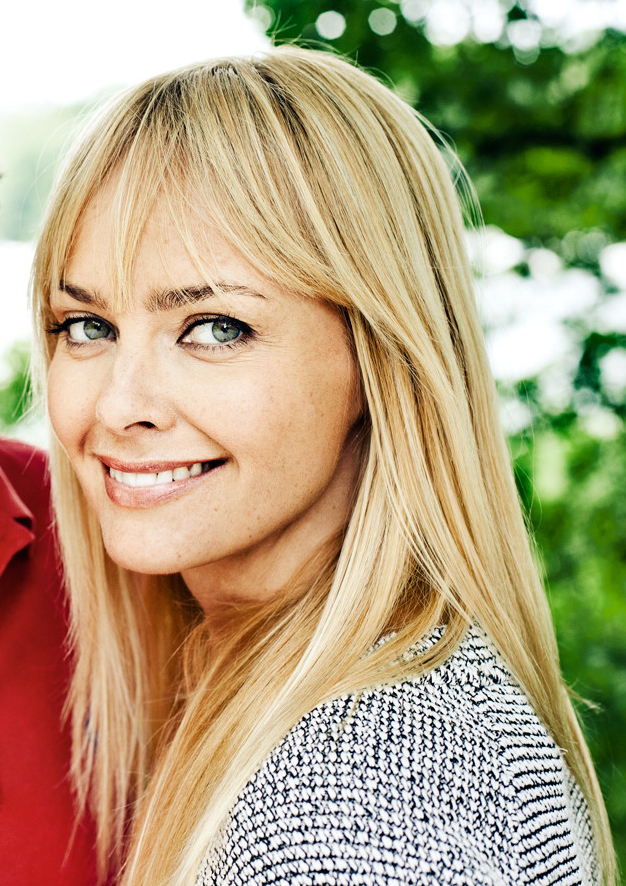
- Scorupco in 2013
- Born: Izabela Dorota Skorupko; 4 June 1970 (age 56); Białystok, Poland
- Citizenship: Poland; Sweden; United States
- Years active: 1988–present
- Agents: Eastern Models: Warsaw; Mikas: Stockholm
- Height: 1.74 m (5 ft 8.5 in)
- Spouses: Mariusz Czerkawski (m. 1996; div. 1998) Jeffrey Raymond (m. 2003; div. 2015) Karl Rosengren (m. 2019)
- Children: 2

Izabella Scorupco (born Izabela Dorota Skorupko; 4 June 1970) is a Polish-Swedish-American actress, singer and model. She is best known for having played a Bond girl, Natalya Simonova, in the 1995 James Bond film GoldenEye. She is also known for her cover of the Shirley & Company song "Shame, Shame, Shame" which was released in 1992 and became a European hit.

== Personal life ==
Scorupco was born to Lech, a musician, and Magdalena Skorupko, a doctor, in Białystok, Poland, in 1970. When she was one year old, her parents separated, and she remained with her mother. In 1978, they moved to Bredäng in Stockholm, Sweden, where Scorupco learned to speak Swedish, English and French.

On 25 December 1996, Scorupco married Polish ice hockey player Mariusz Czerkawski. They had one daughter together. They divorced in 1998.

On 30 January 2003, Scorupco married an American, Jeffrey Raymond; they have a son, Jakob (born 24 July 2003). They divorced in 2015. She now lives in Los Angeles and New York City. Since 2017, Scorupco has been in a relationship with Karl Rosengren. They married on 6 October 2019. In 2014, Scorupco became an American citizen.

== Career ==
In the late 1980s, Scorupco travelled throughout Europe working as a model, and appeared on the cover of Vogue. In 1987, she was discovered by director Staffan Hildebrand and starred in the film Ingen kan älska som vi ("Nobody can love like us"). In the early 1990s, she had a brief but successful career as a pop singer, releasing the album IZA, which was certified gold in Sweden in 1991. Her 1992 cover version of "Shame, Shame, Shame" was a hit in several European countries.

In 2011, Scorupco reprised her singing career, duetting with Swedish musician Peter Jöback in his single Jag Har Dig Nu and featuring in the song's music video. She also starred in Jöback's short extension film La vie, L'amour, La mort. Scorupco went on to host the spring 2012 series of Sweden's Next Top Model but did not continue it for a second series.

Scorupco moved into comedy in July 2013 when she was named to a lead role in a Swedish romantic comedy film, Micke & Veronica, alongside David Hellenius. It premiered on 25 December 2014.

== Filmography ==
Year	Title	Role	Notes
1988	Ingen kan älska som vi	Annelie	
1991	Bert	Zindy Dabrowski	
1991	V som i viking	The Single Mother	TV mini-series
1995	Det var en mörk och stormig natt	Petronella	Short
1995	Petri Tårar	Carla	
1995	GoldenEye	Natalya Simonova	
1999	With Fire and Sword	Helena Kurcewiczówna	
2000	Dykaren	Irena Walde	
2000	Vertical Limit	Monique Aubertine	
2002	Reign of Fire	Alex Jensen	
2004	Exorcist: The Beginning	Sarah Novak	
2005	Alias	Sabina	TV series, Season 4, Episode 15: "Pandora"
2007	Cougar Club	Daniella Stack	
2007	Solstorm	Rebecka Martinsson	
2010	Änglavakt	Cecilia	
2014	Micke & Veronica	Veronica	
2017	Sleepwalker	Dr. Cooper	
2018	Hidden	Eldh	TV series
2018	The Undreaming of Anna Bell Zeigler	Harriet Zeigler	
2023	Barracuda Queens	Margareta Millkvist	TV series

== Discography ==
=== Studio albums ===
Title	Album details	Peak chart position
Title	Album details	SWE
IZA	Released: 1991; Label: Virgin/Warner Music; Formats: CD, digital download	11

=== Singles ===
Title	Year	Peak chart positions								Album
Title	Year	AUS	AUT	BEL (FL)	GER	NL	NOR	SWE	SWI	Album
"Substitute"	1990	—	—	—	—	—	—	3	—	IZA
"I Write You a Love Song"	1991	140	—	—	93	—	—	10	—	IZA
"Brando Moves"	1991	—	—	—	—	—	—	37	—	IZA
"Shame, Shame, Shame"	1992	—	22	4	37	7	2	3	39	IZA
"—" denotes releases that did not chart or were not released in that territory.
