= Hypertension (disambiguation) =

Hypertension may refer to the following:

- Hypertension without a qualifier usually refers to arterial hypertension (high blood pressure of the arteries)
  - Pregnancy-induced hypertension is newly diagnosed arterial hypertension in pregnant women
  - White coat hypertension occurs in a clinical setting but not when measured by the patient at home
  - Renovascular hypertension
  - Hypertensive emergency (malignant hypertension)
- Ocular hypertension is elevated pressure inside the eye (intraocular pressure)
- Pulmonary hypertension, an elevated blood pressure in the pulmonary circulation
- Portal hypertension, an elevated blood pressure in the portal vein or portocaval system
- Intracranial hypertension refers to increased pressure inside the skull
- Hypertension (journal), a journal published by the American Heart Association
- Hypertension (song), a 1975 song by Calendar
