= Shirley Goodman =

American singer (1936–2005)

- Also known as: Shirley Goodman Pixley
- Born: Shirley Mae Goodman; June 19, 1936; New Orleans, Louisiana, US
- Died: July 5, 2005 (aged 69) Los Angeles, California, US
- Genres: Pop, R&B, disco
- Occupation: Singer
- Years active: 1950–1976
- Labels: Aladdin, Warwick, Vibration, All Platinum
- Formerly of: Shirley & Lee, Shirley and Company

Shirley Mae Goodman (June 19, 1936 – July 5, 2005) was an American R&B singer, best known as one half of Shirley & Lee, a 1950s duo. Later in her career, she had a resurgence as part of the group Shirley and Company with the disco hit "Shame, Shame, Shame" in the 1970s.

== Career ==
Goodman was born in New Orleans, Louisiana, United States. After singing in church choirs, she recorded her first demo with a group of friends in 1950. Some months later, her solo voice caught the attention of Aladdin Records owner Eddie Messner, who tracked her down and paired her as a duo with another school friend, Leonard Lee (June 29, 1935 – October 23, 1976).

As Shirley & Lee, they recorded their debut single "I’m Gone", produced by Cosimo Matassa, which reached No. 2 on the Billboard R&B charts in 1952. The record contrasted Goodman's soprano with Leonard's baritone, in a way in which subsequent songwriters have suggested was influential on the development of ska and reggae. Matassa said of Goodman, "When Shirley sang a solo, you had to feel yourself because you thought you were cut and didn't know where the blood was".

In their early songs, they pretended as if they were sweethearts and were dubbed "the Sweethearts of the Blues". However, they changed style in 1956 and recorded "Let the Good Times Roll", which became their biggest hit single reaching No. 1 on the US R&B chart and No. 20 on the Billboard Hot 100 chart. It sold over one million copies, and was awarded a gold disc. As Goodman's obituary in The Independent noted, "It is Shirley Goodman's voice, with its bizarre mixture of flat and sharp notes, that makes the record so distinctive". Although a follow-up single, "I Feel Good" (not to be confused with their 1955 single "Feel So Good"), also made the charts, the duo's later releases were less successful, and the pair moved to the Warwick label in 1959. Goodman and Leonard split up in 1963. Leonard made some subsequent solo records with little success.

In the mid-1960s, Goodman moved to California, where she worked as a session singer on records by Sonny and Cher, Dr. John and others, and also formed a duo for a time with Jessie Hill. She sang backing vocals on The Rolling Stones' album Exile On Main Street, but then briefly retired from the music industry.

On October 15, 1971, Shirley & Lee were reunited for one show only at the Madison Square Garden in New York City. The playbill included musicians of the early rock era, including Chuck Berry, Bo Diddley, and Bobby Rydell.

Later in 1974, as Shirley Goodman Pixley, she was contacted by her friend Sylvia Robinson, previously of the duo Mickey and Sylvia and now co-owner of All Platinum Records, and was persuaded to record the lead vocal on a dance track, "Shame, Shame, Shame". Credited to Shirley & Company, the record became an international pop hit, reaching number 12 on the Billboard Hot 100 chart and presaging the disco boom.

After a few further recordings and tours, Goodman finally retired from the music industry after returning to New Orleans in the late 1970s.

== Post career ==
After having a stroke in 1994, she moved to California, and died on July 5, 2005, in Los Angeles. She was buried in New Orleans.
