= Soul Generation =

American R&B vocal group

- Original members

Background information
- Origin: Jersey City, New Jersey, U.S.
- Genres: R&B, soul
- Years active: 1970-present
- Label: Ebony Sound Records
- Members: Cliff Perkins*; Veda LaRue; Donald Taylor; Krystal Perkins
- Past members: Earl Davenport*; Herman Hammond * Jeffrey Burgess*; Michael Murphy; Ted West; *Original Member

Soul Generation is an American R&B vocal group from Jersey City, New Jersey, which had a number hits in the 1970s, including "Body and Soul (That's the Way It's Got to Be)", "Million Dollars", and "I Wonder What She's Doin'".

== History ==
=== Early days ===
The group was originally known as The Citations, and formed in Jersey City, New Jersey in 1970. Members included group founder Cliff Perkins (lead singer, tenor, choreographer), Earl Davenport (second tenor), Thomas Timmons (bass), and Herman Hammonds (baritone). Timmons left the Citations in 1971 and was replaced by Jeffrey Burgess. The group changed their name to Soul Generation.

=== Career ===
Their first single, "Body and Soul (That's the Way It's Got to Be)" was produced and written by producer, arranger, and promoter Paul Kyser. Soul Generation and Kyser recorded the song at A & R Recording Studios in New York, New York. The single was released on Ebony Sound Records out of Newark, New Jersey, and distributed by Hilary Records Inc. in April 1972. The song spent 11 weeks on the Billboard R&B singles chart, peaking at No. 27 on May 27, 1972. After the release of their debut single, Soul Generation went back to the studio to record an album entitled, Beyond Body and Soul. Soul Generation recorded the album at Record Plant, in New York City, with record producer and arranger Stan Vincent at the helm. The album was released in late 1972, with the single, "Million Dollars", released to radio in February 1973. "Million Dollars", written by Jeffrey Burgess and Stan Vincent, entered the Billboard R&B singles chart on March 10, 1973, where it spent four weeks, peaking at No. 45. The B-side to the single, "Super Fine", was written by, Burgess and Vincent. Their third and final single from the album, "Ray of Hope", was released in April 1973. "Ray of Hope" and the B-side, "Young Bird", was written by Vincent.

In 1974, Bobby Ragona became the group's manager, and Soul Generation released two more singles in the 1970s. "I Wonder What She's Doin'" in 1974, written by Vincent, and "Praying for a Miracle", written by Van McCoy. In 1975, Earl Davenport died and was replaced by Michael Murphy, who stayed with the group until 1977. The group now performed as a trio, with Perkins, Burgess and Hammond until 1982. Soul Generation disbanded in 1983.

=== Later years ===
In 1989, the group reunited with Perkins, Burgess, Hammond, and Ted West performing on the Classic Soul Circuit throughout the country. This unit stayed together until 2004. New members, Veda LaRue-Perkins and Donald Taylor replaced Hammond and Burgess. Krystal Perkins, who is Cliff Perkin's daughter performs with the group as well.

In 2004, with Perkins the only original member left in the group, the name was changed to Soul Generations featuring Cliff Perkins. As of 2020, Soul Generation featuring Cliff Perkins is still performing and celebrating 50 years in the music industry.

== Discography ==
=== Studio albums ===
- 1972: Beyond Body and Soul
- 2013: Oooh! Baby

=== Singles ===
Year	Title	Peak chart positions
Year	Title	US R&B
1972	Body and Soul	27
1973	Million Dollars	45
1973	Ray of Hope	—
1973	I Wonder What She's Doin'	—
1974	Baby "Praying For A Miracle	—
2013	Oooh! Baby	—
2013	Your Way	—
2013	Heaven Only Knows	—
2013	Yesterday's Memories	—
"—" denotes a recording that did not chart.
