= Dawning of Love =

Song by Devotion
- A-side: "Dawning of Love"
- B-side: "So Glad You're Home"
- Label: Colossus 126
- Composer: Paul L. Kyser
- Producers: Kyser & Vetri

"Dawning of Love" was a single for the female vocal group Devotion in 1970. It became a hit for them and charted in both the Billboard and Cash Box charts.

== Background ==
=== Paul Kyser's changing the group line up and release ===
Paul Kyser had the record released twice. The first time was with The Superbs (on Symbol SYMBOL 8).

The group's earlier line up included former lead singer of The Teardrops, Rhonda Franklin who joined the group. With Paul Kyser in his first time as a horns and strings arranger, the group recorded "Love's Unpredictable" with Phillis Harris on lead. Kyser co-produced it with Stan R. Krause. The song, backed with "Happiest Girl In The World" was released on Catamount 2122 in 1968.

The group was photographed for a promotional picture. By the time they were photographed Rhonda Franklin had left the group. Pictured were Phillis Harris, Arnita (surname unknown) and Harris' sister.

The second time Kyser released the single (Colossus C 126), he changed the name of the group to Devotion. At some stage Kyser replaced the original line up with the new one of, Retta Young, Bertha and Madge Quince. This line-up recorded their first release, "The Saga of Willie Jones".

=== Trade reports ===
First release Superbs - Symbol, SYMBOL 8

Record World reported in the October 11, 1969 issue that the Symbol label, a subsidiary of Sue Records announced that week a release by The Superbs, "The Dawning of Love". Written by Paul L. Kyser, the A side was backed with "So Glad You're Home", and released on Symbol SYMBOL 8.

Second release Devotion - Colossus 126

Given a four star rating by Record World in the August 22 issue, the reviewer remarked that the lead singer sounded like a cross between Freda Payne and Diana Ross. The reviewer also said that this was a dynamic new group with a female lead singer, and the song had a tremendous contemporary lyric. On the week of September 25, it was listed as a Top Regional Prospect in Bill Gavin's Record Report #815 Weekly Summary.

As of the time info collected for the December 26 issue of Billboard, the three-piece group had appeared at the Lafayette Playhouse in Paterson, N.J., the US Navy Base in Brooklyn, and had done campus dates and fairs. They had also made TV appearances on Scene '70 and Upbeat. The contact was Paul Kyser.

== Airplay ==
It was reported in the October 3 issue of Record World that the Devotions were getting air play at WVON in Chicago. In the October 10 issue of Record World, the Where It's At R&B Beat prediction said, "Devotions is shaping up and should do well". In issue October 17, Where It's At R&B Beat reported that they were continuing to gain. They were also getting play at WJMO in Cleveland. By the 24th, Where It's At R&B Beat reported that they were on the WJON, Chicago chart. The week of November 7, they were getting play at WDIA, Memphis.

== Charts ==
On the week ending October 3, 1970, "Dawning of Love" entered the Cash Box Top 60 In R & B Locations chart at no. 60. It peaked at no. 41 on the week of October 24.

On the week ending October 17, 1970, "Dawning of Love" had entered the Billboard Best Selling Soul Singles chart at no. 50. It peaked at no. 49 having spent three weeks in the chart.

=== Chart summary ===
Chart (1970)	Peak position
Top 60 In R & B Locations (Cash Box)	41
Best Selling Soul Singles (Billboard)	49
