= Babies Having Babies =

Single by Terry Tate
- A-side: "Babies Having Babies"
- B-side: "Babies Having Babies (Instrumental)"
- Released: 1989
- Length: 6:01 (Extended Club / Radio Version); 3:42
- Label: Trumpet Records TR-166; Atlantic 7-88814
- Composers: T. Tate, P. Kyser, R. Youngblood

Terry Tate singles chronology
"Babies Having Babies" (1989)	"My Eyes Cry" (1990)

"Babies Having Babies" is a 1989 single by Terry Tate. A top-ten hit on the Billboard R&B singles chart, it also reached the Cash Box R&B singles chart.

== Background ==
The song is about teenage pregnancy.

The song was written by Terry Tate, Paul Kyser and R. Youngblood. It was produced by Kyser. It was released in 12"-format on Trumpet Records TR-66.

Tate, a former New Jersey high school teacher, used what he had learnt about his 14 and 15-year-old students being parents to write the song. In a 2015 article in the Dallas Morning News about the trend of underage pregnancy in Dallas, the song is mentioned. The words in the song include, "Babies are having babies / Yes, they are. / We must be crazy / To let our babies have babies". It was later released on Atlantic 7-88814 in a 7" format.

It was noted by Billboard in the August 26 issue that it was making an impression in many markets that it was picked up for major release. It was now on 7" on Atlantic 7–88814. Atlantic ran an ad in the August 25 issue of Radio & Records picturing Tate with the caption "If you really care about your audience, Please play..."Babies Having Babies". The magazine also listed it as a breaker with 63% of their reporting stations on it.

== Reviews ==
John O'Day of WMML in Mobile, Alabama said that Tate had come up with a timely message and the radio audience would be cheated if it wasn't heard.

It was reviewed in the June 10 issue of Billboard. Referring to the record as having a timely topic, the reviewer noted that it was slowly getting recognition on radio and that it could be a sleeper hit.

In the New Releases section of the June 30 issue of The Gavin Report by Betty Hollers and Brian Samson, Tate's smooth vocals and song invoking intense emotions were noted. It was regarded as perfect summertime addition with crossover eppeal. The previous week, Dennis Scott of KDKO had called in his report and remarked that the song was blowing people away.

== Airplay ==
On the week of May 18, Black Radio Exclusive reported that the song was an add on at WILA and WVST. On the week of August 25, Radio & Records showed the track as receiving a good amount of airplay with most of the action being in the Midwest and South.

== Charts ==
For the week of July 22, 1989, "Babies Having Babies" made its debut at no. 80 in the Cash Box Top R&B Singles chart. On October 7 at week twelve, the record reached its peak position at no. 14.

The song also made it to no. 10 on the Billboard R&B chart, spending a total of 18 weeks on the chart.

It also registered in the R&B Report R&B chart, The R&B Report Quiet Storm chart, Hitmakers Urban Top 40 chart, Black Radio Exclusive Singles chart and Radio & Record Urban Contemporary chart.

1989Chart summary
Chart	Peak	Period	Wks	Notes #
Cash Box Top R&B Singles	14		19	
Billboard Hot Black Singles	10		18	
The R&B Report The R&B Chart	15		5	
Jet Jet's Top 20 Singles	7	Sept 11 - Oct 16		First charting period * Name misspelt as Teddy Tate
Jet Jet's Top 20 Singles	9	Oct. 30 - Nov. 27		Second charting period
Radio & Records Urban Contemporary	17	Aug. 18 - Sept 29.		

Year end charts
Chart	Number	Year	Notes #
R&B Report Quiet Storm Top 50 1989	8	1989	

== Other info ==
- Publisher - Micro-Mini / Chatterback, BMI

== Later years ==
The song appears on the CD album, Babies Having Babies released on Collectables COL-5704 in 1996.
