= Jimmy Briscoe & the Little Beavers =

Jimmy Briscoe & The Little Beavers, later known as Jimmy Briscoe & the Beavers, was a 1970s singing group.

== Background ==
In the 1970s, when The Jackson 5's popularity gave rise to many other teenage groups, five young men from Baltimore, Maryland were discovered at a talent show in Baltimore by music promoter Paul Kyser. They recorded a number of singles, starting with Frankie Lymon & the Teenagers' "Why Do Fools Fall in Love", backed with "Sugar Brown", in 1971 on Atlantic Records and then for the Pi Kappa label distributed by Buddah Records as one of its subsidiary/affiliated labels. Their album My Ebony Princess, released by Pi Kappa in 1974, was reviewed as a "top album pick" by Billboard magazine; the title cut gave them their greatest success. The group's vocal harmony set them apart from the other groups, though lack of distribution left them relatively unknown to the public. Other releases included "Where Were You (When I Needed You)", "I Only Feel This Way When I'm With You", "I'll Care For You", and "So Sweet The Love".

The group's original lineup was Milton W Faulkner jr., Jimmy Briscoe, Stanford Stansbury, Kevin Barnes, Maurice Pulley, and Robert Makins. Faulkner remained with them only a short time and Bobby Finch replaced Makins in 1977, during which time the group dropped the "Little" from its name. After attempting to change their style with several disco-oriented releases on a number of other labels and finding only minor success, the group disbanded after briefly recording under the name Breeze, though they unite to do oldies shows.

== Career ==
In 1973, their Paul Kyser song, "Where Were You (When I Needed You)" was released as the A side on the single, cat no. Pi Kappa 400. It got to both no. 55 in the Record World R&B Singles chart and Cash Box Top 70 R&B Chart. It also got to no. 68 on the Billboard soul chart that year. They had another hit the following year with "My Ebony Princess" which was written by Lana Rush & Paul Kyser. It got to no. 86 on the Soul chart.

They had four more Billboard hits, all Kyser Compositions (Two with Leon Stuckey) with the final being "Invitation to the World" which was released on Wanderick 70001 in 1977. It made it to no. 91 on the R&B chart.
