= Body and Soul (That's the Way It's Got to Be) =

1972 song by Soul Generation

Single by Soul Generation

from the album Beyond Body and Soul
- B-side: "Mandingo Woman"
- Released: April 1972
- Studio: A & R Recording Studios
- Genre: R&B, Soul
- Length: 2:58
- Label: Ebony Sounds Records
- Songwriter(s): Paul Kyser
- Producer(s): Paul Kyser, Harvey Posner

Soul Generation singles chronology
"Body and Soul (That's the Way It's Got to Be)" (1972)	"Million Dollars" (1973)

"Body and Soul (That's the Way It's Got to Be)" is the debut single by the American Soul/R&B vocal group, Soul Generation. The song was written by producer Paul Kyser and released in April 1972.

== Background ==
Soul Generation recorded the single at A & R Recording Studios in New York, and it was produced by Paul Kyser and Harvey Posner arranged by producer, Stan Vincent. The single became a Top 40 hit spending 11 weeks on Billboards R&B/Soul Chart and peaking at #27 in May 1972. The single was released on Ebony Sound Records and distributed by Hilary Records, Inc. The B-side, "Mandingo Woman" was written by, Irwin Levine, L. Russell Brown.

== Personnel ==
Cliff Perkins, Earl Davenport, Jeffrey Burgess, and Herman Hammonds.
