= Open the Door to Your Heart =

Single by Darrell Banks

from the album Darrell Banks Is Here!
- B-side: "Our Love (Is in the Pocket)"
- Released: 1966
- Recorded: 1966
- Genre: Soul
- Length: 2:37
- Label: Revilot
- Songwriters: Donnie Elbert, Darrell Banks
- Producer: Solid Hitbound Productions

Darrell Banks singles chronology
"Open the Door to Your Heart" (1966)	"Somebody (Somewhere) Needs You" (1966)

"Open the Door to Your Heart" is a song by American soul singer Darrell Banks. Written by Banks and Donnie Elbert, it was first released as a single in 1966. It has been described as "one of the finest non-Motown releases to emerge from Detroit".

== Background ==
Although written by Banks' friend, Donnie Elbert, and called "Baby, Walk Right In" as a working title, Banks completed the recording and changed its name, while Elbert was on tour. When released, writing credits were given to Banks on the record label. Having checking with Broadcast Music, Inc., a performing rights organization, Elbert discovered that a song clearance form submitted by Banks had him listed as the sole writer which would entitle him to 100% of performance income. Elbert sought legal action and although initial releases of the vinyl 45rpm single list only Banks' name as songwriter, later released CDs credit both Banks and Elbert. Never content with the ruling, Elbert claimed that for a 50% share of writing credits Banks' contribution was to slightly speed up the tempo. Not considered to be a songwriter, "Open the Door to Your Heart" is the only song which Banks wrote but as Elbert claimed, he played no part in the writing. Motown's Mike Terry played the baritone saxophone on both songs. The B side was "Our Love (Is in the Pocket)" written by George Clinton, Joanne Jackson and Rose Marie McCoy. This was another favourite of the Northern soul scene when covered by J. J. Barnes.

== Chart success ==
Released in the US in 1966 on the Revilot label, it was Banks' biggest hit. "Open the Door to Your Heart" peaked at number two on the R&B charts and number 27 on the Hot 100, Billboard charts. Based on chart positions throughout the year, it ranked 14th in a list of top R&B singles for 1966. In 1966 the record was released in the UK on the London label only for the release to be pulled as it was discovered that the label did not own the rights to the song. Consequently, it was released in the UK on the Stateside label and became very popular on the Northern soul music scene. In December 2014, collectors were bidding in excess of £11,000 for a copy of the London Records single, thought to be the only copy still in existence. It had previously been thought that all the original versions had been destroyed when rival label EMI won the rights to release the single in the UK. The copy eventually sold for £14,543.
