= The Teardrops (girl group) =

American musical group

- Origin: Cincinnati, Ohio, United States
- Genre: Pop
- Years active: 1961–1969
- Labels: Saxony Records; Musicor Records
- Past members: Dorothy Sunni Dyer; Linda Lin Schroeder; Pat (Punkin)Strunk; Wanda Wendy Sheriff; Tinker Smiddy; Bobbie Frost; Susie Leight

The Teardrops were an American girl group popular during the 1960s.

== Background ==
The Teardrops were formed in Cincinnati, Ohio around 1963 by two friends, Dorothy Dyer and Linda Schroeder, both age 15. They later recruited Hughes High School student and school friend Pat Strunk as the third voice. The early line up consisted of Linda Schroeder, Pat Strunk, Dorothy Dyer, and Wanda Sheriff.

This group has no relation to The New Jersey group The Teardrops who had Rhonda Franklin as their lead singer.

== Career ==
In the winter of 1963 Linda and Dorothy were with a group of teenage friends at the Tulu Club in Cincinnati. A male singing group called the Squires had been performing at the Tulu Club for several weeks, but failed to show up on the night the group of friends were at the club. Several of the members of the crowd of friends would sing Doo Wop songs (before it was called Doo-Wop) in the neighborhood Inwood Park. When the Squires failed to show, Linda and Dorothy were convinced to sing a cappella to the songs. They were spotted by musician/arranger George Bud Reneau, who then introduced them to his partner, songwriter Paul Trefzger. The trio signed with Bud and Paul's Saxony Records in 1964; along with the deal came fourth member, Wanda Sheriff. The now-quartet recorded "Tonight I'm Gonna Fall In Love" / "That's Why I'll Get By" in the fall of 1964. It received local airplay in Cincinnati, and in other cities across the US. The Teardrops' local success had them opening for The Beach Boys and Sonny and Cher.

In early 1965, they followed up with "Call Me and I'll Be Happy", which featured Schroeder on lead. After the single's release, founding member Dyer decide to leave the group, and was replaced by Tinker Smiddy. Their third single "Tears Come Tumbling" was granted national distribution by Musicor Records, who also issued their final single, "I Will Love You Dear Forever", in 1966.

By late 1966, other founding members, Sheriff and Strunk both left with Smiddy departing the group the following year. Dyer later returned to the group, rejoining Schroder along with two new members, Bobbie Frost and Susie Leight, for the final incarnation, until marriage and career changes caused the group to break up in 1969.

By the 1980s, all of the Teardrops recordings resurfaced on vinyl in the United Kingdom, including the unreleased track "Here Comes Loneliness" which went on to become a Northern soul favorite along with the B-sides, "Bubblegummer", "You Won't Be There", and "I'm Gonna Steal Your Boyfriend". In 2001, Saxony Records released a compact disc of all the Teardrops material.

Linda Schroeder-Milazzo died in 2003. Dorothy Dyer-Wethington and her husband still live in Cincinnati. Pat (Punkin) Strunk-Howard lives near lake Cumberland with her husband. Wanda (Wendy) Sheriff-Engelhardt lives part-time in Cincinnati and part-time at her retirement cabin in Daniel Boone National Forest. They reunited around 1989 for a reunion ball at the Clarion in Cincinnati, and performed various places for a few months. Author John Clemente included The Teardrops in his book Girl Groups... Fabulous Females Who Rocked the World, and The Teardrops performed at Yesteryears Club for the premier book signing at the release of his book. Dorothy remained in doo-wop music the longest, still singing with groups in the Cincinnati Area.

== Members ==
- Dorothy Dyer (1961–1965, 1967–1969)
- Linda Schroeder (1961–1969)
- Pat (Punkin) Strunk (1961–1966)
- Wanda Wendy Sheriff (1964–1966)
- Hazel "Tinker" Smiddy (1965–1967)
- Bobbie Frost (1967–1969)
- Susie Leight (1967–1969)

== Discography ==
=== Singles ===
- "Tonight I'm Gonna Fall In Love Again" / "That's Why I'll Get By" - Saxony 1007 (1964)
- "I'm Gonna Steal Your Boyfriend" / "Call Me And I'll Be Happy" - Saxony 1008 (1965)
- "Tears Come Tumbling" / "You Won't Be There" - Saxony 1009
- "Tears Come Tumbling" / "You Won't Be There" - Musicor 1139
- "I Will Love You Dear Forever" / "Bubblegummer" - Musicor 1218 (1966)
- "Here Comes Loneliness" (UK only) (1985)
- "I Will Love You Dear Forever" / "Bubblegummer" - Saxony 2002 (1993)
- "Here Comes Loneliness" / "Walking Down Main Street" - Saxony 3003 (2001)

=== Albums ===
- Girls About Town (You Won't Be There) (UK) - Impact 006 (1985)
- The Best of The Teardrops - Saxony 101 (2001)

== Notes ==
- ^ Clemente, John (2000). Girl Groups—Fabulous Females That Rocked The World. Iola, Wisc. Krause Publications. pp. 276. ISBN 0-87341-816-6. ^ Clemente, John (2013). Girl Groups—Fabulous Females Who Rocked The World. Bloomington, IN Authorhouse Publications. pp. 623. ISBN 978-1-4772-7633-4 (sc); ISBN 978-1-4772-8128-4 (e).
