= The Whatnauts =

American soul group

- Origin: Baltimore, Maryland, U.S.
- Genres: R&B, soul
- Years active: 1969–1983
- Labels: A&I Records, Stang, GSF, Harlem International
- Members: Billy Herndon; Garnett Jones; Gerard 'Chunky' Pinkney

The Whatnauts were an American soul group from Baltimore, Maryland, founded in 1969. George Kerr produced them. The group had several hit singles in the early 1970s, including the socially conscious single "Message from a Black Man" in 1970 on A&I International, "Please Make the Love Go Away" also in 1970 on Stang, and their biggest success "I'll Erase Away Your Pain" in 1971. They performed with fellow Stang artists the Moments for the hit single "Girls" in 1974.

== Members ==
- Billy Herndon
- Garnett Jones
- Gerard "Chunky" Pinkney

== Discography ==
=== Albums ===
Year	Album	Chart positions
Year	Album	US R&B
1970	Introducing the Whatnauts	29
1971	Reaching for the Stars	—
1972	Whatnauts on the Rocks	—
"—" denotes releases that did not chart.

=== Singles ===
List of singles, with selected chart positions
Title	Year	Peak chart positions					Certifications	Album
Title	Year	US Pop	US R&B	US Disco/ Dance	AUS	UK	Certifications	Album
"Message from a Black Man"	1970	99	19	—	—	—		Introducing the Whatnauts
"Please Make the Love Go Away"	1970	—	47	—	—	—		Introducing the Whatnauts
"What's Left to Give (After Giving It All)"	1970	—	—	—	—	—		Introducing the Whatnauts
"I'll Erase Away Your Pain"	1971	71	14	—	—	—		Introducing the Whatnauts
"We're Friends by Day (And Lovers by Night)"	1971	100	37	—	—	—		Reaching for the Stars
"Try Me"	1972	—	—	—	—	—		Reaching for the Stars
"You Forget Too Easy"	1972	—	—	—	—	—		Whatnauts on the Rocks
"I Wasn't There"	1973	—	—	—	—	—		Non-album singles
"Instigating (Trouble Making Fool)"	1973	—	23	—	—	—		Non-album singles
"Let Me Be That Special One"	1974	—	—	—	—	—		Non-album singles
"Girls" (with The Moments)	1974	—	25	10	100	3	BPI: Silver	Non-album singles
"Help Is on the Way"	1981	—	46	20	—	—		Non-album singles
"Still I'll Rise"	1983	—	—	—	—	—		Non-album singles
"—" denotes a recording that did not chart or was not released in that territory.
