= Donnie Elbert =

American singer and songwriter (1936–1989)

Background information
- Born: Donnie Elbert; May 25, 1936; New Orleans, Louisiana, U.S.
- Died: January 26, 1989 (aged 52) Philadelphia, Pennsylvania, U.S.
- Genres: Soul, R&B, disco
- Occupations: Singer, songwriter
- Instruments: Vocals, multi-instrumentalist
- Years active: 1955–late 1970s
- Label: Numerous

Donnie Elbert (May 25, 1936 – January 26, 1989) was an American soul singer and songwriter, who had a prolific career from the mid-1950s to the late 1970s. His U.S. hits included "Where Did Our Love Go?" (1971), and his reputation as a Northern soul artist in the UK was secured by "A Little Piece of Leather", a performance highlighting his powerful falsetto voice.

== Career ==
Elbert was born in New Orleans, Louisiana, but when aged three his family relocated to Buffalo, New York. He learned to play guitar and piano as a child, and in 1955 formed a doo-wop group, the Vibraharps, with friend Danny Cannon. Elbert acted as the group's guitarist, songwriter, arranger, and background vocalist, making his recording debut on their single "Walk Beside Me". He left the group in 1957 for a solo career, and recorded a demonstration record that earned him a recording contract with the King label's DeLuxe subsidiary. His solo debut "What Can I Do?" reached No. 12 in the U.S. R&B chart, and he followed it up with the less successful "Believe It or Not" and "Have I Sinned?", which became a regional hit in Pittsburgh.

He continued to release singles on DeLuxe, but with little commercial success, and also played New York's Apollo Theater and toured the Chitlin' Circuit of African-American owned nightclubs. After completing an album, The Sensational Donnie Elbert Sings, he left DeLuxe in 1959, joining first Red Top Records, where in 1960 he recorded "Someday (You'll Want Me to Want You)", and then Vee-Jay Records, where he had another regional hit with "Will You Ever Be Mine?", which reportedly sold 250,000 copies in the Philadelphia area but failed to take off nationwide. His career was also interrupted by a spell in the US Army, from which he was discharged in 1961. He then recorded singles for several labels, including Parkway, Cub and Checker, but with little success. However, although the 1965 Gateway label release of "A Little Piece of Leather" failed to chart in the US, the record became a No. 27 hit when released on the London label in the UK in 1972, and remains a Northern soul favorite.

Elbert relocated to the UK in 1966, where he married. There, he recorded "In Between The Heartaches" for the Polydor label in 1968 and an album of Otis Redding cover versions, Tribute To A King. His 1969 Deram release "Without You" had a rocksteady rhythm, and went to the top of the Jamaican charts.

He returned to the US the same year and had his first US chart hit in over a decade with the Rare Bullet release, "Can't Get Over Losing You", which reached No. 26 on the Billboard R&B chart. The track and its b-side, "Got To Get Myself Together", both written by Elbert, were released several times on different labels in subsequent years. After the success of that record, Elbert moved labels for a re-make of the Supremes' 1964 hit, "Where Did Our Love Go?" on All Platinum. It became his biggest hit, reaching No. 15 on the Billboard pop chart, No. 6 on the R&B chart, and (in 1972) No. 8 in the UK. Its follow-up, "Sweet Baby" reached No. 30 on the US R&B chart in early 1972.

Elbert then signed with Avco-Embassy, where he entered the recording studio with the successful production team of Hugo & Luigi. His cover of the Four Tops' "I Can't Help Myself" reached No. 14 on the Billboard R&B chart, but climbed to No. 2 on the alternative Cashbox R&B chart. Elbert baulked at the label's insistence that he record material associated with Motown and departed with only a few tracks left to record for an album. Even so, the album was released after Avco sold it on to a budget label, Trip.

He returned to All Platinum and had a run of minor R&B hits, but left after a disagreement over the claimed authorship of Shirley & Company's R&B chart-topper "Shame Shame Shame", which was credited to label owner Sylvia Robinson. Elbert was also involved in a copyright wrangle over Darrell Banks' major R&B and pop hit in 1966, "Open the Door to Your Heart". He had originally written the song as "Baby Walk Right In" (still its alternative legal title) and given it to Banks, but received no writing credit on the original record. Eventually, the matter was resolved by BMI with a disgruntled Elbert awarded joint authorship with Banks. "Open The Door" has since been given award-winning status by BMI and is one of over 100 songs written or co-written by Elbert.

For 1975's "You Keep Me Crying (With Your Lying)", Elbert formed his own label and "I Got to Get Myself Together", appeared on an imprint bearing his surname, but it was among his final recordings.

By the mid-1980s, Elbert had retired from performing and became director of A&R for Polygram's Canadian division. He suffered a massive stroke and died in 1989, at the age of 52.

== Discography ==
=== Chart singles ===
Year	Single	Chart Positions				
Year	Single	US Pop	US R&B	AUS	CAN	UK
1957	"What Can I Do"	61	12	-	-	-
1970	"Can't Get Over Losing You"	98	26	-	-	-
1971	"Where Did Our Love Go"	15	6	92	55	8
1972	"Sweet Baby"	92	30	-	-	-
1972	"I Can't Help Myself (Sugar Pie Honey Bunch)"	22	14	75	37	11
1972	"If I Can't Have You"	-	30	-	-	-
1972	"Little Piece of Leather" (reissue)	-	-	-	-	27
1973	"This Feeling of Losing You"	-	77	-	-	-
1974	"Love Is Strange"	-	70	-	-	-
1977	"What Do You Do"	-	94	-	-	-

=== Albums ===
- The Sensational Donnie Elbert Sings (King, 1959)
- Tribute to a King (1968)
- Where Did Our Love Go? (All Platinum, 1971) U.S. No. 153, R&B No. 45
- Have I Sinned? (Deluxe, 1971)
- Stop in the Name of Love (Trip, 1972)
- A Little Bit of Leather (1972)
- Roots of Donnie Elbert (Ember, 1973)
- Dancin' the Night Away (All Platinum, 1977)

== See also ==
- List of disco artists (A-E)
