= Where Were You (When I Needed You) =

Song by Jimmy Briscoe and the Little Beavers
- A-side: "My Fallin Angel (You Turned Out To Be A Devil)"
- B-side: "Where Were You (When I Needed You)"
- Written: Paul L. Kyser
- Label: Pi Kappa Records PK-400
- Producer(s): A Kyser-Vetri Production

"Where Were You (When I Needed You)" is a single by Jimmy Briscoe and the Little Beavers, released in 1973. It was a hit for them that year, registering in the Cash Box, Record World and Billboard charts.

== Airplay ==
For the week of September 8, 1973, it was added to the playlist of WOOK in Washington.

== Background ==
"Where Were You" was released on Pi Kappa Records PK-400 in 1973. It was actually the B side of the single. The A side was "My Fallin Angel (You Turned Out To Be A Devil)". It was reviewed by Record World in the Single Picks section. With a positive note the reviewer also mentioned the Jacksons' and Silver's listener potential. It was also breaking in Baltimore.

It was reported by Cash Box's R&B News Report on August 25 that the single was showing strong sales in Washington, Baltimore and Richmond. "My Fallin' Angel" was listed in the Record World Spins & Sales section on the week of August 25.

== Chart performance ==
For the week of August 25, 1973, "Where Were You" debuted on the Record World R&B Singles chart at no. 73. It peaked at no. 55 on the week of September 22 and held that position for another week, spending seven weeks in the chart.

It entered the Cash Box R&B Top 70 chart at no. 65 on the week of September 1, 1973. It peaked at no. 55 for the week of October 6. It also peaked at no. 68 on the Billboard chart.

=== Charts ===
Chart (1973)	Peak position
US Best Selling Soul Singles (Billboard)	68
US Best Selling Soul Singles (Record World)	55
US Top 60 in R&B Locations (Cash Box)	55
