= The Rimshots =

American funk and disco band

- Origin: United States
- Genres: Funk, disco
- Labels: All Platinum, Stang
- Past members: Bernadette Randle; Clarence Oliver; Jonathan Williams; Mozart Pierre-Louis; Tommy Keith; Walter Morris

The Rimshots were an American funk and disco band, popular in the late 1970s

== Background ==
The group started out as the house band for the record labels All Platinum Records and in particular, Stang Records in the early 1970s. The then nameless rhythm section recorded for the artists signed to the company (including Hank Ballard, Donnie Elbert, Shirley & Company, Chuck Jackson, Brook Benton, Solomon Burke, Brother to Brother, Eleanor Mills, The Moments, and Etta James). Along with King Curtis, they recorded the original theme song for the 1971 hit television show, Soul Train.

From 1972 to 1976, this studio band recorded over fifty projects for Platinum-Chess Records. The group also had the ability to accurately replicate rhythm tracks previously recorded by other artists. Joe Robinson, the company's president, had the group reproduce an American hit "7-6-5-4-3-2-1 (Blow Your Whistle)", and released the single in Europe under the artist name 'The Rimshots'; and that is when the rhythm section's new identity was launched. The group became a reluctant new artist and began touring internationally as The Rimshots, appearing twice on the BBC's Top of the Pops, and other international venues. Despite their unwitting success as a disco group, their studio discography is unparalleled by their limited recordings under this name.

Their original music tended toward a hard funk sound, mainly influenced by three musicians who formed the core of the group. Guitarist Walter Morris, bassist Jonathan Williams, and drummer Clarence Oliver (all from the Richmond, Virginia area) were the original stage band for The Moments. Keyboardist, Bernadette Randle (St. Louis, Missouri), was brought to the studio by owner, Sylvia Robinson and the record producer, Michael Burton (collaborators on Robinson's 1973 single "Pillow Talk"). Rhythm guitarist, Tommy Keith (Philadelphia, Pennsylvania) was under contract to the recording company as a writer and producer. Organist, Mozart Pierre Louis (Haiti) performed with the group on stage, but did not record with them in the studio. In this six-man configuration, they toured as The Moments' band throughout the 1970s.

By the mid-1970s, however, the group became recognized as a disco band, due in large part to the European success of their cover of the song "Blow Your Whistle". They also scored a few modest chart hits with their original tunes. "Do What You Feel (Part 1)" (written by Walter Morris) reached #93 on the US Billboard charts, and "Super Disco" (written by Tommy Keith) reached #49 R&B, and #7 on the Disco Singles chart. When Randle left the company, she was replaced by Sammy Lowe Jr. for the final year or so that the group remained intact. Lowe's father, Sammy Lowe Sr., was the orchestrator for the Platinum-Chess label for over ten years.

The group was eventually sampled extensively by hip-hop artists.

== Career ==
The group's single "7-6-5-4-3-2-1 (Blow Your Whistle)" was mentioned in the 5 July 1975 issue of Sounds. Robin Katz referred to it as "the most controversial record around. It was also recorded by Gary Toms Empire for the Epic label. Katz wrote that CBS thought they had the superior version and mail both versions to the DJs.

The group recorded their album '"Down to Earth which was released on Stang ST-1028. It had a short review in Fringe Albums section of the 26 May 1976 issue of '"Walrus Stats. The reviewer said that title song wasn't bad and that they mostly lived up to their rhythmic implicated name and the disco was solid. However, the reviewer did say that there were a few anemic exceptions.

The rhythm section of the band backed Brook Benton on his Mr. Bartender album which was released on All Platinum 9109303 in 1976. It was given a mediocre review by Jane Iles in the 29 May issue of Record Mirror.

The Rimshots appeared with The Moments at the Imus club in New York. Robert Foro, Jr. reviewed the performance in the 30 July 1977 issue of Billboard. He referred to the Rimshots as one of the better soul instrumental combos that were working at the time. The issue was that the club only had a seating capacity of 110 and the Rimshots took all of the stage space which left the Moments having to compete for space with the patrons and waiters. In spite of that the review was positive and he mentioned the Moments were able to perform most of their hits during the fifty minutes they had. The only disappointment mentioned was that the Rimshots had their own hit "Super Disco" and with their "considerable talents" didn't have time to display them.

== Members ==
- Walter Morris – lead guitar
- Tommy Keith – rhythm guitar
- Clarence Oliver – drums
- Jonathan Williams – bass
- Bernadette Randle – keyboards
- Mozart Pierre Louis – organ

== Discography ==
=== Albums ===
- Soul Train (A-I Records, 1972)
- Down to Earth (Stang Records, 1976) U.S. R&B #41

=== Singles ===
- " " Save that Thing" (A-I, 1972)
- " "7-6-5-4-3-2-1 (Blow Your Whistle)" (Stang, 1975) - UK #26
