= Shame, Shame, Shame (Shirley & Company song) =

1974 single by Shirley & Company

Single by Shirley & Company

from the album Shame, Shame, Shame
- B-side: "More Shame" (U.K., Europe); "Shame, Shame, Shame" (Instrumental) (U.S.)
- Released: December 1974
- Recorded: 1974
- Studio: Soul Sound Studios, Englewood, New Jersey
- Genre: Disco; soul
- Length: 3:47
- Label: Vibration
- Songwriter: Sylvia Robinson

Shirley & Company singles chronology
"Shame, Shame, Shame" (1974)	"Cry, Cry, Cry" (1975)

Music video
- Shirley & Company – Shame, Shame, Shame • TopPop on YouTube

"Shame, Shame, Shame" is a 1974 hit song written and produced by Sylvia Robinson, performed by American disco band Shirley & Company and released on the Vibration label. The female vocalist is Shirley Goodman, who was one half of Shirley & Lee, who had enjoyed a major hit 18 years earlier, in 1956, with the song "Let The Good Times Roll" for Aladdin Records. The male vocalist is Jesus Alvarez. The saxophone solo is by Seldon Powell, whose instrumental version, "More Shame", is the B-side.

The track, with its prominent use of the Bo Diddley beat, was one of the first international disco hits and reached number 12 on the Billboard charts. It also made number one on the Billboard soul singles chart for one week. The phrases "got my sun roof down, got my diamond in the back" appeared as "diamond in the back, sun roof top" in William DeVaughn's 1974 hit "Be Thankful for What You Got" and "one monkey don't stop no show" was used as the title of Honey Cone's 1971 hit "One Monkey Don't Stop No Show (Part 1)" and several others as far back as 1950.

"Shame, Shame, Shame" also stayed at number one on the Billboard disco/dance charts for four weeks. A full-length album, Shame, Shame, Shame was subsequently recorded and released in 1975.

== Charts ==
=== Weekly charts ===
Chart (1974–75)	Peak position
Australia (Kent Music Report)	16
Austria (Ö3 Austria Top 40)	1
Belgium (Ultratop Flanders)	1
Belgium (Ultratop Wallonia)	2
Canada Top Singles (RPM)	3
Netherlands (Dutch Top 40)	1
Netherlands (Single Top 100)	1
New Zealand (Recorded Music NZ)	5
Norway (VG-lista)	9
South Africa (Springbok Radio)	3
Switzerland (Schweizer Hitparade)	2
UK Singles (OCC)	6
US Billboard Hot 100	12
US Disco/Dance (Billboard)	1
US Hot Soul Singles (Billboard)	1
US Cash Box Top 100	8
West Germany (Media Control Charts)	1

=== Year-end charts ===
Chart (1975)	Rank
Australia (Kent Music Report)	82
Canada Top Singles (RPM)	55
Netherlands (Dutch Top 40)	15
New Zealand (Recorded Music NZ)	26
Switzerland (Schweizer Hitparade)	12
West Germany (Media Control Charts)	11

== Cover versions ==
Linda Fields & the Funky Boys recorded a version, sounding nearly identical and released it as a single in 1975; it was re-released in 1983 as a 12" EP. The version appears on several disco compilation albums and is often confused with the original. Their version charted concurrently with the original in New Zealand, reaching number 24.

Ike & Tina Turner recorded a version that was released on the 1980 album The Edge, it reached number 27 on the Billboard Disco chart. In 1982, the song was released as a single in Europe and peaked at number 47 in the Netherlands. Tina would sing the song with Cher for the latter's variety show in 1975.

In 1974 French singer Henri Salvador recorded a parody, titled J'aime tes genoux (I like your knees).

In September 2025 the Rolling Stones released a cover version that originated as an outtake from their 1976 Black and Blue album, that also featured regular backup vocalist Chanel Haynes.

== Izabella Scorupco version ==
"Shame, Shame, Shame"

Single by Izabella Scorupco

from the album Iza
- Released: 1992
- Genre: Pop; disco
- Length: 3:50
- Label: Virgin
- Songwriter: Sylvia Robinson
- Producer: Christian Falk

Izabella Scorupco singles chronology
"Brando Moves" (1991)	"Shame, Shame, Shame" (1992)

Music video
- "Shame, Shame, Shame" on YouTube

Polish-Swedish singer, actress and model Izabella Scorupco recorded a successful cover version of "Shame, Shame, Shame" in 1992 by Virgin Records, which was accompanied by a black-and-white music video directed by Swedish director Jonas Åkerlund. It was produced by record producer and musician Christian Falk and became a chart hit in a number of European countries. In Norway and Sweden, it reached number two. The single was a top-10 hit also in Belgium, Denmark and the Netherlands, where it peaked at number four and six. It appears on an extended version of her 1991 album, Iza.

=== Track listing ===
12" single, Sweden (1992)
No.	Title	Length
1.	"Shame, Shame, Shame" (Spicy Mix)
2.	"Shame, Shame, Shame" (DSP Mix)
3.	"Shame, Shame, Shame" (Extended Version)

CD single, UK (1992)
No.	Title	Length
1.	"Shame, Shame, Shame"	3:50
2.	"Shame, Shame, Shame" (Karaoke Version)	3:50

=== Charts ===
==== Weekly charts ====
Chart (1992)	Peak position
Austria (Ö3 Austria Top 40)	22
Belgium (Ultratop 50 Flanders)	4
Denmark (IFPI)	6
Europe (Eurochart Hot 100)	24
Germany (Official German Charts)	37
Netherlands (Dutch Top 40)	6
Netherlands (Single Top 100)	7
Norway (VG-lista)	2
Switzerland (Schweizer Hitparade)	39
Sweden (Sverigetopplistan)	2

==== Year-end charts ====
Chart (1992)	Position
Belgium (Ultratop Flanders)	46
Netherlands (Dutch Top 40)	39
Netherlands (Single Top 100)	58

== Sinitta version ==
"Shame, Shame, Shame"

Single by Sinitta

from the album Naughty Naughty
- B-side: "Maybe Someday"
- Released: 1992
- Genre: Pop; soul
- Length: 4:00
- Label: Arista
- Songwriter: Sylvia Robinson
- Producers: Mark Taylor; Terry Adams

Sinitta singles chronology
"Love and Affection" (1990)	"Shame, Shame, Shame" (1992)	"Aquarius" (1993)

Music video
- "Shame, Shame, Shame" on YouTube

In 1992, the song was also covered by British singer Sinitta and was released as a single by Arista Records. It was produced by Mark Taylor and Terry Adams, and peaked at number 28 in the UK Singles Chart. "Shame, Shame, Shame" was later included on her third studio album, Naughty Naughty (1995).

=== Critical reception ===
Alan Jones from Music Week called the song "light, frothy, bouncy concentrated pop. A substantial hit."

=== Charts ===
Chart (1992)	Peak position
Australia (ARIA)	135
Europe (Eurochart Hot 100)	87
Ireland (IRMA)	30
UK Singles (OCC)	28
UK Airplay (Music Week)	25
UK Dance (Music Week)	58
UK Club Chart (Music Week)	80

== See also ==
- List of number-one hits of 1975 (Germany)
- List of number-one dance singles of 1975 (U.S.)
- List of number-one R&B singles of 1975 (U.S.)
