= All Platinum Records =

US record label

- Type: Thereto
- Industry: record label
- Founded: 1967; United States
- Founder: Sylvia Robinson; Joe Robinson
- Fate: Active; Tax Dormitory: Sold to WMG, UMG and DMG
- Headquarters: United States
- Total assets: US$6.6million
- Parent: WMG (1985-present); UMG (1985-present); DMG (1985-present)

All Platinum Records was a record company started in 1967 by singer/writer/producer Sylvia Robinson and her husband, businessman Joe Robinson, who had previously worked in the recording industry.

All Platinum and its subsidiary labels, including Stang, Vibration, Turbo and Astroscope, specialized in soul and R&B music. Many of the company's releases were recorded at its Soul Sound Studios, using the company's in-house musicians, at its Englewood, New Jersey base. The company released four singles that reached number one on the Billboard R&B chart but failed to top the Hot 100 pop chart.

== Background ==
The label started as Platinum Records but the prefix of 'All' was added to avoid confusion with a Miami label. The company, with Sylvia helming the creative operations as well as producing or co-producing many releases, racked up a series of R&B and Pop hits during the 70s, despite being only a small independent concern.

The company's mainstay act was the all-male group, The Moments (later Ray, Goodman & Brown) whose first hit at the end of 1968 launched the Stang label, "Not On The Outside" (#13 Billboard R&B, #57 pop). The group, with a few early personnel changes, stayed with the company for ten years, resulting in over 25 R&B hits and 15 Hot 100 entries. These included the million-seller, "Love on a Two-Way Street" in 1970 (#1 R&B, #3 pop) and another R&B chart-topper, "Look at Me (I'm in Love)", which also reached #39 on the pop chart in 1975. The group's Harry Ray and Al Goodman branched out as writers and producers in their later years at the company.

Other major hits for the All-Platinum labels included Sylvia's own million-selling "Pillow Talk" in 1973 (#1 R&B, #3 pop); Shirley & Company's "Shame, Shame, Shame" in 1975 (#1 R&B, #12 pop); Donnie Elbert's version of "Where Did Our Love Go" in 1971 (#6 R&B, #15 pop); Brother To Brother's "In The Bottle" in 1974 (#9 R&B, #46 pop); Linda Jones' "Your Precious Love" in 1972 (#15 R&B, #74 pop); and The Whatnauts' 1971 hit, "I'll Erase Away Your Pain" (#14 R&B, #71 pop).

The Moments also had considerable success in the UK with three Top 10 hits including "Girls" (#3) in 1975 and All Platinum also had its own label in the UK for a few years during the mid-1970s.

== History ==
In 1971, the label was handling the distribution for Maple Records. One record was the Two Great Experiences Together! album by Jimi Hendrix & Lonnie Youngblood which made the Billboard Top LPs chart.

A group called Calender had a single "Hypertension" released on All Platinum 6146 308 in the UK. Making its first appearance in the Record Mirror UK disco chart on August 9, 1975 "Hypertension" got to no. 10, spending a total of four weeks in the chart. It made it into the Cash Box R&B chart, peaking at no. 94 on August 30, spending a total of four weeks in the chart. It also made the Billboard Soul chart in 1975.

Retta Young had a hit with "Sending Out An S.O.S." which made its debut in the UK chart at no. 50. It peaked at no. 28 at the end of June, spending a total of seven weeks in the chart.

All Platinum purchased Chess Records with assistance from the European record concern, PolyGram in 1975, after Chess fell into bankruptcy. However, the move was not a success as All Platinum was unable to keep steadily releasing material from Chess's roster of artists.

The Robinsons launched a new subsidiary label, Sugar Hill Records in 1979 to concentrate on the fast-emerging rap/hip hop music scene. Sylvia switched her efforts to the new label completely, following early major success with "Rapper's Delight" (1979) and then "The Message" (1982), as the company's other labels went quiet. Sugar Hill as a label came to an end in 1986 after a disagreement with distributors MCA resulted in protracted litigation.

== Later years ==
The Robinsons maintained their studio operation through to 2002 when the Englewood studios (by then, renamed Sugar Hill Studios) burned down in a fire. Joe Robinson had died two years earlier and then Sylvia died in hospital in 2011 at the age of 75.

== Artists ==
- Jesus Alvarez
- Hank Ballard
- Brook Benton
- Brother to Brother
- Calender
- Dorian Corey and the Pearl Box Review
- Dave "Baby" Cortez
- Donnie Elbert
- First Class
- Chuck Jackson
- Linda Jones
- George Kerr
- Derek Martin
- Eleanore Mills
- The O'Jays
- The Good Rats ( One Album only- "Ratcity in Blue")
- Bobby Patterson
- Ponderosa Twins Plus One
- The Moments
- Irene Reed
- The Rimshots
- Shirley & Company
- Larry Saunders
- Spoonbread
- Sylvia
- Lezli Valentine
- The Whatnauts
- Willie & The Mighty Magnificents
- Timothy Wilson
- Retta Young
- Lonnie Youngblood

== See also ==
- List of record labels
