= Shirley & Lee =

American musical duo

- Origin: New Orleans, Louisiana, U.S.
- Genres: R&B; New Orleans soul
- Years active: 1952–1963, 1972–1974
- Labels: Aladdin, Warwick, Imperial
- Past members: Shirley Goodman; Leonard Lee; Lou "Ludie" Washington

Shirley & Lee were an American musical duo active during the 1950s and 1960s, consisting of Shirley Goodman and Leonard Lee. They had R&B hits with their songs "Feel So Good," "Let the Good Times Roll," and "I Feel Good."

== Career ==
Shirley Goodman (June 19, 1936 – July 5, 2005) and Leonard Lee (June 29, 1936 – October 23, 1976) were both born and raised in New Orleans. While attending Joseph Clark High School, they recorded a demo for "I'm Gone," a song Lee wrote, at Cosimo Matassa's studio in New Orleans. Eddie Mesner, the owner of Aladdin Records, heard the demo and asked Matassa to locate Goodman. Initially her religious grandmother was hesitant for her to record R&B and blues music, but after he offered her $1,000 she allowed Goodman to sign with Aladdin. Goodman and Lee re-recorded the song with producer Dave Bartholomew. Released in late 1952, their debut single reached No. 2 on the Billboard's R&B National Best Sellers chart in January 1953.

Although Shirley & Lee were never a couple, the duo became known as "the Sweethearts of the Blues" due to the romantic sagas in their songs. Leaning on the contrast of Lee's deep voice and Goodman's higher voice, they recorded songs that conveyed a love affair. "Shirley's Back" was the second sequel to "I'm Gone", after "Shirley, Come Back to Me". As reviewed in Billboard (June 20, 1953): "The cycle's completed. First she left; then Lee pleaded for her return; finally she's back and happiness reigns."

Still just teenagers when they found success, Goodman's grandmother chaperoned her while they toured with Big Mama Thorton as her opening act. Nightclubs often stopped serving alcohol when they performed due to their age. They reached No. 2 on the R&B chart with "Feel So Good", (not to be confused with their later single "I Feel Good"), in 1955. Their biggest hit "Let the Good Times Roll" topped the R&B chart in 1956 and peaked at No. 20 on the Pop chart. Their debut album, Let the Good Times Roll, was released that same year.

In 1959, Shirley & Lee moved to Warwick Records, where they ended up re-recording "Let the Good Times Roll." The duo were never able to duplicate the success of their biggest hit. They released their second album titled Let the Good Times Roll on Warwick in 1961. They recorded for Imperial Records before they split up in 1963. Nearly a decade later, they reunited for some concerts in 1972.

In 1974, Shirley & Lee appeared on the music show The Midnight Special.

Goodman returned to the charts in 1974 with her disco hit "Shame, Shame, Shame." She retired from the music industry in the late 1970s. After suffering a stroke in 1994, Goodman moved to California, and died on July 5, 2005, in Los Angeles.

Lee, who had become a social worker, died of a heart attack, aged 40 in 1976.

== Discography ==
=== Albums ===
- 1956: Let the Good Times Roll (Aladdin)
- 1961: Let the Good Times Roll (Warwick)

=== Singles ===
Year	Single	Chart positions	
Year	Single	US Pop	US R&B
1952	"I'm Gone"	—	2
1955	"Feel So Good"	—	2
1956	"Let the Good Times Roll"	20	1
1956	"I Feel Good"	38	3
1957	"When I Saw You"	—	14
1960	"I've Been Loved Before"	88	—
1960	"Let the Good Times Roll" (re-recording)	48	—
1961	"Well-A, Well-A"	77	—
"—" denotes releases that did not chart.
