= Let the Good Times Roll (Shirley and Lee song) =

Song recorded by Shirley and Lee in 1956

Single by Shirley and Lee

from the album Let the Good Times Roll
- A-side: "Let the Good Times Roll"
- B-side: "Do You Mean to Hurt Me So"
- Released: 1956
- Recorded: May 1956
- Studio: Cosimo (New Orleans, Louisiana)
- Genre: Rhythm and blues, Rock and roll
- Length: 2:30
- Label: Aladdin 3325
- Songwriters: Shirley Goodman, Leonard Lee

Shirley & Lee singles chronology
"Feel So Good" (1955)	"Let the Good Times Roll" (1956)	"I Feel Good" (1957)

"Let the Good Times Roll" is a song that was recorded by Shirley and Lee in 1956. This song was written by the duo, Shirley Goodman (later Shirley Pixley) and Leonard Lee.

== Chart performance ==
By September 8, 1956, the Shirley & Lee recording had climbed to number 20 in the US chart, and a 1960 re-recording went to number 47.

== Background ==
The song has a steady beat provided by prolific studio drummer Earl Palmer.

== Notable cover versions ==
- Roy Orbison covered the song in 1965; it was included on his album Orbisongs and released as a single in 1966, peaking at #81 on the Billboard Hot 100. Orbison's version features Nashville session musician Charlie McCoy on harmonica.
- Rising Sons covered it in their 1966 eponymous album, which was only released in 1992 after its founders Taj Majal and Ry Cooder had become independently famous.
- Bunny Sigler covered it as a medley along with the song "Feel So Good", peaking at number 20 on the Top Selling R&B Singles chart and number 22 on the Billboard Hot 100 (1967)
- Harry Nilsson covered it on his 1971 album Nilsson Schmilsson.
- English rock band Slade covered it on their 1972 album Slayed? and released it as a single in the US in 1973. It reached number 14 on the Billboard Bubbling Under the Hot 100.

== Popular culture ==
"Let the Good Times Roll" has appeared on numerous compilation albums, and features in the films Apocalypse Now, Stand By Me, October Sky, A Father for Brittany, Nobody, and Manchester by the Sea, as well as the trailer for the film The Monkey.

Bob Dylan references the song in the lyrics of New Danville Girl; "Somethin’ about it reminds me of you, like when she sings “Baby, let the good times roll”." The same year that "New Danville Girl" was released on Knocked Out Loaded, Dylan added "Let the Good Times Roll" to his setlists and played it four times. The earliest known extant recording by Dylan, from 1956, includes a performance of the song.

== Commercial usage ==
The song appears in a 2018 TV commercial for Walmart.
