= Helene & gänget =

Swedish dansband

- Origin: Kristianstad, Sweden
- Genres: dansband music
- Years active: 1990–2002

Helene & gänget was a dansband in Kristianstad in Sweden, founded 1990 by members of the Färmarna dansband. The band broke through in 1995 with the album Segla din båt i hamn. The band broke up in 2002 and its singer Helene Persson begun acting as SR Kristianstad programme host. Famous songs recorded by the band are Segla din båt i hamn, En korg med blommor and Nånstans så finns du.

== Members ==
- Helene Persson - vocals (1990-2002)
- Henric Svensson - keyboard (1990-1994)
- Lars Färm - guitar (1990-1996)
- Magnus Olsson - drums (1990-2002)
- Roland Andersson - bass (1990-2002)
- Fredrik Jansson - keyboard, accordion, vocals (1994-1998)
- Ulf Nilsson - guitar (1996-1997)
- Mattias Olofsson - guitar (1997-2002)
- Magnus Persson - keyboard, accordion, vocals (1998-2002)

== Discography ==
=== Albums ===
- Segla din båt i hamn - 1995
- Det är du som är livet - 1997
- Helene & gänget - 1998
- Som ett ljus - 2000

=== Compilation albums ===
- Stå på egna ben - 1996
- Gløm inte bort - 1998
- Nånstans så finns du - 2001

=== EP's ===
- Strunta i etiketten - 1993

=== Singles ===
- Sticka iväg/Vinden har vänt - 1990
- Jag sjunger för dej (I Write You a Love Song) - 1991
- Enkel resa/Jag sjunger för dej (I Write You a Love Song) - 1991
- Vindens sång/drömmar av guld - 1993
- Segla din båt i hamn/Om du ger mig tid - 1994
- Nyckeln till mitt hjärta/Rätt eller fel - 1997
- En korg med blommor/Om man tar varje dag som den kommer - 1997
- Över land, över hav/En man för en kvinna som jag - 2001
- Så speglas kärleken/Fågel, fisk & mittemellan - 2002

== Svensktoppen songs ==
- Varje morgondag - 1994
- Segla din båt i hamn - 1995
- Stå på egna ben - 1995
- Glöm inte bort - 1996-1997
- En korg med blommor - 1997
- Det är du som är livet - 1997
- Mitt livs lyckligaste sommar - 1998
- En enda fråga - 1999
- Som ett ljus - 1999-2000
- En liten, liten bit - 2000
- Låt ödet styra - 2000
- Nånstans så finns du - 2000
- Över land, över hav - 2001
- Så speglas kärleken - 2002

== Failed to enter Svensktoppen ==
- Jag sjunger för dig -1991
- Drömmar av guld-1992
- Du får mig att längta - 1998
