= Shirley & Company =

American disco group

- Genres: Disco
- Years active: 1974–1976
- Labels: Vibration, All Platinum
- Past members: Shirley Goodman; Jason Alvarez; Walter Morris; Bernadette Randle; Seldon Powell; Jonathan Williams; Kenny Jeremiah; Clarence Oliver

Shirley & Company was an American disco group, consisting of Shirley Goodman (1936–2005), Jason Alvarez, Walter Morris, Bernadette Randle, Seldon Powell, Jonathan Williams, Kenny Jeremiah, and Clarence Oliver.

They topped the U.S. Dance chart in 1975 with "Shame, Shame, Shame" (U.S. Pop #12), and did extremely well in Europe: the song reached #6 in the UK Singles Chart and #1 in Austria, Belgium, Germany, and the Netherlands. The follow-up, "Cry Cry Cry", made it to #91 on the Hot 100 later that year.

== History ==
"Shame, Shame, Shame" was written and produced by Sylvia Robinson, who was a co-owner of the All Platinum record label. It was intended for All Platinum artist Donnie Elbert. It was Robinson who paired veteran blues vocalist Shirley Goodman with All Platinum artist Jesus Alvarez. The track, with its prominent use of the Bo Diddley beat, was one of the first international disco hits and reached number 12 on the Billboard charts. It also hit number one on the soul singles chart for one week. "Shame, Shame, Shame" also went number one on the disco/dance chart for four weeks. The full-length LP Shame, Shame, Shame was recorded subsequently and came out in 1975.

The lead singer Shirley Goodman, was one half of the duo Shirley and Lee who had a mega hit 18 years earlier, in 1956, writing and recording the song "Let the Good Times Roll" for Aladdin Records. Jesus Alvarez changed his name to Jason Alvarez and became a pastor for the Love of Jesus Family Church. He recorded several gospel albums.

== Discography ==
=== Albums ===
- Shame, Shame, Shame (Vibration, 1975)

=== Singles ===
Year	Title	Peak chart positions										Album
Year	Title	US	US R&B	US Dance	AUT	BEL	CHE	GER	NLD	NOR	UK	Album
1974	"Shame, Shame, Shame"	12	1	1	1	1	2	1	1	9	6	Shame, Shame Shame
1975	"Cry, Cry, Cry"	91	38	―	―	―	―	―	―	―	―	Shame, Shame Shame
1975	"I Like to Dance"	―	91	―	―	―	―	―	―	―	―	Non-album track
1975	"Disco Shirley"	―	―	―	―	27	―	41	12	―	―	Shame, Shame, Shame
1975	"Mr. Frenchman"	―	―	―	―	―	―	―	―	―	―	All Platinum – Super Disco Show
"—" denotes releases that did not chart or were not released in that territory.

== See also ==
- List of number-one dance hits (United States)
- List of artists who reached number one on the US Dance chart
- List of 1970s one-hit wonders in the United States
- List of disco artists (S-Z)
- One-hit wonders in the UK
- List of performers on Top of the Pops
