= Teenage pregnancy in South Korea =

Teenage pregnancy in Korea carries a lot of stigma resulting in many abortions and adoptions. Very few pregnant teens keep the child because, along with stigma, it is very difficult for them to get help. The stigma can result in isolation from friends and family, expulsion from school, homelessness, and more. Teenagers are not legally allowed to make the decision of what to do with the pregnancy because the majority are underage and need their parents consent. Nineteen is the legal age of adulthood where they could decide for themselves. Parents often choose abortion or adoption rather than keeping the child even if the teenager wanted. Some who want to keep the child often end up hiding it or planning to run away to avoid the stigma and opinions of those around them.

== Education ==
The education about pregnancy was at first virginity education which was taught for a few hours throughout elementary school. It was targeting primarily girls to ensure they do not have intercourse before marriage. A large emphasis was put on marriage and family values. There was a gap in the sex education about safe sex then but now it is in the middle school curriculum. School was a very isolating place for pregnant teenagers because friends isolate them and they faced discrimination from the teachers. When teachers and principals found out about pregnancies they would either tell the student to voluntarily drop out or they would be expelled. After this they were not allowed back into schools and therefore could not further their education. Factors have been put in place by the National Human Rights Commission of Korea to prevent punishment of pregnant students in schools. There was also a push to educate pregnant teenagers by allowing them to continue school as well as attend classes in shelters.

== Abortion and Adoption ==
Abortion was criminalized in South Korea except for two occasions: assault and health risk. With this 79% of teenage pregnancies still ended in abortion. Upon finding out the age or unwed status many healthcare providers would suggest choosing abortion or adoption. As compensation there was also aid for women when they chose adoptions.

== Jobs ==
There is stigma in the workplace around pregnancy. Pregnant teenagers are more likely to come from low income families and are not typically financially stable. Pregnant women are often fired and replaced with someone else. Birth-mothers have a hard time finding work because there is not readily access to childcare for single mothers. This can result in the family living in shelters. One form of assistance is from the government but it is not much. It is a living wage but has strict requirements for who is accepted.

== See also ==
- High School Daddy: a television program in South Korea
