= Pregnancy school =

Type of school in the United States exclusively for pregnant girls

Pregnancy school is a type of school in the United States exclusively for pregnant girls. New York City, among other cities and states, opened a series of these schools in the 1960s and moved pregnant girls out of their regular high schools into these special schools. As of May 2007, the city is planning on shutting these schools down due to a history of low test scores and poor attendance.

Pregnancy schools also exist in places such as Chicago, Los Angeles, Utah, and Florida, although attendance has been declining in all of them.

== Rationale ==
Many educators who have become founders of these schools see many factors that point toward a demand for pregnancy schools in America. Fans of literature can note some of society's harshest feelings preserved in The Scarlet Letter by Nathaniel Hawthorne, and that book is dated from 1850. What motivates the various personalities who go on to create these schools is that they believe not much has changed since Hawthorne's time when one considers the harassment and gossip a pregnant girl may have to endure in a modern high school. In addition, with the everyday burdens of being pregnant such as morning sickness and weekly pre-natal appointments, people who are sympathetic to these young women want to help to use resources available to them.

== General characteristics ==
The biggest help all of these schools have to offer is their daycare centers, where students may drop their babies off while they attend class. However, many schools provide a variety of other health services, depending on outside funding they may receive. These services may include, but are not limited to: prenatal and postnatal care and management, preconception services for prevention of pregnancy and diseases, parenting education and counseling, HIV screening and counseling; also depending on the availability of appropriate facilities and doctors, baby-child examinations, immunizations, also management and treatment of acute and chronic illnesses.

=== New York ===
The New York public school system is trying to incorporate programs for pregnant girls inside their existing system. The earliest remaining schools were founded nearly 30 years ago, such as the Martha Nielsen School in the Bronx, and there may still be a demand, as the CDC reports "there are nine times as many teen mothers in America than in other developed countries". Although other reports have concluded that, at least in the state of New York, the schools should be shut down with the student population dwindling to its most recent enrollment of 323 students from 1,500 in the late 1960s. New York has struggled to find support and funding for these schools in addition to qualified educators to teach the required material for the students to truly earn their G.E.D. With activities like quilt sewing as a substitute for learning geometry, Cami Anderson, the superintendent whose district includes the Program for Pregnant Students acknowledges, “It’s a separate but unequal program.” Despite the separate schools being shut down, the Program for Pregnant Students still tries to offer women of the public school system contraceptives and academic help within the system that remains.

=== Chicago ===
Simpson Academy is a school in Chicago where women can transfer out of their public high schools and into a "constantly motivating" environment. As of 2011 there were 300 girls who are pregnant or parenting in grades 6 through 12 and in the past year, the academy has maintained a steady enrollment status. The main focus of this school seems to be moral support. Instead of feeling isolated, the pregnant students depend on each other for affirmation and motivation. This community-based environment helps the Simpson Academy stay effective in student attendance and large graduating classes.

=== Los Angeles ===
Los Angeles follows a similar structure to the New York school district in that there are alternative schools within the existing school district that cater to the student's needs. Pregnant minor schools consist of small campuses located throughout the District. Their primary goal is to provide interim educational opportunities to expectant mothers so that they may continue their education and be graduated. Schools provide counseling by school nurses, information on health and nutrition, and pre-natal and infant care instruction. There are other companies reaching out to the school system for added support and making more resources available to the district, like Student Health and Human Services. In 1994, The Teen Parent Program began providing advocacy, support services, and resource and referral information to assist pregnant and parenting students within the Los Angeles Unified School District. The program is a partnership between Student Health and Human Services (SHHS) and the Educational Equity Compliance Office (EECO) providing technical assistance to school and community agencies that work with teen parents. The partnership serves to assist the District in protecting the educational and civil rights of pregnant students and teen parents under federal Title IX and California law. Their website reads, "It is our goal to ensure equal access to the quality educational programs and support services that are critical to removing barriers to school success for young parents and their children."

=== Florida ===
Florida appears to be the state with the most private schools which are exclusive only to pregnant girls. St. Gerard Campus in St. Augustine, Florida is a school whose staff works especially hard for their students by providing counseling, baby supplies, and connections with adoption agencies. But St. Gerard does not stop at academics and health care, campus also serves as a non-profit maternity home for the pregnant teenagers. This unique residential program where mothers can live on campus with their child is helpful to mothers who struggle to find day care and is likely accomplished with private funding and donations that many other organizations who struggle going through the public school system, may never receive.

== Controversy ==
As of 2010, parenthood is the leading cause of teenage dropout rates. However, research from the Gates Foundation indicates that pregnant and parenting students who dropped out of school were performing well and felt capable of graduating, but were faced with lack of support and discrimination by adult educators and school officials.

The National Campaign to Prevent Teen and Unplanned Pregnancy stresses that children of uneducated parents are more likely to drop out of school themselves. “The relationship between education and teen pregnancy works both ways. That is, teen pregnancy often has a negative impact on education...” However they continue to argue that the problem is self healing. If these women can stay on the educational track they would consequently have more success, despite their first unplanned pregnancy, “It is also the case that school achievement, attendance, and involvement helps reduce the risk of teen pregnancy. Put another way, staying in school and getting an education helps prevent teen pregnancy.”

Some institutions have taken illegal action, like Louisiana's Delhi Charter school, which mandated pregnancy tests for all female students. In 2012 Delhi Charter School was made to drop its school ban on pregnant students and the ability to mandate pregnancy tests for students suspected of being pregnant on the grounds that the tests were a violation of Federal Law Title IX, discrimination, and an invasion of privacy. A petition created by Natasha Vianna, with over 126,000 signatures, brought national attention to the issue. According to the ACLU, 70 percent of pregnant teenagers leave school in part because of illegal discrimination.

== Programs ==
In addition to the programs mentioned above, there are research-based programs of social emotional intelligence and emotional regulation designed explicitly for teen parents.
