= Birth mothers in South Korea (international adoption) =

Post-Korean War practice

Birth mothers in South Korea (international adoption) refers to the group of biological mothers whose children were placed for adoption in South Korea's international adoption practice. The decades-long phenomenon of international adoption in South Korea began after the Korean War. In the years since the war, South Korea has become the largest and longest provider of children placed for international adoption, with 165,944 recorded Korean adoptees living in 14 countries, primarily in North America and Western Europe, as of 2014.

Birth mothers in South Korea faced social and economic hardships following the war, and many were left with no choice but to place their children for adoption. It was virtually impossible for unwed mothers to raise children on their own in South Korea, due to social exclusion and an inability to escape severe stigma and discrimination. Many found shelter in maternity homes, which opened their doors for unwed pregnant women, but still struggled with grief and psychological effects of losing a child. Recently, there has been an uptick in birth mother activism, with birth mothers finding each other on online forums, through support groups, and on search and reunion television series.

== Aftermath of the Korean War ==
The Korean War (1950–1953) caused extensive damage to the economies and infrastructure of North and South Korea, including over 2.5 million casualties, or about 10% of Korea's pre-war population. The physical and emotional toll of the war had severe effects on the Korean population, most of which lived in extreme poverty following the war's end.

=== Effects of the Korean War on women ===
During the war, the US military established camptowns, or kijich'on, where Korean women became prostitutes for soldiers. By 1953, there were 350,000 women working as prostitutes in or near camptowns. Some made contract marriage arrangements with US soldiers, in which soldiers would pay for sex workers' living expenses in exchange for a monogamous relationship. Viewed as the lowest class of sex workers, kijich'on women faced extreme amounts of social stigma during and after the war. Kijich'on women were called derogatory names, such as yanggongju, or "Yankee whore," and were seen as sexually deviant and morally corrupt.

Women who became pregnant in camptowns comprised the first generation of birth mothers: after the war, over 100,000 war orphans were left in need of a home. Many of their children were mixed-race, or honhyŏla, which led to social exclusion for both the mother and child. The mothers of mixed-race children were automatically seen as low-class military prostitutes, and their children were seen as illegitimate, with any drop of American blood invalidating their Korean blood. Both faced strong prejudices and were excluded from educational and occupational opportunities, which pressured many women to give up their children for adoption. Children of Korean women and African-American soldiers faced the most prejudice due to racist and nationalist sentiments. Due to their exclusion from Korean society at large, many mothers and their mixed-race children lived in extreme poverty following the war.

After the war, South Korea relied heavily on aid from faith-based foreign governments and organizations. Many foreign aid organizations helped to develop South Korea's child welfare and family planning policies, which had previously been nonexistent. The newly regulated family, which consisted of a father, mother, and one or two children, rendered single mothers, birth mothers, widows, divorcées, working-class mothers, poor mothers, and mixed-race children excess population. The nation's patrilineal family registration system, hojuje, only legally recognized women as a child's parent through the child's biological father. Because of this, it was difficult for women to separate themselves from abusive or unhealthy relationships for fear of losing custody of their child. In addition, kijich'on women, whose American partners had returned to the US after the war, were not recognized as the legal guardian of their child. If they were to raise them in South Korea, the child would legally be seen as illegitimate.

=== Beginnings of international adoption ===
In 1960, Holt International Children's Services (then known as Holt Adoption Placement) was established by Harry and Bertha Holt, an American Protestant couple that played a large role in the development of the transnational adoption process. In 1954, Holt watched Lost Sheep, a documentary about South Korea's post-war devastation. The film showed footage of the war-torn environment, including imagery of millions of orphans wandering lost and abandoned in a desolate Korean landscape. After seeing Lost Sheep, Holt felt that he had found his life's God-given mission: to adopt South Korean orphans. He adopted 8 mixed-race children in 1955, believing that they should be returned to the land of their fathers. These children became Korea's first transnational adoptees.

The South Korean government benefitted from the adoption of mixed-race children because it helped rid the country of what were largely considered "undesirable" children. At the suggestion of the government, South Korean newspapers began to publish advertisements to recruit mixed-race children for adoption. Both the South Korean government and foreign aid organizations, such as Holt Adoption Placement, encouraged the prioritization of mixed-race adoption first. In 1978, the South Korean government took control of the Korean branch of Holt. Subsequently, the number of adoptions increased, with 8,837 children being sent abroad in 1985.

Many American couples followed suit, either sponsoring a child from the US by sending letters and money, or by adopting. After the adoption papers were signed, birth mothers who gave up their children became legally nonexistent, allowing adoptive parents to take full custody of the child. The South Korean government benefitted from the legal erasure of birth mothers, as it upheld the patriarchal family unit and rid the population of socially deviant women. The international adoption practice was also a means of population control through the regulation of women's reproductive agency.

== Maternity homes ==
Many birth mothers turned to maternity homes for support and services. Maternity homes are social service facilities for pregnant women that operated in conjunction with foreign aid agencies, the church, and adoption agencies. All maternity homes in South Korea were run by private Christian organizations, which declared adoption as an "act of God's love" and a path to salvation. Kusekun Yŏchakwan, or the Salvation Army's Women's Center, was the first maternity home, established in 1926 during Japanese occupation. Initially, Kusekun Yŏchakwan offered shelter to prostitutes and homeless women, and later opened their doors to unmarried pregnant women in 1966. In 1960, an American Presbyterian missionary, Eleanor Creswell Van Lierop, established Ae Ran Won, or House of Grace, as a maternity home for kijich'on women. In 1979, Maliaŭi Chip, or the House of Mary, was founded by a Catholic organization. By the mid-2000s, there were 18 maternity homes that offered services for unwed pregnant women.

=== Ae Ran Won ===
Ae Ran Won is located in Seoul, South Korea, and remains one of the more prominent maternity homes. It was founded with the goal of helping young, vulnerable women who moved to Seoul in search of work. Each year, around 200 birth mothers stay at Ae Ran Won. 85% of them choose to give up their children for adoption.

At maternity homes, women could receive shelter and resources. Ae Ran Won offered services such as sex education, vocational training, medical care, and counseling. Because the maternity homes were so closely tied with adoption agencies, adoption was presented as the best option for birth mothers. Maternity homes regularly received compensation from adoption agencies for encouraging women to choose adoption. Pregnant women were strongly dissuaded from turning to abortion. Adoption agency staffers would often come to maternity homes and lead workshops with pregnant women, encouraging them to choose to put their child up for adoption. In their educational programming, maternity homes used religious instruction and many references to their Christian faith. Church representatives asked women in maternity homes to pray, attend weekly Bible study classes, and pledge to refrain from marital sex. Anti-abortion sermons were delivered, and women were forbidden from returning to maternity homes with their newborn children. Under these circumstances, it was very difficult for birth mothers to choose any option other than adoption.

In I Wish for You a Beautiful Life, a collection of letters from birth mothers at Ae Ran Won to their children, most birth mothers expressed their own guilt, grief, and sorrow. Many expressed that they had chosen to give up their child for adoption with the hopes that they would have access to better opportunities, education, and mobility. Some acknowledged the stigma that would accompany their life as a single, unwed mother and the life of their child, who would be rendered legally illegitimate, writing that they wanted to prevent their children from facing this social exclusion. Most, if not all, sought forgiveness and strength through faith.

== Birth mother activism ==
=== Online forums ===
The Internet represented a new opportunity for birth mothers to find community through shared experiences. In 2001, an Internet café, called A Sad Love Story of Mothers Who Sent Their Children Away for Adoption, became a popular place among birth mothers to share their stories, foster community, and process emotions. It was established by user "Jaewon", a 25-year old birth mother who had researched adoption in the years after she had given up her child. After meeting another birth mother in 2001, she felt compelled to create a space for other birth mothers to find each other, learn about adoption, and have a safe space to share their experiences. From 2001 until 2005, A Sad Love Story of Mothers operated regularly, hosting online chat rooms, postings, and motivating some mothers to meet in person. After 2005, the site's membership slowly decreased, and eventually it became inactive.

=== TV reunions ===
Television search and reunion shows, which seek to reunite birth mothers and their biological children, saw an increase in popularity among South Koreans beginning in the 1990s. Transnational adoptees who were coming of age began searching for their biological families, using the mass media to help in their searches. One popular show, Ach’im Madang, or I Want to Find This Person, was created in 1997, and hosts adoptees who wish to find their birth families, aiding in the search and eventually culminating in a reunion between the mother and child. The reunions themselves were highly publicized, and both the mother and child's reactions were filmed. There are debates about whether or not this emotional reunion should be so public, so as not to invade the privacy of the families.

=== Activist groups ===
Many birth mothers have recently been speaking out against the negative stigma toward unwed single mothers. One birth mother, Choi Hyong-sook, chose to raise her son alone. As a result, she was cut off from her family, and had severe difficulties finding a job. Choi has since been a leader in creating unwed mothers' associations, where birth mothers can join to protest the South Korean government's policies regarding adoption. The government established National Adoption Day on 11 May 2005 in an attempt to encourage domestic adoption. Choi and other birth mothers protested National Adoption Day by marching in a parade with other unwed mothers' organizations, defending the right of single mothers to raise their own children.

Civil groups have come together to establish Single Mother's Day on 11 May, the same day as National Adoption Day. The goal is to celebrate single mothers and unwed birth mothers in a push to end social stigma and pressure the government to provide more financial support to unwed mothers, instead of focusing on funding orphanages and adoption agencies. Every year on Single Mother's Day, groups of activists, volunteers, birth mothers, and adoptees come together to show solidarity for the single mothers and the adoption community.

In addition, the Korean Unwed Mothers Support Network, started by American adoptive father Richard Boas, advocates for better-funded welfare services from the South Korean government. Another organization, Truth and Reconciliation for the Adoption Community in Korea (TRACK), was established by Korean-born adoptees who wish to return to Korea and reduce the stigma around single mothers. TRACK aims to protect the human rights of adoptees and their families, especially children's rights to know and live with their family of origin.
