= Jody Watley discography =

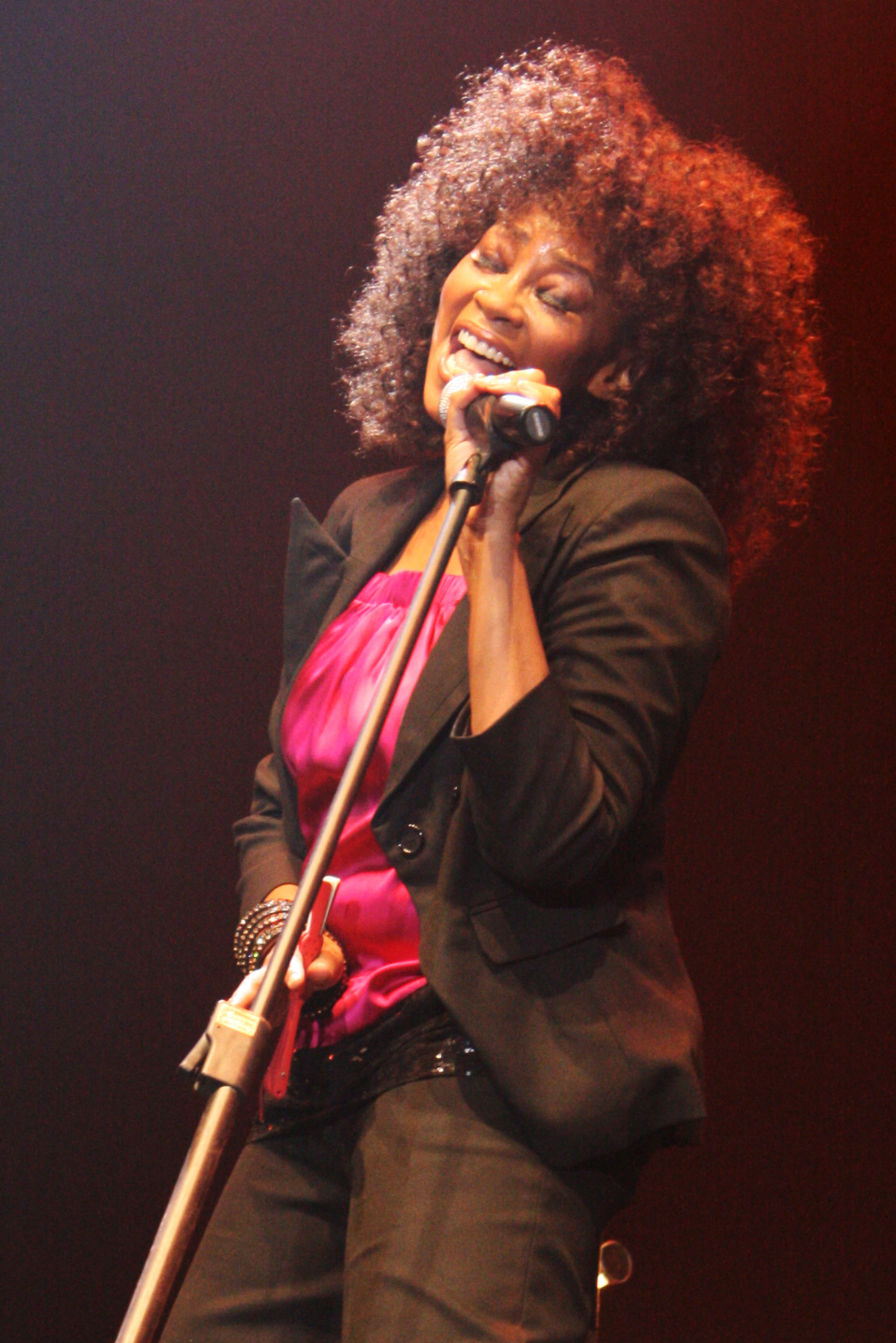
- Studio albums: 9
- Extended plays: 1
- Live albums: 1
- Compilation albums: 2
- Singles: 24
- Video albums: 2
- Music videos: 20
- Remix albums: 2

This is the discography documenting albums and singles released by American singer Jody Watley.

== Albums ==
=== Studio albums ===
List of albums, with selected chart positions
Title	Album details	Peak chart positions										Sales	Certifications
Title	Album details	US	US R&B	AUS	CAN	GER	JPN	NLD	NZ	SWE	UK	Sales	Certifications
Jody Watley	Released: February 23, 1987; Label: MCA; Formats: CD, LP, cassette, digital download, streaming	10	1	94	17	—	—	—	23	—	62		RIAA: Platinum; MC: Gold
Larger Than Life	Released: March 27, 1989; Label: MCA; Format: CD, LP, cassette, digital download, streaming	16	5	96	22	63	75	59	—	31	39		RIAA: Gold; MC: Gold
Affairs of the Heart	Released: December 3, 1991; Label: MCA; Format: CD, LP, cassette, digital download, streaming	124	21	174	—	—	53	—	—	—	—		
Intimacy	Released: November 9, 1993; Label: MCA; Format: CD, LP, cassette, digital download, streaming	164	38	180	—	—	43	—	—	—	—	US: 113,000	
Affection	Released: July 11, 1995; Label: Avitone/Bellmark-Life; Format: CD, LP, cassette, digital download, streaming	—	59	—	—	—	69	—	—	—	—		
Flower	Released: March 31, 1998; Label: Atlantic; Format: CD, LP, cassette, digital download, streaming	—	—	—	—	—	—	—	—	—	—		
The Saturday Night Experience Volume 1	Released: November 17, 1999; Label: Avitone; Format: CD, digital download	—	—	—	—	—	—	—	—	—	—		
Midnight Lounge	Released: April 24, 2001; Label: Avitone; Format: CD, digital download, streaming	—	—	—	—	—	—	—	—	—	—		
The Makeover	Released: August 8, 2006; Label: Avitone; Format: CD, digital download, streaming	—	—	—	—	—	—	—	—	—	—		
"—" denotes a recording that did not chart or was not released in that territory.

=== Live albums ===
Title	Album details
Super Hits Live	Released: August 28, 2007; Label: Sony BMG; Format: CD

=== Compilation albums ===
Title	Album details
Beginnings	Released: August 1, 1989; Label: SOLAR; Format: CD, LP, cassette
Greatest Hits	Released: February 13, 1996; Label: MCA; Format: CD, digital download, streaming
20th Century Masters – The Millennium Collection: The Best of Jody Watley	Released: December 19, 2000; Label: MCA; Format: CD, digital download, streaming

=== Remix albums ===
List of remix albums, with selected chart positions
Title	Album details	Peak chart positions			
Title	Album details	US	US R&B	JPN	RSA
You Wanna Dance with Me?	Released: October 26, 1989; Label: MCA; Format: CD, LP, cassette, digital download	86	48	95	19
Remixes of Love	Released: June 6, 1994; Label: MCA; Format: CD	—	—	—	—
"—" denotes a recording that did not chart or was not released in that territory.

== EPs ==
Title	EP details
Paradise	Released: July 28, 2014; Label: Avitone; Format: CD, digital download
Sanctuary	Released: April 10, 2017; Label: Avitone; Format: CD, digital download
Winter Nights EP	Released: February 7, 2020; Label: Avitone; Format: CD, digital download
Renderings: The Alex Di Ciò Remixes	Released: October 22, 2021; Label: Avitone; Format: CD, digital download

== Singles ==
Title	Year	Peak chart positions										Certifications	Album
Title	Year	US	US Dance	US R&B	AUS	CAN	GER	NLD	NZ	SWI	UK	Certifications	Album
"Where the Boys Are"	1984	—	—	—	—	—	—	—	—	—	127		Non-album singles
"Girls Night Out"	1985	—	—	—	—	—	—	—	—	—	—		Non-album singles
"Looking for a New Love"	1987	2	1	1	13	1	25	37	5	11	13	MC: Gold	Jody Watley
"Still a Thrill"	1987	56	8	3	—	—	—	—	46	—	77		Jody Watley
"Don't You Want Me"	1987	6	1	3	—	24	—	—	46	—	55		Jody Watley
"Some Kind of Lover"	1988	10	1	3	—	47	—	—	—	—	81		Jody Watley
"Most of All"	1988	60	8	11	—	—	—	90	—	—	—		Jody Watley
"Real Love"	1989	2	1	1	78	2	15	21	35	21	31	RIAA: Gold	Larger Than Life
"Friends" (featuring Eric B. & Rakim)	1989	9	7	3	146	11	45	25	31	20	21		Larger Than Life
"Everything"	1989	4	—	3	143	11	—	—	—	—	74		Larger Than Life
"What'cha Gonna Do for Me"	1989	—	—	—	—	—	—	—	—	—	—		Larger Than Life
"Precious Love"	1990	87	—	51	—	—	—	—	—	—	97		Larger Than Life
"I Want You"	1991	61	17	5	—	—	—	—	—	—	—		Affairs of the Heart
"I'm the One You Need"	1992	19	3	23	—	32	—	64	—	—	50		Affairs of the Heart
"It All Begins with You"	1992	—	—	80	—	—	—	—	—	—	—		Affairs of the Heart
"Your Love Keeps Working on Me"	1993	100	2	26	188	—	—	—	—	—	—		Intimacy
"Ecstasy"	1993	—	—	—	—	—	—	—	—	—	—		Intimacy
"Too Shy to Say"	1993	—	—	—	—	—	—	—	—	—	—		Intimacy
"When a Man Loves a Woman"	1994	— (Note: "When a Man Loves a Woman" did not enter the Billboard Hot 100, but peaked at number 15 on the Bubbling Under Hot 100.)	8	11	—	—	—	—	—	—	33		Intimacy
"Affection"	1995	— (Note: "Affection" did not enter the Billboard Hot 100, but peaked at number 18 on the Bubbling Under Hot 100.)	—	28	—	—	—	—	—	—	—		Affection
"Off the Hook" (featuring Rakim)	1998	73	1	23	—	—	—	—	44	—	51		Flower
"If I'm Not in Love"	1998	—	2	—	—	—	—	—	—	—	—		Flower
"I Love to Love" (featuring Roy Ayers)	2000	—	—	—	—	—	—	—	—	—	—		Midnight Lounge
"Saturday Night Experience"	2001	—	—	—	—	—	—	—	—	—	—		Midnight Lounge
"Photographs"	2001	—	—	—	—	—	—	—	—	—	—		Midnight Lounge
"Whenever"	2003	—	19	—	—	—	—	—	—	—	—		Midnight Lounge
"Looking for a New Love '05"	2005	—	1	—	—	—	—	—	—	—	—		Non-album single
"Borderline"	2006	—	2	—	—	—	—	—	—	—	—		The Makeover
"I Want Your Love"	2007	—	1	—	—	—	—	—	—	—	—		The Makeover
"A Beautiful Life"	2008	—	5	—	—	—	—	—	—	—	—		The Makeover
"Candlelight"	2009	—	26	—	—	—	—	—	—	—	—		Non-album single
"Nightlife"	2013	—	18	—	—	—	—	—	—	—	—		Paradise
"—" denotes a recording that did not chart or was not released in that territory.

=== Featured singles ===
Single	Year	Peak chart positions						Certifications	Album
Single	Year	US	US R&B	AUS	NLD	NZ	UK	Certifications	Album
"This Is for the Lover in You" (Babyface featuring LL Cool J, Howard Hewett, Jody Watley, and Jeffrey Daniel)	1996	6	2	50	19	12	12	RIAA: Platinum	The Day

== Video compilations ==
Year	Title	Info	Certifications
Video Classics, Volume 1	Released: November 21, 1989; Label: MCA; Formats: VHS	Video compilation from 1987 to 1989	RIAA: Gold
Dance to Fitness	Released: April 26, 1990; Label: Inspired Corp.; Formats: VHS	Exercise video	

== Music videos ==
Year	Single	Director
1987	"Looking for a New Love"	Brian Grant
1987	"Still a Thrill"	Brian Grant
1987	"Don't You Want Me"	Dominic Sena
1987	"Some Kind of Lover"	Brian Grant
1988	"Most of All"	David Fincher
1989	"Real Love"	David Fincher
1989	"Friends" (featuring Eric B. & Rakim)	Jim Sonzero
1989	"Everything"	Victor Ginzburg
1990	"Precious Love"	Matthew Rolston
1990	"After You, Who?"	Matthew Rolston
1991	"I Want You"	Andy Morahan
1992	"I'm the One You Need"	Paula Greif
1992	"It All Begins with You"	
1993	"Your Love Keeps Working on Me"	Matthew Amos
1994	"When a Man Loves a Woman"	Jody Watley
1995	"Affection"	Jody Watley
1996	"This Is for the Lover in You" (with Babyface featuring LL Cool J, Howard Hewett, and Jeffrey Daniel)	Hype Williams
1998	"Off the Hook" (Original Mix)	Billie Woodruff
1998	"Off the Hook" (D-Dot Remix)	Yarrow
2006	"Borderline"	
2008	"A Beautiful Life"	
