= Greatest Hits (Jody Watley album) =

Greatest hits album by Jody Watley
- Released: February 13, 1996
- Recorded: 1986–1994
- Genre: R&B, pop, dance-pop
- Length: 62:00
- Label: MCA
- Producer: André Cymone, Bernard Edwards, David Morales, Francois Kevorkian

Jody Watley chronology
| Affection (1995) | Greatest Hits (1996) | Flower (1998) |

Professional ratings
Review scores
| Source | Rating |
|---|---|
| AllMusic | 4/5 stars |
| Cash Box | (favorable) |
| Entertainment Weekly | B |

Greatest Hits is the first "greatest hits" collection from American singer and songwriter Jody Watley. Executive-produced by Watley, the album highlights her MCA years (1987–1994) and contains all of her well-known pop hits, among them "Looking for a New Love", "Real Love" and "Everything"; two of Watley's classics, "Don't You Want Me" and "Some Kind of Lover", were presented in their more familiar remixed forms. Additionally, Watley (who compiled the collection with Andy McKaie) took care to include lesser-known songs like "Still a Thrill" and "Most of All".

== Track listing ==
1. "Looking for a New Love" (André Cymone, Jody Watley) (Single Mix)
2. "I Want You" (Cymone, Watley)
3. "Some Kind of Lover" (Cymone, Watley) (Dance Remix)
4. "Friends" (Cymone, Watley, Eric Barrier, William Griffin)
5. "Still a Thrill" (Cymone, Watley)
6. "Everything" (Gardner Cole, James Newton Howard)
7. "Don't You Want Me" (Franne Golde, David Paul Bryant, Watley) (Dance Remix)
8. "Your Love Keeps Working on Me" (John Barnes, Joey Diggs, Robert White)
9. "Most of All" (Pat Leonard, Cole)
10. "I'm the One You Need" (Watley, David Morales, Alec Shantzis)
11. "Ecstasy" (Watley, Morales, Terry Burrus) (Extended Dance Remix)
12. "When a Man Loves a Woman" (Larry Campbell, Watley) (PM Dawn Remix)
13. "Real Love" (Cymone, Watley)

== Credits ==
- Compilation: Jody Watley, Andy McKaie
- Art Direction: Vartan
- Photo research: Geary Chansley
- Photography: Guzman, Herb Ritts, Steven Meisel, Victoria Pearson
