= You Wanna Dance with Me? =

Remix album by Jody Watley
- Released: October 26, 1989
- Genre: Remix
- Length: 50:43
- Label: MCA
- Producer: André Cymone; Bernard Edwards; Victor Flores; François Kevorkian; Patrick Leonard; Jeff Lorber; David Z

Jody Watley chronology
Larger Than Life (1989)	You Wanna Dance with Me? (1989)	Affairs of the Heart (1991)

Professional ratings
Review scores
Source	Rating
Allmusic	2/5 stars
Robert Christgau	B−

You Wanna Dance with Me? is a remix album by American pop singer Jody Watley, released in October 1989. The album contains remixed versions of Watley's songs.

== Track listing ==
All tracks are written by André Cymone and Jody Watley, except where noted.

Side One
No.	Title	Writer(s)	Length
1.	"Still a Thrill"		5:30
2.	"Friends"	André Cymone, Jody Watley, Eric Barrier, William Griffin) (With Eric B. & Rakim	5:52
3.	"Looking for a New Love"		5:20
4.	"Real Love"		5:46
5.	"L.O.V.E.R."		5:28

Side Two
No.	Title	Writer(s)	Length
6.	"What'cha Gonna Do for Me"		5:35
7.	"Don't You Want Me"	Franne Golde, David Paul Bryant, Jody Watley	5:22
8.	"Most of All"	Patrick Leonard, David Paul Bryant	4:51
9.	"Some Kind of Lover"		6:59

== Personnel ==
- Jody Watley – vocals

== Production ==
- Producers: André Cymone, Bernard Edwards, Victor Flores, François Kevorkian, Patrick Leonard, Jeff Lorber, David Z.
- Remastering: Michael Hutchinson, François Kevorkian, Eric "Vietnam" Sadler, Paul Shabazz, Hank Shocklee, Louis Silas Jr.
- Art direction: Lynn Robb
- Design: Lynn Robb
- Photography: Steven Meisel

== Charts ==
Chart (1989)	Peak Position
South African Albums (RISA)	19
U.S. Billboard 200	86
U.S. Top R&B Albums	48
