= Larger than Life (Jody Watley album) =

Larger Than Life

Studio album by Jody Watley
- Released: March 27, 1989
- Studios: Sunset Sound (Hollywood, California); Can-Am Recorders (Tarzana, California); Larrabee Sound Studios (North Hollywood, California).
- Genres: R&B; dance-pop; new jack swing
- Length: 61:59
- Label: MCA
- Producers: André Cymone; Jeff Lorber

Jody Watley chronology
Jody Watley (1987)	Larger Than Life (1989)	You Wanna Dance with Me? (1989)

Singles from Larger Than Life
- 1. "Real Love" Released: March 18, 1989; 2. "Friends" Released: April 15, 1989; 3. "Everything" Released: August 22, 1989; 4. "What'cha Gonna Do For Me" Released: 1989 (UK); 5. "Precious Love" Released: February 27, 1990

Professional ratings
Review scores
Source	Rating
AllMusic	4.5/5 stars
Robert Christgau	B−
Q	3/5 stars

Larger Than Life is the second studio album by American singer Jody Watley, released by MCA Records on March 27, 1989.

== Reception ==
"André Cymone remains as slickly up to the minute as ever," observed Q's Mark Cooper, "filling his enormous rhythm sound with hip-hop references… Occasionally Watley lets the pose slip and slips into a passively sensuous ballad like 'Everything', but mostly she keeps acting stroppy. Perhaps she's annoyed at the lack of any tune to match that first hit; more likely she thinks looking angry makes her sexy."

== Track listing ==
All tracks are written by André Cymone and Jody Watley, except where noted.

No.	Title	Writer(s)	Producer(s)	Length
1.	"Real Love"		André Cymone	4:23
2.	"Friends" (featuring Eric B. & Rakim)	Cymone; Watley; Eric Barrier; William Griffin	Cymone	4:30
3.	"Everything"	Gardner Cole; James Newton Howard	Cymone	4:15
4.	"What 'cha Gonna Do for Me"		Cymone	4:11
5.	"L.O.V.E.R."		Cymone	4:49
6.	"For Love's Sake"		Cymone	4:26
7.	"Lifestyle"		Cymone	4:14
8.	"Precious Love"		Cymone	4:45
9.	"Something New"	Cymone; Watley; Franne Golde	Cymone	4:20
10.	"Once You Leave"		Cymone	4:01
11.	"Come into My Life"		Cymone	4:31
12.	"Only You"		Cymone	3:53
13.	"Real Love" (Extended Version)		Louil Silas Jr.	7:40
Total length:				61:59

CD bonus track – Track 13. "Real Love" (Extended Version)

== Personnel ==
- Jody Watley – lead vocals, backing vocals
- André Cymone – all other instruments
- Todd Horriman – Fairlight programming
- Gardner Cole – keyboards (3)
- Jai Winding – acoustic piano (12)
- Dean Parks – acoustic guitar (3, 8, 12), electric guitar (3, 8, 12)
- John Robinson – drums (8, 12)
- Paulinho da Costa – percussion (3, 8, 9)
- Larry Williams – saxophone (3, 9)
- Eric B. – turntablism (2)
- Rakim – rap (2)
- Bernadette Anderson – spoken voice (4)
- Maria Gallagher – Spanish translation (8)

== Production ==
- André Cymone – producer, overdub recording
- Jeff Lorber – additional production (13)
- Bobby Brooks – engineer (1–12)
- Dan Marnien – engineer (1–12)
- Jeff Poe – engineer (1–12), assistant engineer (1–12)
- David Bianco – engineer (13)
- Lawrence Fried – assistant engineer (1–12)
- Dave "the Blade" Knight – assistant engineer (1–12)
- Andy Batwinas – assistant engineer (13)
- Brian Malouf – mixing (1–12)
- Louis Silas Jr. – remixing (13)
- Greg Royal – special edits (13)
- Steve Hall – mastering at Future Disc Systems (Hollywood, California)
- Ivy Skoff – production assistant
- Lynn Robb – art direction, design
- Jody Watley – cover art concept, wardrobe stylist
- Steven Meisel – photography
- Mac James – portrait oil painting, portrait photography
- Paul Cavaco – wardrobe stylist
- Oribe – hair stylist
- Francois Nars – make-up

== Tour ==
Following the success of her Billboard chart hit pop singles, "Real Love" and "Friends", Watley embarked on her first USA solo tour, the Larger than Life Tour to support the platinum selling album.

Setlist

1. "What 'Cha Gonna Do for Me"
2. "Don't You Want Me"
3. "Still a Thrill"
4. "L.O.V.E.R."
5. "For Love's Sake"
6. "Most of All"
7. "Everything"
8. "Precious Love"
9. "Some Kind of Lover"
10. "Friends"
11. "Looking for a New Love"
12. "Real Love"

Shows

Date	City	Venue
June 2, 1989	Portland, OR	Arlene Schnitzer Concert Hall
June 3, 1989	Seattle, WA	Paramount Theatre
June 9, 1989	Oakland, CA	Paramount Theatre
June 10, 1989	Los Angeles, CA	Wiltern Theater
June 11, 1989	San Diego, CA	Copley Symphony Hall
June 24, 1989	Sunrise, FL	Sunrise Music Theatre
June 25, 1989	Tampa, FL	Tampa Bay Performing Arts Center
June 26, 1989	Orlando, FL	Bob Carr Performing Arts Centre
June 30, 1989	Charlotte, NC	Ovens Auditorium
July 1, 1989	Atlanta, GA	Fox Theatre
July 3, 1989	Richmond, VA	Mosque Theatre
July 5, 1989	Baltimore, MD	Lyric Theatre
July 6, 1989	Washington, DC	Constitution Hall
July 7, 1989	Manhattan, NYC	Apollo Theatre
July 8, 1989	Philadelphia, PA	Tower Theatre
July 10–11, 1989	Manhattan, NYC	Beacon Theatre
July 12, 1989	New Haven, CT	Palace Theatre
July 14, 1989	Boston, MA	Wang Theatre
July 15, 1989	Montreal, QC, Canada	La Ronde
July 16, 1989	Toronto Canada	Roy Thomson Hall
July 18, 1989	Cleveland, Ohio	Palace Theatre
July 19, 1989	Detroit, MI	Fox Theatre
July 20, 1989	Columbus, OH	Ohio Theatre
July 21, 1989	Chicago, IL	Riviera Theatre
July 23, 1989	Minneapolis, MN	Orpheum Theatre
July 24, 1989	Milwaukee, WI	Riverside Theatre
July 25, 1989	St. Louis, MO	Kiel Opera House
July 27, 1989	Denver, CO	Paramount Theatre
July 29, 1989	Salt Lake City, UT	Capitol Theatre
July 31, 1989	Sacramento, CA	Community Theatre
August 2, 1989	Irvine, CA	Bren Center
August 3–4, 1989	Los Angeles, CA	Universal Amphitheatre

== Charts ==
=== Weekly charts ===
Chart (1989)	Peak position
South African Albums (RISA)	9
Canada Top Albums/CDs (RPM)	22
Dutch Albums (Album Top 100)	59
German Albums (Offizielle Top 100)	63
Swedish Albums (Sverigetopplistan)	31
UK Albums (OCC)	39
US Billboard 200	16
US Top R&B/Hip-Hop Albums (Billboard)	5

=== Year-end charts ===
Chart (1989)	Position
Canada Top Albums/CDs (RPM)	91
US Billboard Pop Albums	51
US Top R&B/Hip-Hop Albums (Billboard)	22

=== Singles ===
Year	Single	Chart	Position
1989	"Real Love"	Dance/Club Play Songs (Billboard)	1
1989	"Real Love"	Hot Dance Music/Maxi-Singles Sales (Billboard)	2
1989	"Real Love"	Hot R&B/Hip-Hop Songs (Billboard)	1
1989	"Real Love"	Billboard Hot 100	2
1989	"Friends"	Dance/Club Play Songs (Billboard)	7
1989	"Friends"	Hot Dance Music/Maxi-Singles Sales (Billboard)	1
1989	"Friends"	Hot R&B/Hip-Hop Songs (Billboard)	3
1989	"Friends"	Billboard Hot 100	9
1989	"Everything"	Hot Adult Contemporary (Billboard)	11
1989	"Everything"	Hot R&B/Hip-Hop Songs (Billboard)	3
1989	"Everything"	Billboard Hot 100	4
1990	"Precious Love"	Hot R&B/Hip-Hop Songs (Billboard)	51
1990	"Precious Love"	Billboard Hot 100	87

== Certifications ==
Region	Certification	Certified units/sales
Canada (Music Canada)	Gold	50,000^{^}
United States (RIAA)	Gold	500,000^{^}
^{^} Shipments figures based on certification alone.
