= MTV Video Music Award for Best Female Video =

Annual music video award

- Awarded for: Female music videos
- Country: United States
- Presented by: MTV
- First award: 1984
- Final award: 2016
- Currently held by: "Hold Up" – Beyoncé (2016)

Highlights
- Most awards: Madonna, Taylor Swift & Beyoncé (3)
- Most nominations: Madonna (12)
- Website: VMA website

The MTV Video Music Award for Best Female Video is one of the original general awards that has been handed out every year since the first annual MTV Video Music Awards in 1984.

In 2007, however, the award was briefly renamed Female Artist of the Year, and it awarded the artist's whole body of work for that year rather than a specific video. In 2008, though, the award returned to its original name and was once again awarded for a specific video.

The category would become defunct beginning with the 2017 ceremony after the gender specific categories would be merged into the Artist of the Year category.

Madonna, Taylor Swift and Beyoncé are the biggest winners with three wins each, while the former also holds the record for most nominations with 12. Meanwhile, Beyoncé, Kelly Clarkson and Lady Gaga are the only artists to win the award for two consecutive years.

== Recipients ==
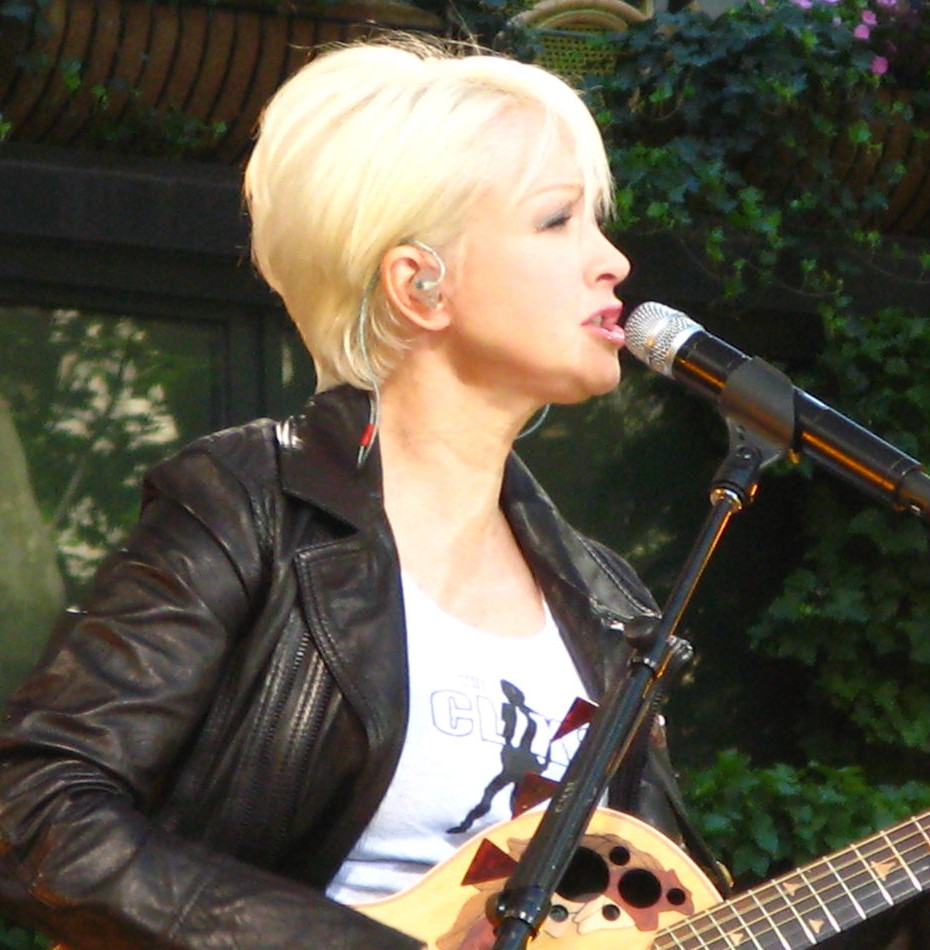
Inaugural winner Cyndi Lauper pictured in 2008.

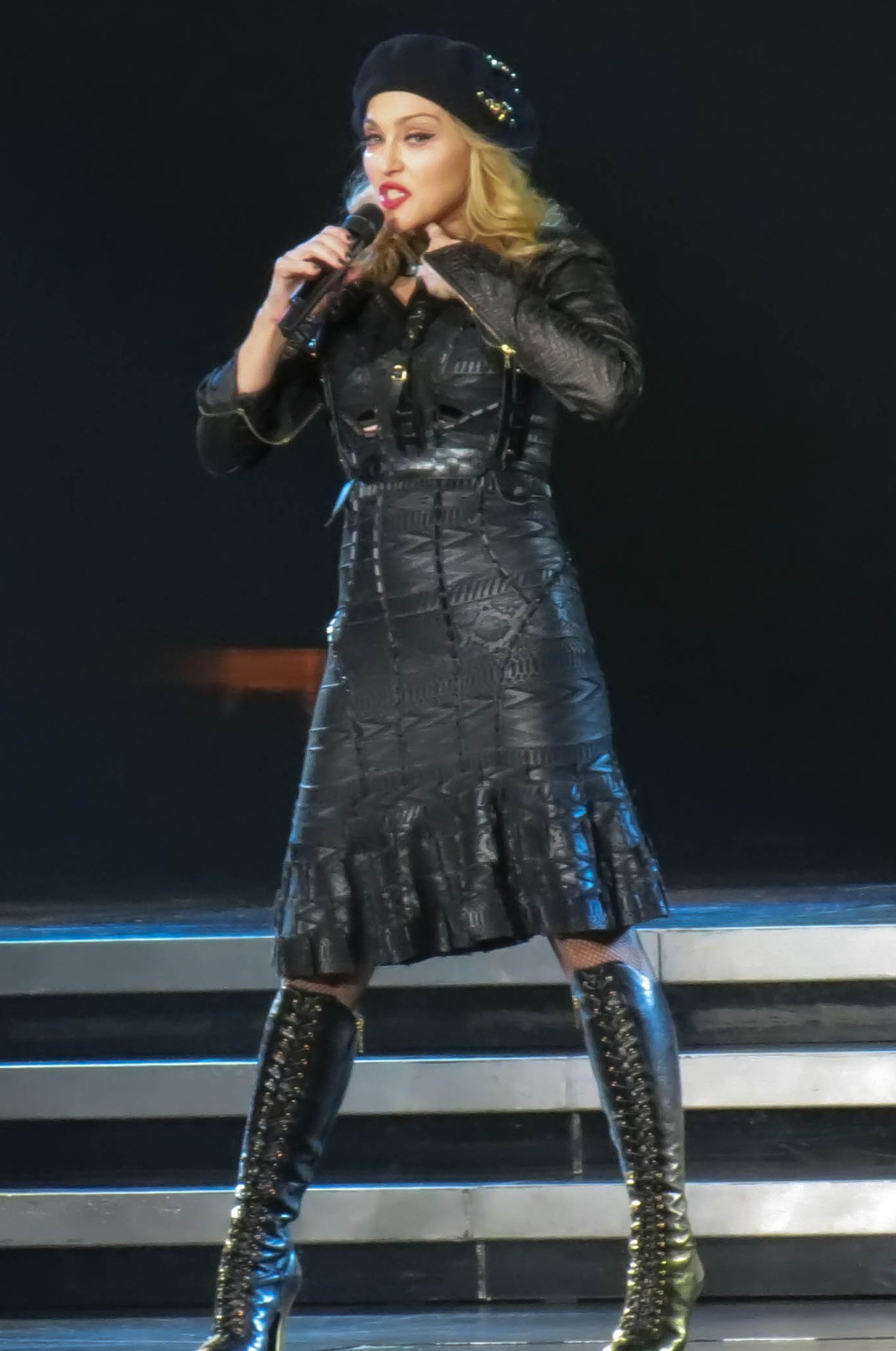
Madonna is the most nominated artist and won the award three times: 1987, 1995 and 1998.

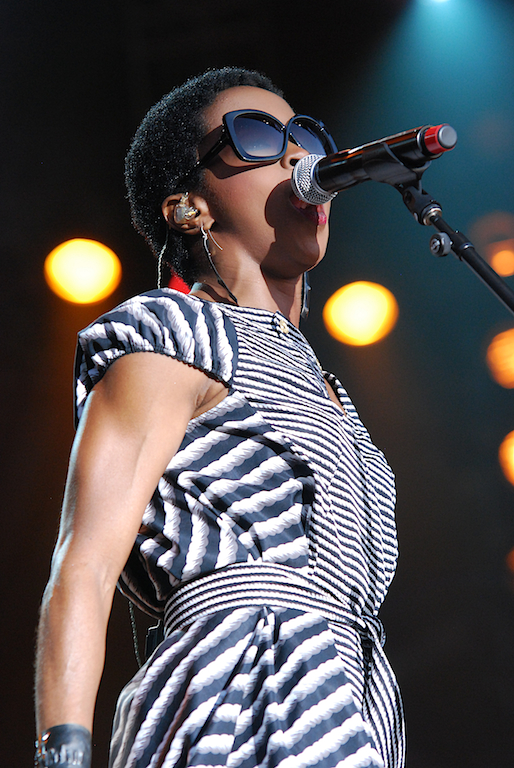
In 1999, Lauryn Hill became the first rapper to win the award

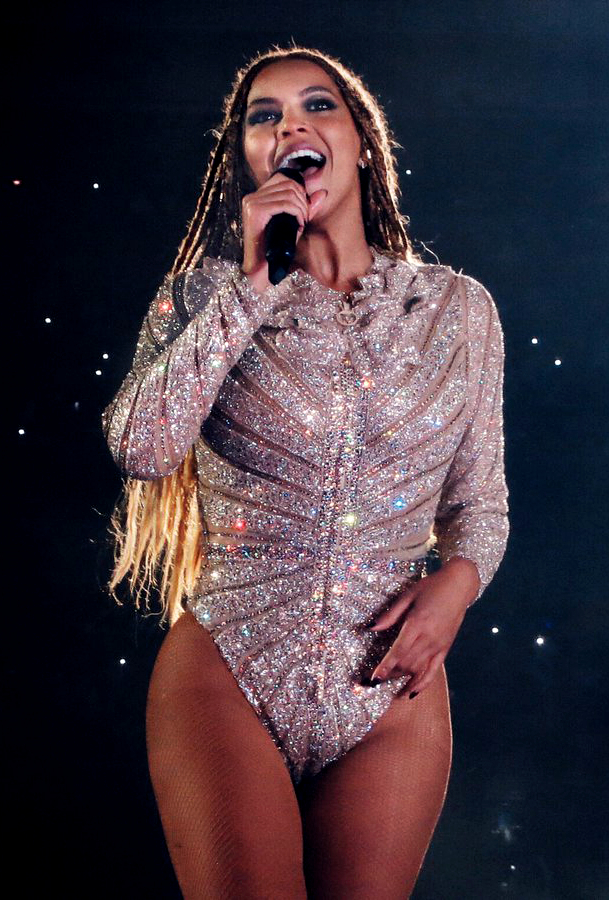
Beyoncé won the award for two consecutive years, has won the award three times and is the second most nominated with ten

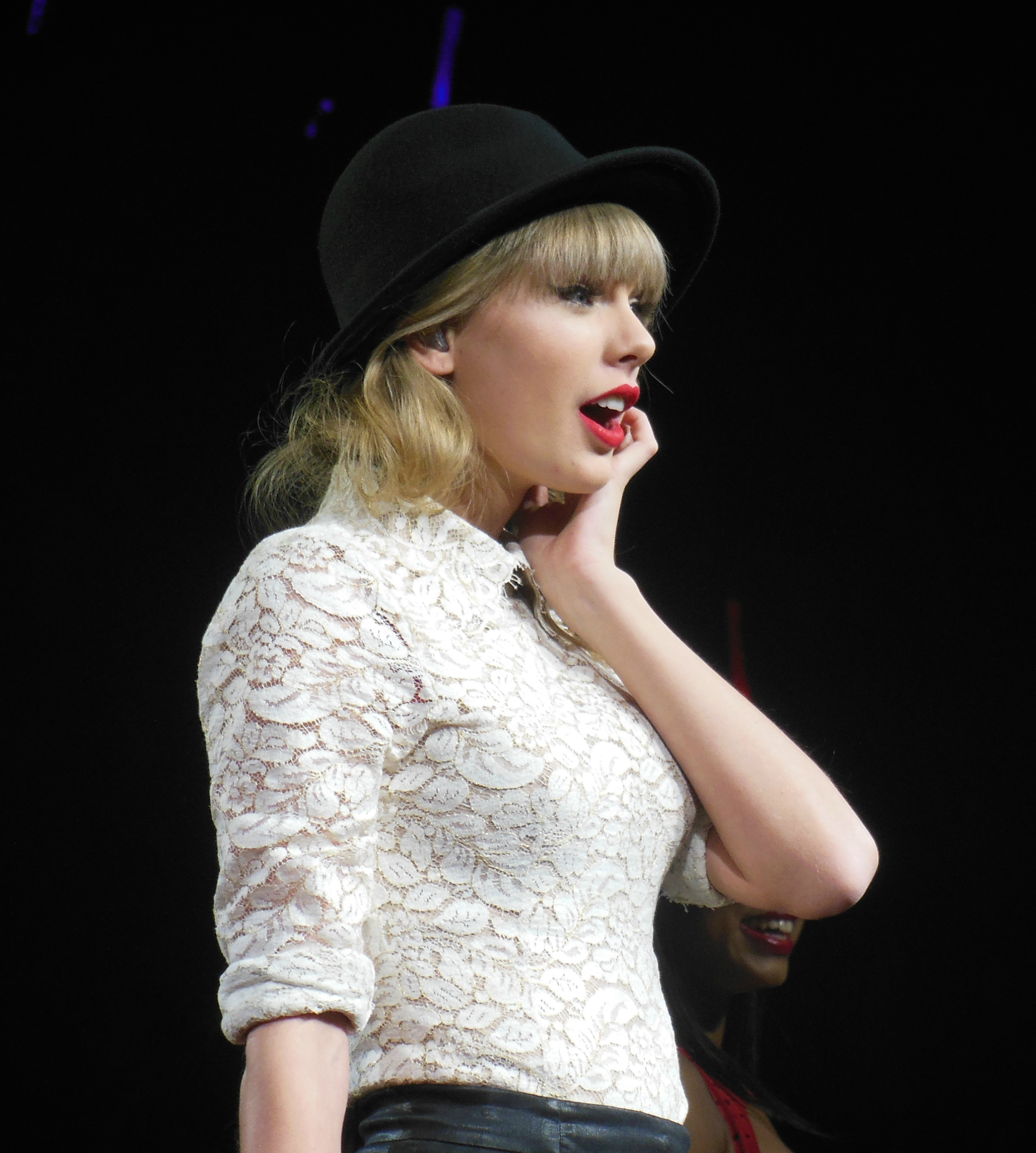
The 2009, 2013 and 2015 winner Taylor Swift for her music videos "You Belong with Me", "I Knew You Were Trouble" and "Blank Space". She is tied with Madonna and Beyoncé for the most wins in this category

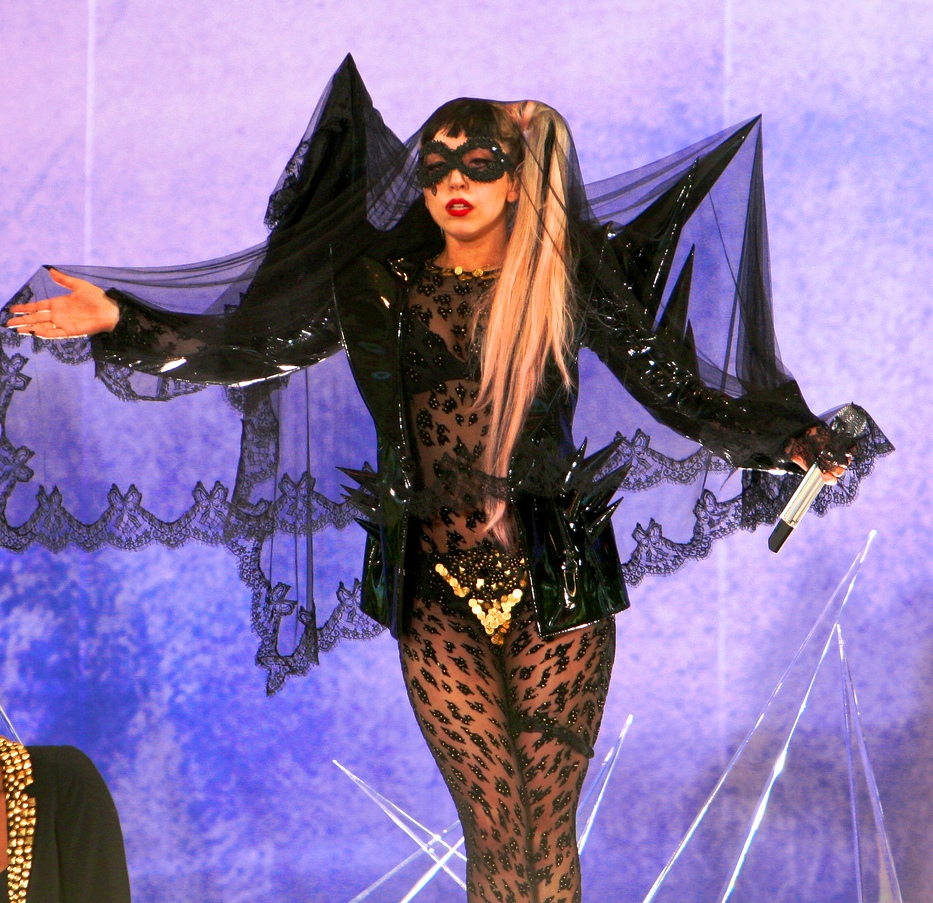
The 2010 and 2011 winner Lady Gaga for her music videos "Bad Romance" and "Born This Way." She is the third artist to win the award for two consecutive years

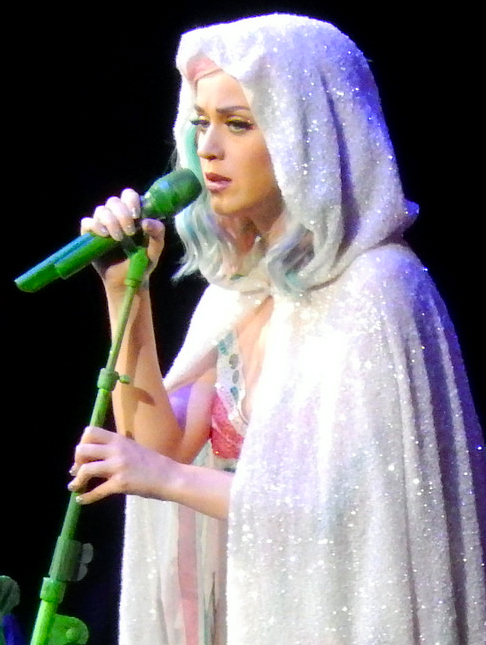
Katy Perry has won the award in 2014 for "Dark Horse". She is the third most nominated artist in this category, tied with Janet Jackson

Key
†	Marks winners of the MTV Video Music Award for Video of the Year
*	Marks nominees of the MTV Video Music Award for Video of the Year

=== 1980s ===
Recipients
Year (Note: Each year is linked to the article about the MTV Video Music Awards held that year.)	Winner(s)	Video	Nominees	Ref.
1984	Cyndi Lauper *	"Girls Just Want to Have Fun" *	Pat Benatar – "Love Is a Battlefield"; Cyndi Lauper – "Time After Time"; Bette Midler – "Beast of Burden"; Donna Summer – "She Works Hard for the Money"	
1985	Tina Turner	"What's Love Got to Do with It"	Cyndi Lauper – "She Bop"; Madonna – "Material Girl"; Sade – "Smooth Operator"; Sheila E. – "The Glamorous Life"	
1986	Whitney Houston	"How Will I Know"	Kate Bush – "Running Up That Hill"; Aretha Franklin – "Freeway of Love"; Grace Jones – "Slave to the Rhythm"; Tina Turner – "We Don't Need Another Hero"	
1987	Madonna	"Papa Don't Preach"	Kate Bush – "The Big Sky"; Janet Jackson – "Nasty"; Cyndi Lauper – "True Colors"; Madonna – "Open Your Heart"	
1988	Suzanne Vega	"Luka"	Cher – "I Found Someone"; Lita Ford – "Kiss Me Deadly"; Janet Jackson – "The Pleasure Principle"; Jody Watley – "Some Kind of Lover"	
1989	Paula Abdul	"Straight Up"	Tracy Chapman – "Fast Car"; Madonna – "Express Yourself"; Tanita Tikaram – "Twist in My Sobriety"; Jody Watley – "Real Love"	

=== 1990s ===
Recipients
Year (Note: Each year is linked to the article about the MTV Video Music Awards held that year.)	Winner(s)	Video	Nominees	Ref.
1990	Sinéad O'Connor †	"Nothing Compares 2 U" †	Paula Abdul – "Opposites Attract"; Madonna * – "Vogue" *; Alannah Myles – "Black Velvet"; Michelle Shocked – "On the Greener Side"	
1991	Janet Jackson	"Love Will Never Do (Without You)"	Paula Abdul – "Rush Rush"; Neneh Cherry – "I've Got You Under My Skin"; Amy Grant – "Baby Baby"; Madonna – "Like a Virgin (Truth or Dare version)"	
1992	Annie Lennox	"Why"	Tori Amos – "Silent All These Years"; Madonna – "Holiday (Truth or Dare version)"; Vanessa Williams – "Save the Best for Last"	
1993	k.d. lang	"Constant Craving"	Neneh Cherry – "Buddy X"; Janet Jackson – "That's the Way Love Goes"; Annie Lennox – "Walking on Broken Glass"	
1994	Janet Jackson	"If"	Björk – "Human Behaviour"; Sheryl Crow – "Leaving Las Vegas"; Me'Shell NdegéOcello – "If That's Your Boyfriend (He Wasn't Last Night)"	
1995	Madonna	"Take a Bow"	Des'ree – "You Gotta Be"; PJ Harvey – "Down by the Water"; Annie Lennox – "No More I Love You's"	
1996	Alanis Morissette *	"Ironic" *	Björk – "It's Oh So Quiet"; Tracy Chapman – "Give Me One Reason"; Jewel – "Who Will Save Your Soul"	
1997	Jewel *	"You Were Meant for Me" *	Erykah Badu – "On & On"; Toni Braxton – "Un-Break My Heart"; Meredith Brooks – "Bitch"; Paula Cole – "Where Have All the Cowboys Gone?"	
1998	Madonna †	"Ray of Light" †	Fiona Apple – "Criminal"; Mariah Carey (featuring Puff Daddy and the Family) – "Honey (Remix)"; Natalie Imbruglia – "Torn"; Shania Twain – "You're Still the One"	
1999	Lauryn Hill †	"Doo Wop (That Thing)" †	Jennifer Lopez – "If You Had My Love"; Madonna – "Beautiful Stranger"; Britney Spears – "Baby One More Time"	

=== 2000s ===
Recipients
Year (Note: Each year is linked to the article about the MTV Video Music Awards held that year.)	Winner(s)	Video	Nominees	Ref.
2000	Aaliyah	"Try Again"	Christina Aguilera – "What a Girl Wants"; Toni Braxton – "He Wasn't Man Enough"; Macy Gray – "I Try"; Britney Spears – "Oops!...I Did It Again"	
2001	Eve (feat. Gwen Stefani)	"Let Me Blow Ya Mind"	Dido – "Thank You"; Missy Elliott * – "Get Ur Freak On" *; Janet Jackson * – "All for You" *; Jennifer Lopez – "Love Don't Cost a Thing"; Madonna – "Don't Tell Me"	
2002	P!nk	"Get the Party Started"	Ashanti – "Foolish"; Michelle Branch – "All You Wanted"; Shakira – "Whenever, Wherever"; Britney Spears – "I'm a Slave 4 U"	
2003	Beyoncé (feat. Jay-Z)	"Crazy in Love"	Christina Aguilera (featuring Redman) – "Dirrty"; Missy Elliott † – "Work It" †; Avril Lavigne – "I'm with You"; Jennifer Lopez – "I'm Glad"	
2004	Beyoncé	"Naughty Girl"	Christina Aguilera – "The Voice Within"; Alicia Keys – "If I Ain't Got You"; Jessica Simpson – "With You"; Britney Spears * – "Toxic" *	
2005	Kelly Clarkson	"Since U Been Gone"	Amerie – "1 Thing"; Mariah Carey – "We Belong Together"; Shakira (featuring Alejandro Sanz) – "La Tortura"; Gwen Stefani * – "Hollaback Girl" *	
2006	Kelly Clarkson	"Because of You"	Christina Aguilera * – "Ain't No Other Man" *; Nelly Furtado (featuring Timbaland) – "Promiscuous"; Madonna * – "Hung Up" *; Shakira (featuring Wyclef Jean) * – "Hips Don't Lie" *	
2007	Fergie	—N/a	Beyoncé *; Nelly Furtado; Rihanna †; Amy Winehouse *	
2008	Britney Spears †	"Piece of Me" †	Mariah Carey – "Touch My Body"; Katy Perry – "I Kissed a Girl"; Rihanna – "Take a Bow"; Jordin Sparks (featuring Chris Brown) – "No Air"	
2009	Taylor Swift	"You Belong with Me"	Beyoncé † – "Single Ladies (Put a Ring on It)" †; Kelly Clarkson – "My Life Would Suck Without You"; Lady Gaga * – "Poker Face" *; Katy Perry – "Hot n Cold"; P!nk – "So What"	

=== 2010s ===
Recipients
Year (Note: Each year is linked to the article about the MTV Video Music Awards held that year.)	Winner(s)	Video	Nominees	Ref.
2010	Lady Gaga †	"Bad Romance" †	Beyoncé (featuring Lady Gaga) – "Video Phone (Extended Remix)"; Ke$ha – "Tik Tok"; Katy Perry (featuring Snoop Dogg) – "California Gurls"; Taylor Swift – "Fifteen"	
2011	Lady Gaga	"Born This Way"	Adele * – "Rolling in the Deep" *; Beyoncé – "Run the World (Girls)"; Nicki Minaj – "Super Bass"; Katy Perry † – "Firework" †	
2012	Nicki Minaj	"Starships"	Beyoncé – "Love on Top"; Selena Gomez & the Scene – "Love You Like a Love Song"; Katy Perry – "Part of Me"; Rihanna (featuring Calvin Harris) † – "We Found Love" †	
2013	Taylor Swift *	"I Knew You Were Trouble" *	Miley Cyrus – "We Can't Stop"; Demi Lovato – "Heart Attack"; P!nk (featuring Nate Ruess) – "Just Give Me a Reason"; Rihanna (featuring Mikky Ekko) – "Stay"	
2014	Katy Perry (feat. Juicy J)	"Dark Horse"	Iggy Azalea (featuring Charli XCX) * – "Fancy" *; Beyoncé – "Partition"; Ariana Grande (featuring Iggy Azalea) – "Problem"; Lorde – "Royals"	
2015	Taylor Swift	"Blank Space"	Beyoncé * – "7/11" *; Ellie Goulding – "Love Me like You Do"; Nicki Minaj – "Anaconda"; Sia – "Elastic Heart"	
2016	Beyoncé	"Hold Up"	Adele * – "Hello" *; Ariana Grande – "Into You"; Rihanna (featuring Drake) – "Work"; Sia – "Cheap Thrills"	

== Statistics ==
=== Artists with multiple wins ===
3 wins

- Beyoncé
- Madonna
- Taylor Swift

2 wins

- Kelly Clarkson
- Janet Jackson
- Lady Gaga

=== Artists with multiple nominations ===
12 nominations

- Madonna

10 nominations

- Beyoncé

6 nominations

- Janet Jackson
- Katy Perry

5 nominations

- Rihanna
- Britney Spears

4 nominations

- Christina Aguilera
- Cyndi Lauper
- Taylor Swift

3 nominations

- Paula Abdul
- Mariah Carey
- Kelly Clarkson
- Annie Lennox
- Jennifer Lopez
- Nicki Minaj
- P!nk
- Lady Gaga
- Shakira

== See also ==
- List of music awards honoring women
- MTV Europe Music Award for Best Female
