= Off the Hook (Jody Watley song) =

Single by Jody Watley

from the album Flower
- Released: February 23, 1998
- Genre: R&B, house
- Label: Atlantic
- Songwriter(s): Charles Pendleton, Cassandra Lucas, Darryl Floyd, D Reed
- Producer(s): Malik Pendleton

Jody Watley singles chronology
"This Is for the Lover in You" (1996)	"Off the Hook" (1998)	"If I'm Not in Love" (1998)

"Off the Hook" is a song by American singer Jody Watley, released in February 1998 by Atlantic as the first single from the singer's sixth album, Flower (1998). The song was written by Charles Pendleton, Cassandra Lucas, Darryl Floyd and D Reed, and produced by Malik Pendleton. It was the first single released by Watley to reach the US Billboard Hot 100 since 1993, peaking at number 73. The song also reached the Billboard Hot R&B Singles chart, peaking at number 23 and became her fifth chart topper on the Billboard Hot Dance Club Play chart. In the UK, "Off the Hook" charted on the UK Singles Chart, reaching number 51. A remixed version featuring rapper Rakim was also released.

== Critical reception ==
A reviewer from Music Week remarked that the song "sees her shaking off the dance rhythms of "Real Love" for a more downtempo R&B groove", and added that it "finds the one-time Grammy winner at her most seductive with an intimately sensual vocal performance which is the highlight of this rather ordinary track." The magazine's Alan Jones from Music Week felt that Watley is back "in impressive form" with "a sinewy R&B groove which allows her plenty of room and opportunity to demonstrate that her vocals have improved significantly over the years. A grinding and seductive groove surprisingly featuring a yowling rock guitar at regular intervals."

== Charts ==
=== Weekly charts ===
Chart (1998)	Peak position
New Zealand (RIANZ)	44
UK Singles (OCC)	51
UK R&B (OCC)	13
US Billboard Hot 100	73
US Hot R&B Singles (Billboard)	23
US Hot Dance Club Play (Billboard)	1

=== Year-end charts ===
Chart (1998)	Position
US Hot R&B Singles (Billboard)	71
