= Jody Watley (album) =

Studio album by Jody Watley
- Released: February 23, 1987
- Studios: Mama Jo's (North Hollywood, CA); Cherokee (Los Angeles, CA); Baby 'O (Los Angeles, CA); Music Grinder (Los Angeles, CA); Electric Lady (New York, NY); Sarm West (London, England); Gigot's Ears (Studio City, CA)
- Genres: Pop; R&B
- Length: 46:24
- Label: MCA
- Producers: André Cymone; David Z.; Bernard Edwards; Patrick Leonard

Jody Watley chronology
Jody Watley (1987)	Larger Than Life (1989)

Singles from Jody Watley
- 1. "Looking for a New Love" Released: January 6, 1987; 2. "Still a Thrill" Released: April 27, 1987; 3. "Don't You Want Me" Released: August 10, 1987; 4. "Some Kind of Lover" Released: January 4, 1988; 5. "Most of All" Released: April 18, 1988

Professional ratings
Review scores
Source	Rating
AllMusic	4.5/5 stars
Robert Christgau	C+
Rolling Stone	(positive)

Jody Watley is the debut studio album by American singer Jody Watley, released on February 23, 1987, by MCA Records. Although Watley had already found success as a part of the trio Shalamar, the impact of this album made her a cultural style icon in contemporary R&B, pop and dance music. Its success culminated in Watley winning a Grammy Award for Best New Artist in 1988 against fellow artists Breakfast Club, Cutting Crew, Terence Trent D'Arby and Swing Out Sister. The album also produced three top-ten singles on the US Billboard Hot 100: "Looking for a New Love" (No. 2), "Don't You Want Me" (No. 6) and "Some Kind of Lover" (No. 10). The album has sold two million copies in the United States and over four million copies worldwide.

== Track listing ==
All tracks are written by André Cymone and Jody Watley, except where noted.

Side one
No.	Title	Length
1.	"Looking for a New Love"	5:06
2.	"Still a Thrill"	4:48
3.	"Some Kind of Lover"	4:08
4.	"For the Girls"	3:51

Side two
No.	Title	Writer(s)	Length
1.	"Love Injection"	David Paul Bryant; Paul Gurvitz	3:45
2.	"Don't You Want Me"	Franne Golde; Bryant; Watley	4:10
3.	"Do It to the Beat"		4:45
4.	"Most of All"	Gardner Cole; Patrick Leonard	4:28
5.	"Learn to Say No" (Duet with George Michael)	Richard "Dimples" Fields; Michael	3:35
Total length:			46:24

CD/cassette bonus track
No.	Title	Length
10.	"Looking for a New Love (Extended Club Version)"	7:28

== Personnel ==
Musicians

- Jody Watley – lead vocals, background vocals
- André Cymone – "the band" (1–4, 7, 8, 10)
- Larry Schneider – saxophone (2, 3)
- Bernard Edwards – bass guitar (5, 6, 9)
- Tony Thompson – drums (5, 6, 9)
- Jeff Bova – Kurzweil K250 keyboards (5, 6, 9)
- Eddie Martinez – guitars (5, 6, 9)
- Terence Elliot – guitars (5, 6, 9)
- John "LBJ" Staehely – guitars (5, 6, 9)
- Roy Galloway – backing vocals (5, 6, 9)
- Fonzi Thornton – backing vocals (5, 6, 9)
- Patrick Leonard – Yamaha synthesizers (8), drum programming (8)
- Bruce Gaitsch – guitars (8)
- Gardner Cole – background vocals (8)
- Tampa Lann – background vocals (8)
- George Michael – duet vocals (9)

Technical

- André Cymone – producer (1–4, 7, 8, 10), mixing (9)
- David Z. – producer (1–4, 7, 8, 10), mixing (9)
- Erik Zobler – engineer (1–4, 7, 8, 10)
- Coke Johnson – mixing (1–4, 7, 8, 10)
- Louis Silas, Jr. – remixing (1–4, 7, 8, 10)
- Taavi Mõte – remix engineer (1–4, 7, 8, 10)
- Bernard Edwards – producer (5, 6, 9)
- Josh Abbey – engineer (5, 6, 9)
- Scott Church – assistant engineer (5, 6, 9)
- Daren Chadwick – second engineer (5, 6, 9)
- Glenn Kurtz – second engineer (5, 6, 9)
- Jon Ingoldsby – second engineer (5, 6, 9)
- Bridget Daly – second engineer (5, 6, 9)
- Chris Porter – second engineer (5, 6, 9)
- Patrick Leonard – producer (8)
- Csaba Petocz – engineer (8)
- Michael Verdick – engineer (8)
- Michael V. Blum – mixing assistant (8)
- Lynn Robb – art direction, design
- Victoria Pearson – photography
- Jody Watley – album cover concept

== Awards and nominations ==
- 1987 - American Music Award Nomination for R&B/Soul Single of the Year ("Looking for a New Love")
- 1988 - Grammy Award for Best New Artist
- 1988 - Soul Train Award Nomination for Album of the Year
- 1988 - Soul Train Award Nomination for Single of the Year ("Looking for a New Love")
- 1988 - Soul Train Award Nomination for Best Music Video ("Looking for a New Love")
- 1988 - MTV Video Music Award Nomination for Female Video of the Year ("Some Kind of Lover")
- 1988 - MTV Video Music Award Nomination for Best New Artist Video of the Year ("Some Kind of Lover")
- 1988 - Billboard Music Award for Top Dance / Club Play Artist of the Year

== Charts ==
=== Weekly charts ===
Chart (1987)	Peak position
Australian Albums (Kent Music Report)	94
South African Albums (RISA)	7
Canada Top Albums/CDs	17
New Zealand Albums (RMNZ)	23
UK Albums (OCC)	62
US Billboard 200	10
US Top R&B/Hip-Hop Albums (Billboard)	1

=== Year-end charts ===
Chart (1987)	Position
Canada Top Albums/CDs (RPM)	64
US Billboard 200	41
US Top R&B/Hip-Hop Albums (Billboard)	10

Chart (1988)	Position
US Billboard 200	35
US Top R&B/Hip-Hop Albums (Billboard)	21

=== Singles ===
Year	Single	Chart	Position
1987	"Looking for a New Love"	Dance Club Songs (Billboard)	1
1987	"Looking for a New Love"	Dance/Electronic Singles Sales (Billboard)	1
1987	"Looking for a New Love"	Hot R&B/Hip-Hop Songs (Billboard)	1
1987	"Looking for a New Love"	Billboard Hot 100	2
1987	"Still a Thrill"	Dance Club Songs (Billboard)	8
1987	"Still a Thrill"	Dance/Electronic Singles Sales (Billboard)	14
1987	"Still a Thrill"	Hot R&B/Hip-Hop Songs (Billboard)	3
1987	"Still a Thrill"	Billboard Hot 100	56
1987	"Don't You Want Me"	Dance Club Songs (Billboard)	3
1987	"Don't You Want Me"	Dance/Electronic Singles Sales (Billboard)	3
1987	"Don't You Want Me"	Hot R&B/Hip-Hop Songs (Billboard)	3
1987	"Don't You Want Me"	Billboard Hot 100	6
1987	"Some Kind of Lover"	Hot R&B/Hip-Hop Songs (Billboard)	3
1988	"Some Kind of Lover"	Dance Club Songs (Billboard)	1
1988	"Some Kind of Lover"	Dance/Electronic Singles Sales (Billboard)	1
1988	"Some Kind of Lover"	Billboard Hot 100	10
1988	"Most of All"	Dance Club Songs (Billboard)	8
1988	"Most of All"	Dance/Electronic Singles Sales (Billboard)	17
1988	"Most of All"	Hot R&B/Hip-Hop Songs (Billboard)	11
1988	"Most of All"	Billboard Hot 100	60

== Certifications ==
Region	Certification	Certified units/sales
Canada (Music Canada)	Gold	50,000^{^}
United States (RIAA)	Platinum	1,000,000^{^}
^{^} Shipments figures based on certification alone.

== See also ==
- List of number-one R&B albums of 1987 (U.S.)
