= Precious Love (Jody Watley song) =

Single by Jody Watley

from the album Larger Than Life
- Released: February 27, 1990
- Studio: Sunset Sound (Hollywood, CA); Can-Am Recorders (Tarzana, CA)
- Genre: Pop
- Length: 4:45
- Label: MCA
- Songwriters: André Cymone, Jody Watley
- Producer: André Cymone

Jody Watley singles chronology
"Everything" (1989)	"Precious Love" (1990)	"I Want You" (1991)

Music video
- "Precious Love" on YouTube

"Precious Love" is a song by American singer and songwriter Jody Watley, released in February 1990 by MCA Records, as the fourth and final single from her second album, Larger Than Life (1989). It is co-written by Watley with producer André Cymone. The song was the least successful of the four singles released from the album, peaking at numbers 54 and 87 on the US Cash Box Top 100 and Billboard Hot 100 charts.

== Charts ==
Chart (1990)	Peak position
South Africa (RISA)	73
UK Singles (OCC)	97
US Billboard Hot 100	87
US Hot Black Singles (Billboard)	51
US Cash Box Top 100	54
