= The Saturday Night Experience Volume 1 =

Studio album by Jody Watley
- Released: November 17, 1999; 2002 (North America)
- Recorded: 1999
- Genres: Electronica; dance; deep house; downtempo; R&B
- Length: 58:57 (Japan edition); 41:59 (Australia edition); 24:02 (North America edition)
- Label: Avitone
- Producers: Derrick Edmundson; Rodney Lee; Jody Watley; Lati Kronlund

Jody Watley chronology
Flower (1998)	The Saturday Night Experience Volume 1 (1999)	20th Century Masters: The Millennium Collection (2000)

Singles from Midnight Lounge
- 1. "Another Chapter" Released: 1999; 2. "Saturday Night Experience" Released: 2001

The Saturday Night Experience Volume 1 is the seventh studio album by American singer Jody Watley, released on November 17, 1999, issued under Avitone Records. Exclusively released as an import only in Japan and Australia, later available in 2002 as an EP in North America.

== Background ==
The Saturday Night Experience Volume 1 found Watley experimenting more freely with underground electronic styles like deep house, drum n bass, trip hop and downtempo. Originally intended as an EP (hence the subtitling: "with Jody Watley"), the recording's popularity with fans caused Watley to declare it a full-length album proper.

Watley's current new material also foreshadowed the fully club-friendly sounds that Watley would embrace on subsequent full-length releases. In 2002, a North America limited-edition version of The Saturday Night Experience, dubbed The Saturday Night Experience EP, was sold exclusively through Watley's own official website. Packaged in a paper sleeve, the limited pressing contained remixes of "Timeless" and "Pure Joy".

== Track listings ==
The Saturday Night Experience Volume 1 – Japanese, Australian edition
No.	Title	Writer(s)	Producer(s)	Length
1.	"Saturday Night Experience"	Jody Watley; Rodney Lee	Lee	4:50
2.	"Another Chapter"	Watley; Lati Kronlund; Joseph A. Jones	Kronlund	7:47
3.	"Timeless"	Watley; Lee	Lee	5:40
4.	"The Love" (The Angel Remix)	Watley; Lee	Angel C	6:21
5.	"Pure Joy"	Watley; Derrick Edmundson	Edmundson	5:26
6.	"After Hours"	Watley; Edmundson	Edmundson	3:46
7.	"The Lonely"	Watley; Edmundson	Edmundson	4:30
8.	"The Love"	Watley; Lee	Lee	4:55
9.	"Saturday Night Experience" (Reprise)	Watley; Lee	Lee	0:54
10.	"Another Chapter" (DJ Soma Grow Sound Mix)	Watley; Kronlund; Jones	Kronlund; Junichi Soma	5:36
11.	"Another Chapter" (S&T Ball Room Mix)	Watley; Kronlund; Jones	Kronlund; Soma; DJ Turbo	9:19
Total length:				59:04

The Saturday Night Experience Volume 1 – North American limited edition
No.	Title	Writer(s)	Producer(s)	Length
1.	"Saturday Night Experience"	Watley; Lee	Lee	4:50
2.	"Pure Joy"	Watley; Edmundson	Edmundson	5:32
3.	"Timeless" (Lifeline Mix)	Watley; Lee	Lee	5:48
4.	"After Hours"	Watley; Edmundson	Edmundson	3:46
5.	"Pure Joy" (Wamdue Remix)	Watley; Edmundson	Chris Brann; Edmundson	5:26
Total length:				24:02

== Personnel ==
- Jody Watley – vocals, background vocals
- Ethan Farmer – bass
- Kristoffer Wallman – keyboards, producer
- DJ Kaz – scratching
- Rodney Lee – composer
- Derrick B. Edmundson – guitar, keyboards, saxophone, soloist, flute
- Hitoshi Haruawa – keyboards

Production

- Producer – Lati Kronlund, Derrick B. Edmundson, Rodney Lee, Jody Watley
- Executive Producer – Bill Coleman
- Producer, Remixing – DJ Soma
- Producer, Remixing – DJ Turbo
- Remixing, Engineer, Producer, Programming – Angel C.
- Drum Programming, Engineer, Instrumentation, Mixing, Producer, Programming – Derrick B. Edmundson
- Mastering – Steve Hall
- Producer, Remixing – Hitoshi Harukawa
- Art Direction, Design – Allen Hori
- Mixing – Yoshihiro Kawasaki
- Drum Programming, Instrumentation, Producer, Programming – Rodney Lee
- Instrumentation, Mixing, Producer – Lati Kronlund
- Design – Ed Taylor
