= Flower (Jody Watley album) =

Studio album by Jody Watley
- Released: March 31, 1998
- Recorded: 1997–1998
- Genre: R&B, pop, dance
- Length: 52:42
- Label: Atlantic
- Producer: Derrick Edmondson, Phil Galdston, Masters at Work, Malik Pendleton, D'Wayne Wiggins, Bryce Wilson, Deric "D-Dot" Angelettie

Jody Watley chronology
Greatest Hits (1996)	Flower (1998)	The Saturday Night Experience Volume 1 (1999)

Professional ratings
Review scores
Source	Rating
Allmusic	3/5 stars
Entertainment Weekly	B

Flower is the sixth album by American pop singer Jody Watley, released in 1998 and her first for Atlantic Records.

== Track listing ==
Flower track listing
No.	Title	Writer(s)	Producer(s)	Length
1.	"Lovin' You So"	Rahsaan Patterson; Dwayne Wiggins; Chaka Khan; Tony Maiden	Dwayne Wiggins	3:37
2.	"Flower"	Jody Watley; Wiggins; Michelle Hailey	Wiggins	4:02
3.	"Off the Hook"	Cassandra Lucas; Charles Pendleton; Darryl Floyd	Malik Pendleton	4:02
4.	"Everything You Do"	Watley; Derrick Edmondson	Edmondson; Watley	5:13
5.	"Just One More Time"	Adrianne Johnson Ross; Dennis Ross III	Phil Galdston	4:49
6.	"If I'm Not in Love"	Dawn Thomas	Galdston	3:45
7.	"A Lifetime"	James Heath; Patterson	Jamey Jaz	4:02
8.	"No More Tears to Cry"	Bradley Spalter; Robbie Nevil; Sheppard Solomon	Bryce Wilson	4:00
9.	"You'll Never Find a Love"	Harvey Fuqua; Londee Wiggins; Paul Antoine; Stephanie Cooke	Paul Antoine; Edmondson; Watley	4:16
10.	"I Don't Want You Back"	Watley; Herman Berry; Steve Feldschneider	Masters at Work	4:00
11.	"Baby Tonight"	Watley; Edmondson; Claude M'Barali; Philippe Cerboneschi	Edmondson; Watley	3:54
12.	"16"	Watley; Wiggins	Wiggins	2:57
13.	"Off the Hook (D-Dot Remix)" (featuring Rakim)	Lucas; Pendleton; Floyd; David Reeves	Deric Angelettie; Blake Smith	4:03
Total length:				52:42

== Personnel ==
- Jody Watley – vocals, background vocals
- Marlon Williams – guitar
- Neil Steubenhaus, Gene Perez – bass
- John Scarpulla – tenor saxophone
- Peter Daou – keyboards
- Derrick Edmondson, Jamey Jaz – keyboards, drum programming
- John Robinson, Cornelius Mims – drums
- Bryce Wilson – keyboards, drum programming
- Michael Thompson, Arthur White – guitar
- Greg Phillinganes – piano
- John Wheeler – trombone
- Phil Galdston – keyboards
- Rakim – rap vocals on "Off the Hook" (D-Dot Remix)
- Tony Kadleck – trumpet
- Patrick Morgan – viola
- Darryl Brown – bass guitar
- Vidal Davis – drums
- Ken Lewis – guitar
- Audrey Wheeler, Naimeh Heath, Cindy Mizelle, Lua Crofts, Paulette McWilliams, Dwayne Wiggins, Cassandra Lucas, Latina Webb, Stephani Alexander – backing vocals

Production

- Producer – Derrick Edmondson, Phil Galdston, Masters at Work, Malik Pendleton, D' Wayne Wiggins, Bryce Wilson
- Executive producers – Rich Christina, Darren Higman, Craig Kallman, Jody Watley
- Arranger – Phil Galdston

== Charts ==
=== Singles ===
Year	Single	Chart	Position
1998	"Off the Hook"	Hot Dance Music/Club Play	1
1998	"Off the Hook"	Hot Dance Music/Maxi-Singles Sales	8
1998	"Off the Hook"	Hot R&B/Hip-Hop Singles & Tracks	23
1998	"Off the Hook"	Billboard Hot 100	73
1998	"If I'm Not In Love"	Hot Dance Music/Club Play	1
