= Midnight Lounge =

Studio album by Jody Watley
- Released: April 24, 2001 (Japan); March 11, 2003 (United States)
- Recorded: 2000–2001
- Studio: I.B.S. Studios (Los Angeles, CA)
- Genre: Electronica; dance; R&B; downtempo; deep house; soul
- Length: 61:35
- Label: Avitone; Shanachie
- Producer: Kenny "Dope" Gonzalez; King Britt; Rodney Lee; Ron Trent; Little Louie Vega; Jody Watley; Dave Warrin

Jody Watley chronology
20th Century Masters: The Millennium Collection (2000)	Midnight Lounge (2001)	The Makeover (2006)

Singles from Midnight Lounge
- 1. "Saturday Night Experience" Released: March 6, 2001; 2. "Photographs" Released: January 2, 2001; 3. "Whenever" Released: July 29, 2003; 4. "The Essence" Released: 2004

Professional ratings
Review scores
Source	Rating
Allmusic	3.5/5 stars
Slant Magazine	3.5/5 stars
Vibe	2/5 stars

Midnight Lounge is the eighth studio album by American singer Jody Watley. Originally released only in Japan on her Avitone label (in conjunction with Universal Music Group), critical acclaim prompted Watley to release the album Stateside by way of a distribution deal with Avitone and Shanachie. The U.S. release also included productions from King Britt and Eastwest Connection.

== Track listings ==
All songs written by Rodney Lee and Jody Watley, except where noted.

Midnight Lounge – Japanese edition
No.	Title	Writer(s)	Producer(s)	Length
1.	"Midnight Lounge"		Rodney Lee; Jody Watley	4:03
2.	"Whenever.."		Lee; Watley	5:43
3.	"Photographs"		Lee; Watley	4:57
4.	"I Love to Love"	Davis; Payne; Watley; Tyler	Kenny Gonzalez; Louie Vega	3:38
5.	"Skin Deep"		Lee; Watley	3:34
6.	"More"		Lee; Watley	4:50
7.	"Saturday Night Experience" (Ron Trent Remix)		Ron Trent	8:26
8.	"Clouds"		Lee; Watley	3:59
9.	"Don't Give Up"	Peter Gabriel	Dave Warrin	5:15
10.	"Midnight Lounge" (Reprise)			1:40
11.	"Photographs" (Dave Warrin Remix)		John Warrin; Dave Warrin	6:18
Total length:				61:35

Midnight Lounge – North America edition
No.	Title	Writer(s)	Producer(s)	Length
1.	"Midnight Lounge"		Lee; Watley	4:03
2.	"Whenever..."		Lee; Watley	5:43
3.	"Photographs"		Lee; Watley	4:57
4.	"I Love to Love"	Davis; Payne; Watley; Tyler	Gonzalez; Vega	3:38
5.	"SKin Deep"		Lee; Watley	3:34
6.	"More"		Lee; Watley	4:50
7.	"Saturday Night Experience" (Ron Trent Remix)		Trent	8:26
8.	"Clouds"		Lee; Watley	3:59
9.	"Don't Give Up"	Gabriel	Warrin	5:15
10.	"The Essence"	King Britt; Watley	Britt	4:46
11.	"Midnight Lounge" (Reprise)			1:40
12.	"Whenever" (Afro Kozmic Soul Remix)		Kimani Wilson	5:24
13.	"Photographs" (East West Connection Remix)		Dr. Bob Jones; Lofty; Neil Cowley	4:20
Total length:				60:44

== Personnel ==
- Jody Watley – vocals, backing vocals
- Roy Ayers – vibraphone
- Michael Ciro – guitar
- Dave Karasony – drums
- Rodney Lee – multiple instruments
- Mornington Lockett – saxophone
- Barney McAll – keyboard
- Josh Milan – keyboard, hammond organ
- John Scarpulla – saxophone
- Martin Shaw – trumpet
- Chris Standring – guitar
- Dave Warrin – musician
- John Warrin – guitar
- John Wheeler – trombone

Production

- Producers – Kenny "Dope" Gonzalez, King Britt, Rodney Lee, Ron Trent, Little Louie Vega, Dave Warrin, Jody Watley
- Executive producers – Bill Coleman, Kenny "Dope" Gonzalez, Little Louie Vega
- Engineer – Dave Darlington
- Mixing – Steven Barkan, Jay-J, Ron Trent
- Remixing – Dave Warrin
- Mastering – Steve Hall
- Editing – Albert Cabrera
- Programming – Rodney Lee
- Vocal arrangement – Jody Watley
- Drum programming – Ron Trent
- Instrumentation – Rodney Lee
- Arrangers – Ron Trent, Dave Warrin
- Art direction – Allen Hori, Jody Watley
- Photography – Michael Walls

== Charts ==
=== Weekly charts ===
Chart (2003)	Peak position
US Top Electronic Albums (Billboard)	13
US Top Independent Albums (Billboard)	49

=== Singles ===
Year	Single	Chart	Position
2003	"Whenever" (Remixes)	Hot Dance Music/Club Play (Billboard)	19
