= Everything (Jody Watley song) =

1989 single by Jody Watley

Single by Jody Watley

from the album Larger Than Life
- Released: August 22, 1989
- Length: 4:15
- Label: MCA
- Songwriters: Gardner Cole, James Newton Howard
- Producer: André Cymone

Jody Watley singles chronology
| "Friends" (1989) | "Everything" (1989) | "Precious Love" (1990) |

Music video
- "Everything" on YouTube

"Everything" is the third single from American singer-songwriter Jody Watley's second album, Larger Than Life (1989). "Everything" was the third consecutive top-10 single from that album in the United States, peaking at number four on the Billboard Hot 100 and number three on the Billboard Hot Black Singles chart. The single also reached number 11 in Canada and number 74 in the United Kingdom.

== History ==
"Everything" was the follow-up single to "Friends" and became the third consecutive top-10 hit from Larger Than Life. "Everything" debuted on the US Billboard Hot 100 chart at number 92 on the week of October 14, 1989, and advanced to its peak position of number four the week of January 20, 1990, where it remained for two weeks. Overall, the single spent 10 weeks in the top 20 of the chart.

== Charts ==
=== Weekly charts ===
| Chart (1989–1990) | Peak position |
|---|---|
| Canada Top Singles (RPM) | 11 |
| Canada Adult Contemporary (RPM) | 23 |
| UK Singles (Official Charts) | 74 |
| US Billboard Hot 100 | 4 |
| US Adult Contemporary (Billboard) | 11 |
| US Hot Black Singles (Billboard) | 3 |

=== Year-end charts ===
| Chart (1990) | Position |
|---|---|
| US Billboard Hot 100 | 41 |
| US Adult Contemporary (Billboard) | 45 |
