= Friends (Jody Watley song) =

Single by Jody Watley featuring Eric B. & Rakim

from the album Larger Than Life
- B-side: "Private Life"
- Released: April 15, 1989
- Studio: Sunset Sound (Hollywood, CA); Can-Am Recorders (Tarzana, CA)
- Genre: New jack swing; hip-hop; club
- Length: 4:30 (album version); 4:15 (single version)
- Label: MCA
- Songwriters: André Cymone; Jody Watley; Eric Barrier; William Griffin
- Producer: André Cymone

Jody Watley featuring Eric B. & Rakim singles chronology
"Real Love" (1989)	"Friends" (1989)	"Everything" (1989)

Music video
- "Friends" on YouTube

"Friends" is the second single from Jody Watley's second album, Larger Than Life.

== History ==
"Friends", like her previous single "Real Love", became a multi-format top-10 smash, reaching the top ten of the pop, R&B and dance charts in the U.S., as well as being her biggest single in the UK since her debut, "Looking for a New Love". The song was one of the first ever to feature a rap artist (Eric B. & Rakim) and a singer.

"Friends" appeared in the Top 10, peaking at number nine for one week on the Billboard Hot 100. It peaked at number three on the Hot Black Singles chart and number seven on the Hot Dance Club Play chart.

In 2006, Watley remade the song for her release of The Makeover, on her Avitone Records label, uniquely titled "Friendz," featuring rapper Voshaun Gotti.

In 2024, during an appearance on the daytime talk show Sherri, Watley discussed the production of the song. She revealed that her label at the time, MCA Records, originally pushed for the duo DJ Jazzy Jeff & the Fresh Prince to be featured on the track instead of Eric B. & Rakim. Watley refused the label's suggestion, doubling down on Eric B. & Rakim as her first and only choice, noting that their style was better suited for the song's lyrical themes of betrayal.

== Charts ==
=== Weekly charts ===
Chart (1989)	Peak position
Australian Singles Chart	146
Canadian Singles Chart (RPM))	11
Canadian Singles Chart (The Record)	24
Dutch Singles Chart	25
German Singles Chart	45
Irish Singles Chart	25
Italy Airplay (Music & Media)	6
New Zealand Singles Chart	31
South Africa (RISA)	8
Swiss Singles Chart	20
UK Singles Chart	21
U.S. Billboard Hot 100	9
U.S. Billboard Hot Black Singles	3
U.S. Billboard Hot Dance Club Play	7
US Dance Tracks (Dance Music Report)	1

=== Year-end charts ===
Chart (1989)	Position
U.S. Billboard Hot Black Singles	65

== Track listings ==
=== US 7" single ===
No.	Title	Producer(s)	Length
1.	"Friends" (7" version)	André Cymone	4:13
2.	"Private Life"	André Cymone	4:40
Total length:			8:53

=== US 12" vinyl ===
No.	Title	Producer(s)	Length
1.	"Friends" (7" version)	André Cymone	4:13
2.	"Private Life"	André Cymone	4:40
3.	"Friends" (12" extended version)	Hank Shocklee, Eric Sadler, Paul Shabazz	8:05
Total length:			16:58

=== US 12" maxi-single ===
No.	Title	Producer(s)	Length
1.	"Friends" (Extended Version)	Hank Shocklee, Eric Sadler, Paul Shabazz	8:05
2.	"Friends" (Radio edit)	André Cymone	5:10
3.	"Friends" (Instrumental)	André Cymone	5:31
4.	"Friends" (Dub)	André Cymone	4:32
5.	"Friends" (Acappella)	André Cymone	3:20
Total length:			26:38

=== Digital download (2015 CJ Mackintosh Remixes) ===
No.	Title	Producer(s)	Length
1.	"Friends" ("Unity" remix)	André Cymone; CJ Mackintosh	8:05
2.	"Friends" (Bassapella)	André Cymone; CJ Mackintosh	5:53
Total length:			13:58
