= Gardner Cole =

American songwriter

Gardner Cole (born Gardner Kain Christopher Cole) is an American songwriter, keyboard player and music producer. He is best known as songwriter of 1980s and early 1990s songs for Cher, Michael McDonald, Tina Turner, Jody Watley, and Madonna. He also recorded two solo albums on Warner Bros. Records. His 1988 single "Live It Up" reached #91 in the US in October.

== Discography ==
- Δ's (Triangles) (1988)
- It's Your Life (1991)

== Songs ==
- "Open Your Heart", originally "Follow Your Heart", written for singer Cyndi Lauper by Cole and Peter Rafelson, although it was never played to her.
- "Everything" 1989 Gardner Cole, James Newton Howard
- "Say Once More" Amy Grant, Gardner Cole

== As producer ==
- "Another Lover" song by Giant Steps

== As keyboard player ==
- Larger than Life 1989 album by Jody Watley.

== Record label ==
Cole founded Desert Sky Records as an independent label.
