= Still a Thrill =

Single by Jody Watley

from the album Jody Watley
- Released: April 27, 1987
- Studio: Mama Jo's Studios (North Hollywood, CA)
- Genre: Pop; soul; funk
- Length: 4:41
- Label: MCA
- Songwriters: Jody Watley; André Cymone
- Producers: André Cymone; David Z.

Jody Watley singles chronology
"Looking for a New Love" (1987)	"Still a Thrill" (1987)	"Don't You Want Me" (1987)

Music video
- "Still A Thrill" on YouTube

"Still a Thrill" is the second single from singer Jody Watley's self-titled debut album. It was released on April 27, 1987 through MCA Records.

== History ==
While the #56 (US) peaking "Still a Thrill" didn't necessarily match the pop chart success of its blockbuster predecessor, "Looking for a New Love", it was a major hit on both the R&B and dance charts in 1987. Watley employed a deep lower register on this uptempo R&B / dance song, which she co-wrote. It was produced by Andre Cymone and David Z.

== Covers ==
Indie Neo-soulsters, Soulscream, covered "Still a Thrill" on their 2001 album, Prototype @lpha1 2001 Neophunk. Synth-pop artist, Matthew Duffy, covered "Still a Thrill" on his album, Here I Come.

== Legacy ==
- T-Boz of TLC cited this song as an example setting her vocal tone for her singing career. In a personal video, she sent to Watley (and was given permission to share on her YouTube channel) T-Boz thanked Watley for this song during her teenage years citing she was "hitting them notes" and helping her sing at a lower register to better suit her vocal range.

== Track listings ==
Non-UK 7-inch and cassette single

1. "Still A Thrill" - 4:12
2. "Looking For A New Love (A Cappella)" - 5:06

US 12-inch single

A1. "Still A Thrill" (Extended Version) – 8:39
B1. "Still A Thrill" (Radio Edit) – 6:15
B2. "Still A Thrill" (Instrumental) – 5:16
B3. "Still A Thrill" (A Cappella) – 4:41
B4. "Still A Thrill" (Bonus Beats) – 4:34

== Charts ==
=== Weekly charts ===
Chart (1987)	Peak position
New Zealand (Recorded Music NZ)	46
South Africa (RISA)	40
UK Singles (OCC)	77
US Billboard Hot 100	56
US Hot Black Singles (Billboard)	3
US Dance Club Songs (Billboard)	8
US Cash Box Top 100	66

=== Year-end charts ===
Chart (1987)	Position
US Hot Black Singles (Billboard)	48
