= Most of All =

Single by Jody Watley

from the album Jody Watley
- Released: April 18, 1988
- Recorded: 1986
- Studio: Gigot's Ears (Studio City, CA)
- Genre: Pop
- Length: 4:28
- Label: MCA
- Songwriters: Gardner Cole; Patrick Leonard
- Producer: Patrick Leonard

Jody Watley singles chronology
| "Some Kind of Lover" (1988) | "Most of All" (1988) | "Real Love" (1989) |

Music video
- "Most of All" on YouTube

"Most of All" is a song by American singer Jody Watley from her 1987 eponymous debut studio album. It was released on April 18, 1988, as the fifth and final single from the Jody Watley album.

== Background ==
"Most of All" was the least successful of the five singles released from the Jody Watley album. It peaked at number 60 on the US Billboard Hot 100 but did find success on the Dance Club Songs and Hot R&B/Hip-Hop Songs charts, where it reached numbers 8 and 11, respectively. The song was produced by Patrick Leonard and was co-written by Gardner Cole, both of whom had been involved with Madonna's 1986 album, True Blue.

The accompanying black and white music video for "Most of All" was directed by David Fincher.

== Charts ==
=== Weekly charts ===
| Chart (1988) | Peak position |
|---|---|
| Netherlands (Dutch Top 40) | 90 |
| South Africa (RISA) | 19 |
| US Billboard Hot 100 | 60 |
| US Hot Dance Music-Club Play (Billboard) | 8 |
| US Hot Black Singles (Billboard) | 11 |
