= Some Kind of Lover =

Single by Jody Watley

from the album Jody Watley
- Released: January 4, 1988
- Studio: Mama Jo's Studios (North Hollywood, CA)
- Genre: Dance-pop
- Length: 4:09 (album version); 4:32 (dance remix)
- Label: MCA
- Songwriters: Jody Watley, André Cymone
- Producers: André Cymone, David Z.

Jody Watley singles chronology
"Don't You Want Me" (1987)	"Some Kind of Lover" (1988)	"Most of All" (1988)

Music video
- "Some Kind of Lover" on YouTube

"Some Kind of Lover" is the fourth single from Jody Watley's debut album Jody Watley.

== History ==
"Some Kind of Lover" was Jody's third top 10 pop single from the album, and third number-one on the US dance chart. Though the single found huge success in the U.S., the single only reached number 81 on the UK charts.

The single advanced into the top 40 of the U.S. Billboard Hot 100 singles chart during the week of February 27, 1988, reaching number 10 the week of April 16, 1988. "Some Kind of Lover" kept Watley in the Top 20 of the singles chart for six weeks.

The music video premiered in January 1988 and was nominated for two MTV Video Music Awards, for Best Female Video and Best New Artist in a Video, she also performed "Some Kind of Lover" at the award show that year.

== Awards and nominations ==
Year	Award
1988	MTV Video Music Award nomination for Best Female Video for "Some Kind of Lover"
1988	MTV Video Music Award nomination for Best New Artist for "Some Kind of Lover"

== Charts ==
Chart (1988)	Peak position
Canadian Singles Chart	47
South Africa (RISA)	25
UK Singles Chart	81
U.S. Billboard Hot 100	10
U.S. Billboard Hot Black Singles	3
U.S. Billboard Hot Dance Club Play	1

Year-end chart (1988)	Position
U.S. Billboard Hot Black Singles	57
U.S. Billboard Hot Dance Club Play	12
U.S. Billboard Hot Dance 12-Inch Singles	11
