= Jody Watley =

American singer (born 1959)

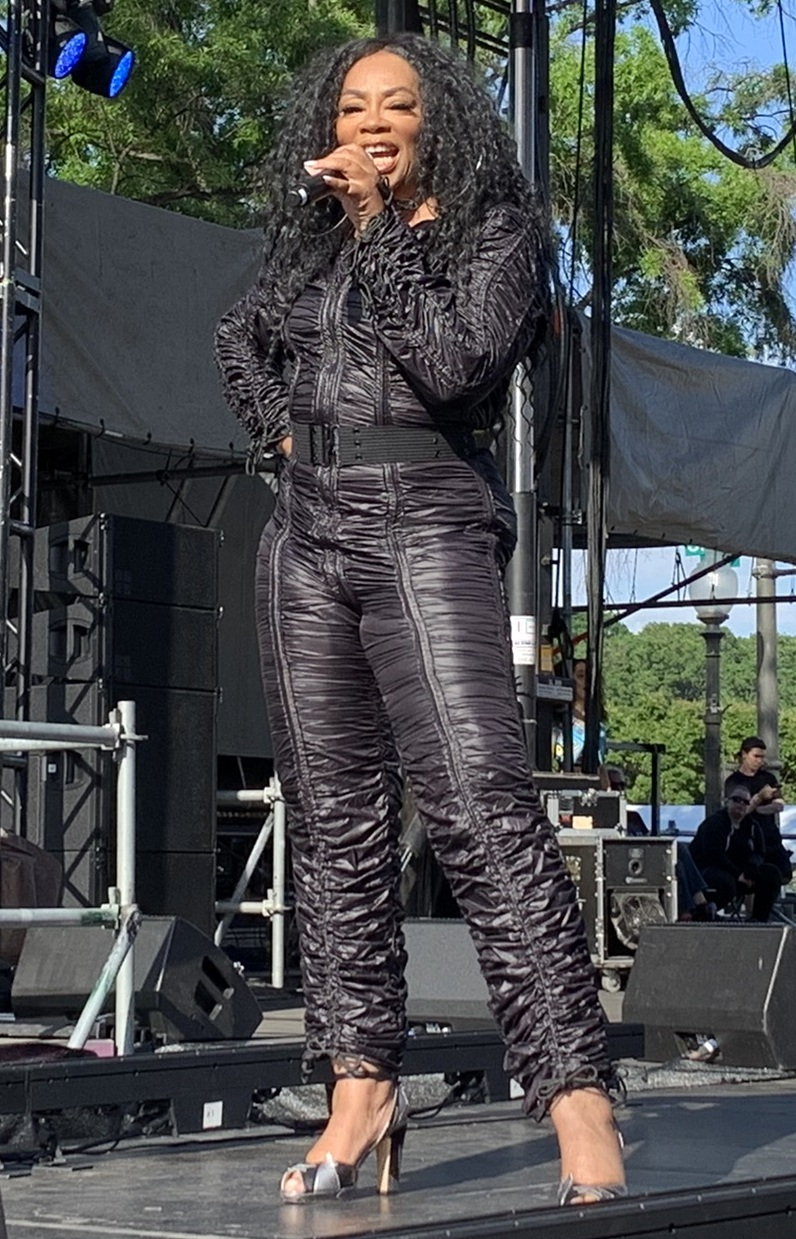
- Watley performing in 2022

Background information
- Born: Jody Vanessa Watley; January 30, 1959 (age 67); Chicago, Illinois, U.S.
- Origin: Los Angeles, California, U.S.
- Genres: Pop; R&B; electronic; soul; dance; jazz; house
- Occupations: Singer; songwriter; record producer; radio host
- Instruments: Vocals; piano; keyboards
- Years active: 1974–present
- Labels: SOLAR; MCA; Atlantic; Giant Step; Avitone
- Website: jodywatley.net

Jody Vanessa Watley (born January 30, 1959) is an American singer, songwriter, and music producer. Watley first found musical success in 1977 when she became a part of the original lineup of the R&B group Shalamar. The group recorded the hits "The Second Time Around", "A Night to Remember" and "I Can Make You Feel Good". After recording several albums with the group, Watley left the group in 1983.

Watley signed with MCA Records and the label released her self-titled debut album in 1987. The album launched three top ten singles on the Billboard Hot 100: Number 1 R&B Hit "Looking for a New Love", "Don't You Want Me", and "Some Kind of Lover". The success of the album helped Watley to win the Grammy Award for Best New Artist in 1988. Watley would eventually record four more top ten singles between 1989 and 1996 including Number 1 R&B Hit "Real Love" and "Friends" with rapper Rakim. "Friends" would arguably helped propel the formula of pop or R&B and rap collaborations along with Chaka Khan's "I Feel for You" which was a US top five Hot 100 hit several years prior in 1984. After the success of her sophomore album, Larger than Life, her commercial success peaked and subsequent releases such as Affairs of the Heart and Intimacy failed to make much of an impact on the Top 200 Album chart. Jody Watley, known as a style icon, has continued to evolve creatively and independently across genres of dance and electronica

Since 2023, Watley has hosted the Sirius XM Satellite Radio show, The Jody Watley Show, a monthly life, music and culture show featuring celebrity guests and classic R&B hits.

Her honors have included a Billboard Dance Lifetime Achievement Award and a Crossover Music Icon honor at the Black Music Honors. In 2018, she was ranked the 53rd most successful female charting artist on the Billboard Hot 100. In March 2021, Watley was named the First Ambassador of the National Museum of African American Music. In 2022, Watley received an honorary doctorate in business and Presidential Lifetime Achievement Award from Joe Biden at Jody Watley Day at Georgia State Capitol, and was inducted into Women Songwriters Hall of Fame.

== Biography ==
=== 1974–1984: Soul Train and Shalamar ===
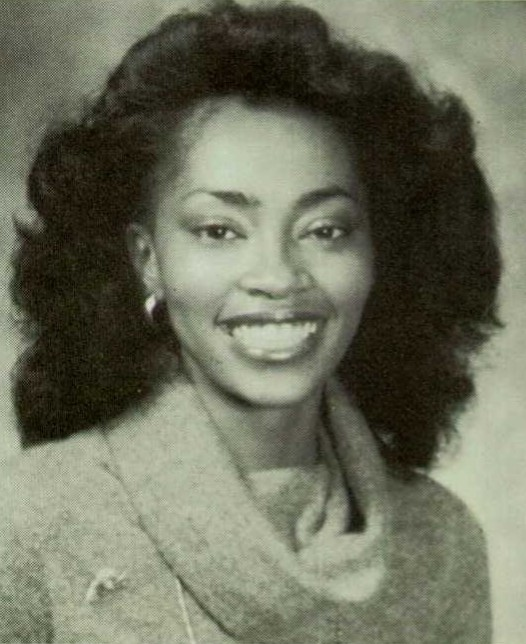
Jody Watley in 1977

Watley was born the second eldest of three to parents Rose Watley, a choir singer, and John Watley, a radio evangelist, in Chicago. According to Watley, her home entertained famous musicians such as Sam Cooke, Joe Tex and Jackie Wilson, the latter of whom becoming Watley's godfather. According to Watley, her father's itinerant ministry "kept [them] on the move". When Watley was eight, Jackie Wilson brought the unsuspecting girl onto the stage with him during a performance. Three years later, while living in Kansas City, Watley organized a dance trio called "Black Fuzz". Shortly after the Watleys moved to Los Angeles in 1974, she began attending Dorsey High School, where she subsequently graduated from in 1977.

During her first week in Los Angeles, while attending James Cleveland’s Cornerstone Institutional Baptist Church, a parishioner there, Glen Stafford, approached her with an offer to be his temporary dance partner on the popular urban dance TV show, Soul Train, to which the 15-year-old happily accepted. Watley wouldn't become a regular dancer on the program, however, until 1975. By then, she had become dance partners with Jeffrey Daniel and shortly thereafter became a popular attraction on the show.

Not too long afterwards, in 1976, Soul Train host and founder Don Cornelius and his then business partner Dick Griffey formed Soul Train Records and bought masters for a record called "Uptown Festival", a disco medley of Motown classics that was billed with the name "Shalamar". The song had been led by Gary Mumford and background session singers. To promote the record, Cornelius decided to replace the background singers with Watley and Daniel. "Uptown Festival" was released in April 1977 and became a hit. Soul Train Records soon folded and Griffey formed SOLAR Records in 1978, with Shalamar and the Whispers as his first acts. By then, Mumford had left the group and was replaced by former session vocalist and Soul Train dancer Gerald Brown, releasing their second album, Disco Gardens, which featured the R&B hit, "Take That to the Bank", which was Watley's first recorded co-lead in the group alongside Brown. Around that same year, Watley and Daniel were both featured in an October 1978 issue of Ebony as she was noted as part of "The New Generation" in an article called "The 'Outrageous' Waack Dancers" on the magazine.

Brown left the group in early 1979 right before the release of another Brown-led single from the album. He was soon replaced by singer Howard Hewett, therefore assembling the "classic" lineup of the group. Between 1979 and 1983, Watley, Daniel and Hewett recorded five albums together — Big Fun (1979), Three for Love (1980), Go for It (1981), Friends (1982) and The Look (1983). Watley co-led on some of the group's biggest hits, namely "Make That Move" and "A Night to Remember", while singing background on other hits such as "The Second Time Around", "This Is for the Lover in You" and "Dead Giveaway".

During this period, three of Shalamar's albums — Big Fun, Three for Love and Friends — and one single ("The Second Time Around") all received gold certifications from the Recording Industry Association of America. Despite the success, all three Shalamar bandmates had a contentious relationship with one another and with their SOLAR record label for lack of payment as well as artistic decisions that neither bandmate could agree to. By the completion of The Look, Watley requested to be let go from the group as she eventually wanted to embark on a solo career. Following a UK promotional tour, where the group filmed the music video for "Dead Giveaway" in London, Watley and Daniel left the group. Despite The Look not performing as well as Friends, "Dead Giveaway" won the Watley-Hewett-Daniel lineup of Shalamar a Grammy Award nomination for Best R&B Vocal Performance by a Duo or Group.

Watley relocated to London after leaving Shalamar. During this period, Watley recorded session work with Musical Youth on their album, Different Style!. She also recorded with Gary Langan, Anne Dudley and J. J. Jeczalik (who later became Art of Noise). In 1984, she recorded two singles for Phonogram Records under the mononym "Jody" — "Where the Boys Are" and "Girls Night Out", which was released only in Europe and Australia.

In December 1984, Watley was one of only a few American acts — including R&B group Kool and the Gang — to participate in Bob Geldof's Band Aid recording of "Do They Know It's Christmas?", which included Bono, Boy George, Sting, George Michael, Phil Collins, Status Quo, Paul Weller, Bananarama and other prominent Irish and British artists.

=== Solo career ===
==== 1987–1988: Jody Watley and commercial breakthrough ====
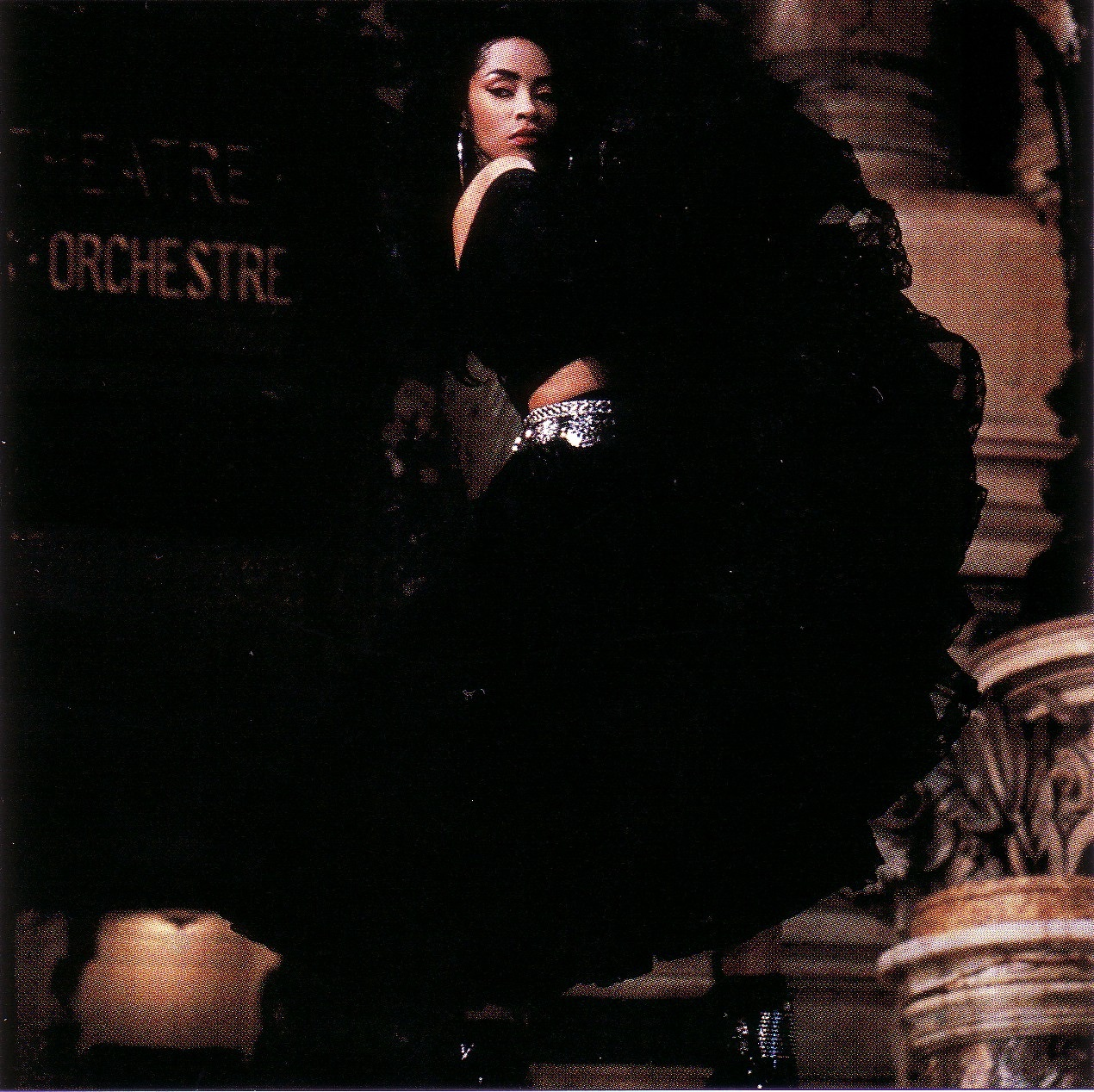
Watley in Paris shooting the music video for "Still a Thrill" in 1987.

In 1986, after more than two years in the UK, Watley returned to the United States where she signed with MCA Records. Working with former Prince collaborator André Cymone and Bernard Edwards of the group Chic, Watley released her self-titled solo debut, Jody Watley, in March 1987.

The album included six songs that were co-written by Watley. During her interview on the album with Rolling Stone, Watley stated she wanted to showcase her voice against "really funky hard dance tracks". The album would become a hit upon its release, reaching number 10 on the Billboard 200 and topped the Top Black Albums chart, later selling over four million copies worldwide and going platinum in the United States, remaining her best-selling album to date.

The album produced three top ten singles on the Billboard Hot 100, including "Looking for a New Love", which peaked at number 2 on the Billboard Hot 100 and was certified gold, "Don't You Want Me", which peaked at number 6 and "Some Kind of Lover", which reached number 10, along with minor hits "Still a Thrill" and "Most of All". The album is also notable for the George Michael-featured duet "Learn to Say No".

The album's success led to Watley being nominated for two solo Grammy Awards at the 30th Annual Grammy Awards in 1988, winning Best New Artist, which became a controversial win due to having released her first solo records in 1984 under the name "Jody". During that period, she had been featured in the UK pop magazine Smash Hits as "formerly of Shalamar".

This "technicality" (no second name) allowed her to be considered for Best New Artist. Watley's win was also negatively compared to the Grammy snubs of Whitney Houston and Richard Marx. It remains her only Grammy win as of 2026.

Following her Grammy win, Watley was featured in Harper's Bazaar magazine photographed by Francesco Scavullo. In addition to the Grammy nominations, she also received multiple nominations at the MTV Video Music Awards and the Soul Train Music Awards.

==== 1989–1992: Larger Than Life and Affairs of the Heart ====
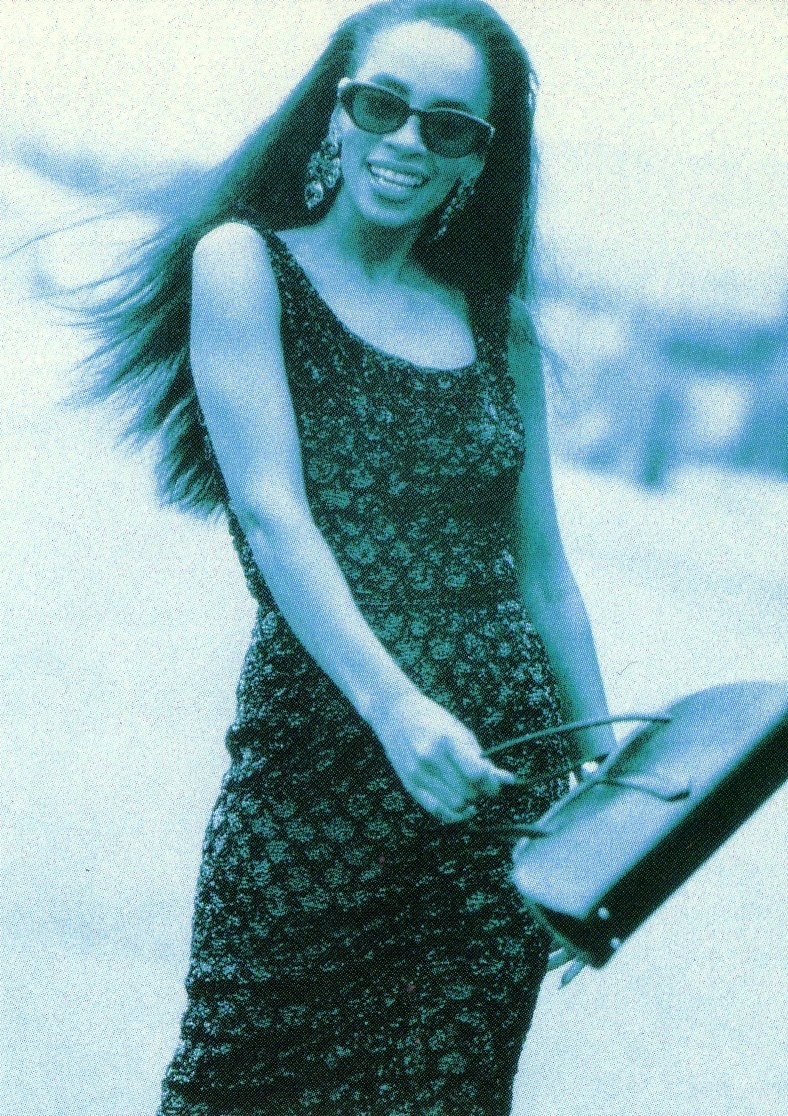
Watley pictured in 1990.

Watley's second album, Larger Than Life was released in the spring of 1989. Watley was even more hands-on with the album, co-penning eleven of the album's twelve songs with Cymone.

The album peaked at number 16 on the Billboard 200 and produced three top ten singles, including "Real Love", which repeated the success of "Looking for a New Love", by peaking at number 2 on the Billboard Hot 100, "Friends", which reached number 9 on the same chart, and her first hit ballad, "Everything", which peaked at number 4. A fourth single, "Precious Love", was a moderate hit, peaking at number 78.

"Friends" was notable for being the first pop hit single to include the formula of a pop star featuring a guest rapper with the custom full 16-bar verses and bridge concept.

Despite repeating the top ten singles success of her debut, Larger Than Life performed less stellar, only receiving a gold certification in the United States.

The "Real Love" music video was nominated for seven MTV Video Music Awards in 1989, which was at the time the most nominations for a video until Michael Jackson and Janet Jackson's music video for "Scream" was nominated for a record eleven trophies in 1995. In October 1989, Watley released her first remix album, You Wanna Dance with Me?, followed by the music video collection, Video Classics, which later attained gold status in the United States. Watley was also featured in Harper's Bazaar's "Ten Most Beautiful Women" issue, while also being featured on the cover of the Japanese fashion magazine, SPUR in its debut issue. She also became the first black woman to produce a fitness video, Dance to Fitness.

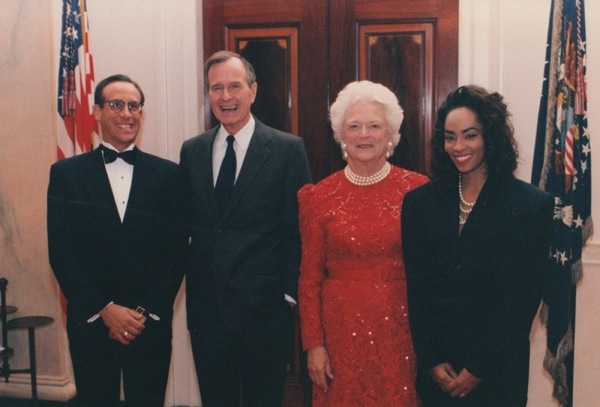
Watley photographed with President George H. W. Bush, First Lady Barbara Bush, 1992

After recording the song "It's All There" for the film, Switch, Watley's next album, Affairs of the Heart, was released in December 1991. During promotion of the album, Watley explained to interviewers that she wanted to change her musical range and image, showing she could do more than dance music. Watley told Alan Light that she was inspired toward a more introspective approach, wanting to address social topics. The album proved to be not as successful as Watley's previous two albums, only peaking at number 124 on the Billboard 200 and number 21 on the R&B Albums chart, her lowest showings at the time. Justin Kantor described the album as an "overlooked standout of her 1980s and 1990s output" in the book All Music Guide to Soul: The Definitive Guide to R&B and Soul. The album's leading single, "I Want You", peaked at number 61 on the Billboard Hot 100. The second single, "I'm the One You Need", reached number 19 on the Hot 100 and would be Watley's last top 40 solo entry. The follow-up, "It All Begins with You", failed to make the Hot 100 at all. Watley later performed the song while attending the White House for President George H. W. Bush in 1992; during her visit, Watley encouraged the United States government to provide more support and funding for public schools.

==== 1993–1999: Intimacy and subsequent releases ====
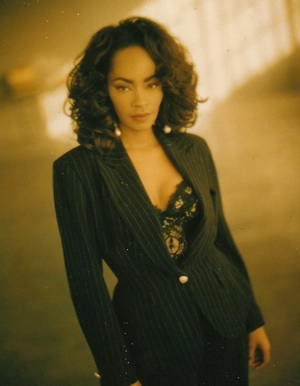
Promotional photo, 1993

In November 1993, Watley dropped her fourth solo album, Intimacy. Noting that new jack swing was the emerging popular subgenre of R&B at the time, Amy Linden wrote in People magazine that Intimacy continued the process of Watley's move toward more refreshingly adult themes and that Watley was deserving of serious attention. Watley herself said that the songs she wrote were always personal statements. Filled with songs of "romance and angst", Intimacy peaked at number 164 on the Billboard 200, with the first single, "Your Love Keeps Working on Me", barely scraping the Hot 100. The follow-up, "When a Man Loves a Woman" was notable for it being a mostly spoken word song and reached the top 20 of the Hot R&B Singles chart. The David Morales-produced "Ecstasy" became an underground hit for Watley.

Intimacy would be Watley's last release with MCA. She formed Avitone Records shortly afterwards and released her fifth album, Affection, in July 1995. The album was engineered and produced by Booker T. Jones and Angelo Earl. She aligned Avitone with the independent Bellmark Records for distribution. Jose Promis of AllMusic wrote in his review of the album that it lacked the urgency and immediacy of her dance-era hits, but was an engaging collection of slow burners, mid-tempo and jazzy R&B. The album's title track, "Affection", didn't crack the Hot 100 but became a moderate R&B hit, peaking at No. 28. The following year, Watley made Broadway history when she became the first black actress to play the role of Rizzo in the Broadway revival of Grease. That same year, she briefly reunited with her former Shalamar bandmates Howard Hewett and Jeffrey Daniel on Babyface's hip-hop soul rendition of Shalamar's 1981 hit, "This Is for the Lover in You", featured on Babyface's album, The Day, which featured new lyrics by Babyface and rap verses by LL Cool J. Credited to Watley, Hewett and Daniel, it would be Watley's seventh and last top ten single on the Billboard Hot 100 as of 2026.

At the end of 1996, Watley signed with Big Beat/Atlantic Records in an attempt at a mainstream comeback. Nearly two years later, in 1998, Watley released her sixth studio album, Flower. The first single, "Off the Hook" was moderately successful reaching number 73 on the Hot 100 and number 23 on the Hot R&B Singles chart, with a remixed version topping the Hot Dance Club Songs chart. "Off the Hook" has remained Watley's last single to chart on both the Billboard Hot 100 and Hot R&B singles chart. A second single, "If I'm Not in Love", was also successful on the dance chart, peaking at number two. Despite this, however, Watley faced trouble promoting the album. Just as Flower was set for release in the United States, Big Beat was absorbed into its parent label Atlantic Records, which in turn, shelved the album from being released in the United States, leading to two years of legal troubles for Watley. The album was still a critical success after its release in Canada, the UK and Japan. One of the songs on the album, "Lovin' You So", was featured on the soundtrack to the 1998 Eddie Murphy vehicle, Dr. Dolittle. Around this same time, a previously unreleased song featuring Watley with George Duke titled "Baby Love" was included as a bonus track on The Best of George Duke: The Electra Years in 1997.

Watley revived Avitone in 1999 to release her seventh studio album on Universal Japan, The Saturday Night Experience Volume 1, a collection of organic club music tracks, inspired by her newfound love of electronic music. Watley told music historian David Nathan that originally the album was intended to be a concept album, "aimed at people looking for something different", further stating she had no desire to release the project in the United States. The title song of the same name was licensed to Giant Step and included on their compilation "Giant Sessions, Volume 1 Mixed by Ron Trent".

==== 2005–2013: Independent releases ====
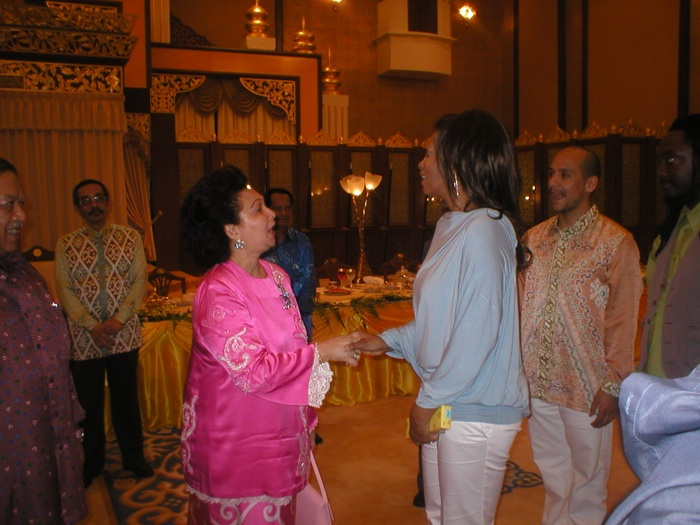
Watley meeting Tuanku Tengku Fauziah, Queen of Malaysia, 2005

In 2001, Watley released her eighth studio album, Midnight Lounge, in Europe and Japan. Watley was quoted in Billboard around its release, "an artist should always explore new frontiers". The album included songs that "combined a blend of soul, jazz, R&B and electronic club music". After securing a short license deal with Shanachie Records in the US, the album was released in Watley's home country in March 2003, becoming her first US release in eight years, peaking inside the top 20 of the Billboard Top Electronic Albums chart. Remixes of the song "Whenever" helped it reach number nineteen on the Billboard dance singles chart. Watley was helmed by critics for updating her sound over the years and "evolving into a soulful chanteuse". Watley would make Billboard chart history in 2005 when a re-release of "Looking for a New Love" reached number one on the dance charts in the US, making Watley the first to take the song to number one in two different decades. The same year, Watley was invited to participate in the Force of Nature Relief Concert to aid the victims of the 2004 Indian Ocean earthquake. During the trip Watley and others (including the Black Eyed Peas, Lauryn Hill and Jackie Chan) were invited to the Royal Palace to meet the King and Queen of Malaysia for a special tea reception in showing their gratitude for all involved with Force of Nature.

In 2006, Watley's ninth studio album, The Makeover, was released. Another electronica album, it brought Watley together with 4Hero and King Britt among others. Watley's label arranged for the album to be released exclusively to the Virgin Megastore chain in its first ever CD exclusive, noting the shifting paradigms and changing business models in the music industry. Due to Watley having a Virgin mini-tour, the album topped the week of new releases for the retailer. The first single, a cover of Madonna's "Borderline", peaked at number two on the Billboard Dance Club Songs chart while the second, a cover of Chic's "I Want Your Love", topped the same chart.

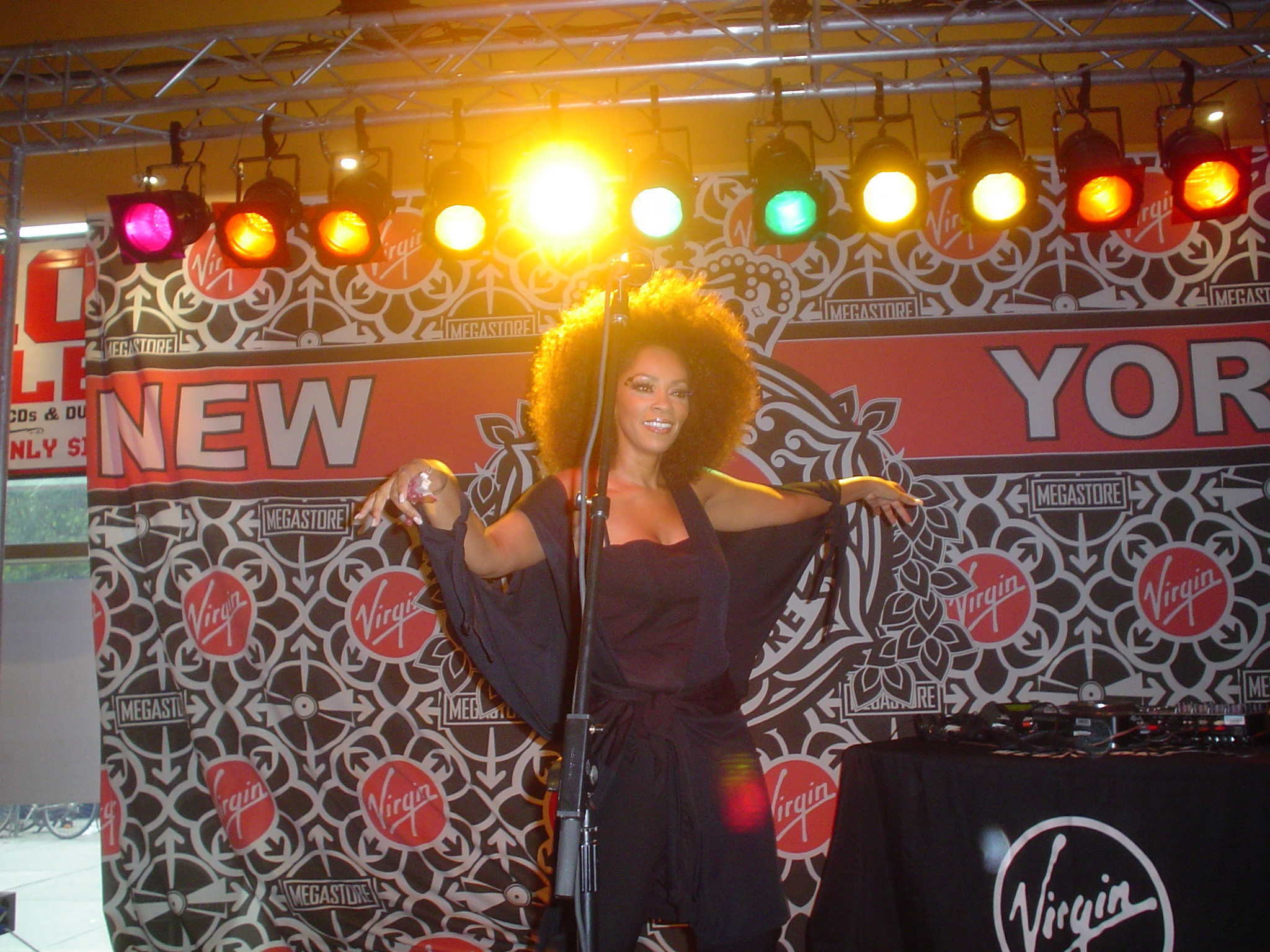
Jody Watley promoting The Makeover in-store, 2006

In 2007, Watley was ranked the fifth best selling Dance Club Songs artist on Billboard's year-end chart, while "I Want Your Love" and "Borderline" ranked in the top 20 of the Dance Club Songs list. In January 2008, "I Want Your Love" topped the UK dance charts in January, giving Watley her first UK mainstream dance hit in two decades. In 2008, she launched an online music store, while scoring another top five Billboard dance single with "A Beautiful Life," bringing the total of top five singles for The Makeover to three.

In May 2008, continuing over a decade of support for various charities dedicated to raising funds and awareness for HIV/AIDS, Watley performed at Life Ball, Europe's largest gala for the cause held in Vienna, Austria. In May 2009, Watley's Avitone signed a distribution deal with London-based Alternative Distribution Alliance Global where she released an "international" version of The Makeover that October to positive reviews. Pete Lewis from Blues & Soul noted her evolution as an artist and performer as being showcased on the album. Further stating Watley being hailed by some, as exemplifying the 21st-century recording artist continuing to exercise her own creative path. Distinguishable from the original release, The Makeover "International Edition" featured new cover art and track listing. New inclusions featured the bossa nova rendering of Bob Marley's "Waiting in Vain", a sparsely arranged version of Carole King's 1960s ballad "Will You Love Me Tomorrow", Erasure's anthem "A Little Respect", and a reworking of the Diana Ross hit "Love Hangover" that was faithful to the Ross disco original than the ambient version featured in the original issue of The Makeover, suggested by the song's co-writer Pam Sawyer. Reg Dancy from Basic Soul would write that Watley was able to handpick songs and make them seem as if they had been written for her. Added to the lineup of producers which included King Britt, Mark de Clive-Lowe, 4Hero, DJ Spinna and longtime co-collaborator Rodney Lee, are remixer/producers Marco Zappala from Brazil and Craig C. from the UK.

In February 2010, Watley joined Jamie Foxx onstage at a post-Grammy event for a duet performance of her signature hit "Looking For a New Love" and also appeared in the VH1 documentary Soul Train: The Hippest Trip In America. On October 27, 2012, Watley starred in the one time international humanitarian musical event Loving the Silent Tears with performers from 16 countries and cultures, created by Al Kasha, directed by Vincent Paterson and choreographed by Bonnie Story at The Shrine Auditorium in Los Angeles

Watley recorded collaborations with the electro pop duo French Horn Rebellion on singles titled "Cold Enough" and "Dancing Out" also featuring Young Empires in December 2012 and June 2013. Watley added high-profile summer concerts including Grammy All-Stars in Chengdu, China at Chengdu Sports Centre and Essence Music Festival in July 2013.

Watley released a new single "Nightlife", in 2013. The song, which marked a return to the disco sound in her early years, was a top five UK R&B hit and reached the top 20 of the Dance Club Songs chart in 2014.

==== 2014–present: Paradise, Shalamar Reloaded and recent releases ====
In July 2014, Watley dropped the EP, Paradise, through digital outlets and limited edition CDs through her website. Watley made headlines that same year after the singer announced that she had now claimed ownership of the name of her former group Shalamar, though this claim was contested numerous times in court. Watley hired two singer-dancers Rosero McCoy and Nate Allen Smith and added "Reloaded" in front of the name. The new act made their debut at the Howard Theatre in Washington, D.C.. Throughout 2015, Watley and Shalamar Reloaded toured in package concert sets with other acts. A performance by Watley and the group at her childhood hometown of Chicago in May 2015 was well received.

In July 2015, the group released their first single, "SlowDance", first through Avitone and then later distributed with the Spectra Music Group that October. Watley was a guest vocalist on Dam-Funk's second studio album, Invite the Light on the song "Virtuous Progression".

In 2016, Watley and Shalamar Reloaded dropped the singles, "O.R.I.G.I.N.A.L." and "The Mood". The following year, it was announced that Watley had changed the group's name to SRL, with Watley explaining she wanted a "fresh start" for her group without the negativity and baggage associated with the original Shalamar; later on the name changed again to Jody Watley & SRL (Soul Revolution Love). Due to these changes, previous releases associated with Shalamar Reloaded were removed from digital outlets with social media pages either updated or removed completely. A remix of "The Mood" by Italian producer Alex Di Cio, released in 2018, became an underground UK R&B hit. In August 2018, Watley and SRL dropped their final song, "The Passion", which also became an underground R&B hit in the UK. Watley cancelled her registration of the name Shalamar shortly thereafter and is no longer the registered owner of the USA Shalamar trademark according to the USPTO as of 2025. Watley returned to her solo career, releasing a smooth jazz remix of her previous cover of Bob Marley's "Waiting in Vain", which landed Watley her first Billboard chart entry since 2014, landing at the top 30 of its Smooth Jazz Airplay chart, peaking at number 25 that April. In 2020, Watley dropped her first solo EP in six years, Winter Nights. That project was then followed by "The Healing" and her first Christmas song, "Christmas Time is Here", followed by "Renderings" the next year. In November 2024, Watley was featured in the Canadian magazine, In Magazine, celebrating her 50-year career in show business. In July 2025, Watley released the remix compilation album, Let's Dance Vol. 1 – Hit Them Beats, through Avitone.

== Personal life and family ==
Watley has two children: a daughter, Lauren, with former fiancé and music producer Leon Sylvers III and a son Arie, with ex-husband André Cymone. She is the goddaughter of Jackie Wilson. Her younger sister is singer and former pornographic actress Michele Watley, better known as Midori.

== Influences ==
Her early music influences are Diana Ross, Donna Summer, Marvin Gaye, Stevie Wonder, Michael Jackson, The Jackson 5, The Carpenters, Roberta Flack, Prince, Madonna, Grace Jones and various jazz artists, including Nancy Wilson.

== Legacy ==
T-Boz of TLC cited Watley's song "Still a Thrill" as an example setting her vocal tone for her singing career. In a personal video, she sent to Watley (and was given permission to share on her YouTube channel) T-Boz thanked Watley for this song during her teenage years citing she was "hitting them notes" and helping her sing at a lower register to better suit her vocal range. Fellow TLC member Lisa Lopes was seen in a video pre-TLC dancing to Watley's song "Friends" which Watley acknowledged during one of her concerts.

Selena was influenced by Watley's song "Looking for a New Love" as the reason she wanted to crossover to the English-language market. Selena has also performed this song in concert which was notably documented in her Netflix bio-drama. Jody Watley is an influencer who brought high fashion mixed with street style, along with her signature hoop earrings to the mainstream, fashion magazine features, ad campaigns, a million-selling fitness video, the first Black woman on the cover of a Japanese fashion magazine and a style of branding an image now common in the music industry.

=== Influence on fashion ===
In 1987, Watley filmed the video to "Looking for a New Love" and made a conscious decision to use fashion to help her express her vision, wearing clothes and accessories from designers such as Issey Miyake and Philip Treacy. In 1990, Watley would continue to be involved with fashion. On her second album, she was photographed by fashion photographer Steven Meisel, where she continued to make her own style statements. In the videos for "Real Love", Watley would introduce a higher fashion aesthetic blending vintage and custom designs. "Friends" mixed couture by Jean-Paul Gaultier, with an urban sensibility. She released a million-selling home video, Dance to Fitness. She was featured in the first celebrity ad campaign for Gap LA Eyeworks and in magazines such as Harper's Bazaar, Vogue, Vogue Italia, Rolling Stone, Essence and Vanity Fair. She was named one of the 50 Most Beautiful People of 1990 in People.

In the same year, she contributed a jazzy rendition of "After You, Who?" the compilation album Red Hot + Blue, an AIDS-awareness charity recording of songs by Cole Porter produced by the Red Hot Organization. Watley was photographed by Victor Skrebneski, for the Saks Fifth Avenue Defining Style Fall Catalog, where she appeared in a 15-page high-fashion layout in 1996. In 2006, Watley would walk the runway with designer Kevan Hall for LA Fashion Week. The style icon is also noted as an influence on contemporary designer Malan Breton, contemporary A.Potts whose Spring/Summer 2021 collection was inspired by Watley and countless uncredited trends in contemporary style.

== Discography ==
Studio albums

- Jody Watley (1987)
- Larger than Life (1989)
- Affairs of the Heart (1991)
- Intimacy (1993)
- Affection (1995)
- Flower (1998)
- The Saturday Night Experience Volume 1 (1999)
- Midnight Lounge (2001)
- The Makeover (2006)

== Tours ==
- Larger Than Life Tour (1989)
- The Intimate Tour (1993)
- Colors of Christmas (2002)
- Superfreestyle Freestyle Explosion (2015/2016)

== Awards and nominations ==
=== Grammy Awards ===
Year	Nominee / work	Award	Result
1983	"Dead Giveaway"	Best R&B Performance by a Duo or Group with Vocals	Nominated
1988	Herself	Best New Artist	Won
1988	"Looking for a New Love"	Best R&B Vocal Performance, Female	Nominated

=== American Music Awards ===
Year	Nominee / work	Award	Result
1988	"Looking for a New Love"	Favorite Single (Soul/R&B)	Nominated

=== MTV Video Music Awards ===
Year	Nominee / work	Award	Result
1988	"Some Kind of Lover"	Best Female Video	Nominated
1988	"Some Kind of Lover"	Best New Artist in a Video	Nominated
1989	"Real Love"	Best Female Video	Nominated
1989	"Real Love"	Best Dance Video	Nominated
1989	"Real Love"	Breakthrough Video	Nominated
1989	"Real Love"	Best Direction in a Video	Nominated
1989	"Real Love"	Best Art Direction in a Video	Nominated
1989	"Real Love"	Best Editing in a Video	Nominated

=== Soul Train Music Awards ===
Year	Nominee / work	Award	Result
1988	"Looking for a New Love"	Best Music Video	Nominated
1988	"Looking for a New Love"	Best R&B/Soul Single, Female	Nominated
1988	Jody Watley	Best R&B/Soul Album, Female	Nominated

=== Billboard Awards ===
Year	Nominee / work	Award	Result
2007	Herself	Dance Lifetime Achievement Award	Won

== See also ==
- List of Billboard number-one dance club songs
- List of artists who reached number one on the U.S. Dance Club Songs chart
