= Don't You Want Me (Jody Watley song) =

Single by Jody Watley

from the album Jody Watley
- Released: August 1987
- Recorded: 1986
- Studio: Cherokee Studios (Los Angeles, CA); Baby O' Studios (Los Angeles, CA); Music Grinder Studios (Los Angeles, CA); Electric Lady Studios (New York, NY); Sarm West Studios (London, England)
- Length: 4:13
- Label: MCA
- Songwriters: Franne Golde; David Paul Bryant; Jody Watley
- Producer: Bernard Edwards

Jody Watley singles chronology
"Still a Thrill" (1987)	"Don't You Want Me" (1987)	"Some Kind of Lover" (1988)

Music video
- "Don't You Want Me" on YouTube

"Don't You Want Me" is a song by American singer Jody Watley from her 1987 eponymous debut studio album. It was released in August 1987, by MCA Records as the album's third single. The song was produced by Bernard Edwards and written by Franne Golde, David Paul Bryant and Watley.

"Don't You Want Me" was a hit in the United States, reaching number six on the Billboard Hot 100 and number one and three on the Dance Club Songs and Hot R&B/Hip-Hop Songs charts, respectively.

== Background and release ==
"Don't You Want Me" was one of the biggest crossover singles of 1987, reaching the Top Ten of the Billboard pop and R&B charts. The single was also popular in nightclubs, reaching the top spot of the Billboard dance chart.

== Sample usage ==
"Don't You Want Me" was sampled extensively on the 49ers' 1990 hit "Don't You Love Me". Remixed Eurodance versions have appeared on the Dancemania series of albums, including Dancemania SPEED 2 issued in 1999.

== Chart performance ==
"Don't You Want Me" landed in the Top 40 of the Hot 100 for the week of October 24, 1987, advancing from number 56 to 40. The single reached number six on December 19, 1987, and remained there for three consecutive weeks.

=== Charts ===
==== Weekly charts ====
Chart (1987–1988)	Peak position
Canada Top Singles (RPM)	24
Italy Airplay (Music & Media)	13
New Zealand (Recorded Music NZ)	46
South Africa (RISA)	21
UK Singles (Official Charts Company)	55
US Billboard Hot 100	6
US Dance Club Songs (Billboard)	1
US Hot R&B/Hip-Hop Songs (Billboard)	3
US Cash Box Top 100	5

==== Year-end charts ====
Chart (1987)	Position
US Dance Club Songs (Billboard)	30

Chart (1988)	Position
US Billboard Hot 100	55
