= Real Love (Jody Watley song) =

1989 single by Jody Watley

Single by Jody Watley

from the album Larger Than Life
- Released: March 18, 1989
- Genre: New jack swing
- Length: 4:23
- Label: MCA
- Songwriters: André Cymone; Jody Watley
- Producer: André Cymone

Jody Watley singles chronology
"Most of All" (1988)	"Real Love" (1989)	"Friends" (1989)

Music video
- "Real Love" on YouTube

"Real Love" is a song by American singer Jody Watley from her second studio album, Larger Than Life (1989). The single reached the number-one spot on the US Billboard Hot Black Singles and Dance Club Play charts. On the US Billboard Hot 100, "Real Love" peaked at number two for two weeks in May 1989. The song was also nominated for a Soul Train Music Award for Best Female Single.

== Music video ==
The music video premiered in March 1989. During mid-1989, Watley's "Real Love" video, directed by David Fincher, was nominated for six MTV Video Music Awards including Breakthrough Video, Best Art Direction, Best Dance Video, and Best Female Video at the 1989 award show. That record was held until Michael Jackson and Janet Jackson's "Scream" received 11 VMA nominations in 1995.

== Awards and nominations ==
Year	Award
1989	MTV Video Music Award nomination for Best Female Video for "Real Love"
1989	MTV Video Music Award nomination for Best Dance Video for "Real Love"
1989	MTV Video Music Award nomination for Best Direction for "Real Love"
1989	MTV Video Music Award nomination for Best Art Direction for "Real Love"
1989	MTV Video Music Award nomination for Best Editing for "Real Love"
1989	MTV Video Music Award nomination for Breakthrough Video for "Real Love"

== Track listings ==
7-inch, cassette, and Japanese mini-CD single

1. "Real Love" – 4:19
2. "Real Love" (instrumental) – 4:21

US, Canadian, and Australian 12-inch single

A1. "Real Love" (extended version) – 6:59
B1. "Real Love" (extended instrumental) – 7:40
B2. "Real Love" (dub version) – 6:15
B3. "Real Love" (Bassapella) – 4:28

UK 12-inch single

A1. "Real Love" (extended version) – 6:59
B1. "Real Love" (dub version) – 6:15
B2. "Real Love" (Bassapella) – 4:28

UK 12-inch remix single

A1. "Real Love" (Drive Time remix) – 5:40
B1. "Real Love" (extended instrumental) – 7:40

UK CD single

1. "Real Love" (7-inch version) – 4:19
2. "Real Love" (US radio edit) – 5:16
3. "Real Love" (extended version) – 6:59

European 12-inch single

A1. "Real Love" (extended version) – 6:59
B1. "Real Love" (dub version) – 6:15
B2. "Real Love" (7-inch version) – 4:19

German mini-CD single

1. "Real Love" (extended version) – 6:59
2. "Real Love" (7-inch version) – 4:19
3. "Real Love" (dub version) – 6:15

== Charts ==
=== Weekly charts ===
Chart (1989)	Peak position
Australia (ARIA)	78
Belgium (Ultratop 50 Flanders)	15
Canada (The Record)	6
Canada Top Singles (RPM)	2
Canada Dance/Urban (RPM)	2
Europe (Eurochart Hot 100)	55
Finland (Suomen virallinen lista)	22
Ireland (IRMA)	25
Italy Airplay (Music & Media)	11
Netherlands (Dutch Top 40)	19
Netherlands (Single Top 100)	21
New Zealand (Recorded Music NZ)	35
Switzerland (Schweizer Hitparade)	21
UK Singles (Official Charts)	31
US Billboard Hot 100	2
US 12-inch Singles Sales (Billboard)	2
US Dance Club Play (Billboard)	1
US Hot Black Singles (Billboard)	1
West Germany (GfK)	15

=== Year-end charts ===
Chart (1989)	Position
Canada Top Singles (RPM)	57
Canada Dance/Urban (RPM)	21
US Billboard Hot 100	46
US 12-inch Singles Sales (Billboard)	17
US Dance Club Play (Billboard)	5
US Hot Black Singles (Billboard)	25

== Certifications ==
Region	Certification	Certified units/sales
United States (RIAA)	Gold	500,000^{^}
^{^} Shipments figures based on certification alone.

== Release history ==
Region	Date	Format(s)	Label(s)	Ref.
United States	March 18, 1989	7-inch vinyl; 12-inch vinyl; cassette	MCA	
United Kingdom	March 28, 1989	7-inch vinyl; 12-inch vinyl; CD	MCA	
Japan	April 25, 1989	Mini-CD	MCA	
