= Looking for a New Love =

1987 single by Jody Watley

Single by Jody Watley

from the album Jody Watley
- Released: January 6, 1987
- Genre: Freestyle
- Length: 5:06 (album version); 3:56 (single version)
- Label: MCA
- Songwriters: André Cymone; Jody Watley
- Producers: André Cymone; David Z.

Jody Watley singles chronology
"Looking for a New Love" (1987)	"Still a Thrill" (1987)

Music video
- "Looking for a New Love" on YouTube

"Looking for a New Love" is a song by American dance-pop singer Jody Watley. It was released in January 1987 as the first single from her eponymous debut album. The song reached number two on the US Billboard Hot 100 and charted in several countries worldwide, peaking at number one in Canada. Watley re-recorded and re-issued the song in various remixes in 2005. The song also appears in the 2026 video game Grand Theft Auto VI.

== Background ==
While listening to a tape of instrumental tracks given to her by producer André Cymone, Watley reflected on a recent sour romantic breakup. Fusing her own feelings of "I'll show you" with the feel of the track, Watley came up with the basic premise of "Looking for a New Love." The released record is the eight-track demo of the song; that way the emotional urgency of Watley's vocal was still intact. One of the song's key phrases became a popular saying: "Hasta la vista, baby." It wound up on innumerable answering machines and was used by Arnold Schwarzenegger in the 1991 film Terminator 2: Judgment Day (see Hasta la vista, baby).

== Reception ==
The single hit number two for four consecutive weeks on the US Billboard Hot 100 in May 1987 and spent three weeks at number one on the Billboard Hot Black Singles chart. It ranked number 16 on Billboard's year-end chart for 1987. The song also reached number one on the RPM Singles Chart in Canada. In 1988, the song was nominated for two Soul Train Music Awards for Best R&B/Soul or Rap Music Video, and Best R&B/Soul Single, Female, losing to Janet Jackson's "Control" and Anita Baker's "Sweet Love". She was also nominated for a Grammy Award for Best Female R&B Vocal Performance, losing to Aretha Franklin's album, Aretha.

== Music video ==
A music video, directed by Brian Grant was released in March 1987 to promote the song. Grant previously made videos for Whitney Houston, Peter Gabriel and Tina Turner.

== 2005 version ==
"Looking for a New Love '05"

Single by Jody Watley
- Released: February 14, 2005
- Label: Curvve; Avitone; Peace Bisquit
- Songwriters: André Cymone; Jody Watley
- Producers: Jody Watley; Bill Coleman; Vinny Troia

Jody Watley singles chronology
"Whenever" (2003)	"Looking for a New Love '05" (2005)	"Borderline" (2006)

In 2005, Jody Watley re-recorded and released "Looking for a New Love" on Curvve Recordings in conjunction with her own Avitone label and Peace Bisquit. The newly imagined "Looking for a New Love" peaked at number one on the Hot Dance Music/Club Play chart.

== Awards and nominations ==
Year	Award
1987	Grammy Award nomination for Best Female R&B Vocal Performance for "Looking for a New Love"
1988	Soul Train Music Award nomination for Single of the Year (Female) for '"Looking for a New Love"
1988	Soul Train Music Award nomination for Best Music Video for '"Looking for a New Love"
1988	American Music Award nomination for Favorite Soul/R&B Single for "Looking For A New Love

== Track listing ==
Maxi-CD 2005

No.	Title	Length
1.	"Looking for a New Love" (ROCAsound radio edit)	4:32
2.	"Looking for a New Love" (ROCAsound mix)	7:30
3.	"Looking for a New Love" (Chus & Ceballos mix)	9:50
4.	"Looking for a New Love" (Craig C. mix)	8:25
5.	"Baby Baby" (DJ Tool)	0:31
6.	"Looking for a New Love" (Chris Joss vocal mix)	5:45
7.	"Looking for a New Love" (Chris Joss Stripped vocal mix)	4:48
8.	"Looking for a New Love" (Levon Vincent mix)	6:45
9.	"Looking for a New Love" (GoodandEvil mix)	4:53
10.	"I Needed You" (DJ Tool)	0:36
11.	"Looking for a New Love" (Heinrich Z mix) (Ultimix edit)	5:52

== Charts ==
=== Weekly charts ===
Chart (1987)	Peak position
Australia (Kent Music Report)	13
Belgium (Ultratop 50 Flanders)	24
Canada Top Singles (RPM)	1
Europe (European Hot 100 Singles)	15
Greece (IFPI)	3
Ireland (IRMA)	16
Italy Airplay (Music & Media)	2
Netherlands (Dutch Top 40)	36
Netherlands (Single Top 100)	37
New Zealand (Recorded Music NZ)	5
Switzerland (Schweizer Hitparade)	11
UK Singles (Official Charts)	13
US Billboard Hot 100	2
US 12-inch Singles Sales (Billboard) Remix	1
US Dance Club Play (Billboard) Remix	1
US Hot Black Singles (Billboard)	1
US Cash Box Top 100	2
West Germany (GfK)	25

Chart (2005)	Peak position
US Dance Club Play (Billboard) Remixes	1

=== Year-end charts ===
Chart (1987)	Position
Canada Top Singles (RPM)	41
US Billboard Hot 100	16
US 12-inch Singles Sales (Billboard)	6
US Dance Club Play (Billboard)	9
US Hot Black Singles (Billboard)	8
US Cash Box Top 100	10

Chart (2005)	Position
US Dance Club Play (Billboard)	35

== Certifications ==
Region	Certification	Certified units/sales
Canada (Music Canada)	Gold	50,000^{^}
^{^} Shipments figures based on certification alone.

== Release history ==
Region	Date	Format(s)	Label(s)	Ref.
United States	January 6, 1987	7-inch vinyl; 12-inch vinyl; cassette	MCA	
United Kingdom	April 27, 1987	7-inch vinyl; 12-inch vinyl	MCA	

== See also ==
- List of number-one dance singles of 2005 (U.S.)
