= André Cymone =

American musician (born 1958)

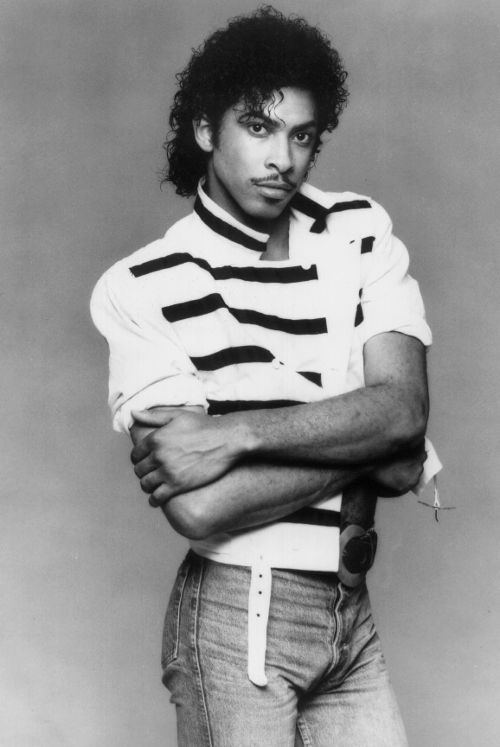
- Cymone in 1982

Background information
- Born: Andre Simon Anderson; June 27, 1958 (age 68); Minneapolis, Minnesota, U.S.
- Genres: Minneapolis sound; new wave; funk
- Occupations: Musician; singer; songwriter; record producer
- Instruments: Bass; guitar; piano; drums; vocals
- Years active: 1974–present
- Labels: Columbia; Blindtango
- Website: andrecymone.com

André Cymone (born Andre Simon Anderson; June 27, 1958) is an American bassist, songwriter and record producer. He was a bass guitarist for Prince's touring band, pre-Revolution. In 1981, Cymone broke from Prince's band and began a solo career. As a solo artist, he released Livin' in the New Wave, Survivin' in the 80's and A.C., all of which were well-received studio albums. The fusion of new wave and funk explored on these albums spawned half a dozen hit R&B singles. His song "The Dance Electric" was written by Prince and reached #10 on the R&B charts in 1985. Cymone later co-wrote and produced hit songs for other acts, including his then wife Jody Watley's "Looking for a New Love" and "Real Love".

With his futurist Minneapolis vision, Cymone has been credited with creating some of the most innovative music during the late 1970s and 1980s, and is regarded as an unsung architect of Minneapolis' identity as a music capital.

Cymone's stage name comes from a variation of his middle name, Simon.

== Biography ==
=== Early years ===
Cymone was born in Minneapolis, Minnesota. The son of Fred Anderson, a musician, and Bernadette, a social worker, Cymone was the youngest of six children. The Anderson home soon had an additional member – a young Prince, who left his own home due to conflicts with his father. Prince's cousin Charles Smith started the band Grand Central and later invited Cymone. The band included Cymone's sister Linda and Morris Day — they later changed their name to Champagne due to being confused with the funk band Graham Central Station. Around this same, in 1975, Pepe Willie (the former husband of another of Prince's cousins), started the funk band 94 East, with members Cymone and Prince.

=== Career ===
In the late 1970s, after Prince released his debut album, For You, Prince recruited Cymone as bassist for his touring band. Cymone stayed with Prince until 1981, when he quit the band over tensions with Prince.

The two later resolved their issues and Cymone, managed by Owen Husney, went on to release three solo albums – Livin' In The New Wave (1982), Survivin' in the 80's (1983), and AC (1985). All were out of print for a long period of time, but all three of his solo records have been remastered and expanded with extra tracks. His only successful single – a song written by Prince – was "The Dance Electric" from AC.

Cymone went on to become a producer and is better known for producing Jody Watley (to whom he was married and shares a son). He has also produced and written songs for several other artists, including Evelyn "Champagne" King, Pebbles, Jermaine Stewart, The Girls, Pretty Poison and Adam Ant. In 1988, Cymone produced three tracks and co-wrote the track "Under My Skin" for Phil Thornalley's 1988 only solo album, Swamp.

His song "Better Way", performed by James Ingram, and "Love/Hate", performed by Pebbles were featured on the Beverly Hills Cop II soundtrack released in 1987. Cymone stepped away from the spotlight in the late 1980s, to focus on raising his children while channeling his creative urges into a variety of writing projects.

In September 2012, Cymone released a digital single, titled "America", in aid of United States President Barack Obama's re-election campaign, with all proceeds from the sale of the digital single being donated to the campaign. The single is available through andrecymone.bandcamp.com, via digital download. A sneak peek at a new song titled "American Dream" was available for a limited time for everyone who donated by purchasing "America".

In 2012, Cymone confirmed he was working on a new album, ending a 27-year singing hiatus.

In May 2013, Cymone released a demo on his Twitter/Facebook page called "My Best Friend", a six-minute acoustic track he described as a tribute to his mother Bernadette Anderson.

In late May 2013, Cymone appeared alongside former Revolution member Bobby Z on a web-based video chat forum co-hosted by celebrity blogger Dr. Funkenberry, where he went into greater detail about the writing of the song and the hopes for his new album.

In November 2013, the album, titled The Stone, became available for pre-order in various exclusive packages on the site PledgeMusic. The packages included early MP3 downloads, signed CDs and one-off personalised items. The Stone was released on February 18, 2014.

André Cymone released his sixth studio album, 1969, on April 7, 2017, via Bandcamp and iTunes.

== Discography ==
=== Albums and EPs ===
- Livin' in the New Wave (1982)
- Survivin' in the 80's (1983)
- A.C. (1985)
- The Stone (2014)
- Black Man In America EP (2016)
- 1969 (2017)
- The Resurrection of Funk (2026)

=== Singles ===
- "Livin' in the New Wave" (1982)
- "Kelly's Eyes" (1982)
- "Survivin' in the 80's" (1983)
- "Make Me Wanna Dance" (1983)
- "What Are We Doing Here" (1983)
- "Body Thang" (1983)
- "The Dance Electric" (1985)
- "Satisfaction" (1985)
- "Lipstick Lover" (1985)
- "America" (2012)
- "American Dream" (2012)
- "Trayvon" (2013)
- "Naked (Harts Remix)" (2014)
- "Vote" (2014)
- "Bounce" (2015)
- "Give Peace A Chance (2015)" (2015)
- "VOTE! 2018" (2018)
- "Our World Is On Fire" (2020)
- "Funk is Alive" (2024)
- "Hot Funk in the Summertime" (2024)
