= Remixes of Love =

Remix album by Jody Watley
- Released: June 6, 1994
- Recorded: 1990–1993
- Genre: R&B; dance; pop
- Length: 69:01
- Label: MCA
- Producer: Larry Robinson; David Morales; MK; P.M. Dawn; Bobby Brooks; Dave Way; Meech Wells

Jody Watley chronology
Intimacy (1993)	''Remixes of Love'' (1994)	Affection (1995)

Remixes of Love is a 1994 remix album by American R&B/pop singer, Jody Watley. Released in Japan only, the album is Watley's second full-length compilation of remixes after You Wanna Dance with Me?. Watley's Remixes of Love contains remixes of select songs from the albums Affairs of the Heart and Intimacy.

== Track listing ==
No.	Title	Writer(s)	Producer(s)	Length
1.	"Your Love Keeps Working on Me" (Extended MK Mix)	Joey Diggs; John Barnes; Robert White	Mark Kinchen	5:42
2.	"Your Love Keeps Working on Me" (MK Brooklyn Mix)		Kinchen	7:18
3.	"Your Love Keeps Working on Me" (Remix)		Dave Way	4:20
4.	"When a Man Loves a Woman" (Dance Radio Edit)	Jody Watley; Larry "Rock" Campbell	Larry Robinson	4:21
5.	"When a Man Loves a Woman" (Hip Hop Remix)		Meech Wells; Def Jef	5:26
6.	"When a Man Loves a Woman" (Remix Radio Edit)		P.M. Dawn	4:30
7.	"I Want You" (Funk You Up Extended Mix)	Watley	Bobby Brooks	5:43
8.	"I Want You" (In My House Version)		Brooks	6:30
9.	"I Want You" (Ultimate Love Letter Mix)		Brooks	7:16
10.	"I'm the One You Need" (Radio Edit)	Alec Shantzis; Watley	David Morales	5:10
11.	"I'm the One You Need" (Def Dub Version)		Morales	5:21
12.	"I'm the One You Need" (Extended Club Version)		Morales	7:21
Total length:				69:01

== Personnel ==
- Jody Watley – vocals, background vocals
- Larry "Rock" Campbell – keyboards, drum programming,
- André Cymone – background vocals, drums, bass guitar, keyboards
- David Morales – drums
- Peter "Ski" Schwartz – piano
- Brenda White-King, Paulette McWilliams, Alfa Anderson Barfield – background vocals on "I'm the One You Need".

Production

- Remix producers – David Morales, P.M. Dawn, Bobby Brooks, Larry Robinson, Dave Way, Meech Wells
