= Kevin Spencer (TV series) =

1999-2005 Canadian TV series

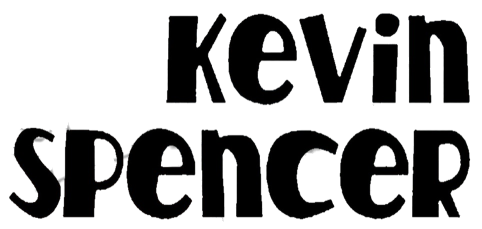
- Genre: Adult animation Black comedy Sitcom
- Created by: Greg Lawrence
- Based on: The Great Canadian Shorts: Kevin Spencer
- Written by: Rick Kaulbars; Greg Lawrence; David Elver (2004)
- Directed by: David Bigelow; Adrienne Reid (1999–2001); Brad Summerfield
- Voices of: Greg Lawrence; Thomasin Langlands; Michael Wetmore; David Bigelow; David Elver; Robin Kyle Smith; David L. McCallum; Louise Reny(Season 8 theme song vocalist); Connie Bernadi; Wallis Giunta; Norman Mikeal-Berketa; Lisa McRae; Walt Conrad; Lily Warren; Gabrielle Mackenzie; Howard Sonneburg; Eric Saralut
- Narrated by: Greg Lawrence
- Theme music composer: Serge Côté; David Bigelow (Except Season 4)
- Composers: Serge Côté; Howard Sonneburg (Audio mix); Brad Summerfield(Audio post); Nick Summerfield(Audio post)
- Country of origin: Canada
- Original language: English
- No. of seasons: 8
- No. of episodes: 113 (list of episodes)

Production
- Producers: Greg Lawrence; Erik Gustafsson
- Animators: Frank Burelle; Liette Bettez; Lily Warren; Hellen Dardik; Eric Sarault; Jeremy Johnson; Peter Thomas; Sean Cusson; Michael Wetmore(Only season one)
- Editors: David Bigelow; Adrienne Reid(1999-2001)
- Running time: 22-23 minutes
- Production companies: Ocnus Productions; Atomic Productions
- Budget: $29,900 (Per episode)

Original release
- Network: CTV/The Comedy Network
- Release: January 17, 1999 – November 6, 2005

Related
- Buzz (TV series); Odd Job Jack; Butch Patterson: Private Dick; The Kids in the Hall; The Great Canadian Shorts: Kevin Spencer

Kevin Spencer (subtitled "The Lovable Little Scamp" from seasons 3-4) is a Canadian adult animated black comedy television series created by Greg Lawrence that aired on CTV and The Comedy Network (now CTV Comedy Channel) from January 17, 1999 to November 6, 2005. It is based on the shorts of the same name that premiered on the Burly Bear Network in 1998(which Lawrence refers to as the 'Great Canadian Shorts'). It also aired on Spike TV in the United States, and Cuatro in Spain. In April 2001, the original thirteen 1997–1998 shorts were remade and released on Mondo Media's flash cartoon site in the United States in 2002. Also around 2001 the shorts were remade on Canal 33, now called El 33. The show was originally going to be a claymation or a Barbie doll style stop motion based off its trivia rather than Adobe this was likely cut due to budget reasons or either Lawrence's desire to be more similar to South Park with crudely made characters.

The series follows 16-year-old silent protagonist Kevin W. Spencer (earlier Kevin E. Spencer), described by the show's theme song as a "chain-smoking alcoholic sociopath", as well as his parents Percy and Anastasia and his supposedly imaginary friend Allen the Magic Goose.

== Plot & Main Characters ==
The show revolves around the everyday happenings of the Spencer family within a town by the name of Cornolia (later called Landville). Kevin himself is a 16-year-old, sociopathic juvenile delinquent addicted to alcohol, cough syrup, tobacco and sniffing paint. He lives with his parents, whom he often shows ambivalence towards. Kevin is also a student at a local high school, although he rarely attends school. It is demonstrated many times throughout the series that Kevin is mentally unstable, as he is prone to random outbursts of violence, even towards himself, shows signs of insanity, and has a complete disregard for life, including his own. It is also shown that Kevin is most likely intellectually disabled, as he often has difficulties with performing the simplest of tasks, such as making himself a bowl of cereal, forgetting what he was talking about the instant after saying something, or even realizing that he was hungry. Though, at times throughout the series, Kevin makes very well-articulated statements about certain aspects of society, culture, politics, and education, possibly indicating Kevin is a savant.

Throughout the series, Kevin almost never speaks, aside from during dream sequences and occasional one-sentenced outbursts that the viewer only sees as speech or thought balloons. Instead, the show's narrator (voiced by Lawrence) speaks for Kevin; that is, he describes what Kevin is saying, thinking, and how Kevin reacts to the world around him. Kevin finally does speak in Season 2, Episode 17 (Dreamland), but only in his dreams, and he has a noticeably female-sounding voice. At the end of Season 4's finale "Beach Blanket Bloodbath", Kevin screams "FUCK OFF!!"; he also says "Goodbye Allen" in the series finale though is spoke over by Lawrence. Kevin is also based off a man who lived near Lawrence in Belleville, Ontario in a news interview. He is also mentioned to have other mental illnesses and physical problems than Antisocial Personality Disorder such as Attention Deficit Hyperactivity Disorder, Nocturnal Enuresis (as mentioned in a blurry list in A First Time For Everything), Premature Ejaculation (implied in ’The Hooker’ 1998 short and Psychiatrist No.1), chlamydia and psychosis. Kevin’s first signs of illness was a few weeks after his birthday seventh birthday of April 16, 1990, when he would murder is pet poodle Ollie after having a unbearable rage in his head. In the 'Invisible Sociopath' his birthday is show as April 16, 1984, therefore the series taking place during the year 2000 except the Potted Goose that takes place from the Christmas of 1999. Kevin also shows a liking to true detective novels despite being illiterate at times.

His parents, Anastasia (voiced by Thomasin Langlands) and Percy (voiced by Lawrence), are also alcoholic chain-smokers. Both are crude, stupid people who live off of welfare. Both parents neglect or otherwise use Kevin for their own selfish gains, and both show clear signs of sociopathic tendencies. Neither parent is faithful to the other, and Anastasia in particular is highly promiscuous. Their antics usually involve attempting to gain money or alcohol through illegal acts, which quite randomly succeed or fail. While both parents primarily show hatred and disgust towards one another, both occasionally demonstrate a small degree of lust for each other, though these moments rarely last longer than a scene of an episode.

== Descriptions & Side Characters ==
Anastasia Spencer (Née Blunt) was born in 1960 in a traveler family, she would start smoking at the age of nine to fit in with others around the same time she met a boy by the name of Derk of which she agreed to go around on a drive with him to a Lovers' Lane where he was murdered by a escapee of a mental institution nearby she started to drink alcohol after the incident, at the age of thirteen she would lose virginity to a clown. In 1978 her obsession with clowns continued until she would travel with ‘Large Mike’s Rodeo And Rope Trick Caravan’. After awhile, a clown by the stage name of Happy was injured by a bull, a day after the incident she had enough prostrating for clowns, so Large Mike would get rid of her but before, Anastasia would have the last laugh by stealing his wallet and how Happy gave her syphilis. After hitchhiking she would she saw Percy driving away from the police after carjacking a chip truck, both eyes met before Percy then crashed into a convoy of police cars while reversing, later in April 16th 1984 they would have two children Bradley and Kevin, though they didn’t have essentials to take care of both so the would put up Bradley for adoption since compared to Kevin, he made sounds which Percy found annoying and since Kevin was the first born. Throughout the show Anastasia prostates for multiple people including Charlie Plunt, Marty McMurphy (a bartender), Vivica Royd (a corporal) along with many others. As mentioned throughout the series, she has untreated syphilis, contaminating both Percy and Marty with it.

Percy B. Spencer, born 1960, was an overachiever at school and a descendant of 'blind inbred mountain people', who had a long history of substance abuse'. At the age of 7, his father would take him out with his brother Lester for baseball. Unfortunately, his brother accidentally swung the bat too hard, causing the ball to hit him straight in the forehead, causing internal bleeding. Mr. Spencer was upset by the incident and understand his problem so he promised after his boss came to the house and give him a promotion he would work his hardest for medical treatment. Unfortunately once Mr. Spencer's boss arrived Percy would set fire to the house with a cigarette, his father would have his promotion rejected and was fired. After the incident he would physically abuse Percy and become a dedicated dog breeder and video rental shop owner. At the age of 12 he would bully classmates and beg stranger to by him a 12 pack of beer constantly. From 16 to 39 he would be arrest by Sergeant Jones 52 times. Throughout the age of 18 Percy would drift through Canada nearby his home town of Nashville, he was charged of vagrancy multiple times before the judge told him he would be arrested and put in jail if he doesn’t get a job, so he joined the Canadian Army, though later honorably discharged after assaulting multiple recruits and even the Drill Sergeant before attempting to escape though having a stroke, Percy was then put in the medical bay after, once he recovered he would steal morphine and percodan and sell the drugs to teenagers at an arcade and went on a three week drinking binge from the money, after Percy became broke he went back to the army base to sleep there and get more drugs, once he came back the drill sergeant told Percy that he was dishonorably discharged, Percy didn’t understand the term dishonorably discharged, in case the sergeant was flirting with in Percy would punch him in the larynx and stole some more pills and left. A few years later he would meet Charlie Plunt starting a rock band and keeping in contact after. In 1984 he would carjack a ‘chip wagon’ along with stealing 27 Canadian Dollars during the chase his eyes would meet with a woman by the name of Anastasia Blunt, it was love at first sight until he crashed, he would later have two sons children inside of a caravan, since they lacked the essentials of supporting two sons they had to put up one for adoption, both agreed on Bradley due to the fact he made sounds and wasn’t the first born. Throughout the series Percy tried to get Kevin to do jobs for him such as robbing a liquor store or lighting his cigarettes which usually he fails. He also takes him fishing in a contaminated river by various factories and illegal hunting in forests with Plunt and Phillipe Spencer (his cousin). Percy often says misinformation about his past, mainly because of memory loss caused by alcohol, such false thing he said are; his him being a failure since his father only spent money on alcohol, being Dan B. Cooper, his father shooting his way out of a Venezuelan Prison, his father participating in the Richard Riot and the thought of the baseball incident never happening. His favourite animal is a ostrich. Percy’s catchphrases include; “Got smokes?”, “Homos is wrong.”, “[Reason], so F off!” and “Somethings wrong with that kid.”

Another frequent character in the show is Kevin's imaginary friend, Allen the Magic Goose (voiced by Mike Wetmore). Allen often encourages Kevin's sociopathic nature, normally asking him to do illegal, indecent, and/or dangerous things simply for the sake of the thrill or for vengeance. However, Kevin often shows ambivalence towards Allen, sometimes threatening or intimidating the bird. During such times, Allen often reminds Kevin of the futility of these outbursts, since Kevin is simply imagining Allen's existence. However, in Season 2, Episode 12 (The Potted Goose), Kevin and Allen have a falling out and go their separate ways, and it's revealed that Allen and other "imaginary" friends can leave their hosts and "find another head to live in". Allen tries living in the heads of other humans (during which time Kevin can no longer see Allen), including Percy, one of Kevin's teachers, Charlie Plunt, and the Widow Coulson. Meanwhile, Kevin tries out new imaginary friends, including Hacky the Cigar-Smoking Rollerskating Monkey, Zoltron (a robot that doesn't know the difference between a transformer and a transvestite), and a pimple-faced nerd who’s sent by Kevin’s ‘temp agent’. Neither Kevin nor Allen can find a suitable replacement, and reconcile at the end of the episode. In ‘Fire Starter’ Allen was implied that he may have he was Satan though this is not proven. Axe Monkey is his arch nemesis, being the manifestation of Kevin's fears.

Charlie Plunt (voiced by Mike Wetmore) is Percy's friend, a truck driving cowboy wannabe and a weed farmer. Charlie is skinny with a handlebar mustache, sporting a “belt buckle thicker than canned ham.” He was abandoned as an infant by his mother(whose religion and name is unspecified ), she offered Plunt as a sacrifice to her idol at the site of a mountain. A blind hermit would find the infant Plunt, and raise him as his own son, he was an alcoholic who would shake Plunt as an infant. Unfortunately after drinking too much alcohol making him think he was Jesus, he would lose balance and trip into a fire place, the flames would consume their cabin, Plunt moved on to meet and be indoctrinated into a Neo-Nazi terrorist organisation run by a German hippie only mentioned by a sign as Herr Swartz. Plunt was tasked with moving weapons, this was ended when he was caught smuggling M16 rifles by the law enforcement, despite Plunt only being searched by the authorities, the rest of the extremists ran off while law enforcement tried to gun them down. Plunt later took up disco dancing as a hobby in the 1970s, frequenting bars, and discotheques. It was this fading passion that led him to cross paths with local juvenile delinquent, and alcoholic, Percy B. Spencer. The two formed a punk rock band during the early 1980s. Both played heavy metal guitars as the only band members. Every time Percy was incarcerated, Charlie shacked up with Anastasia, while insulting and making fun of both Percy and Kevin at the same time. After countless setbacks, Plunt managed to pull through in receiving his grade 10 education. An amateur country music artist, and a "truckstop Casanova". Plunt was believed to be Kevin's biological father, though this was disproven later on. Plunt is known to also mock Kevin, and drink Percy's personal liquor. Charlie would overcharge Percy for selling drugs. Percy often viewed Charlie as a freeloader, with a drug habit.

Another frequent character is Shauna A. F. (voiced by Tori Hammond); Shauna is Kevin's love interest. Throughout the series, we see her slowly become more and more sociopathic and violent, eventually killing her mother. It is revealed that Shawna's cannabis smoking father, B. C. Bud broke up with her mother ever since she stabbed him in a violent, drunken rage.

Bradley DePalma (né Spencer) is Kevin Spencer's brother. He was adopted by the DePalma family after Percy and Anastasia chose Kevin to be their only child since, unlike Bradley, he never make a sound which they considered easier, and also since Kevin was their first born. Bradley appears in the very first episode as a baby, then is never mentioned again until "Homunculus" 3 seasons and 7 episodes later.

Doctor J. Franklin (voiced by Mike Wetmore and later Robin Smith) is Kevin's pyrophobic psychiatrist and the main antagonist. Often Franklin tries to understand Kevin though this leads to Kevin either throwing things at him or starting fires causing him to have nervous breakdowns, he later loses his job and tries to kill Kevin in season 8 after Kevin drives him insane multiple times throughout the show, not much is known about his past. In season one after being sent to the asylum for the first time he is replaced with his violent and uncaring brother while in season 2 he is replaced with Dr. Goodwill(voiced by Norman Mikeal-Berketa). He is the only character other than Allen to be real, being a goose as well as shown in the finale. He got his certificate of psychiatry on April 1st 1990 at the ‘Grenada School of Headcases’.

Porn Man and Afro Man are two unnamed pornographic film actors and partners who appear throughout the show appearing in and thinking of ideas for films and hosting house parties of which Percy tries to crash. Porn Man’s uncle died in the Vietnam War, he looked up to Clint Eastwood and later became Cornolia’s/Landville’s most famous porn star duo with Afro Man. Afro Man (real name possibly Billy Stud as shown on his tank top in Life Lessons [15:14]) (Voiced by Robin Smith) was born in the United States later moving with his family to Canada in the 1970’s. He later became an education film actor appearing in one film about intimacy. He considered on being a security guard but later became a porn star. They are also might be paedophiles as mentioned in The Widow Coulson when Pornman says "What do you mean seventeen?".

Timmy McNaughton (originally called Timmy Wilkins) (voiced by Robin Smith) is one of Kevin’s few friends, and a self deemed outcast. Similar to Kevin they both commit crimes (McNaughton doing it for the sake of getting his parents reaction) and having a love interest for Shawna (him being her ex-boyfriend), his parents are addicted to sex tapes and are much richer than Kevin’s, some of the time he makes fun of Kevin for his issues. Since he is only once referred as Timmy Wilkins it could be his mothers maiden name therefore his full name may be Timmy McNaughton-Wilkins.

Marty McMurphy, simply referred to as "The Bartender" (voiced by David McCallum) is an Irish bartender and one of the affairs of Anastasia. He sometimes overcharges his customers and also chases them down for not tipping.

Gale Coulson (more known as the Widow Coulson) is an old lady obsessed with writing death threats and her dead husband Herman, she debuted in the episode of the same name. According her (which the claims are most likely not true due to her mental state), she was a survivor of the RMS Titanic due to the fact she ordered shipmen to threat third class passengers with guns away from her and Hermans life boat, they then became a musical duo with her as the violinist, unfortunately Herman’s accordion would exploded on him. She then move to Montreal and became a member of the FLQ where she blew up mail boxes. After that she had an affair with René Simard, due to her political beliefs she then left him. She may have obesity, insomnia high blood pressure and menopause based on her pill colours and what side effects it did to Kevin when he was stealing her medicine. She also may have psychosis based on her strange shrine of Herman and the fact she has his skeleton at the back of his beloved Ford Model-T(Though she claims that he wants to be buried with it but she still uses it so that’s the best choice according to her).

Man No.2 is a unnamed man who often causes accidents injuring or killing other and injuring himself which Lawrence says makes the writers laugh. He is a lawyer, outside of that(referring to his hobbies) he is a taxidermist and a base jumper. He is often harassed by other characters, in the finale he tries to shoot and kill everyone after being driven to his breaking point.

The Benson’s are a rich family made up of Mr Benson, Jane Benson and Billy Benson. Mr and Mrs Jane Benson show extreme hatred towards the Spencer’s and want them dead, they also believe that poor people should be separated from the rich, they barley have sex and have been married for twelve years. Unlike his parents Billy is actually a good natured person, though Anastasia calls him fruity for accidentally landing on Kevin after Mr. Benson fell off a ladder and catapulted him over the fence, he is presumably twelve or younger.

=== Recurring Characters ===
Peter Lefley Wilcox simply referred as Pete is a mentally ill Vietnam War veteran and friend of Kevin. A student at JC's Seminary, Pete believed in what he thought what God wanted, so once he was 18 he instantly joined the Vietnam War as he believed that god wanted him to do so, throughout the war he gained many stress related problems and a addiction to LSD and cannabis, from this he suffered Multiple Personality Disorder(Dissociative Identity Disorder). Once he returned to his home town Packenham, Ontario preaching on streets about God, later being fished out by a fashion designer while trying to find some clothes for Brandy one of his personas for a before model, later on the designer thought it was funny to put Wilcox in with the actual fashion models to his surprise Pete was a success and both him a Pete became very wealthy though Pete spent his money gold plating his mobile home instead of investing after a few days Pete lost is job after having a panic attack while taking photo shots. After this Pete drifted around North America later sticking up a JC Penney's in the United States to hold a fashion show. After being detained the court ruled him criminally insane and he was sent back to Canada to serve his time in a asylum by the name of the ‘Broken Head Inn’ and continue his seminary studies. One day Pete was having a man read the Bible to him and was struggling the change from weight loss pills to lithium, until a prisoner called Kevin Spencer entered, Pete instantly thought Kevin was the second coming, Kevin then decided to go along with it to exploit Pete's illness later in the day Pete was diagnosed with narcolepsy. From the rest of the series on Pete serves Kevin through his various personalities such as Brandeen "Brandy" Love (An 18 year old exotic dancer and stripper), Leonardo DeCaprio, Madame Esmerlda (A dominatrix), a 1957 John Deere Tractor, a border collie and Archduke Franz Ferdinand In Black Like Percy, Pete send an envelope saying he is going to be executed in Texas.

Officer Bill Walt and his unnamed female partner are two irresponsible police officers who debut in the first episode of season two, they often appear assaulting immigrants, minorities and those who have less advantage in a fight(such as Percy in 'The Crime Fighting Vagina' when he was stuck in a elevator shaft).

Mr. Biggas (more known as Mr. Bigass) is the Principal of Fairview Public School (Alternatively named Landville Public School and Generic Public High School) who debuts in Allen The Magic Goose yelling at Kevin for hitting the other fifth graders with a badminton racket( and presumably setting the parking lot on fire). Compared to his other appearances his debut only shows him on the side view yelling at Kevin and is bald. Later in the New Mr. Franklin he has to do a fundraiser for spending the school money on a hair transplant for himself. He later appears in the ‘Widow Coulson’ and most of season two, which is implied while Kevin was searching through trash that he wears adult diapers presumably giving him the appearance of a big ass, also compared to his season one appearances (not including his debut) he has black hair.

John “Chewy” McCaffery is a farmer with questionable methods of getting people to work. He debuts in A Pillar of Community as Kevin’s mentor and boss for civil service, he chews tobacco, and threatens Kevin multiple times to work without experience, he has a skeleton in the farmyard(presumably a relative of his), as shown in a season 2 episode he, in 1989 on a VHS tape exclaims he hates his life and runs into a farmhouse and off camera, fired a shotgun which he exclaimed “Not quite dead yet!” this could imply that he either shot a man(explaining the skeleton) or attempted suicide. His friends called him Chewie because he chews tobacco, his friends are seen in Psychiatrist No.1 beating and doing acts of sodomy towards Percy after he fell through the roof of their shed.

Phillipe Spencer(voiced by Mike Wetmore), referred to as Phil, is Kevin’s cousin gun toting who appears throughout season one as a side character. As a child he had a jealousy of a kid who’s family could afford a bicycle, Phil’s family could not so Phil instantly thought that the kid was teasing him, so he beat up the kid and stole his bike, he was arrested. Phil appears to be one of Percy’s hunting buddies along with Plunt, despite showing enthusiasm for hunting he along with the others are too lazy to actually hunt and instead sit around drinking booze and shooting random things such as beer bottles and cars. He may have been a former moonshine brewer as shown in Life Lessons that he was giving Percy shots while he was driving and in the last episode he was mentioned in Percy said he used to have a lab. Phil hasn’t had a job in 6 years which he says is immigrations fault. In A First Time For Everything he is shown to have a girlfriend.

Lomax is Kevin‘s favourite cousin who works as a police tow truck driver. He is Anastasia’s nephew. Kevin likes Lomax since he tells extremely morbid stories of accidents. It is unknown if ‘Lomax’ is his first or last name though you could say it is his last, as 'Lomax' is usually a last name.

Michael Jackson(voiced by Mike Wetmore)(being named after the famous singer and not to be confused with Kevin’s grandfathers brother, Uncle Mike) is another cousin of Kevin’s and Percy’s. He probably has one of the worst anger issues and is extremely competitive about it. He enjoys fighting(thought gets knocked out in a single punch) and offensive jokes of any kind, despite this he doesn’t spend his money on booze(due to his health problems and his responsibilities of taking care of his four stepsons). He first worked as a drug mule by the Mexican border, he was instantly attacked by border dogs. He tries to give Percy actual parenting advice, which Percy either ignored on insults, he may have died when Kevin stole his dialysis machine for money in Ward of the State as that is his final appearance.

"Slappy" Bigelow was consistently the top dog of 'Bendover County Prison's' black market and a secondary antagonist before being retconned after season 1. Due to Slappy’s superior strength Kevin get Pete to hospitalise him to take over the black market. In A Pillar Of Community the only information of Bigelow’s life was said by Slappy himself while a group of prisoners (Including Kevin and him) got to open up about their feelings to a therapist by the name of Elizabeth Armstrong, it went like this. Bigelow came from a neglectful background and his father was a workaholic, at 16 Bigelow then had enough with his family and robbed multiple gas stations being arrested sometime later. In the Great Canadian Shorts (those on Burly Bear Network, Mondo Media and Canal 33) 17 year old prisoner Matt Brower is Slappy Bigelow’s predecessor appearing in Juvenile Hall and Guidance Counsellor, both Slappy and Matt have similarities such as being called the new kid/prisoner in their debuts, often being violent towards Kevin and shown to be smokers (Slappy does not visually smoke but has a carton shoved up his sleeve.) In Juvenile Hall (also known as Six Month Sentence) Kevin goes searching for cigarettes after being out of cigarettes for a month, on this exact day Brower arrives and already is mentioned to show aggression to inmates, Matt smoked the same brand as Kevin so he asked him, instantly Matt told him to fuck off before punching him in the head, later that night Kevin would sneak into Matt’s room and set a fire and steal 20 dollars. In Guidance Counsellor, Mr Perry (the counsellor) asks Kevin what he wants to be, Kevin says he wants to be a Guidance Counsellor and sit on his ass all day acting like a moron, Perry then says that he needs an attitude adjustment and if he doesn’t he’ll spend his life on welfare like a loser, Kevin assumed he meant his dad so he punched Perry and was sent to Juvenile Hall where while read a true detective story and smoking, was beaten up by Matt and had is carton and 20 bucks (with an extra 10 stolen from Kevin.) Once Kevin left Juvenile he decided to give Perry ‘one holy ass whopping.’

Mrs. Kilbourn was Kevin’s teacher in season one. She was neglectful to her job and participated in strikes, she also often let students skip school and assumed Kevin’s actions to be on purpose rather than due to mental illness, compared to most adults in the show she does not have a addiction to sex or drugs, Percy has a severe dislike of going to her parent interviews due to the fact she asks him about Kevin's home life and tries to pry into it in front of many others one time Kevin got Percy to go telling him that the school was hosting a blood donation that will give him lots of money if he donates. She may have killed off in Public Offender when a carnival ride Kevin broke to make money fly out of pockets would fly into a swamp presumably killing her. Her employer and Principal of Kevin’s school is Principal/Mr Biggas often comically mispronounced as ‘Principal/Mr. Bigass’.

Wendy Amber-Mae is a local prostitute in season 1 and Kevin’s ex-wife. She debuts in Family Values as his counsellor’s girlfriend at a cheap summer camp, unlike her later appearances she in the flash back has a star tattoo instead of a heart tattoo, later in the summer camp flashback the counsellor cheats on her for another counsellor called Karen. Later in another flashback, after Kevin left juvenile detention he watched a pornographic film he stole from a video store he felt inspired to start a family(which he briefly thought that the booze was talking rather than a choice of his own. Soon enough he’d steal a car and some cash and pick up a prostitute(which was Wendy), he then quickly decided to get married in Mexico, on the 13th day of July 2000 they were married at Juanita’s House of Burritos. The next day she ask Kevin if she could go to the beach with him and get tequila Kevin pretended to be asleep since he was not willing to share any more money so she left, it is mentioned by Pete Wilcox (which he was following Kevin at the time)that when she left she offered him some cigarettes. Wendy is later seen around the rest of season 1.

In the final episode, it is revealed that the entire series is actually just a delusion created by Allen himself. Further, Allen has been seeking therapy to become sane again by speaking to the goose version of Dr. Franklin.

== The Great Canadian Shorts ==
The Great Canadian Shorts: Kevin Spencer (subtitled "Crime is Fun" for Burly Bear Network airings) is a 1998 animated black comedy by Greg Lawrence which aired on The Burly Bear Network. Just like its successor, it is about a 16 year old juvenile addicted to cough syrup, alcohol and cigarettes. In 2001 it was remastered and put on the platforms Canal 33 and Mondo Media. The rights of the shorts were briefly owned by Saturday Night Live during 1998-1999 for the 24th season.

The Great Canadian Shorts: Kevin Spencer
- Genre: Black Comedy; Adult Animation; Sitcom
- Created by: Greg Lawrence
- Written by: Greg Lawrence
- Directed by: David Bigelow
- Narrated by: Greg Lawrence
- Music by: Serge Côté; Howard Sonneburg(Audio mix)
- Country of origin: Canada
- No. of episodes: 13

Production
- Producer: Greg Lawrence
- Animators: Helen Dardik; Frank Burelle; Liette Bettez; Lily Warren
- Editor: David Bigelow
- Running time: 2 minutes
- Production companies: Ocnus Productions; Atomic Productions

Original release
- Network: Burly Bear Network
- Release: 1998 – 2002

Episode Number	Episodes	Plot Summary
1	Birthday	Kevin's seventh birthday is coming up and he desperately wants a dog. This is a remaster of Greg's 1997 short film The Real And True Adventure Of Kevin Spencer Prior To His Incarnation, which was Kevin original debut. This episode was never remade.
2	A New Bike	Kevin(at the age of nine), while off school early since he goes to a special education school watches the other kids go to school, he especially kept his eyes on Jimmy Thompson who had his new mountain bike with him, Kevin gets jealous and immediately wants one. This is the debut of Jimmy Thompson who appears throughout season one in the CTV series.
3	Swimming Lessons	At the age of ten the doctors tell Kevin and his parents to get him into sport to rehabilitate him, his parents take him swimming since its cheap and there he meets a boy called Michael(which he dislikes).
4	Juvenile Hall(Six Month Sentence)	Kevin beats up his neighbor while on cough syrup, he then get arrested for his first time and goes to prison, since all the kids were bigger than him he would smack a kid in the throat with a lunch tray and then gets into a fight with the guards before being sent to solitary confinement, where he would run out of cigarettes which he spent most of his sentence, his sentence then gets shortened by a liberal social worker who thought it was cruel. After being released from confinement he asks a new kid called Matt Brower for cigarettes. Matt Brower is the spiritual predecessor to Slappy Bigelow.
5	Guidance Consellor	Kevin has to go to Mr. Perry's office and tries not to hit him up since if he goes back to prison he will get beaten up by Matt Brower.
6	Public Speaking	It is Kevin's first day of grade 7 and gets scared of public speaking so he curses at Mr Wills and punched a classmate, he is sent to Principal Robert Mince where he brakes his car after he gets lectured by Mince. In gym class Jimmy Thompson makes fun of Kevin before he gets punched by him, Kevin gets lectured by the gym teacher which Kevin hits him again. Mince then calls Percy about it.
7	Drama Class	To graduate grade 8 Kevin needs to take a drama class, the teacher thought it was a great idea to give him the role of Romeo so he can discover a talent, Martha Jarvis got Juilet, this angered Steven Brown who wanted the main role and to kiss Martha.
8	Carnival	Kevin gets grounded while the carnival is in town, he decides to go anyway though.
9	First Day	Kevin just started grade 9 and is scared, he skips the first three lessons and gets made fun of in the cafeteria, which makes him want to get revenge.
10	The/A Hooker	When Kevin turned 15, Percy bought him a hooker called Misty to make sure he doesn't turn gay.
11	Driving Lessons/Test	Kevin just turned 16 and has to take a driving lesson with Mr. McNally in a 1987 Buick Skylark.
12	Hits The Road	Kevin throws a chair out the window and leaves Mr. Wills class to go to Las Vegas after stealing Janitor Custodian's car, on the way he sees a pretty girl.
13	School Dance	Kevin asks his Anastasia to teach him how to dance since the school dance is coming up, she tells him to get her a drink. In the middle of the night she forces Kevin to get up and dance to Percy's Mötorhead album, Percy wakes up after being drunk at tells Kevin that dancing is for queers, Ana then wacks him in the head with a empty bottle of gin. During the school dance he would pass out after taking to many deep breaths before trying to ask his childhood crush Francine Mueller for a dance.

== Streaming ==
Ocnus Productions (creators of Kevin Spencer) sold the rights to the shows around May/June 2011 to Netflix. The seasons were therefore removed from Expressmedia.ca where Manufacture-On-Demand DVDs had been available for sale for several years. All 8 seasons were made available in the US on Netflix's streaming service July 15, 2011. However, as of December 2011, the show failed to appear on Netflix's Canadian version of the streaming service. On July 17, 2012, Netflix stopped featuring it altogether. Seasons 1-2 were later added on to Hulu the same year. All 8 seasons of the show are currently available on The Roku Channel, Plex, Tubi, and YouTube.

== See also ==
- South Park, a show it has often been called a Canadian version of
- Chilly Beach, another "Canadian South Park"
- Beavis and Butt-Head, another show about juvenile delinquents
- Odd Job Jack, another Comedy Network original
- Butch Patterson: Private Dick, another show by Greg Lawrence
- Trailer Park Boys
- Freddy Got Fingered
- Happy Tree Friends
