= Ecstasy (Jody Watley song) =

Single by Jody Watley

from the album Intimacy
- Released: 1994
- Recorded: February 17, 1994
- Genre: House
- Label: MCA
- Songwriter(s): Jody Watley, David Morales, Terry Burrus
- Producer(s): David Morales

Jody Watley singles chronology
"When a Man Loves a Woman" (1993)	"Ecstasy" (1994)	"Affection" (1995)

"Ecstasy" is a house song by singer, Jody Watley. It was written by Watley, David Morales and Terry Burrus and produced by Morales (who'd worked with Watley previously on her hit single, "I'm the One You Need"). It first appeared on the 1993 album, Intimacy.

== History ==
Released as a promotional single to dance clubs and DJs in 1994, a Bad Yard Club remix of "Ecstasy" (by David Morales) appeared on the U.K. CD-single of "When a Man Loves a Woman"; this version would later appear on Watley's 1996 Greatest Hits compilation. Also, "Ecstasy" was included on a two-track Victor Japanese 3-inch CD single along with the Goro Inagaki song, "If You Give Your Heart".

== Charts ==
Chart (1994)	Peak positions
UK Club Chart (Music Week)	66
