= Steve Lookner =

American writer, producer, and news anchor (born 1971)

- Born: Stephen Lookner; April 14, 1971 (age 55)
- Education: Harvard University (BA); Tufts University (MA); University of California, Los Angeles (MA)
- Occupations: Television writer; Producer; News anchor

YouTube information
- Channel: Agenda-Free TV
- Years active: 2017–present
- Genre: Current events
- Subscribers: 957,000
- Views: 208 million
- Last updated: July 23, 2026

Stephen Lookner (born April 14, 1971) is an American television writer, producer, and news anchor. He is known for his work as a comedy writer for several shows during the 1990s and early 2000s. He currently serves as the lead anchor for the online news program Agenda-Free TV.

== Early life and education ==
Lookner was born on April 14, 1971. (Note: Steve Lookner did YouTube livestreams on his birthday on April 14, 2021, and April 14, 2022. A USA Today article published on May 20, 1993, said he was 22. An Entertainment Weekly article published on June 28, 2002, said he was 31. The combination of these sources verifies that Lookner was born on April 14, 1971.) Lookner attended Harvard University, where he wrote for The Harvard Lampoon, a student humor publication known for producing writers who later worked in American television and film. He later earned a master's degree from Tufts University and an additional master's degree from the University of California, Los Angeles.

== Television writing and production ==
After graduating from Harvard, Lookner pursued a career in television comedy writing. He worked as a writer for the NBC sketch comedy series Saturday Night Live and the sitcom Seinfeld during the 1990s.

In 2001, Lookner collaborated with television writer David Mandel on Dave and Steve's Video Game Explosion, a video game–themed comedy program developed for the Burly Bear Network. The series was overseen by producer Lorne Michaels and aired for twelve episodes before the network was sold and the program ended.

Lookner later served as a co-executive producer on the Comedy Central series Mind of Mencia, which starred comedian Carlos Mencia and ran from 2005 to 2008.

== Digital media and journalism ==
In 2017, Lookner wrote for Right Side Broadcasting Network, a digital media outlet that livestreams political events and rallies.

Later that year, Lookner launched Agenda-Free TV, an independent online news program streamed primarily on YouTube. The program focuses on live coverage of breaking news and current events, with Lookner serving as its primary host and anchor.

Coverage of YouTube-based news livestreaming has cited Agenda-Free TV as an example of independent digital journalism operating outside traditional cable and broadcast news models.

As of 2025, Agenda-Free TV has accumulated hundreds of thousands of subscribers and more than one hundred million total views.
