= Living sculpture =

Type of sculpture

Living sculpture is any type of sculpture that is created with living, growing grasses, vines, plants or trees. It can be functional and/or ornamental. There are several different types of living sculpture techniques, including topiary (prune plants or train them over frames), sod works (create sculptures using soil and grass or moss), tree shaping (growing designs with living trees) and mowing and crop art (create patterns or pictures with plants or in lawns). Most living sculpture technique requires horticultural skills, such as grafting or pruning, to create the art.

== History ==
Sculptors through the ages have traditionally worked with non-living media such as clay, plaster, glass, bronze, or even plastic. Although sculpting plants isn’t a new idea (bonsai or topiary have long historical traditions), its recent rediscovery by artists, horticulturalists, gardeners, and young people has given living sculpture an innovative popularity.

Living sculptures blend art and science. It’s a process that gives the sculptor a chance to bring their vision to life. Creating a living sculpture is also a collaborative process that can bring artistic minds, logistical minds, and scientific minds together. As a team project, creating a living sculpture can be about more than just art or science. A team collaborating to design and build a living sculpture can learn a lot about themselves, each other, and what partnerships are all about - while making a functional and/or ornamental public sculpture in their community.

== Topiary ==
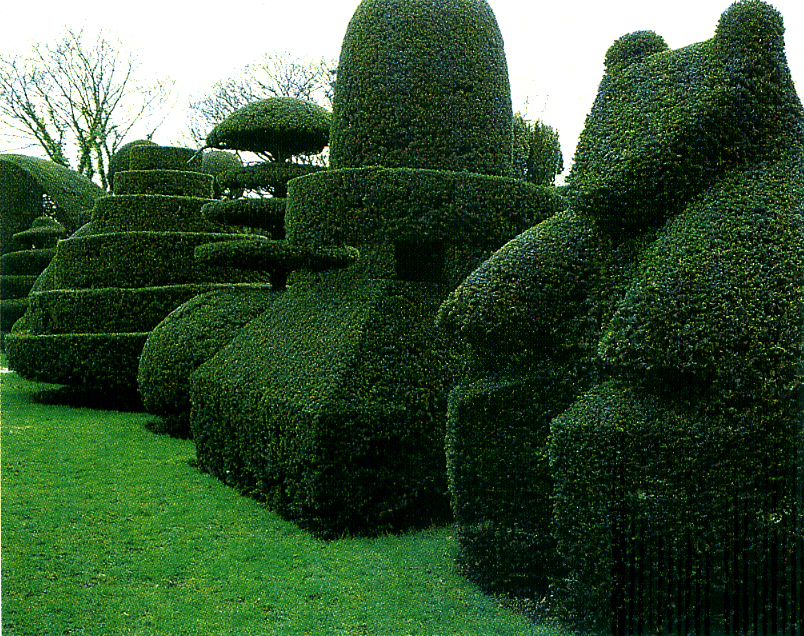
Beckley Park, Oxfordshire: cottage garden topiary formulas taken up for an early 20th-century elite English garden in a historic house setting

One of the older and more familiar kinds of living sculpture, topiary is the art of growing dense, leafy plants and pruning them into a form, or training them over a frame, to create a three-dimensional object. It relies on pruning and training to give shape to an existing plant. It also can involve training a plant to fill in a form.

Topiary is one type of living sculpture that has gone in and out of favor through the ages. A few historical highlights of its importance and use:

- Earliest references of topiary date back to 23-79 A.D.
- It was immensely popular in Ancient Rome using cypress trees, but after the fall of Rome, topiary fell out of favor for several hundred years.
- It returned in medieval times as a way of training fruit plants, and then was again rediscovered during the Italian Renaissance.
- The Dutch in the 15th century became intrigued with creating topiary in animal shapes, as did 17th century England; the French preferred creating topiary in geometric designs with strict symmetry.
- 18th century, topiary fell out of favor again, and a natural look returned.
- Victorians brought back topiary, adding in new plants and details.
- Topiary spread to North America at Williamsburg, Virginia, around 1690.
- As houseplants became popular in the 1950s and 1960s, topiary moved indoors.

== Turf and sodworks ==
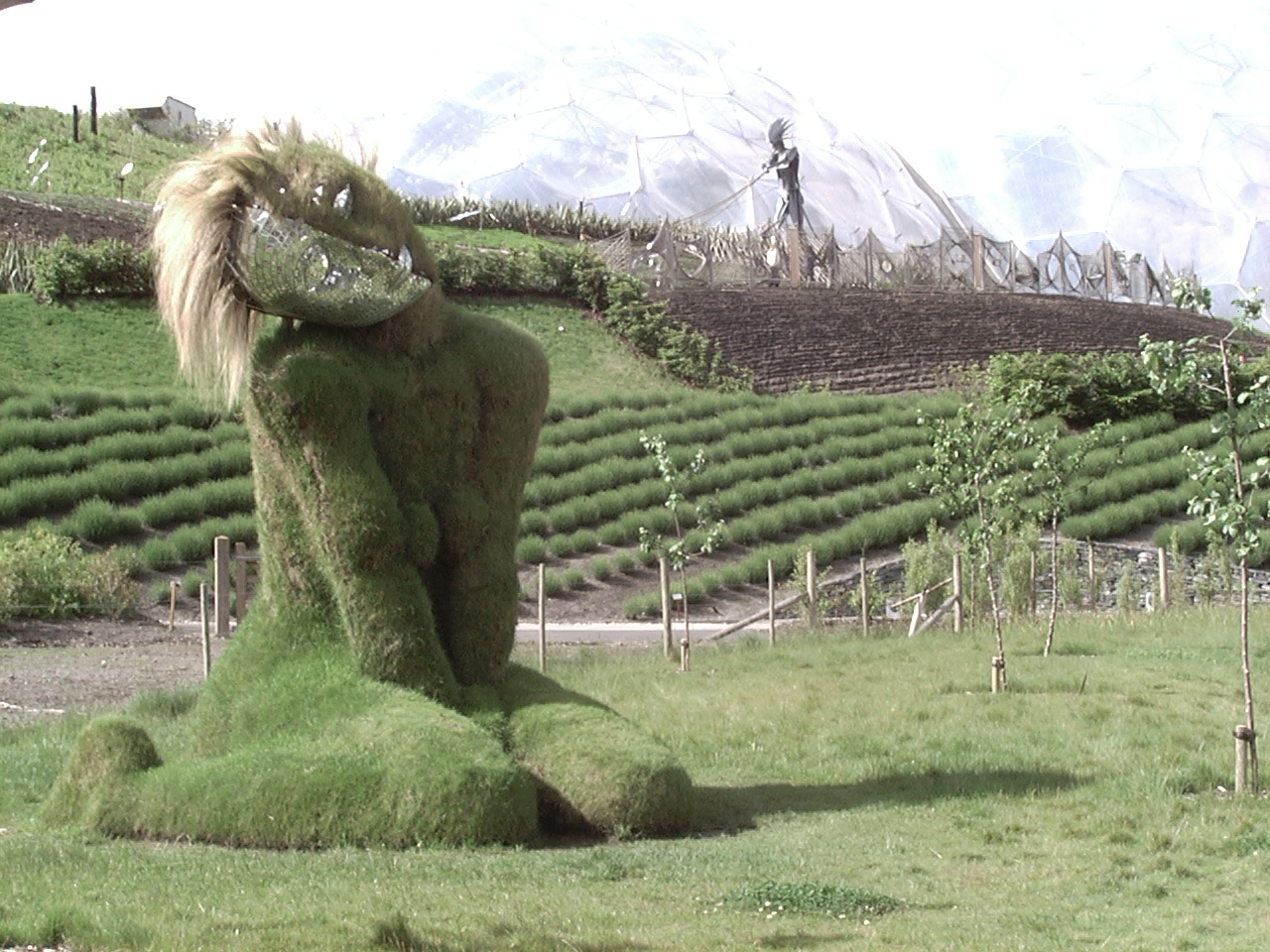
Grasswoman sculpture at Eden Project

Turf- or sod-works are created from grass or moss and soil. This type of art has roots in the Land Art movement (also known as the Earthworks or Earth Art movement) that emerged in the late 1960s and early 1970s. During this period, landscape and the work of art began to be viewed as linked. Sculptures were not just placed in the landscape; rather the landscape became the very means of their creation. These works often existed in the open, located well away from communities, and were left to change under natural conditions. Many of the first works were created in the deserts of Nevada, Utah, New Mexico, and Arizona. They did not, or were not meant to last, and now exist only as recordings or photos.

Works made from the earth are changing the way in which people view art, and often are used to promote environmental awareness. These works may be created on waste sites, and may draw attention to land reclamation and urban restoration efforts. Recent earth artists have worked with soil, sod, or moss to create forms that may be intimate and small, or large and multi-acre. They may be cut out of the earth, or formed with soil. They may give a nod to the past, or they may be cutting edge and contemporary in design. Some examples include labyrinths and mazes, animal and human forms, geometric shapes, and furniture.

== Espalier ==
Espalier is the art and horticultural practice of training tree branches onto ornamental shapes along a frame for ascetic and fruit production by grafting, shaping and pruning the branches so that they grow flat, frequently in formal patterns, against a structure such as a wall, fence, or trellis. The practice is commonly used to accelerate and increase production in fruit-bearing trees and also to decorate flat exterior walls while conserving space.

== Pleaching ==
Pleaching is a technique of weaving the branches of trees into a hedge commonly, deciduous trees are planted in lines, then pleached to form a flat plane on clear stems above the ground level. Branches are woven together and lightly tied. Branches in close contact may grow together, due to a natural phenomenon called inosculation, a natural graft. Pleach also means weaving of thin, whippy stems of trees to form a basketry affect.

== Bonsai ==
Bonsai is the art of aesthetic miniaturization of trees, or of developing woody or semi-woody plants shaped as trees, by growing them in containers. Cultivation includes techniques for shaping, watering, and repotting in various styles of containers.

== Tree shaping ==
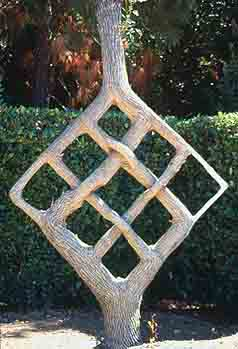
Needle & Thread Tree by Axel Erlandson

Tree shaping uses living trees as a medium to create structures and art for example, chairs, ladders, mirrors and people trees. There are a few different methods to create shaped trees, which share a common heritage with other artistic horticultural and agricultural practices, such as pleaching, bonsai, espalier, and topiary, and using some of the similar techniques.

Tree shaping has been practiced for at least several hundred years, as demonstrated by the living root bridges built and maintained by the Khasi people of India.

== Creative Mowing and Crop Art ==
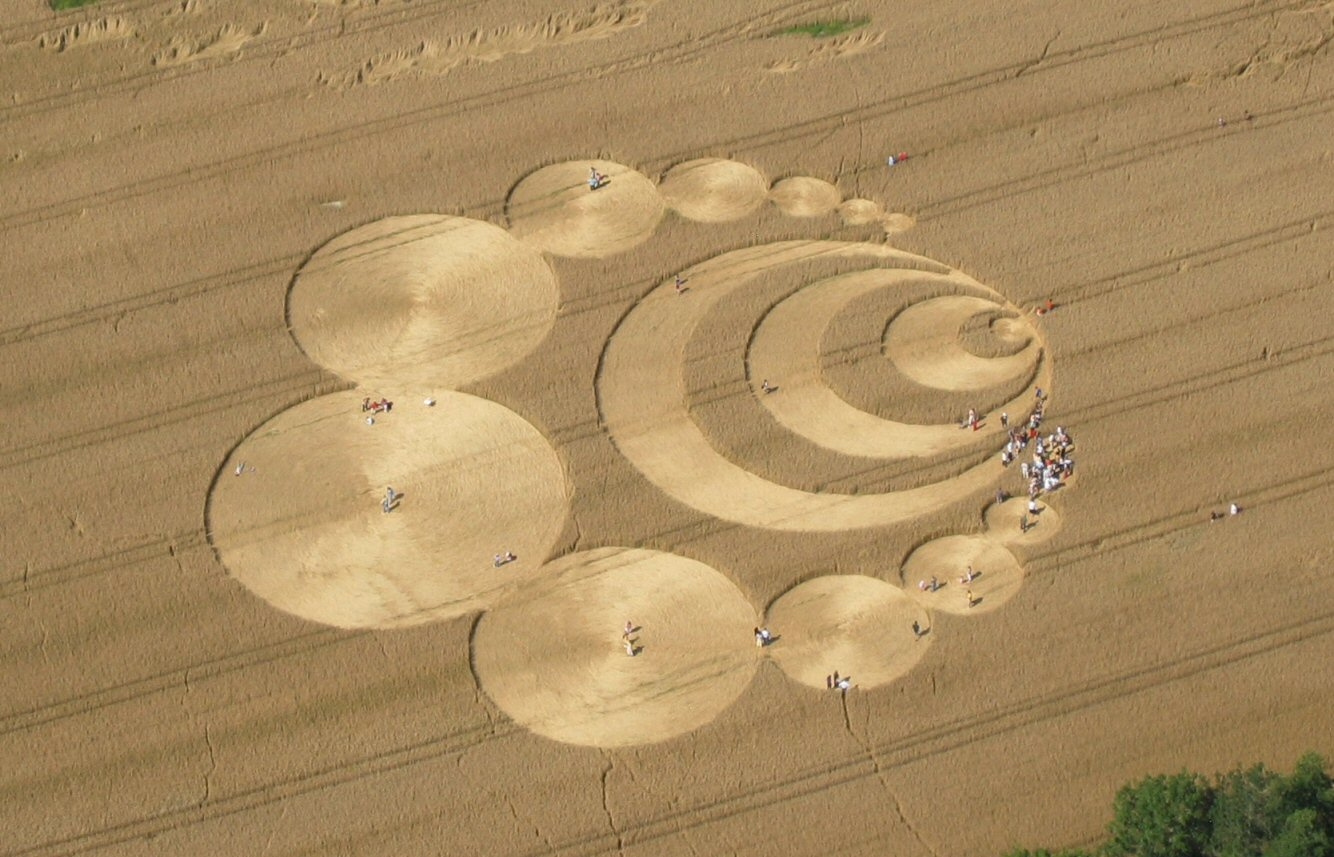
A crop circle in Switzerland

Crop circles are created by crop artists in advance on paper, who often work with farmers, special equipment, and a diversity of crops to create multi-acre masterpieces that are viewed from the air and are captured via photographs. They draw on a variety of impressionist, surrealist, and modernist roots in their designs, and some are thought of by some as quirky.

== See also ==
- Gilroy Gardens
- Baubotanik
