= Dave and Steve's Video Game Explosion =

US television program

- Genre: Comedy
- Created by: Ted Jessup; Steve Lookner; David Mandel
- Starring: Steve Lookner; David Mandel
- Country of origin: United States
- Original language: English
- No. of episodes: 12 (Including 1 hour long special and 2 that never aired)

Production
- Executive producers: Ted Jessup; Steve Lookner; David Mandel
- Running time: 22 minutes 45 minutes (special 7th episode)

Original release
- Network: Burly Bear Network
- Release: November 2001

Dave and Steve's Video Game Explosion is an American comedy video game review television series. In November 2001, it began airing on TBS as well as the Burly Bear TV network and later was part of a one-hour time slot. Dave & Steve were listed on Entertainment Weekly's It List in 2002.

The comedy-based variety show was hosted by two accomplished comedy writers, David Mandel (Cat in the Hat, Eurotrip, Seinfeld and Saturday Night Live) and Steve Lookner (Seinfeld and Saturday Night Live). VGE was produced by Jack Helmuth and Shawn Valine. The main writers were Craig Digregorio (Da Ali G Show) and James Eagan.

Between game reviews the hosts often mocked their sponsor, SoBe, or abused their cheerleader Tiffany Holiday.

The show was produced by the Burly Bear Network (also known as Burly TV), a college television network headed by Lorne Michaels.
