= Grimm Job =

- Family Guy episode
- Episode no.: Season 12; Episode 10
- Directed by: Joe Vaux
- Written by: Alec Sulkin
- Production code: BACX09
- Original air date: January 12, 2014

Guest appearances
- Brad Goreski as Gay Man No. 1; Emily Osment as Little Miss Muffet; Ann Wilson as herself; Nancy Wilson as herself

Episode chronology
| ← Previous "Peter Problems" | Next → "Brian's a Bad Father" |
- Family Guy season 12

"Grimm Job" is the tenth episode of the twelfth season of the animated comedy series Family Guy and the 220th episode overall. It originally aired on Fox in the United States on January 12, 2014, and was directed by Joe Vaux and written by Alec Sulkin.

In the episode, Peter reads Stewie three fairy tales: Jack and the Beanstalk, Little Red Riding Hood and Cinderella.

== Plot ==
When Lois sends Peter in to check on Stewie who is having trouble sleeping, he sits down to read Stewie some fairy tales.

=== Jack and the Beanstalk ===
Jack (played by Peter) is sent out by his wife (played by Lois) to sell their cow (played by Brian) for money to buy food. Despite her warnings not to buy magic beans, he crosses paths with a troll (played by Mort) who trades him magic beans for the cow. Jack recruits the band Heart to explain to his wife why he accepted the beans (by singing "These Dreams", but replacing "dreams" with "beans"), but his wife is displeased (even though Jack said if he buys some, it's her fault for mentioning them) and throws them outside, and demands that Jack get a real job. That night, the beans grow into a giant beanstalk. Jack decides to climb it and discovers a castle in the clouds. There, he finds The Goose That Lays the Golden Eggs (played by Stewie), but wakes up the Giant (played by Chris), and ignorantly makes him follow him. Jack flees down the beanstalk where Rumpelforeskin (played by Quagmire) is sawing it down for blocking his view of Little Miss Muffet's tuffet (he needs to see her tuffet to "make curds and whey"), though he couldn't get help from the off-screen Little Boy Brown (played by Cleveland) since he can't find his gloves. Jack reaches the ground and the beanstalk falls, killing the giant. With the goose in their possession, their financial troubles are solved, but their sexual troubles are still very much a problem.

=== Little Red Riding Hood ===
Little Red Riding Hood (played by Stewie) is given a basket of food from her mother (played by Lois) to take to Grandma (played by Barbara Pewterschmidt) and, after complaining about why Grandma would need a 'Coors Party Ball', sets out through the forest. After a brief encounter with a laking tree which calls him out for acting gay, "she" runs into the Big Bad Wolf (played by Brian). Red and the Wolf discuss the “Three Little Pigs” while heading towards Grandma's house. At Grandma's house, Little Red Riding Hood's grandfather (played by Carter Pewterschmidt) heads out to the Old Woman in the Shoe's house to get the Old Woman (played by Consuela) to tidy up in there or he will rent her house to Goldilocks and the Three Bears (the three bears are actually depicted as three gay men). The Wolf gets there first and, by pretending to be Red, tricks Grandma into letting him into the house and eating her. After starting to go through the charade that the Wolf is Grandma, Red can no longer keep it up and the Wolf admits who he really is. The Wolf wonders why Red is upset when he is aware that he is about to be slaughtered by the woodsman, at which point the woodsman (played by Peter) bursts through the door and violently bisects the Wolf with a chainsaw, splattering blood all over the wall and leaving the remains of the wolf and Grandma in a bloody mess on the floor. The woodsman is subsequently revealed to be a lunatic who goes from house to house murdering people with his chainsaw, after screams are heard implying that he has murdered another victim off-screen.

=== Cinderella ===
In the same storyline as the Disney film, Cinderella (played by Lois) is forced to work for her mean stepsisters (played by Meg and Stewie, the latter due to them having "so few female characters to work with") when a message arrives with an invitation to a ball by Prince Charming (played by Peter). Cinderella arrives, ready to go to the ball with her stepfamily, but her stepsisters tear the dress at the urging of her stepmother (played by Barbara Pewterschmidt). Her fairy godmother (played by Mayor West) arrives and grants her a new dress and carriage (made from the medieval version of Joe Swanson) to go to the ball as well as turning the dog (played by Brian) into a horse to pull the carriage. At the ball, Prince Charming meets the evil stepsisters and rejects their advances but falls for Cinderella. After they dance and start to kiss, the clock strikes midnight and Cinderella is forced to flee losing her glass slipper on the way out. The next day, Prince Charming orders the Captain of the Guards (played by Seamus) to send out his men to search for the girl whose foot will fit the slipper. After failed attempts at the houses of different women (two of which were played by Angela and Tricia Takanawa), Prince Charming arrive at Cinderella's house. Before Prince Charming can try the glass slipper on the stepsisters, he meets Cinderella as his dream girl and they were married until they separated seven months later to renew their relationship.

=== Finale ===
Stewie falls asleep as Peter tucks him in and says goodnight to him. Peter also says goodnight to Chris (unaware that Herbert is in his room) and goodnight to Meg (unaware that she has hanged herself).

== Reception ==
Eric Thurm of The A.V. Club gave the episode a C−, saying ""Grimm Job” has just enough time to run through the basic beats of each story, doing the most superficial possible version of a Family Guy fairy tale. Not only does that reduce the quality of many of the jokes, it also reduces the room in the episode for cutaways (I counted only two), which sure are random but are also often an opportunity for the writers to shove in random stuff they think is funny. Without cutaways, Family Guy just has to rely on the story, which has never really been its strong suit." He also noted that the Stewie and Brian (Red Riding Hood) segment was "the funniest of the night."

The episode received a 2.7 rating and was watched by a total of 5.22 million people. This made it the most watched show on Animation Domination that night, beating American Dad!, Bob's Burgers and The Simpsons.
