= Intimate =

Intimate may refer to:

- Intimate examination, a physical examination for medical purposes that includes examination of the breasts, genitalia, or rectum of a patient
- Intimate ion pair, the interactions between a cation, anion and surrounding solvent molecules
- Intimate media, media artifacts created and collected to capture and commemorate aspects of family and intimate relationships
- Intimate part, a place on the human body which it is usually customary to keep covered with clothing in public areas
- Intimate relationship, a particularly close interpersonal relationship
- Intimate second-person pronouns in languages with a T–V distinction.

== Music ==
- Intimate (Shizuka Kudo album)
- Intimate (Toni Pearen album), or the title track
- Intimate (Smokey Robinson album), or the title track
- "Intimate", a 2018 song by Yungen featuring Craig David

== See also ==
- Intimacy (disambiguation)
