= Affection (Jody Watley album) =

Studio album by Jody Watley
- Released: July 11, 1995
- Recorded: 1994–1995
- Genre: R&B, pop, soul, jazz
- Length: 42:16
- Label: Avitone / Bellmark-Life
- Producer: Derrick Edmondson, Jody Watley

Jody Watley chronology
Remixes of Love (1994)	Affection (1995)	Greatest Hits (1996)

Professional ratings
Review scores
Source	Rating
AllMusic	3/5 stars
Entertainment Weekly	C+
People	(positive)

Affection is the fifth album by the American pop singer Jody Watley, released in 1995.

== Track listing ==
No.	Title	Writer(s)	Length
1.	"The Beat Don't Stop"	Derrick Edmondson; Glenn McKinney; Watley	4:44
2.	"Affection"	Edmondson; Watley	4:36
3.	"(We Gotta Be) Together"	Larry "Rock" Campbell; Watley	4:42
4.	"Way, Pts. 1 & 2"	Edmonson; Rodney Lee; Stan Sargeant; Watley	10:17
5.	"Pride and Joy"	Campbell	5:29
6.	"All Night Love Affair"	Edmonson; Watley	5:47
7.	"Stay"	Keith Crouch; Edmonson; Lee; Watley	6:07
8.	"Faithful"	Edmonson; Watley	5:22
9.	"I Care for You"	Edmonson; Watley	3:51
10.	"Lookin' for a New Love" (Recorded Live at Osaka Blue Note 1994)	André Cymone; Watley	4:55
Total length:			42:16

== Personnel ==
- Jody Watley – vocals, background vocals
- Yvette Cason – backing vocals
- Keith Crouch – drums, Moog synthesizer, Moog bass
- Kenneth Crouch – strings
- Angelo Earl – acoustic guitar, electric guitar
- Derrick Edmonson – keyboards, saxophone
- Lili Haydn – violin
- David Jackson – accordion
- Rodney Lee – keyboards, Fender Rhodes
- Glenn McKinney – guitar, keyboards
- Morris O'Connor – acoustic guitar, guitar
- Tory Ruffin – guitar
- Stan Sargeant – bass guitar, electric bass
- Dwight Sills – acoustic guitar
- Brannen Temple – drums

Production

- Producers – Derrick Edmonson, Jody Watley
- Executive producer – Jody Watley
- Engineers – Angelo Earl, Booker T. Jones, Chris Welton
- Assistant engineer – Gene Lo
- Mixing – Angelo Earl, Booker T. Jones, Chris Welton
- Mixing assistant – Gene Lo
- Mastering –: Steve Hall
- Guitar programming – Derrick Edmonson
- Instrumentation – Derrick Edmonson
- Arrangers – Derrick Edmonson, Jody Watley
- String arrangements – Kenneth Crouch
- Art direction – Simon Halfon, Jody Watley
- Photography – Michael Walls

== Charts ==
=== Weekly charts ===
Chart (1995)	Peak position
Japanese Albums (Oricon)	69
US Top R&B/Hip-Hop Albums (Billboard)	59

=== Singles ===
Year	Single	Chart	Peak position
1995	"Affection"	Hot R&B/Hip-Hop Singles	28
