= Brian's a Bad Father =

- Family Guy episode
- Episode no.: Season 12; Episode 11
- Directed by: Jerry Langford
- Written by: Chris Sheridan
- Production code: BACX10
- Original air date: January 26, 2014

Guest appearances
- Ashley Benson as Dakota; Jim Breuer as Joe Pesci; Lucas Grabeel as Cameron; Liam Neeson as himself; Emily Osment as Cheyenne; Kevin Michael Richardson as Marvin Gaye

Episode chronology
← Previous "Grimm Job"	Next → "Mom's the Word"
- Family Guy season 12

"Brian's a Bad Father" is the eleventh episode of the twelfth season of the animated comedy series Family Guy and the 221st episode overall. It aired on Fox in the United States on January 26, 2014, and is directed by Jerry Langford and written by Chris Sheridan.

In the episode, Brian's human son, Dylan, returns, now a teen TV star. Rather than being a good father to his estranged son, Brian uses his son's television connections to further his own writing career. Meanwhile, after Peter shoots Quagmire on a hunting trip, the two friends clash and Joe must choose a side. The episode received mostly negative reviews from critics.

== Plot ==
Brian's overlooked and neglected teenage son Dylan returns to Quahog. While Dylan tries to reconnect with his father, Brian tries to distance himself from him due to seeing no benefit for reconnecting. However, when he learns that Dylan is a now a cast member in a new Disney Channel television series, he — under the ruse of bonding — uses Dylan's connections to secure a job on the series' writing staff to further his career prospects. However, Brian is fired by the network for trying to adapt the writing to include TV-MA content rather than adhering to age-appropriate guidelines. Furthermore, a disillusioned Dylan, realizing that Brian is merely using him for his own selfish ambitions rather than fatherly bonding, refuses to see him again. A depressed Brian realizes how selfish he has been and how he ruined his chance to have Dylan back in his life. Stewie decides to help him apologize to Dylan. On the first try, Brian gets beaten up after trying to sneak past security, since he is banned from the studio. However, as they are about to leave, Stewie sees a casting line and successfully tries out for Dylan's show under one of his aliases. While recording, Stewie breaks character and explains to Dylan that Brian wants to apologize to him and become a true father to him. Dylan meets up with Brian at the local park and forgives him.

Meanwhile, Peter, Quagmire and Joe go on a hunting trip. During a lunch break, Peter deliberately shoots Quagmire in his arm when trying to show him how it would be if the safety was off. When the three friends meet back at the bar, Quagmire tells Peter he is fed up with his shortsighted and reckless behavior and ends their friendship. This causes a rift between the two as they compete for Joe's affection. Joe chooses Quagmire because he has helped him more through hard times and gets along better with his family. Feeling abandoned by his friends, Peter decides to commit suicide, which Lois talks him out of and persuades him to try and reconcile with Quagmire. Later, Peter offers Quagmire the opportunity to shoot him to break even, thinking Quagmire would decline and consider the "thought" as being what counts. However, when Quagmire actually agrees, the two wrestle for the gun until Joe shoots Peter in the arm as an attempt to stop the dispute. While Peter debates how to settle their differences, Quagmire takes his opportunity to shoot him in the head, making the score even. A brain-damaged and wheelchair-using Peter is happy that he, Quagmire and Joe are friends again.

== Reception ==
Eric Thurm of The A.V. Club gave the episode a C−, saying "When so much of the episode is based on moving Brian from one end of the parenting spectrum to the other, that story has to be compelling, especially without that many jokes. But because it's hard to buy Brian at the beginning, it's difficult to watch this episode or take it that seriously (or as seriously as you'd ever take an episode of Family Guy)."

The episode received a 2.0 rating in the 18- to 49-year-old demographic and was watched by a total of 4.11 million people. This made it the most watched show on Animation Domination that night, beating American Dad!, Bob's Burgers and The Simpsons. Including DVR viewing, the episode was watched by 5.83 million viewers, and received an 18-49 rating of 3.0.
