= Ted Jessup =

American television personality

- Occupations: Writer, actor, producer

Theodore Carrington Jessup is an American television writer, producer, actor, and performer. He was a writer for the Fox animated sitcom Family Guy, and has written the episodes "12 and a Half Angry Men," "Mom's the Word," "The 2000-Year-Old Virgin," "Brokeback Swanson," and "High School English” among others.

== Early life and education ==
He graduated from Hamilton College.

== Production ==
Jessup has been a producer and writer for National Geographic Television, Comedy Central, Nickelodeon, The Late Late Show (CBS TV) with Craig Kilborn, Seth MacFarlane, VH1, MTV and The Al Franken Show among others.

Jessup has written comedy for numerous award-winning shows including The Peoples Choice, Guys Choice and Video Game Awards. He co-created the cult favorites VH1's Rock Candy and Dave and Steve's Video Game Explosion. He was also an executive producer and head writer for Nickelodeon's Space Cases.

Jessup was the executive producer and head of programming for Lorne Michaels's experimental, youth-targeted Burly Bear Network. He also executive produced the critically acclaimed feature film, Throwing Down, which won best American film at the 1995 Hamptons’ Film Festival. Jessup also won a CableACE Award for directing The Other Europe for the Travel Channel, starring Billy Kimball.

== Performance ==
As a performer Jessup appeared as himself in The Real Roseanne Show. He has appeared in numerous sketches on The Late Late Show. He played a talkative “john” opposite porn star Sasha Grey in Steven Soderbergh’s The Girlfriend Experience. He appears regularly as a commentator on TruTV's World's Dumbest.... He is a regular contributor and one of the original editors of The Old Yorker, the Internet humor journal.

== Ancestors ==
Jessup is a direct descendant of the puritan John Jessup, a founder of Southampton, Long Island, and also of Henry Harris Jessup, the missionary and co-founder of the American University of Beirut. He is a nephew of Philip Jessup the noted diplomat, jurist and scholar. Jessup resides in Los Angeles and New York City.
