= Mom's the Word =

- Family Guy episode
- Episode no.: Season 12; Episode 12
- Directed by: John Holmquist
- Written by: Ted Jessup
- Production code: BACX11
- Original air date: March 9, 2014

Guest appearances
- Lauren Bacall as Evelyn; Carrie Fisher as Angela; Ariana Grande as Italian Daughter

Episode chronology
← Previous "Brian's a Bad Father"	Next → "3 Acts of God"
- Family Guy season 12

"Mom's the Word" is the twelfth episode of the twelfth season of the animated comedy series Family Guy and the 222nd episode overall. It aired on Fox in the United States on March 9, 2014, and is directed by John Holmquist and written by Ted Jessup. In the episode Peter's mother, Thelma Griffin, dies of a stroke. After the funeral, Thelma's friend Evelyn arrives to support Peter, but ends up kissing him. The episode marked Lauren Bacall's final television role.

== Plot ==
Lois sees Peter eating an entire tube of raw cookie dough (which Peter thought was a sausage with raisins). During a meeting at the Pawtucket Brewery, Peter feels unwell as a result of eating the raw cookie dough and a taco he found in the parking lot, and he soils himself trying to get to the restroom while evading various people. Depressed and exhausted following that incident, Peter comes home from work to find his friends and family gathered in the living room. Though he at first believes that the incident at work had leaked out to Quahog, Lois tells him that they did not find out about the incident and explains that his mother, Thelma, has died of a stroke.

After the service, Thelma's closest friend, Evelyn, approaches Peter, and the two connect after she tells him about her husband, Walter, dying some time ago. The two begin spending much time together and Peter begins seeing her as a surrogate mother, which disturbs his family and friends. One night, Evelyn attempts to seduce Peter by kissing him. When he confronts her the next day, Evelyn claims that her medicine made her act in an uncharacteristic way. After spending more time with her, Peter realizes she was lying as she continues making advances towards him and immediately ends their friendship. The next day, he visits his mother's grave, where he sees Evelyn, who apologizes to Peter and explains that she had taken advantage of him since he was the first man to pay any real attention since her husband died. Upon hearing this, Peter also admits to being partly at fault, due to missing his mother so much, he had looked to Evelyn as a replacement. Peter and Evelyn reconcile, but while they hug, Peter accidentally cracks Evelyn's spine, killing her. Not wanting to be arrested over her death, he places Evelyn on a nearby bench and immediately leaves her for the groundskeeper to handle.

Meanwhile, Stewie develops a fear of death after Brian explains to him at Thelma's funeral that everyone is going to die at some point, including Stewie himself. Brian attempts to console him by seeking out several religions and showing their beliefs on the afterlife like visiting a Jewish synagogue, the Quahog Buddhists Temple, and a Catholic church. Stewie is unsatisfied and asks Brian what he believes happens after death. Brian, despite the fact he went to Heaven and has also met Jesus Christ in person multiple times, believes that nothing happens after someone dies, reflecting his atheist views. A depressed Stewie, believing that life is not really worth living, makes several suicide attempts. During his final attempt by jumping out the window, he is stopped by Brian, who tells him that no one truly knows what happens after death and that he should seek out his reason to live. Stewie tells Brian that he has always wanted to be a singer-songwriter, prompting a frustrated Brian to give Stewie a gun in case he wants to kill himself.

== Reception ==
Eric Thurm of The A.V. Club gave the episode a C+, saying "The good parts of "Mom's The Word" are more than outweighed by how tonally inconsistent it is...it’s almost impossible to pay attention to the episode as a whole, especially when the episode attempts to do something a bit weightier than the show’s normal outings." Thurm did however praise the sub-plot, saying, "the better plot spinning off is the Brian and Stewie B-plot (surprise, surprise)."

The episode received a 2.2 rating in the 18- to 49-year-old demographic and was watched by a total of 4.56 million people. This made it the most watched show on Animation Domination that night, beating Bob's Burgers and two episodes of The Simpsons.
