= It All Begins with You =

"It All Begins With You"

Single by Jody Watley

from the album Affairs of the Heart
- Released: June 8, 1992
- Label: MCA
- Songwriters: George Lyter, Michael O'Hara, Denise Rich
- Producer: Jody Watley

Jody Watley singles chronology
"I'm the One You Need" (1992)	"It All Begins With You" (1992)	"Your Love Keeps Working on Me" (1993)

Music video
- "It All Begins with You" on YouTube

"It All Begins With You" is the final single from Jody Watley's third album, Affairs of the Heart. Reaching number 80 on the U.S. R&B chart, it became her first solo single to miss the pop chart.

== Charts ==
Chart (1992)	Peak position
South Africa (RISA)	2
U.S. Billboard Hot R&B Singles	80
U.S. Billboard Hot Adult Contemporary Tracks	48
