= Intimacy (disambiguation) =

Intimacy refers to an intimate relationship between two people or among three or more people.

Intimacy may also refer to:

- Physical intimacy, physical aspects of an intimate relationship
- Emotional intimacy, emotional aspects of an intimate relationship

== Literature ==
- Intimacy (novel), a 1998 novel by Hanif Kureishi
- "Intimacy", a short story by Jean-Paul Sartre collected in The Wall
- "Intimacy", a short story by Raymond Carver

== Film ==
- Intimacy (1966 film), an American film
- Intimacy (2001 film), a film by Patrice Chéreau, loosely based on the 1998 novel

== Music ==
- Intimacy (Jody Watley album) (1993)
- Intimacy (Bruce Roberts album) (1995) or its title song
- Intimacy (Matt Redman album) (1998) or its title song
- Intimacy (Bloc Party album) (2008)
- "Intimacy" (song), a 1988 song by Machinations

== See also ==
- Intimate (disambiguation)
