= List of Kevin Spencer episodes =

Kevin Spencer is a Canadian adult animated comedy television series developed by Greg Lawrence. It originally ran on The Comedy Network from January 17th, 1999 to November 6, 2005. A total of 113 episodes aired over the course of 8 seasons, only two episodes were banned throughout the series, that is The New Mr. Franklin and Fire Starter, both episodes became lost media, however, both episodes were later recovered via Fire Starter, which was only found in the Catalonian dub.

== Series overview ==
Season	Episodes	Originally released		Region 1 DVD Release date
Season	Episodes	First released	Last released	Region 1 DVD Release date
1	13	January 17, 1999	April 11, 1999	TBA
2	18	October 31, 1999	February 27, 2000	TBA
3	19	October 15, 2000	October 21, 2001	TBA
4	18	October 7, 2001	March 3, 2002	TBA
5	13	February 2, 2003	April 27, 2003	TBA
6	13	October 26, 2003	January 18, 2004	TBA
7	13	October 31, 2004	February 13, 2005	TBA
8	6	October 2, 2005	November 4, 2005	TBA

== Episodes ==
=== Season 1 (1999) ===
No. overall	No. in season	Title	Directed by	Written by	Original release date
1	1	"A First Time For Everything"	Dave Bigelow	Greg Lawrence	January 17, 1999
2	2	"Allen the Magic Goose"	Dave Bigelow	Greg Lawrence	January 24, 1999
3	3	"Life Lessons"	Dave Bigelow	Greg Lawrence	January 31, 1999
4	4	"A Pillar of the Community"	Dave Bigelow	Greg Lawrence	February 7, 1999
5	5	"Family Values"	Dave Bigelow	Greg Lawrence	February 14, 1999
6	6	"The Golden Days of Youth"	Dave Bigelow	Greg Lawrence and Rick Kaulbars	February 21, 1999
7	7	"Psychiatrist #1/No.1(Franklin Goes Nuts)"	Dave Bigelow	Greg Lawrence and Rick Kaulbars	February 28, 1999
8	8	"The New Mr. Franklin (Parent/Teacher Interview)"	Dave Bigelow	Greg Lawrence and Rick Kaulbars	March 7, 1999
9	9	"Fire Starter (Magic Roy)"	Dave Bigelow	Greg Lawrence and Rick Kaulbars	March 14, 1999
10	10	"Ward of the State"	Dave Bigelow	Greg Lawrence and Rick Kaulbars	March 21, 1999
11	11	"Public Offender"	Dave Bigelow	Greg Lawrence and Rick Kaulbars	March 28, 1999
12	12	"Drugs for the Democracy"	Dave Bigelow	Greg Lawrence and Rick Kaulbars	April 4, 1999
13	13	"Keep the Home Fires Burning"	Dave Bigelow	Greg Lawrence and Rick Kaulbars	April 11, 1999

=== Season 2 (1999-2000) ===
No. overall	No. in season	Title	Directed by	Written by	Original release date
14	1	"There Goes the Neighborhood"	Dave Bigelow	Greg Lawrence	October 31, 1999
15	2	"A Day Off"	Dave Bigelow	Greg Lawrence	November 7, 1999
16	3	"Squirrels"	Dave Bigelow	Greg Lawrence	November 14, 1999
17	4	"Malled By a Dog"	Dave Bigelow	Greg Lawrence and Rick Kaulbars	November 21, 1999
18	5	"In Like Plunt"	Dave Bigelow	Greg Lawrence and Rick Kaulbars	November 28, 1999
19	6	"In Kevin We Trust"	Dave Bigelow	Greg Lawrence	December 5, 1999
20	7	"The Crime Fighting Vagina"	Dave Bigelow	Greg Lawrence	December 12, 1999
21	8	"The Widow Coulson"	Dave Bigelow	Greg Lawrence and Rick Kaulbars	December 19, 1999
22	9	"Good Will Spencer"	Dave Bigelow	Greg Lawrence and Rick Kaulbars	December 26, 1999
23	10	"Field Tripping"	Dave Bigelow	Greg Lawrence and Rick Kaulbars	January 2, 2000
24	11	"The Art of Pornman"	Adrienne Reid	Greg Lawrence and Rick Kaulbars	January 9, 2000
25	12	"The Potted Goose"	Dave Bigelow	Greg Lawrence and Rick Kaulbars	January 16, 2000
26	13	"The Stripper Strikes Back"	Adrienne Reid	Greg Lawrence and Rick Kaulbars	January 23, 2000
27	14	"Corrupting Our Youth"	Adrienne Reid	Greg Lawrence and Rick Kaulbars	January 30, 2000
28	15	"Runaway"	Adrienne Reid	Greg Lawrence	February 6, 2000
29	16	"The Tomb"	Dave Bigelow	Greg Lawrence	February 13, 2000
30	17	"Dreamland"	Dave Bigelow	Greg Lawrence	February 20, 2000
31	18	"The Cruise"	Dave Bigelow	Greg Lawrence	February 27, 2000

=== Season 3 (2000-01) ===
No. overall	No. in season	Title	Directed by	Written by	Original release date
32	1	"Homeward Bound"	Adrienne Reid	Rick Kaulbars	October 15, 2000
33	2	"Invisible Sociopath"	Adrienne Reid	Rick Kaulbars	October 22, 2000
34	3	"Night School"	Adrienne Reid	Rick Kaulbars	October 29, 2000
35	4	"Bruno Gerussi Must Die"	Adrienne Reid	Rick Kaulbars	November 5, 2000
36	5	"Festival of Flowers"	Adrienne Reid	Rick Kaulbars	November 12, 2000
37	6	"Operators Are Standing By"	Adrienne Reid	Rick Kaulbars	November 19, 2000
38	7	"Mont Surreal"	Adrienne Reid	Rick Kaulbars	November 26, 2000
39	8	"Homunculus"	Adrienne Reid	Rick Kaulbars	December 3, 2000
40	9	"Drunken Welfare Man vs. Evil"	Adrienne Reid	Rick Kaulbars	December 10, 2000
41	10	"Jacked In"	Adrienne Reid	Rick Kaulbars	January 7, 2001
42	11	"M.O.W."	Adrienne Reid	Rick Kaulbars	January 14, 2001
43	12	"Practical Jokes"	Adrienne Reid	Rick Kaulbars	January 21, 2001
44	13	"Orion"	Adrienne Reid	Rick Kaulbars	January 28, 2001
45	14	"Much Like Percy, Christmas Only Comes But Once a Year"	Adrienne Reid	Rick Kaulbars	February 3, 2001
46	15	"Dooley and Chubbs"	Adrienne Reid	Rick Kaulbars	February 11, 2001
47	16	"Pat-riot-ism"	Adrienne Reid	Rick Kaulbars	February 18, 2001
48	17	"Blackout"	Adrienne Reid	Rick Kaulbars	February 25, 2001
49	18	"A Day in School"	Adrienne Reid	Rick Kaulbars	March 4, 2001
50	19	"Web54U"	Adrienne Reid	Rick Kaulbars	March 10, 2001

=== Season 4 (2001-02) ===
No. overall	No. in season	Title	Directed by	Written by	Original release date
51	1	"Bingo"	Dave Bigelow	Rick Kaulbars	October 16, 2001
52	2	"Snowfort"	Dave Bigelow	Rick Kaulbars	October 23, 2001
53	3	"The Talented Mr. Spencer"	Dave Bigelow	Rick Kaulbars	October 23, 2001
54	4	"Hostage Cupcake"	Dave Bigelow	Rick Kaulbars	November 6, 2001
55	5	"Fang"	Dave Bigelow	Rick Kaulbars	November 13, 2001
56	6	"Bruno Gerussi Must Die Again"	Dave Bigelow	Rick Kaulbars	November 20, 2001
57	7	"Add Beer Ad"	Dave Bigelow	Rick Kaulbars	November 27, 2001
58	8	"Peacekeeping Percy"	Dave Bigelow	Rick Kaulbars	December 4, 2001
59	9	"Serial Killer"	Dave Bigelow	Rick Kaulbars	December 11, 2001
60	10	"Retooling the Tool"	Dave Bigelow	Rick Kaulbars	December 18, 2001
61	11	"Big Ass Spooky Halloween"	Dave Bigelow	Rick Kaulbars	December 24, 2001
62	12	"BUZZ"	Dave Bigelow	Rick Kaulbars	January 14, 2002
63	13	"Letters, Legs and Booze"	Dave Bigelow	Greg Lawrence	January 21, 2002
64	14	"Chile"	Dave Bigelow	Greg Lawrence	January 28, 2002
65	15	"The Room"	Dave Bigelow	Greg Lawrence	February 4, 2002
66	16	"Showdown"	Dave Bigelow	Greg Lawrence	February 11, 2002
67	17	"Kevin's Girl"	Dave Bigelow	Greg Lawrence	February 18, 2002
68	18	"Beach Blanket Bloodbath"	Dave Bigelow	Greg Lawrence	February 25, 2002

=== Season 5 (2003) ===
No. overall	No. in season	Title	Directed by	Written by	Original release date
69	1	"Writing the Wrongs"	Dave Bigelow	Rick Kaulbars	February 23, 2003
70	2	"Slingshot"	Dave Bigelow	Rick Kaulbars	February 9, 2003
71	3	"Watered Down"	Dave Bigelow	Rick Kaulbars	February 16, 2003
72	4	"Spankdriven"	Dave Bigelow	Greg Lawrence	February 2, 2003
73	5	"Plan 9 from Project Housing"	Dave Bigelow	Rick Kaulbars	March 2, 2003
74	6	"Working the Rigs"	Dave Bigelow	Rick Kaulbars	March 9, 2003
75	7	"Two Strokes and You're Playing With It"	Dave Bigelow	Rick Kaulbars	March 16, 2003
76	8	"Sore Throats"	Dave Bigelow	Rick Kaulbars	March 23, 2003
77	9	"Sleeping It Off"	Dave Bigelow	Rick Kaulbars	March 30, 2003
78	10	"Plastic Percy"	Dave Bigelow	Rick Kaulbars	April 6, 2003
79	11	"Drunken Welfare Man vs. Vernon"	Dave Bigelow	Rick Kaulbars	April 13, 2003
80	12	"Hey, Barkeep!"	Dave Bigelow	Greg Lawrence	April 20, 2003
81	13	"Kevin, the Musical"	Dave Bigelow	Greg Lawrence	April 27, 2003

=== Season 6 (2003-04) ===
No. overall	No. in season	Title	Directed by	Written by	Original release date
82	1	"Home Improv-ment"	Dave Bigelow	Rick Kaulbars	October 26, 2003
83	2	"Don't Fear the Reefer"	Dave Bigelow	Rick Kaulbars	November 2, 2003
84	3	"That Guy Who Liked Pie"	Dave Bigelow	Rick Kaulbars	November 9, 2003
85	4	"Hogtown Hogwild"	Dave Bigelow	Rick Kaulbars	November 16, 2003
86	5	"Dogfight"	Dave Bigelow	Rick Kaulbars	November 23, 2003
87	6	"Olympics Special"	Dave Bigelow	Rick Kaulbars	November 30, 2003
88	7	"Yes! Yes! Oh God! Yes, Prime Minister!"	Dave Bigelow	Rick Kaulbars	December 7, 2003
89	8	"What Goes Around Comes Around"	Dave Bigelow	Rick Kaulbars	December 14, 2003
90	9	"Snowed In"	Dave Bigelow	Rick Kaulbars	January 18, 2004
91	10	"Mother's Little Helper"	Dave Bigelow	Rick Kaulbars	December 28, 2003
92	11	"Doing Time"	Dave Bigelow	Rick Kaulbars	January 4, 2004
93	12	"That Thing You Can Only Say in French"	Dave Bigelow	David Elver	January 11, 2004
94	13	"Merry Christmas, Asshole!"	Dave Bigelow	Greg Lawrence	December 21, 2003

=== Season 7 (2004-05) ===
No. overall	No. in season	Title	Directed by	Written by	Original release date
95	1	"Legitimate Claims"	Dave Bigelow	Rick Kaulbars	November 7, 2004
96	2	"Blow Job"	Dave Bigelow	Rick Kaulbars	November 14, 2004
97	3	"Urban Trans-Hit"	Dave Bigelow	Rick Kaulbars	November 21, 2004
98	4	"Games Without Frontiers"	Dave Bigelow	Rick Kaulbars	November 28, 2004
99	5	"Black Like Percy"	Dave Bigelow	Rick Kaulbars	December 5, 2004
100	6	"The Heroic Spencers"	Dave Bigelow	Rick Kaulbars	December 12, 2004
101	7	"The Buck Stops Here"	Dave Bigelow	Greg Lawrence	December 19, 2004
102	8	"Quest"	Dave Bigelow	Greg Lawrence	January 9, 2005
103	9	"One Grand Annoyance"	Dave Bigelow	Greg Lawrence	January 16, 2005
104	10	"Uncle Lester"	Dave Bigelow	Greg Lawrence	January 23, 2005
105	11	"Treble Charger"	Dave Bigelow	Greg Lawrence	October 31, 2004
106	12	"Demolition Derby"	Dave Bigelow	Greg Lawrence	February 6, 2005
107	13	"Booze Club"	Dave Bigelow	Greg Lawrence	February 13, 2005

=== Season 8 (2005) ===
No. overall	No. in season	Title	Directed by	Written by	Original release date
108	1	"The Missing Links"	Dave Bigelow	Greg Lawrence	October 2, 2005
109	2	"Killing the Messenger"	Dave Bigelow	Rick Kaulbars	October 9, 2005
110	3	"Hell or High Water"	Dave Bigelow	Greg Lawrence	October 16, 2005
111	4	"Die a Lot More and Also Once Again"	Dave Bigelow	Greg Lawrence	October 23, 2005
112	5	"Air Show"	Dave Bigelow	Rick Kaulbars	October 30, 2005
113	6	"See You in Hell"	Dave Bigelow	Greg Lawrence	November 4, 2005
