= Intimate media =

Intimate media are media artifacts created and collected by individuals, friends, and families to capture and commemorate aspects of family and intimate relationships. Intimate media includes such things as personal and family photo collections, home videos and films, diaries and journals, and letters. Depending on the meaning and values attributed to an object, anything could be considered intimate media. Great value is placed on intimate media possessions due to its ability to serve as "proof" that an event or memory actually occurred.

== Intimate media in relation to technology ==
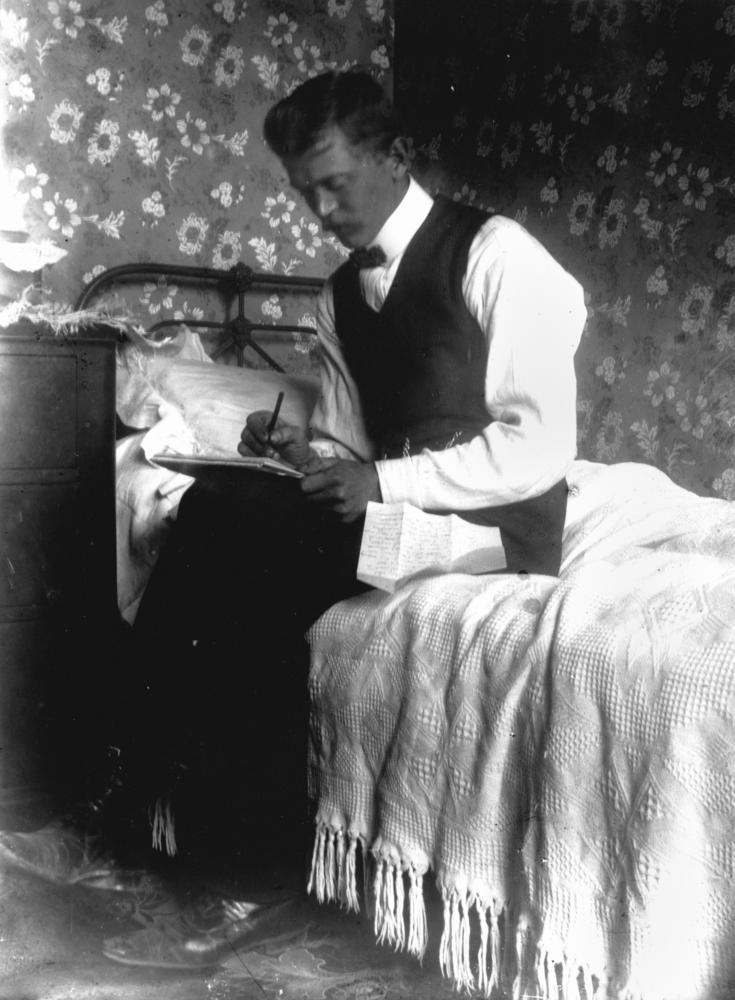
Intimate portrait of a man writing a letter, 1900-1910 (State Library of Queensland courtesy)

"Our memory and the stories we create, share, retell and live are a powerful way in which we determine and express who we are."

In their chapter of The New Everyday: Views on Ambient Intelligence, entitled Intimate Media: Emotional Needs and Ambient Intelligence, John Cass, Lorna Goulden, and Slava Kozlov discuss the ways in which humans, as they "become familiar with the potential of new technologies in their workplaces...find ways to re-use what they have encountered there and find benefits in other parts of their lives." This process has led to the onset of digital and social media-based "intimate media," such as digital scrapbooks, email, text messaging, Pinterest pages, blogs, the "messages" portion of Facebook, online photo-sharing websites such as Flickr, and websites like YouTube. Human memory and computer memory are quite different in terms of their accuracy and durability. Storing intimate media on a computer mechanism helps to preserve the accuracy of the memory and lengthens its life as well. One potential problem with fusing intimate media and technology is that most technological intimate media is stored rather than displayed—it lives on hard drives, CDs, and the internet. The decorative nature of non-technological intimate media allows a person to imbue their living space with memories, triggers of happy moments, sentimental objects, and the like. The onset of technologies such as digital photo-frames, however, has begun to solve these technological deficiencies. This new virtual digital domain opens up a whole world of possibilities. With intimate media now becoming increasingly digitalized, its potential for mobility, sharing, and copying is increasing drastically. Not only can a person transfer intimate media from one person or household to another, but the same intimate media can also be viewed simultaneously in a limitless number of locations. This opens up a new realm: ambient intelligence. Now intimate media is no longer confined to bookshelves, mantles, closets, and coffee tables. It can travel with a person in her/his pocket, via cell phone or other digital device, wherever s/he goes.
