= When a Man Loves a Woman (Jody Watley song) =

Single by Jody Watley

from the album Intimacy
- Released: 1994
- Genre: Swingbeat; hip hop; house (remix)
- Label: MCA
- Songwriter(s): Larry Campbell; Jody Watley
- Producer(s): Art & Rhythm; P.M. Dawn (remix version)

Jody Watley singles chronology
"Your Love Keeps Working on Me" (1993)	"When a Man Loves a Woman" (1994)	"Ecstasy" (1994)

Music video
- "When a Man Loves a Woman" on YouTube

"When a Man Loves a Woman" is a song by American singer-songwriter Jody Watley, released in 1994 by MCA Records as the final single from her fourth album, Intimacy (1993). The song was co-written by Watley with Larry Campbell, and peaked at number 11 on the US Billboard R&B Singles Chart and number 33 on the UK Singles Chart. It became Watley's first top-40 hit in the UK since "Friends" in 1989 and also became a number-one UK club hit. The accompanying music video was directed by Watley herself, marking her debut as a director.

== Critical reception ==
Upon the release, Larry Flick from Billboard magazine complimented "When a Man Loves a Woman" as a "clever and unusual single." He explained, "Watley waxes poetic and philosophical about relationships, chatting over an insinuating, midtempo hip-hop groove. Track in enhanced by soft singing at the chorus and several imaginative, format-stretching remixes. Already building a base at urban radio, the time is right for this gem at top 40." Bill Speed and John Martinucci from the Gavin Report described the song as "a monologue observing key elements of an unconditional relationship between a man and a woman."

Andy Beevers from Music Week gave it four out of five and named it Pick of the Week in the category of Dance, adding that "this features Watley's softly spoken monologue over a mellow swing rhythm. Excellent house remixes by BBG have taken the track to the top of the RM Club Chart and are going to generate significant demand." Pan-European magazine Music & Media wrote, "...and with this late great soul singer she shares the social conscience reflected by her lyrics. 'When a Man Loves a Woman' carries out the message of the reality of Aids, which he won't bring home to you by some other love he's made." James Hamilton from the Record Mirror Dance Update described it as a "mumbling slinky swayer (not the Percy Sledge classic) about the ways a new man should treat a woman" and "sultrily muttered instructions about the right ways to treat the one you love without giving them AIDS".

== Track listings ==
- US cassette maxi-single
1. Album version
2. Remix version
3. D.J.'s club Mix
4. Instrumental version
- UK CD single
1. "When a Man Loves a Woman" (radio mix)
2. "When a Man Loves a Man" (BBG Deep mix edit)
3. "When a Woman Loves a Woman" (BBG Deep mix edit)
4. "Ecstasy" (B.Y.C. 12-inch)

== Charts ==
=== Weekly charts ===
Chart (1994)	Peak position
UK Singles (OCC)	33
UK Dance (Music Week)	2
UK Club Chart (Music Week)	1
US Bubbling Under Hot 100 Singles (Billboard)	15
US Dance Singles Sales (Billboard)	39
US Hot Dance Club Play (Billboard)	8
US Hot R&B Singles (Billboard)	11

=== Year-end charts ===
Chart (1994)	Position
UK Club Chart (Music Week)	31
US Hot R&B Singles (Billboard)	79

== Release history ==
Region	Date	Format(s)	Label(s)	Ref.
United States	1994	12-inch vinyl; cassette	MCA	
United Kingdom	May 9, 1994	12-inch vinyl; CD; cassette	MCA	
