= Your Love Keeps Working on Me =

Single by Jody Watley

from the album Intimacy
- Released: October 12, 1993
- Genre: R&B; pop; new jack swing
- Label: MCA
- Songwriters: John Barnes; Joey Diggs; Robert White
- Producers: Art & Rhythm

Jody Watley singles chronology
"It All Begins with You" (1992)	"Your Love Keeps Working on Me" (1993)	"When a Man Loves a Woman" (1994)

Music video
- "Your Love Keeps Working on Me" on YouTube

"Your Love Keeps Working on Me" is a song performed by the song's co-writer, Joey Diggs, and appeared on the soundtrack to the film Bebe's Kids.

== Jody Watley version ==
"Your Love Keeps Working on Me" was covered by American singer Jody Watley and released in October 1993, by MCA Records, as the first single from her fourth album, Intimacy (1994). The song reached number 26 on the US Billboard Hot R&B Singles chart, and was a number two dance hit on the Billboard Hot Dance Club Play chart.

=== Charts ===
==== Weekly charts ====
Chart (1993)	Peak position
Europe (European Dance Radio)	17
South Africa (RISA)	39
US Billboard Hot 100	100
US Hot Dance Club Play (Billboard)	2
US Hot R&B Singles (Billboard)	26
US Maxi-Singles Sales (Billboard)	29

==== Year-end charts ====
Chart (1994)	Position
US Hot Dance Club Play (Billboard)	26
