= Affairs of the Heart (album) =

1991 studio album by Jody Watley

Studio album by Jody Watley
- Released: December 3, 1991
- Recorded: 1991
- Studios: Encore Recording Studios (Los Angeles, CA); Granny's House Recording Studios (Reno, NV); Lion Share Studios (Los Angeles, CA); Loft Studios (Los Angeles, CA); Quad Recording Studios (New York, NY); Skip Saylor Recording (Los Angeles, CA); Soundtrack Recording Studios (New York, NY); Studio Masters (Los Angeles, CA); Vanguard Recording Studios (Detroit, MI)
- Genre: R&B
- Length: 53:13
- Label: MCA
- Producers: Terry Coffey; André Cymone; David Morales; Jon Nettlesbey; Michael J. Powell; Jody Watley

Jody Watley chronology
You Wanna Dance with Me? (1989)	Affairs of the Heart (1991)	Intimacy (1993)

Singles from Affairs of the Heart
- 1. "I Want You" Released: November 5, 1991; 2. "I'm the One You Need" Released: February 18, 1992; 3. "It All Begins with You" Released: June 8, 1992

Professional ratings
Review scores
Source	Rating
AllMusic	4/5 stars
Entertainment Weekly	B
Rolling Stone	2/5 stars

Affairs of the Heart is the third studio album by American contemporary R&B singer Jody Watley; released on December 3, 1991 via MCA Records.

== Commercial performance ==
The album produced the following singles: "I Want You" a top five on US R&B Singles and no. 61 on Billboard Hot 100; the second single "I'm the One You Need" hit top 20 on both the US Hot 100 and US R&B, and top five on US Dance/Club Play Songs chart. Its third and final single "It All Begins With You" received moderate airplay and peaked at no. 48 on US Adult Contemporary, but failed to chart on the Hot 100 or R&B singles.

== Track listing ==
No.	Title	Writer(s)	Producer(s)	Length
1.	"I Want You"	André Cymone; Jody Watley	Cymone	4:04
2.	"Call on Me"	Cymone; Watley	Cymone	4:18
3.	"I'm the One You Need"	David Morales; Alec Shantzis; Watley	David Morales	4:21
4.	"Affairs of the Heart"	Cymone; Watley	Cymone	5:31
5.	"Commitment of Love"	George Lyter; Michael O'Hara; Denise Rich	Michael J. Powell	4:52
6.	"It All Begins with You"	Lyter; O'Hara; Rich	Watley	4:56
7.	"Dance to the Music"	Terry Coffey; Jon Nettlesbey; Watley	Nettlesbey; Coffey	4:16
8.	"Strange Way"	Cymone; Watley	Cymone	5:15
9.	"Always and Forever"	Cymone; Watley	Cymone	4:52
10.	"Until the Last Goodbye"	Coffey; Nettlesbey; Watley	Nettlesbey; Coffey	6:06
11.	"Stolen Moments"	Watley; Bruce Woolley	Cymone; Watley	4:44
Total length:				53:14

== Personnel ==
- Jody Watley – lead vocals, backing vocals (1, 2, 3, 5–11), vocal arrangements (1, 2, 4, 7, 8, 9, 11), arrangements (6)
- André Cymone – keyboards (1, 2, 4, 8, 9, 11), guitars (1, 2, 4, 8, 9, 11), bass (1, 2, 4, 8, 9, 11), drums (1, 2, 4, 8, 9, 11), backing vocals (1, 2, 8, 9, 11), vocal arrangements (1, 2, 4)
- Alex Shantzis – keyboard programming (3)
- Peter "Ski" Schwartz – acoustic piano (3)
- Vernon D. Fails – keyboards (5), rhythm arrangements (5)
- David Ward – synthesizer programming (5)
- Don Goldstein – programming (6)
- Terry Coffey – keyboards (7, 10), synthesizers (7, 10), rhythm arrangements (7, 10), vocal arrangements (7, 10)
- Duane Nettlesbey – additional programming (7, 10)
- Kelton Cooper – guitars (3)
- Dean Parks – acoustic guitar (4)
- Michael J. Powell – guitars (5), drums (5), percussion (5), rhythm arrangements (5)
- Dean Pleasants – rhythm guitar (10)
- Jon Nettlesbey – bass (7), drums (7, 10), percussion (7, 10), rhythm arrangements (7, 10), vocal arrangements (7, 10)
- Horace "Bokie" Coleman – bass (10)
- David Morales – drums (3), percussion (3), arrangements (3), BGV arrangements (3)
- Brian Kilgore – percussion (11)
- Danny Madden – BGV arrangements (3)
- Chris Cameron – arrangements (6)
- Alfa Anderson Barfield – backing vocals (3)
- Paulette McWilliams – backing vocals (3)
- Brenda White-King – backing vocals (3)
- Angel Rogers – backing vocals (5, 6)
- Valerie Pinkston-Mayo – backing vocals (5, 6, 11)
- Fred White – backing vocals (5, 6)
- Nadirah Ali – backing vocals (10)
- Voncielle Faggett – backing vocals (11)
- John Watley – backing vocals (11)

== Production ==
- Jody Watley – executive producer, producer (6), art direction, design, wardrobe stylist
- André Cymone – producer (1, 2, 4, 8, 9, 11)
- David Morales – producer (3), mixing (3)
- Michael J. Powell – producer (5)
- Terry Coffey – producer (7)
- Jon Nettlesbey – producer (7)
- Bobby Brooks – recording (1, 2, 4, 8, 9, 11)
- Hugo Dwyer – recording (3)
- John Poppo – recording (3), mixing (3), mix engineer (3)
- David Sussman – recording (3), mix engineer (3)
- David Ward – recording (5)
- Wolfgang Aichholz – recording (6), overdub recording (7, 10), vocal recording (7, 10), additional vocal recording (10)
- Norman Whitfield – basic track recording (7), overdub recording (7), mixing (7)
- Chris Puram – basic track recording (10)
- Dan Marnien – additional recording (5)
- Steve Gallagher – assistant engineer (5)
- Alan Meyerson – mixing (1, 4, 6, 10, 11)
- Ken Kessie – mixing (2, 8, 9)
- Barney Perkins – mixing (5)
- Milton Chan – assistant mix engineer (5)
- Brian Gardner – mastering
- Ivy Skoff – production coordination (1, 2, 4, 8, 9, 11)
- Margo Chase – art direction, design
- Guzman (Constance Hansen and Russell Peacock) – cover photography
- Victoria Pearson – centerfold photography
- Wallace Butts – wardrobe assistance
- Peter Savic – hair stylist
- Paul Starr – make-up
- Lippman Kahane Entertainment – management

Studios

- Recorded at The Loft (Hollywood, California); Skip Saylor Recording, Studio Masters and Lion Share Recording (Los Angeles, California); Encore Studios (Burbank, California); Granny's House (Reno, Nevada); Quad Recording Studios (New York City, New York).
- Mixed at The Enterprise and Encore Studios (Burbank, California); Can-Am Recorders (Tarzana, California); Granny's House; Electric Lady Studios and Soundtrack Studios (New York City, New York).
- Mastered at Bernie Grundman Mastering (Hollywood, California).

== Charts ==
=== Weekly charts ===
Chart (1991–1992)	Peak position
South African Albums (RISA)	19
Japanese Albums (Oricon)	53
US Billboard 200	124
US Top R&B/Hip-Hop Albums (Billboard)	21

=== Year-end charts ===
Chart (1992)	Position
US Top R&B/Hip-Hop Albums (Billboard)	65

=== Singles ===
Year	Single	Chart	Peak position
1991	"I Want You"	Hot R&B/Hip-Hop Songs	5
1991	"I Want You"	Billboard Hot 100	61
1992	"I Want You"	Dance/Club Play Songs	17
1992	"I Want You"	Hot Dance Music/Maxi-Singles Sales	7
1992	"I'm the One You Need"	Dance/Club Play Songs	3
1992	"I'm the One You Need"	Hot Dance Music/Maxi-Singles Sales	4
1992	"I'm the One You Need"	Hot R&B/Hip-Hop Songs	23
1992	"I'm the One You Need"	Billboard Hot 100	19
1992	"It All Begins With You"	Hot R&B/Hip-Hop Songs	80
1992	"It All Begins With You"	Hot Adult Contemporary Tracks	48
