= Butch Patterson: Private Dick =

- Created by: Greg Lawrence
- Written by: Greg Lawrence
- Directed by: Greg Lawrence
- Starring: Greg Lawrence; Vivian Burns; David L. McCullum; Susan Brooks; John Ng; David Elver; Sarah Van Diepen
- Country of origin: Canada
- No. of seasons: 3
- No. of episodes: 39

Production
- Producer: Greg Lawrence
- Production locations: Ottawa, Ontario, Canada
- Running time: 22 minutes

Original release
- Network: The Comedy Network
- Release: February 27, 1999 – January 31, 2001

Butch Patterson: Private Dick is a Canadian serial comedy television series centering on the seedy exploits of a self-described premature ejaculating, alcoholic, kleptomaniac, sexually deviant private detective played by Canadian actor/comedian Greg Lawrence. The series had a three season run, airing on The Comedy Network. Although the show was not a critical or commercial success, it maintains a small cult following. After the series' initial run, reruns were featured on the now defunct CBC Country Canada. Since then, all three original seasons have been released on DVD.

== Style ==
Most of the episodes are focused around the cases that Butch Patterson is investigating at the time. Unlike most comedy series, Butch Patterson has a contiguous plot line running throughout the entire three seasons. The show is shot in a drab hue that provides a film noir feel. Much of the humour is derived from the candid narrative of Butch as he reflects on his cases and his general state of affairs. There is a heavy reliance on recurring jokes about Butch's seemingly irrational disdain for bartenders and tailors, his chagrin regarding his childhood bullies and his brassy, open references to his sexual dysfunction. Other gags involve his near unquenchable craving for alcohol and cheap cigars, as well as his tendency towards kleptomania.

== Music ==
The show features a short jazz theme song that plays during the opening and ending credits [more info needed]. The score featured throughout much of each episode synchronizes emphatically with the tone of each scene, adding greatly to the comic impression upon the viewer.

== Characters ==
Butch Patterson (Greg Lawrence) - A hard-bitten private detective who suffers from alcoholism, kleptomania, a tendency to prematurely ejaculate, chronic urinary problems that cause him to continually wet his pants, and a tendency to shoot himself while cleaning his gun. Butch enjoys prostitutes, pornography, cigars, any and every kind of alcoholic drink, and making crank calls to a man named Frank. He hates tailors, has a disturbing predilection for trying on lingerie, and is still trying (and failing) to live down a certain incident at a local petting zoo. Butch also has an unfortunate tendency to misplace his pants, and to wake up in strange places after having too much to drink. He is also banned from the local petting zoo.

Blanche DuMaurier (Vivian Burns) - A virtuous, hardworking newspaper reporter, Blanche is generally disgusted by Butch's deviant tendencies, but often assists him with his various problems, most notably bailing him out of jail on multiple occasions. She is a staunch foe of Tommy Rubella's criminal empire, and strives to bring him down with the help of Butch and the Swede.

Tommy Rubella (David L. McCallum) - The crime lord and kingpin of the city where Butch Patterson lives and operates. Despite seeming like an imposing figure, he is intimidated by domineering women, including Debbie Hitler and Jasmine Griffin, fearing them for very good reason. He is a talented accordion player, and has a tattoo of Buddy Ebsen on his back, something which his wife hates.

Debbie Hitler (Susan Brooks) - Tommy Rubella's power-hungry wife, who possesses an extremely violent temper and a strange fetish for deck wood. Known for beating, maiming and killing people for even the slightest offence, she terrifies even Tommy and the Swede.

"The Swede" aka Serge Lacroix (John Ng) - A contract killer who ostensibly works for Tommy and Debbie as an assassin, but he serves as a double agent, frequently double-crossing his employers and working with Blanche in her investigations of Tommy and Debbie. Killing is his favorite pastime, although he is a consummate company man, only doing so when his employer gives the order. Butch insists that the Swede is French, a claim that is later proven true when it is revealed that the Swede is an undercover French Canadian police agent.

Vance Van Vandervan (David Elver) - The crooked curator of the Scott Baio Museum of Fine Art, Vance is involved in the dirty dealings of Debbie, Tommy and Jasmine, constantly playing each side against the other as he tries to further his own agenda. He greatly enjoys roast chicken, and has an unfortunate tendency to wet his bed.

Jasmine Griffen (Sarah Van Diepen) - The ex-lover of both Tommy and Vance. Now a conniving, manipulative seductress, Jasmine attempts to manipulate Tommy, Vance and Butch for her own purposes. In her youth, she travelled through Finland as a circus performer after overcoming an addiction to crystal meth.

== Episodes ==
=== Season 1 (1999) ===
No. overall	No. in season	Title	Directed by	Written by	Original release date
1	1	"The Jewel Heist: Part 1"	Greg Lawrence	Greg Lawrence	February 27, 1999
2	2	"The Jewel Heist: Part 2"	Greg Lawrence	Greg Lawrence	March 6, 1999
3	3	"The Hit"	Greg Lawrence	Greg Lawrence	March 13, 1999
4	4	"Call Him Ishmail"	Greg Lawrence	Greg Lawrence	March 20, 1999
5	5	"Losing It"	Greg Lawrence	Greg Lawrence	March 27, 1999
6	6	"The Dinner Party"	Greg Lawrence	Greg Lawrence	April 3, 1999
7	7	"The Affair"	Greg Lawrence	Greg Lawrence	April 10, 1999
8	8	"Strike One"	Greg Lawrence	Greg Lawrence	April 17, 1999
9	9	"Mom"	Greg Lawrence	Greg Lawrence	April 24, 1999
10	10	"The Dance Contest"	Greg Lawrence	Greg Lawrence	May 1, 1999
11	11	"The Chase"	Greg Lawrence	Greg Lawrence	May 8, 1999
12	12	"The Reading Drive"	Greg Lawrence	Greg Lawrence	May 15, 1999
13	13	"The Wrath of Vance"	Greg Lawrence	Greg Lawrence	May 22, 1999

=== Season 2 (2000) ===
No. overall	No. in season	Title	Directed by	Written by	Original release date
14	1	"The Return of Vance"	Jolynn Sommervill	Greg Lawrence	February 12, 2000
15	2	"Head Wound"	Jolynn Sommervill	Greg Lawrence	February 19, 2000
16	3	"Debbie Gets a Trout"	Jolynn Sommervill	Greg Lawrence	February 26, 2000
17	4	"Altar, He Go"	Greg Lawrence	Greg Lawrence	March 4, 2000
18	5	"The Stake-Out"	Greg Lawrence	Greg Lawrence	March 11, 2000
19	6	"The Ties That Bind"	Greg Lawrence	Greg Lawrence	March 18, 2000
20	7	"Old Lady Digthorpe"	Greg Lawrence	Greg Lawrence	March 25, 2000
21	8	"The Big Meeting"	Greg Lawrence	Greg Lawrence	April 1, 2000
22	9	"Birds, Booze and Gas"	Greg Lawrence	Greg Lawrence	April 8, 2000
23	10	"The Approximate Size of a Human Head"	Greg Lawrence	Greg Lawrence	April 15, 2000
24	11	"The Beginning of the End"	Greg Lawrence	Greg Lawrence	April 22, 2000
25	12	"The Plan Underway"	Greg Lawrence	Greg Lawrence	April 29, 2000
26	13	"The Plan Revealed"	Greg Lawrence	Greg Lawrence	May 6, 2000

=== Season 3 (2000–01) ===
No. overall	No. in season	Title	Directed by	Written by	Original release date
27	1	"An Affair to Forget"	Greg Lawrence	Greg Lawrence	November 8, 2000
28	2	"Fresh Tarts"	Greg Lawrence	Greg Lawrence	November 15, 2000
29	3	"Ante Up"	Greg Lawrence	Greg Lawrence	November 22, 2000
30	4	"Shrinking Heads"	Greg Lawrence	Greg Lawrence	November 29, 2000
31	5	"Alley Oops"	Greg Lawrence	Greg Lawrence	December 6, 2000
32	6	"Snapsy Come Home"	Greg Lawrence	Greg Lawrence	December 13, 2000
33	7	"Those Who Can't, Teach"	Greg Lawrence	Greg Lawrence	December 20, 2000
34	8	"Oh Yea: Part 1"	Greg Lawrence	Greg Lawrence	December 27, 2000
35	9	"Oh Yea: Part 2"	Greg Lawrence	Greg Lawrence	January 3, 2001
36	10	"Hepcat on the Catwalk"	Greg Lawrence	Greg Lawrence	January 10, 2001
37	11	"I, Thadius"	Greg Lawrence	Greg Lawrence	January 17, 2001
38	12	"How to Make Love"	Greg Lawrence	Greg Lawrence	January 24, 2001
39	13	"The End of it All"	Greg Lawrence	Greg Lawrence	January 31, 2001
