= Intimacy (Jody Watley album) =

Studio album by Jody Watley
- Released: November 9, 1993
- Recorded: 1993
- Genre: R&B, pop, dance, soul, jazz
- Length: 50:41
- Label: MCA
- Producer: Art & Rhythm, André Cymone, Philip Kelsey, David Morales

Jody Watley chronology
Affairs of the Heart (1991)	Intimacy (1993)	Remixes of Love (1994)

Singles from Intimacy
- 1. "Your Love Keeps Working on Me" Released: October 12, 1993; 2. "When a Man Loves a Woman" Released: January 11, 1994; 3. "Ecstasy" Released: February 17, 1994

Professional ratings
Review scores
Source	Rating
AllMusic	3/5 stars
Calgary Herald	C−
Entertainment Weekly	B+
Los Angeles Times	2/4 stars
Orlando Sentinel	2/5 stars

Intimacy is the fourth studio album by American pop singer Jody Watley, released in 1993 (see 1993 in music) on MCA.

== Track listing ==
No.	Title	Writer(s)	Producer(s)	Length
1.	"Workin' on a Groove"	André Cymone; Jody Watley	André Cymone	4:59
2.	"When a Man Loves a Woman"	Larry Campbell; Watley	Art & Rhythm	5:34
3.	"Are You the One?"	Cymone; Watley	Cymone	5:03
4.	"Too Shy to Say"	Stevie Wonder	Cymone	3:13
5.	"Your Love Keeps Working on Me"	John Barnes; Joey Diggs; Robert White	Art & Rhythm	4:39
6.	"Ecstasy"	Terry Burrus; David Morales; Watley	David Morales	5:16
7.	"To Be With You"	Cymone; Watley	Cymone	4:50
8.	"Together"	Campbell; Watley	Art & Rhythm	4:58
9.	"Take Me in Your Arms"	Terry Coffey; Jon Nettlesbey; Watley	Nettlesbey; Coffey	6:35
10.	"Best of Me"	Gardner Cole; Cymone	Cymone	5:35
Total length:				50:41

- Tracks 1, 3, 7 Copyright A Diva Music-Rightsong/Ultrawave Music-EMI April Music. Tracks 2, 8 Copyright A Diva Music-Rightsong/Art & Rhythm Inc-Zomba Enterprises. Track 4 Copyright Jobete Music-Black Bull Music. Track 5 Copyright WB Music-Kulu Shay Music-Tix Music-Interscope Music-Thug Music/Brandi Jo Music-Famous Music Corp.
- Track 6 Copyright A Diva Music-Rightsong/Def Mix Music-EMI Music/EMI April Music/EMI Virgin Music. Track 9 Copyright A Diva Music-Rightsong/Big Giant Music-Coffey-Nettlesby Music-Warner-Tamerlane Publishing Corp.. Track 10 Copyright Ultrawave Music-EMI April Music/Sizzling Blue Music-Warner Tamerlane Music.

== Personnel ==
- Jody Watley – vocals, backing vocals
- André Cymone – drums, bass, keyboards, guitars
- Brian Kilgorec – percussion
- Scott Mayo – saxophone
- Tommy Morgan – harmonica
- Larry "Rock" Campbell – drum, keyboard programming
- Chris Hunter – trumpet
- Peter "Ski" Schwartz – keyboard programming
- Terry Burrus – keyboard programming
- David Morales – drum programming
- Chris Botti – flute
- Terry Coffey – keyboards, synthesizers, rhythm arrangements
- Jon Nettlesbey – keyboards, synthesizers, drums, percussion, rhythm arrangements
- Duane Nettlesbey – additional programming
- Gene Page – string arrangements, conductor
- Paulette McWilliams – backing vocals
- Brenda White-King – backing vocals
- Alfa Anderson Barfield – backing vocals

Production

- Producers – Art & Rhythm (for Zomba Recording Inc.), André Cymone, Philip Kelsey, David Morales (for Def Mix Productions), John Nettlesbey & Terry Coffey (for Mercenary Productions)
- Executive producer – Jody Watley
- Engineers – Wolfgang Aichholz, Bobby Brooks, Pete Christensen, André Cymone, Hugo Dwyer, John Poppo, Chris Purham, David Sussman, Chris Trevett
- Assistant engineers – Pete Christensen, Rail Jon Rogut
- Mixing – Bobby Brooks, Alan Meyerson, David Morales, John Poppo, David Rideau, Chris Trevett
- Mixing assistants – Kimm James, Will Williams
- Remixing – Andre Fischer, Philip Kelsey, Dave Way
- Remix assistant – Bill Leonard
- Mastering – Steve Hall
- Production coordination – Ivy Skoff

== Charts ==
=== Weekly charts ===
Chart (1993)	Peak position
South African Albums (RISA)	48
Japanese Albums (Oricon)	43
US Billboard 200	164
US Top R&B/Hip-Hop Albums (Billboard)	38

=== Singles ===
Year	Single	Chart	Peak position
1993	"Your Love Keeps Working on Me"	Hot Dance Music/Club Play	2
1993	"Your Love Keeps Working on Me"	Hot R&B/Hip-Hop Singles	26
1993	"Your Love Keeps Working on Me"	Billboard Hot 100	100
1994	"When a Man Loves a Woman"	Hot Dance Music/Club Play	8
1994	"When a Man Loves a Woman"	Hot Dance Music/Maxi-Singles Sales	39
1994	"When a Man Loves a Woman"	Hot R&B/Hip-Hop Singles	11
1994	"Your Love Keeps Working on Me"	Hot Dance Music/Maxi-Singles Sales	29
