= Burly Bear Network =

American television network

- The official logo for the Burly Bear Network
- Country: United States

Ownership
- Owner: Privately held (1994–1997); Broadway Video (1997–2002)

History
- Founded: 1994; 32 years ago
- Launched: 1994
- Founder: Danny Stein, Brian Nurenberg, Danny Ameri, James Mairs
- Closed: Sept. 2002
- Replaced by: National Lampoon Network

The Burly Bear Network was an American cable TV channel targeted at 18- to 24-year-old college students founded in 1994. The company was created by four friends from Connecticut — Danny Stein, Brian Nurenberg, Danny Ameri, and James Mairs; and led by CEO Stein. Programming was offered on some university TV stations, including Arizona State University, Louisiana State University, Ball State University, Iowa State University, Northern Kentucky University, Purdue University, the University of Dayton, the University of Missouri, Berry College, Michigan State University, and Indiana University East in Richmond, as well as late nights on TBS.

The Network was a privately held company, under CEO Danny Stein, who ran the company while Ameri and Mairs led production, and Nurenberg led distribution. The network provided programming to college students on university television stations across the United States, and it operated an events business that brought branded entertainment to campuses.

Stein led a sale to Lorne Michaels's Broadway Video in May 1997, and then departed in 1999 after the company was integrated into Broadway Video. Howard Handler was hired in 1999 as CEO with Ted Jessup as the head of programming. In September 2002, the company was bought by National Lampoon for an undisclosed amount. This sale corresponded to the end of programming on TBS. The network was folded into the National Lampoon Network around September 2002.

== Programs ==
Some programming included

- Half Baked (1997 – 2003)
- National Rage Page (a.k.a. NPR) (1997 – 2000)
- Shredder's Way (1997)
- Break This (1998)
- Expedition (1998)
- The Kids in the Hall (1998 – 2002)
- Tame Show (Hosted by Jodi Lennon, celeb interviews, undercover camera, sketches) (1998 – 2000)
- Burlyvision (2000 – 2001)
- Crash Pad (2000)
- The Henry Brothers (2000 – 2001)
- Shock Therapy (2000)
- Laarr's Lounge (2000)
- No Cover (2000)
- Press Junky (off-beat celeb interviews & movie reviews) (2000)
- Shuffle (2000)
- Stripped Down (2000)
- Thrillavision (2000)
- Kevin Spencer (2 minute airings, later evolved into a TV show on the Comedy Channel in 1999. These shorts were then remade in Mondo Media and Canal 33 in 2001) (1998-1999)
- A/V Squad (2003-2007)
- Bridget the Midget (2003-2004)
- Collegetown USA (2003-2007)
- Crash (2003)
- Gamers (2003-2007)
- The Gleib Show (2003-2004)
- Impostor (pranks and hidden cameras) (2003)
- Master Debaters (2003-2004)
- Riffage (2003)
- Tooned Up (2003-2004)
- Xotic Xtreme (2003-2004)
- Clubbin' (2004)
- Comedy Academy (2004-2007)
- Comedy Night School (2004-2006)
- Funny Money (2004-2005)
- Gutterball Alley (2004-2005)
- Planet X (2004-2006)
- ON-AIR (2004)
- Beef Baloney (2005)
- Ultimate Destination (2005)
- Not So Silent Pictures (2005-2006)
- Reality Bar Crawl (2005)
- Dave and Steve's Video Game Explosion
- Celebrity Highway
- Overkill! (extreme sports)
- Sexology (relationships)
- Saturday Night Live

=== Network promos ===
The commercials and promo videos for the Burly Bear Network were created and produced by Mike Henry and Patrick Henry, whose other work included the FOX television series Family Guy, American Dad! and The Cleveland Show.
