= I Want You (Jody Watley song) =

Single by Jody Watley

from the album Affairs of the Heart
- Released: November 5, 1991
- Genre: R&B
- Label: MCA
- Songwriters: André Cymone, Jody Watley
- Producer: André Cymone

Jody Watley singles chronology
"Precious Love" (1990)	"I Want You" (1991)	"I'm the One You Need" (1992)

Music video
- "I Want You" on YouTube

"I Want You" is a song by American singer and songwriter Jody Watley, released in November 1991 by MCA Records, as the first single from her third album, Affairs of the Heart (1991). It is written by Watley with its producer André Cymone, and peaked at numbers 61 and 68 on the US Billboard Hot 100 and Cash Box Top 100 charts. The accompanying music video was directed by British director Andy Morahan, and was featured on an episode of Beverly Hills, 90210.

== Charts ==
=== Weekly charts ===
Chart (1991)	Peak position
South Africa (RISA)	28
US Billboard Hot 100	61
US Hot Dance Club Play (Billboard)	17
US Hot R&B Singles (Billboard)	5
US Cash Box Top 100	68

=== Year-end charts ===
Chart (1992)	Position
US Hot R&B Singles (Billboard)	64
