= I'm the One You Need =

Single by Jody Watley

from the album Affairs of the Heart
- Released: February 18, 1992
- Genre: Pop
- Label: MCA
- Songwriters: Jody Watley; David Morales; Alec Shantzis
- Producer: David Morales

Jody Watley singles chronology
"I Want You" (1991)	"I'm the One You Need" (1992)	"It All Begins with You" (1992)

Music video
- "I'm the One You Need" on YouTube

"I'm the One You Need" is a song by American singer-songwriter Jody Watley, released in February 1992 by MCA Records as the second single from her third album, Affairs of the Heart (1991). Co-written by Watley with house music pioneer David Morales and Alec Shantzis, the song constitutes Watley's initial foray into house music (though its "Affairs of the Heart" predecessor, "I Want You", boasted a house version). "I'm the One You Need" was Watley's seventh top-20 pop single in the US, and sixth top five dance single, charting at numbers 15 and 19 on the Cash Box Top 100 and Billboard Hot 100 charts, and number three on the Hot Dance Music/Club Play chart. The accompanying music video features a topless Watley reciting the song's spoken word intro, and then performing the rest of the song with her backup band.

== Significance ==
"I'm the One You Need" is often credited with introducing DJ David Morales' then-darker sound to the worldwide remixing community. Indeed, British DJ, John Digweed re-edited the Morales' “Dead Zone” version of the song for its inclusion on his [Digweed] edition of the Azuli Records compilation, Choice - A Collection of classics, and cited it as an influence on the UK DJing community in the compilation's liner notes:

This track was really hard to get hold of at the time, but on one of my trips to Chicago, Derrick Carter gave me a copy of it - it's one of Morales' best mixes. It had a big influence on the UK producers who really picked up on Morales' dark hypnotic sound.

== Official remixes ==
- Radio Edit
- David Morales Extended Club Version
- Def Dub Version
- Driza Bone 7-inch Edit
- Driza Bone 12-inch Mix
- Driza Bone Funky Chicken Version

== Charts ==
=== Weekly charts ===
Chart (1992)	Peak position
Canada Top Singles (RPM)	32
Europe (European Dance Radio)	5
Netherlands (Single Top 100)	64
South Africa (RISA)	20
UK Singles (OCC)	50
UK Airplay (Music Week)	45
UK Dance (Music Week)	18
UK Club Chart (Music Week)	14
US Billboard Hot 100	19
US Hot Dance Club Play (Billboard)	3
US Hot R&B Singles (Billboard)	23
US Cash Box Top 100	15

=== Year-end charts ===
Chart (1992)	Position
US Hot Dance Club Play (Billboard)	45
US Hot Dance 12-Inch Singles (Billboard)	41
