= Luther Vandross discography =

Cataloging of published recordings by Luther Vandross

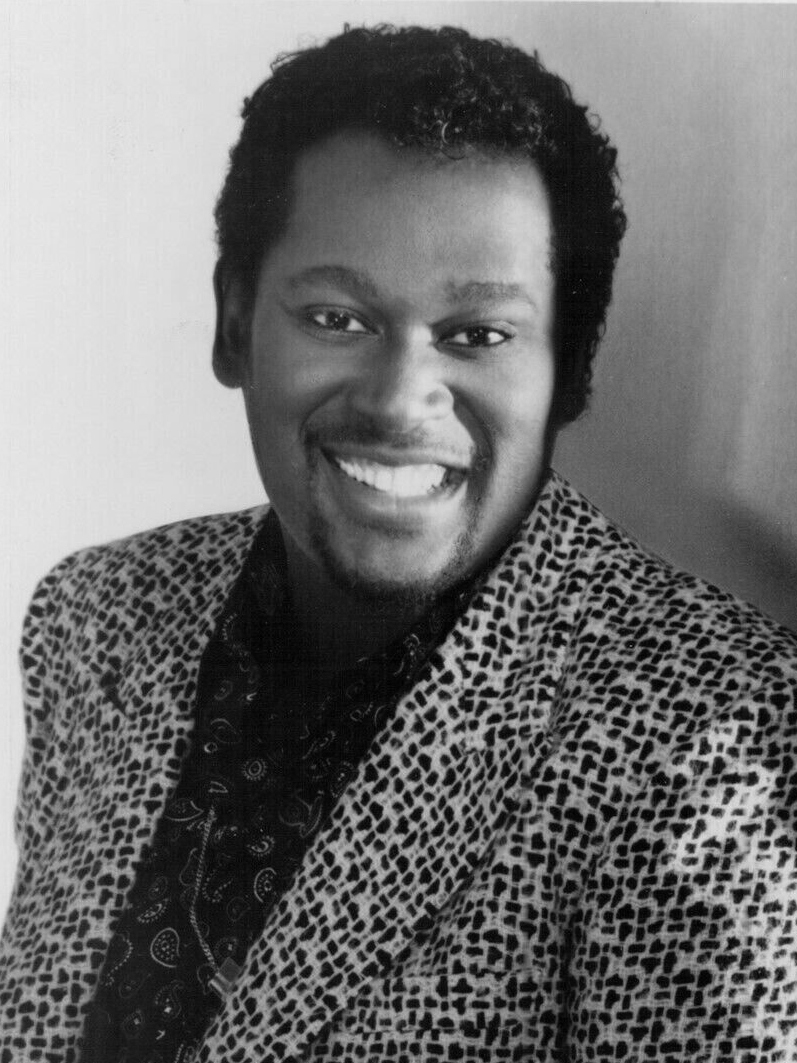
- Vandross in 1985.
- Studio albums: 13
- Live albums: 1
- Compilation albums: 20
- Singles: 59

This is the discography documenting albums and singles released by American singer Luther Vandross. Vandross has sold approximately 40 million records worldwide.

== Albums ==
=== Studio albums ===
Title	Details	Peak chart positions									Certifications
Title	Details	US	US R&B	AUS	AUT	CAN	GER	NED	NZ	UK	Certifications
Never Too Much	Released: August 12, 1981; Label: Epic; Format: CD, LP	19	1	—	—	—	—	—	—	41	RIAA: 2× Platinum
Forever, for Always, for Love	Released: September 21, 1982; Label: Epic/Legacy; Format: CD, LP	20	1	—	—	—	—	—	—	23	RIAA: Platinum; BPI: Platinum
Busy Body	Released: November 25, 1983; Label: Epic; Format: CD, LP	32	1	—	—	—	—	—	—	42	RIAA: Platinum
The Night I Fell in Love	Released: March 8, 1985; Label: Epic; Format: CD, LP	19	1	—	—	—	—	—	25	19	RIAA: 2× Platinum
Give Me the Reason	Released: September 19, 1986; Label: Epic; Format: CD, LP	14	1	—	—	92	—	—	—	3	RIAA: 2× Platinum; BPI: 2× Platinum
Any Love	Released: September 20, 1988; Label: Epic; Format: CD, LP	9	1	103	—	—	—	—	35	3	RIAA: Platinum; BPI: Gold
Power of Love	Released: April 26, 1991; Label: Epic; Format: CD, LP	7	1	110	34	19	—	—	—	9	RIAA: 2× Platinum; MC: Gold; BPI: Silver
Never Let Me Go	Released: May 26, 1993; Label: Epic; Format: CD, LP	6	3	107	—	—	—	53	—	11	RIAA: Platinum
Songs	Released: September 20, 1994; Label: Epic; Format: CD, LP	5	2	19	27	23	24	20	5	1	RIAA: 2× Platinum; MC: Platinum; RIANZ: Gold; BPI: Platinum
Your Secret Love	Released: October 1, 1996; Label: Epic; Format: CD, LP	9	2	145	—	18	—	61	—	14	RIAA: Platinum; MC: Gold; BPI: Silver
I Know	Released: August 11, 1998; Label: Virgin; Format: CD, LP, digital download	26	9	—	—	—	—	—	—	42	RIAA: Gold
Luther Vandross	Released: June 19, 2001; Label: J; Format: CD, digital download	6	2	—	—	—	—	—	—	—	RIAA: Platinum
Dance with My Father	Released: June 10, 2003; Label: J; Format: CD, digital download	1	1	60	—	—	—	—	—	41	RIAA: 2× Platinum; MC: Gold; BPI: Platinum
"—" denotes items that did not chart or were not released in that territory.

=== Compilation albums ===
Title	Details	Peak chart positions							Certifications
Title	Details	US	US R&B	AUS	CAN	GER	NED	UK	Certifications
The Best of Luther Vandross... The Best of Love	Released: October 4, 1989; Label: Epic; Format: CD, LP	26	2	—	75	—	—	14	RIAA: 3× Platinum
Greatest Hits 1981–1995	Released: October 1995; Label: Epic; Format: CD, LP	—	—	119	—	82	90	12	BPI: Gold
One Night with You: The Best of Love, Volume 2	Released: September 1997; Label: Epic; Format: CD, LP	44	17	186	—	—	—	56	RIAA: Gold
Love Is on the Way	Released: May 1998; Label: Sony; Format: CD	—	—	—	—	—	—	—	RIAA: Gold
Always & Forever: The Classics	Released: September 1998; Label: Epic; Format: CD	—	85	—	—	—	—	—	
Greatest Hits	Released: November 1999; Label: Epic; Format: CD	—	—	—	—	—	—	—	RIAA: Platinum
Smooth Love	Released: November 2000; Label: Sony; Format: CD, digital download	—	—	—	—	—	—	—	
The Ultimate Luther Vandross	Released: August 2001; Label: J; Format: CD, digital download	—	—	—	—	—	—	—	
Stop to Love	Released: April 2002; Label: Sony; Format: CD, digital download	—	—	—	—	—	—	—	
The Very Best of Love	Released: July 2002; Label: Madacy; Format: CD, digital download	—	—	—	—	—	—	—	
The Essential Luther Vandross	Released: June 2003; Label: Epic/Legacy; Format: CD, digital download	154	49	—	—	—	—	18	RIAA: Platinum; BPI: Gold
Artist Collection: Luther Vandross	Released: October 2004; Label: BMG/J; Format: CD, digital download	—	—	—	—	—	—	—	
The Ultimate Luther Vandross	Released: August 2006; Label: J/Epic/Legacy; Format: CD, digital download	9	3	—	—	—	—	10	RIAA: Gold; BPI: Platinum
Love, Luther	Released: November 2007; Label: Epic; Format: CD, digital download	191	23	—	—	—	—	—	
Lovesongs	Released: February 2009; Label: Sony; Format: CD, digital download	—	—	—	—	—	—	4	BPI: Gold
Playlist: The Very Best of Luther Vandross	Released: April 2009; Label: Epic/Legacy; Format: CD, digital download	—	72	—	—	—	—	—	
S.O.U.L.	Released: 2011; Label: BMG/Sony; Format: CD, digital download	—	57	—	—	—	—	—	
Hidden Gems	Released: April 2012; Label: Epic/Legacy; Format: CD, digital download	183	25	—	—	—	—		
The Greatest Hits	Released: November 2014; Label: RCA; Format: CD, digital download	—	—	—	—	—	—	21	BPI: Gold
Never Too Much: Greatest Hits	Released: December 13, 2024; Label: Sony Legacy; Format: CD, digital download, LP	—	—	—	—	—	—	—	
"—" denotes items that did not chart or were not released in that territory.

=== Holiday albums ===
Title	Details	US chart peaks				Certifications
Title	Details	Billboard 200	Holiday Albums	Pop Catalog	R&B HipHop	Certifications
This Is Christmas	Released: October 1995; Label: Epic	28	4	—	4	RIAA: Platinum
Home for Christmas	Released: January 2002 (re-released November 4, 2003); Label: Epic	—	—	—	—	
The Classic Christmas Album	Released: October 2012; Label: Epic	138	39	35	18	
"—" denotes items that did not chart or were not released in that territory.

=== Live albums ===
Title	Details	US chart peaks	
Title	Details	Billboard 200	R&B HipHop
Live Radio City Music Hall 2003	Released: October 2003; Label: J	22	6

== Singles ==
=== As lead artist ===
List of singles as lead artist, with selected chart positions and certifications, showing year released and album name
Title	Year	Peak chart positions										Certifications	Album
Title	Year	US	US AC	US Club	US Dance Sales	US R&B/ HH	CAN	GER	IRE	NZ	UK	Certifications	Album
"Never Too Much"	1981	33	—	4	35	1	—	—	—	47	44	RIAA: Platinum; BPI: 3× Platinum	Never Too Much
"Don't You Know That?"	1981	107	—	—	—	10	—	—	—	—	—		Never Too Much
"Sugar and Spice (I Found Me a Girl)"	1982	—	—	—	—	72	—	—	—	—	—		Never Too Much
"If This World Were Mine" (with Cheryl Lynn)	1982	101	—	—	—	4	—	—	—	—	—		Instant Love
"Bad Boy"/"Having a Party" (Medley)	1982	55	—	—	—	3	—	—	—	—	—		Forever, for Always, for Love
"Since I Lost My Baby"	1983	—	—	—	—	17	—	—	—	—	—		Forever, for Always, for Love
"Promise Me"	1983	—	—	—	—	72	—	—	—	—	—		Forever, for Always, for Love
"You're the Sweetest One"	1983	—	—	—	—	—	—	—	—	—	127		Forever, for Always, for Love
"How Many Times Can We Say Goodbye" (with Dionne Warwick)	1983	27	4	—	—	7	—	—	—	—	99		Busy Body
"I'll Let You Slide"	1983	102	—	—	—	9	—	—	—	—	100		Busy Body
"Superstar"/"Until You Come Back to Me (That's What I'm Gonna Do)" (medley)	1984	87	—	—	—	5	—	—	—	—	—		Busy Body
"I Wanted Your Love"	1984	—	—	—	—	—	—	—	—	—	88		Busy Body
"Make Me a Believer"	1984	—	—	—	—	48	—	—	—	—	—		Busy Body
"Til My Baby Comes Home"	1985	29	—	—	10	4	—	—	—	26	103		The Night I Fell in Love
"It's Over Now"	1985	101	—	36	46	4	—	—	—	—	101		The Night I Fell in Love
"Wait for Love"	1985	—	—	—	—	11	—	—	—	—	—		The Night I Fell in Love
"If Only for One Night"	1986	—	—	—	—	59	—	—	—	—	—		The Night I Fell in Love
"Give Me the Reason"	1986	57	—	—	—	3	—	—	—	—	26		Give Me the Reason
"Stop to Love"	1986	15	7	27	15	1	91	—	—	—	24		Give Me the Reason
"There's Nothing Better Than Love" (with Gregory Hines)	1987	50	20	—	—	1	—	—	—	—	72		Give Me the Reason
"See Me"	1987	—	—	—	—	—	—	—	—	—	60		Give Me the Reason
"I Really Didn't Mean It"	1987	—	—	—	—	6	—	—	24	—	16		Give Me the Reason
"So Amazing"	1987	—	—	—	—	94	—	—	—	—	33	BPI: Silver	Give Me the Reason
"I Gave It Up (When I Fell in Love)"	1988	—	—	—	—	—	—	—	—	—	28		Give Me the Reason
"Any Love"	1988	44	12	—	—	1	63	—	26	26	31		Any Love
"She Won't Talk to Me"	1988	30	17	18	—	3	—	—	—	17	34		Any Love
"For You to Love"	1989	—	—	—	—	3	—	—	—	—	—		Any Love
"Come Back"	1989	—	—	—	—	—	—	—	—	—	53		Any Love
"Never Too Much" ('89 Remix by Justin Stauss)	1989	—	—	—	—	—	—	—	18	—	13		The Best of... The Best of Love
"Here and Now"	1989	6	3	—	—	1	54	—	—	—	43	RIAA: Platinum	The Best of... The Best of Love
"Treat You Right"	1990	—	—	—	—	5	—	—	—	—	92		The Best of... The Best of Love
"Power of Love/Love Power"	1991	4	3	—	11	1	8	—	—	45	46		Power of Love
"Don't Want to Be a Fool"	1991	9	5	—	—	4	42	—	—	—	84		Power of Love
"The Rush"	1991	73	—	—	44	6	—	—	—	—	53		Power of Love
"Sometimes It's Only Love"	1992	—	9	—	—	9	—	—	—	—	—		Power of Love
"The Best Things in Life Are Free" (with Janet Jackson, BBD and Ralph Tresvant)	1992	10	—	3	39	1	8	8	6	6	2	BPI: Silver	Mo' Money: Original Motion Picture Soundtrack
"Little Miracles (Happen Every Day)"	1993	62	30	—	—	10	—	—	—	—	28		Never Let Me Go
"Heaven Knows"	1993	94	—	15	39	24	89	69	—	—	34		Never Let Me Go
"Never Let Me Go"	1993	—	—	—	—	31	—	—	—	—	—		Never Let Me Go
"Love Is on the Way"	1993	—	—	—	—	—	—	—	—	—	38		Never Let Me Go
"Endless Love" (with Mariah Carey)	1994	2	11	—	25	7	6	14	4	1	3	RIAA: Gold; RIANZ: Platinum; BPI: Gold	Songs
"Always and Forever"	1994	58	25	—	—	16	74	—	—	—	20		Songs
"Love the One You're With"	1995	95	33	—	—	28	49	53	—	23	31		Songs
"Going in Circles"	1995	95	—	—	—	28	—	—	—	—	—		Songs
"Ain't No Stoppin' Us Now"	1995	—	—	—	—	—	—	82	—	50	22		Songs
"Every Year, Every Christmas"	1995	—	—	—	—	—	—	—	—	—	43		This Is Christmas
"Your Secret Love"	1996	52	—	—	—	5	—	—	—	—	14		Your Secret Love
"I Can Make It Better"	1996	80	—	—	—	15	—	—	—	—	44		Your Secret Love
"I Won't Let You Do That to Me"	1997	—	—	—	—	—	—	—	—	—	—		One Night with You: The Best of Love, Volume 2
"When You Call on Me/ Baby That's When I Come Runnin'"	1998	—	—	—	—	—	—	—	—	—	—		One Night with You: The Best of Love, Volume 2
"Nights in Harlem" (with Precise)	1998	—	—	—	—	29	—	—	—	—	—		I Know
"I Know" (with Stevie Wonder)	1998	—	—	—	—	61	—	—	—	—	—		I Know
"I'm Only Human" (with Cassandra Wilson & Bob James)	1999	—	—	—	—	57	—	—	—	—	—		I Know
"Are You Using Me?"	1999	—	—	46	—	—	—	—	—	—	—		I Know
"Take You Out"	2001	26	—	—	—	7	—	—	—	—	59		Luther Vandross
"Can Heaven Wait"	2001	—	—	3	—	63	—	—	—	—	—		Luther Vandross
"I'd Rather"	2002	83	17	—	—	40	—	—	—	—	—		Luther Vandross
"Dance with My Father"	2003	38	4	—	—	28	—	—	4	—	21	RIAA: Platinum; BPI: Gold	Dance with My Father
"Think About You"	2003	103	—	—	—	29	—	—	—	—	—		Dance with My Father
"Buy Me a Rose"	2004	—	13	—	—	—	—	—	—	—	—		Dance with My Father
"The Closer I Get to You" (with Beyoncé)	2004	—	—	—	—	62	—	—	—	—	—	RIAA: Gold	Dance with My Father
"Shine"	2006	116	—	10	—	31	—	—	—	—	50		The Ultimate Luther Vandross
"Got You Home"	2006	—	—	—	—	53	—	—	—	—	—		The Ultimate Luther Vandross
"Michelle"	2024	—	—	—	—	—	—	—	—	—	—		Never Too Much: Greatest Hits
"—" denotes items that did not chart or were not released in that territory.

=== As featured artist ===
List of singles as featured artist, with selected chart positions and certifications, showing year released
Title	Year	Peak chart positions			Certifications	Album
Title	Year	US	US AC	CAN	Certifications	Album
"Voices That Care" (with Various Artists)	1991	11	6	61	RIAA: Gold	Non-album single

== Other appearances ==
=== Soundtracks ===
Year	Title	Album
1981	"Just When I Needed You" (w/ Roberta Flack)	Bustin' Loose: Music from the Original Motion Picture Soundtrack
1985	"She's So Good to Me"	The Goonies: Original Motion Picture Soundtrack
1986	"Give Me the Reason"	Ruthless People: The Original Motion Picture Soundtrack
1987	"There's Only You"	Made in Heaven: Original Motion Picture Soundtrack
1992	"Heart of a Hero"	Hero: Original Motion Picture Soundtrack
1992	"The Best Things in Life Are Free"	Mo' Money: Original Motion Picture Soundtrack
1995	"The Thrill I'm In"	Money Train: Music from the Motion Picture
1999	"When You're A Woman"	The 24 Hour Woman: Music from the Shooting Gallery Motion Picture
2001	"If I Was the One"	Dr. Dolittle 2: Original Soundtrack

=== Others ===
Year	Title	Album
1975	"Young Americans" (David Bowie)	Young Americans
1979	"Dance Away" (Roxy Music)	Manifesto
1992	"The Christmas Song"	A Very Special Christmas 2
1994	"The Way She Loves Me" (Richard Marx)	Paid Vacation (album)
1996	"If I Had a Hammer"	For Our Children Too
2002	"What's Going On" (Doc Powell)	97th and Columbus
2014	"Finder of Lost Loves" (Duet with Dionne Warwick)	Finder of Lost Loves (Expanded Edition)

== Music videos ==
Year	Title	Director
1981	"Never Too Much"	
1983	"How Many Times Can We Say Goodbye" (with Dionne Warwick)	Tony Richmond
1985	"It's Over Now"	Ed Bianchi
1986	"Give Me the Reason"	Andy Morahan
1986	"Stop to Love"	Andy Morahan
1987	"There's Nothing Better Than Love" (with Gregory Hines)	Jon Small
1987	"I Really Didn't Mean It"	
1988	"Any Love"	
1988	"She Won't Talk to Me"	
1989	"Here and Now"	
1991	"Power of Love/Love Power"	Julien Temple
1991	"Don't Want to Be a Fool"	
1991	"The Rush"	
1991	"Voices That Care" (Various)	David S. Jackson
1992	"The Best Things in Life Are Free" (with Janet Jackson, BBD and Ralph Tresvant)	Paris Barclay
1993	"Little Miracles (Happen Every Day)"	
1993	"Heaven Knows"	
1993	"Never Let Me Go"	
1994	"Endless Love" (with Mariah Carey)	Big TV!
1995	"Love the One You're With"	
1995	"Every Year, Every Christmas"	Marcus Nispel
1996	"I Can Make It Better"	Bille Woodruff
1996	"Your Secret Love"	Kevin Bray
1998	"Nights in Harlem"	Kevin Bray
2001	"Take You Out"	Marcus Raboy
2002	"Can Heaven Wait"	Marcus Raboy
2003	"Dance with My Father"	Diane Martel
2024	"Michelle"	

== Other projects ==
- Recordings of Luther, a group led by Luther Vandross.
- Vandross also guested as lead vocalist for the U.S./Italian ensemble Change.

=== Luther ===
Studio albums

Title	Details
Luther	Released: June 1976; Label: Atlantic/Cotillion
This Close to You	Released: March 1977; Label: Atlantic/Cotillion

Singles

Year	Title	US chart peaks		Album
Year	Title	Club Play	R&B HipHop	Album
1976	"It's Good for the Soul (Pt. 1)"	11	28	Luther
1976	"Funky Music (Is a Part of Me)"	—	34	Luther
1976	"The 2nd Time Around"	—	34	Luther
1977	"This Close to You"	—	93	This Close to You
"—" denotes items that did not chart or were not released in that territory.

=== Change ===
Studio albums

Title	Details	US chart peaks		Certifications
Title	Details	Billboard 200	R&B HipHop	Certifications
The Glow of Love	Released: April 1980; Label: Warner Bros.	29	10	US: Gold

Singles

Year	Title	Peak chart positions				Album
Year	Title	US Club	US R&B/HH	IRE	UK	Album
1980	"Searching"	1	23	22	11	The Glow of Love
1980	"The Glow of Love"	1	49	—	14	The Glow of Love
"—" denotes items that did not chart or were not released in that territory.
