= The Ultimate Luther Vandross =

- Original 2001 release cover art

Greatest hits album by Luther Vandross
- Released: August 7, 2001; August 22, 2006 (2nd version)
- Genre: R&B, soul
- Length: 79:49
- Label: J, Epic, Legacy
- Producer: Luther Vandross, Walter Afanasieff, Marcus Miller, Leo Sacks (compilation producer)

Luther Vandross chronology
Luther Vandross (2001)	The Ultimate Luther Vandross (2001)	Stop to Love (2002)

Luther Vandross (2006) chronology
Artist Collection: Luther Vandross (2004)	The Ultimate Luther Vandross (2006)	Love, Luther (2007)

Alternative cover
- 2006 re-release cover art by Kwaku

Professional ratings
Review scores
Source	Rating
Allmusic	link 2001
Allmusic	link 2006

The Ultimate Luther Vandross is a greatest hits album by American R&B/soul singer Luther Vandross, released in 2001 (see 2001 in music). The compilation was re-released in 2006 with a different track listing, along with two previously unreleased songs. The unreleased cut "Got You Home" which appears on the 2006 edition of the compilation, earned Vandross a posthumous nomination for Best Male R&B Vocal Performance at the 49th Grammy Awards in 2007.

== Track listings ==
=== 2001 release ===
1. "Give Me the Reason" (Luther Vandross, Nat Adderley Jr.) – 4:45 (From the Motion Picture Soundtrack Ruthless People)
2. "Never Too Much" (Vandross) – 3:50 (From Never Too Much)
3. "If This World Were Mine" (Duet with Cheryl Lynn) (Marvin Gaye) – 4:00
4. "A House Is Not a Home" (Burt Bacharach, Hal David) – 7:08 (From Never Too Much)
5. "Don't Want to Be a Fool" (Vandross, Marcus Miller) – 4:34 (From Power of Love)
6. "So Amazing" (Vandross) – 3:41 (From Give Me the Reason)
7. "Til My Baby Comes Home" (Vandross, Miller) – 3:59 (From The Night I Fell in Love)
8. "There's Nothing Better Than Love" (Duet with Gregory Hines) (Vandross, John "Skip" Anderson) – 4:17 (From Give Me the Reason)
9. "Stop to Love" (Vandross, Miller) – 4:23 (From Give Me the Reason)
10. "Any Love" (Vandross, Miller) – 5:00 (From Any Love)
11. "Since I Lost My Baby" (Smokey Robinson, Warren Moore) – 3:52 (From Forever, for Always, for Love)
12. "Superstar" (Leon Russell, Bonnie Bramlett) – 5:38 (From Busy Body)
13. "Power of Love/Love Power" (Vandross, Miller, Teddy Vann) – 4:21 (From Power of Love)
14. "The Rush" (Vandross, Miller) – 3:56 (From Power of Love)
15. "It's Over Now" (Vandross, Miller) – 4:06 (From The Night I Fell in Love)
16. "Here and Now" (Terry Steele, David L. Elliott) – 5:22 (From The Best of Luther Vandross... The Best of Love)
17. "Love the One You're With" (Stephen Stills) – 3:45 (From Songs)

=== 2006 re-release ===
1. "Shine" (James Harris III, Terry Lewis, Bernard Edwards, Nile Rodgers) – 4:50 (Previously unreleased)
2. "Got You Home" (Bryan-Michael Cox, Jesse Rome, Harold Lilly) – 3:38 (Previously unreleased)
3. "Never Too Much" (Vandross) – 3:50 (From Never Too Much)
4. "Take You Out" (Warryn Campbell, Harold Lilly, John Smith) – 3:26 (From Luther Vandross)
5. "Superstar/Until You Come Back to Me (That's What I'm Gonna Do)" (Russell, Bramlett, Stevie Wonder, Morris Broadnax, Clarence Paul) – 4:32 (From Busy Body)
6. "Here and Now" (Steele, Elliott) – 5:22 (From The Best of Luther Vandross... The Best of Love)
7. "Dance with My Father" (Vandross, Richard Marx) – 4:25 (From Dance with My Father)
8. "A House Is Not a Home" (Bacharach, David) – 7:08 (From Never Too Much)
9. "Give Me the Reason" (Vandross, Adderley) – 4:45 (From the Motion Picture Soundtrack Ruthless People)
10. "I'd Rather" (Shep Crawford) – 4:19 (From Luther Vandross)
11. "Any Love" (Vandross, Miller) – 5:00 (From Any Love)
12. "Power of Love/Love Power" (Vandross, Miller, Vann) – 4:19 (From Power of Love)
13. "Think About You" (Vandross, James Porte) – 3:28 (From Dance with My Father)
14. "Wait for Love" (Vandross, Adderley) – 4:16 (From The Night I Fell in Love)
15. "Your Secret Love" (Vandross, Reed Vertelney) – 4:01 (From Your Secret Love)
16. "The Closer I Get to You" (Duet with Beyoncé) (Reggie Lucas, James Mtume) – 4:25 (From Dance with My Father)
17. "Buy Me a Rose" (Jim Funk, Erik Hickenlooper) – 3:48 (From Dance with My Father)
18. "Endless Love" (Duet with Mariah Carey) (Lionel Richie) – 4:18 (From Songs)
19. "Shine" (Freemasons Mixshow Radio Edit) (Japan bonus track)

==== Special collector's edition bonus disc ====
1. "Shine" (The Freemasons Mix) – 4:51
2. "Power of Love/Love Power" (The Dance Radio Mix) – 6:30
3. "Can Heaven Wait" (David Harness Soulful Club Mix) – 7:19
4. "Take You Out Tonight" (Allstar Remix) – 3:45
5. "I'd Rather" (Mike Rizzo Global Mix) – 3:36
6. "'Til My Baby Comes Home" (Dance Version) – 7:38
7. "Stop to Love" (12" Mix) – 5:32

== Charts ==
=== Weekly charts ===
Chart (2006)	Peak position
Irish Albums (IRMA)	7
Scottish Albums (OCC)	29
UK Albums (OCC)	10
US Billboard 200	9
US Top R&B/Hip-Hop Albums (Billboard)	3

=== Year-end charts ===
Chart (2006)	Position
UK Albums (OCC)	76
US Top R&B/Hip-Hop Albums (Billboard)	100

== Certifications ==
Region	Certification	Certified units/sales
Ireland (IRMA)	Gold	7,500^{^}
United Kingdom (BPI)	Gold	100,000^{^}
United States (RIAA)	Platinum	1,000,000^{‡}
^{^} Shipments figures based on certification alone.^{‡} Sales+streaming figures based on certification alone.
