= Artist Collection: Luther Vandross =

Compilation album by Luther Vandross
- Released: October 12, 2004
- Genre: R&B, soul
- Label: BMG International, J

Luther Vandross chronology
Live Radio City Music Hall 2003 (2003)	Artist Collection: Luther Vandross (2004)	The Ultimate Luther Vandross (2006)

Professional ratings
Review scores
Source	Rating
Allmusic	3/5 stars

Artist Collection: Luther Vandross is a compilation album by American R&B/soul singer Luther Vandross, released in 2004 (see 2004 in music) as part of BMG International's Artist Collection series, consisting of songs from Vandross' previous efforts Luther Vandross (2001), Dance with My Father (2003), and Live Radio City Music Hall 2003 (2003) plus a brand-new remix. The album's caricature-style artwork was made by Hanoch Piven, who also designed the cover art for the other albums from the Artist Collection series.

== Track listing ==
1. "Take You Out" – 3:26
2. "Buy Me a Rose" – 3:48
3. "I'd Rather" – 4:50
4. "Any Day Now" – 5:11
5. "Are You There (With Another Guy)" – 5:54
6. "Once Were Lovers" – 4:35
7. "The Glow of Love" (Live) – 5:44
8. "Never Too Much" (Live) – 4:03
9. "Stop to Love" (Live) – 5:17
10. "A House Is Not a Home" (Live) – 10:26
11. "If Only for One Night" (Live) – 5:58
12. "They Said You Needed Me" – 4:40
13. "Love Forgot" – 5:38
14. "Take Out Tonight" (Allstar Remix Radio Edit) – 3:43
