= Lovesongs (Luther Vandross album) =

LoveSongs

Compilation album by Luther Vandross
- Released: January 29, 2009
- Genre: R&B; soul
- Length: 74:00
- Label: Sony Music

Luther Vandross chronology
| The Ultimate Luther Vandross (2006) | LoveSongs (2009) |

Love Songs is a compilation album by American singer-songwriter Luther Vandross. It was released by Sony Music Entertainment unit J Records on January 29, 2009.

== Track listing ==
UK version

1. "Never Too Much" – 3:50
2. "Give Me the Reason" – 4:45
3. "Your Secret Love" – 4:01
4. "Dance with My Father" – 4:25
5. "Take You Out" – 3:26
6. "Got You Home" – 3:38
7. "Power of Love/Love Power" – 4:21
8. "So Amazing" – 3:41
9. "Buy Me a Rose" – 3:48
10. "Love the One You're With" – 3:45
11. "Any Love" – 5:02
12. "Always and Forever" – 4:53
13. "Endless Love" (Duet with Mariah Carey) – 4:18
14. "Love Is on the Way (Real Love)" – 4:43
15. "Heaven Knows" – 5:00
16. "Here and Now" – 5:22
17. "A House Is Not a Home" – 7:08
18. "See Me" – 5:29
19. "The Best Things in Life Are Free" (Duet with Janet Jackson) – 4:36

== Charts ==
| Chart (2009) | Peak position |
|---|---|
| Irish Albums (IRMA) | 73 |
| Scottish Albums (OCC) | 34 |
| UK Albums (OCC) | 4 |
| UK R&B Albums (OCC) | 1 |

== Certifications ==
| Region | Certification | Certified units/sales |
|---|---|---|
| United Kingdom (BPI) | Gold | 100,000^{*} |
^{*} Sales figures based on certification alone.
