= The Essential Luther Vandross =

Greatest hits album by Luther Vandross
- Released: March 5, 2002 (United Kingdom); June 10, 2003 (North America)
- Genre: R&B; pop; soul
- Label: Epic; Sony; Legacy
- Producer: Luther Vandross; Nat Adderley Jr.; Marcus Miller; Walter Afanasieff; Ray Bardani (compilation producer); Leo Sacks (compilation producer)

Luther Vandross chronology
| Dance with My Father (2003) | The Essential Luther Vandross (2002) | Live Radio City Music Hall 2003 (2003) |

Professional ratings
Review scores
| Source | Rating |
|---|---|
| AllMusic | 5/5 stars |

The Essential Luther Vandross is a greatest hits album by American singer Luther Vandross, released on March 5, 2002 in the UK and June 10, 2003 in the US, by Sony Music and Legacy Recordings as part of The Essential Series. The two-disc compilation features thirty-five tracks from Vandross's recording catalog. The collection contains R&B and pop hit songs spanning from Vandross earlier albums to the later—Dance with My Father, a Grammy win for Best R&B Album.

The set also includes hit duets with Janet Jackson, Dionne Warwick, and Mariah Carey. In 2005, The Essential Luther Vandross Plus was released with a bonus DVD of music videos, and 2008 as The Essential 3.0 included a bonus disc of songs. Unreleased tracks of "Love It, Love It", "Look To The Rainbow", and remixes of charting hit tracks.

== Background ==
The Essential Luther Vandross originally released in 2002 was a 30-track hits collection by the R&B/soul singer. The later updated 2015 version of The Essential Luther Vandross contains 35 tracks, from uptempo dance, sultry ballads, pop, two featured lead vocal tracks with Change to his 1981 debut album Never Too Much, 1990s albums and the multi-platinum hit album, Dance with My Father (2003).

Vandross pop hit duets with Janet Jackson ("The Best Things in Life Are Free"), Mariah Carey ("Endless Love"), and Beyonce ("The Closer I Get To You"). Some of his best charting hits is featured from "Never Too Much"; "Superstar"; "Give Me the Reason"; "Any Love"; "So Amazing"; "Wait for Love"; "Here and Now"; "Creepin'", to "Take Me Out" and "Dance With My Father" which won Grammys for Best R&B Vocal, Male and Song of the Year". The compilation also includes a cover performance of "Bridge Over Troubled Water" with Paul Simon and Jennifer Holliday.

== Track listings ==
=== UK edition (2002) ===
Disc 1

1. "Searching" (with Change)
2. "The Glow of Love" (with Change)
3. "Never Too Much"
4. "Sugar and Spice (I Found Me a Girl)"[Album Version]
5. "She's a Super Lady"
6. "Give Me the Reason"
7. "Stop to Love"
8. "See Me"
9. "I Really Didn't Mean It"
10. "Any Love"
11. "Here and Now"
12. "Love the One You're With"
13. "Ain't No Stoppin' Us Now" (Morales Remix)
14. "I Gave It Up (When I Fell in Love)" (Marcus Miller Mix)
15. "Power of Love/Love Power" (Dance Radio Mix)

Disc 2

1. "Ain't No Stoppin' Us Now"
2. "Always and Forever"
3. "Endless Love" (with Mariah Carey)
4. "She's So Good to Me"
5. "So Amazing"
6. "I Gave It Up (When I Fell in Love)"
7. "Your Secret Love"
8. "Little Miracles (Happen Every Day)"
9. "Heaven Knows"
10. "A House Is Not a Home"
11. "Power of Love/Love Power"
12. "My Sensitivity (Gets in the Way)"
13. "The Night I Fell in Love"
14. "Never Too Much" ('89 Remix)
15. "Stop to Love" (Marcus Miller Mix)

=== US edition (2003) ===
Disc 1

1. "Any Love"
2. "So Amazing"
3. "Wait for Love"
4. "Power of Love/Love Power"
5. "For You to Love"
6. "I (Who Have Nothing)" (with Martha Wash)
7. "Anyone Who Had a Heart"
8. "A House Is Not a Home"
9. "Never Too Much"
10. "Since I Lost My Baby"
11. "Stop to Love"
12. "It's Over Now"
13. "Your Secret Love"
14. "Superstar"
15. "Here and Now"

Disc 2

1. "Knocks Me Off My Feet"
2. "Goin' Out of My Head"
3. "If Only for One Night"
4. "Creepin'"
5. "She's So Good to Me"
6. "Give Me the Reason"
7. "She Loves Me Back"
8. "The Night I Fell in Love"
9. "If This World Were Mine" (with Cheryl Lynn)
10. "Don't Want to Be a Fool"
11. "There's Nothing Better Than Love" (with Gregory Hines)
12. "How Many Times Can We Say Goodbye" (with Dionne Warwick)
13. "Love the One You're With"
14. "Endless Love"
15. "I Want the Night to Stay"

Special edition reissue

These bonus versions are special addendums to the US release. Essential Plus DVD was originally released in 2004 titled From Luther with Love: The Videos.

US Essential Plus bonus DVD (2005)

1. "Don't Want to Be a Fool"
2. "Your Secret Love"
3. "Little Miracles (Happen Every Day)"
4. "I Can Make It Better"
5. "Stop to Love"
6. "Here and Now"
7. "Always and Forever" (Live)
8. "It's Over Now"
9. "She Won't Talk to Me"
10. "Never Too Much"
11. "There's Nothing Better Than Love" (with Gregory Hines)
12. "Power of Love/Love Power"
13. "Endless Love" (Live) (with Mariah Carey)
14. "Love the One You're With"
15. "Superstar" (Live)
16. Dear Friends
17. The Making of "Songs"/Medley: "Hello"/"The Impossible Dream"
18. "A House Is Not a Home" (Live)
19. Biography, Discography, and Photo Gallery

US Essential Disc 3 bonus CD (2008)

1. "My Sensitivity (Gets in the Way)" - 3:27
2. "Are You Gonna Love Me" - 5:11
3. "I'm Gonna Start Today" - 6:15
4. "Love Me Again" - 6:08
5. "Crazy Love" - 5:14
6. "Love Don't Love You Anymore" - 5:14
7. "Dance with My Father" - 4:25

=== US edition reissue (2015) ===
Disc 1

1. "Love It, Love It"
2. "Searching" (with Change)
3. "The Glow Of Love" (with Change)
4. "Never Too Much"
5. "A House Is Not A Home"
6. "Don't You Know That?"
7. "If This World Were Mine" (duet with Cheryl Lynn)
8. "Bad Boy / Having A Party" (Single Version)
9. "How Many Times Can We Say Goodbye" (duet with Dionne Warwick)
10. "Superstar"
11. "It's Over Now" (Single Version)
12. "Wait For Love" (Single Version)
13. "If Only For One Night"
14. "Creepin'"
15. Anyone Who Had A Heart"
16. "Give Me The Reason"
17. "There's Nothing Better Than Love" (duet with Gregory Hines)
18. "So Amazing"

Disc 2

1. "Stop To Love"
2. "Bridge Over Troubled Water" (with Paul Simon and Jennifer Holliday)^{1}
3. "Any Love" (Single Mix)
4. "Here And Now"
5. "Look To The Rainbow"
6. "Power Of Love / Love Power" (Master Single Version)
7. "Don't Want To Be A Fool"
8. "The Best Things In Life Are Free" (duet with Janet Jackson)
9. "Little Miracles (Happen Every Day)" (Single Version)
10. "Endless Love" (duet with Mariah Carey)
11. "Your Secret Love"
12. "Are You Using Me?" (Masters at Work Radio Remix)
13. "Take You Out" (Radio Edit)
14. "I'd Rather
15. "Dance with My Father"
16. "The Closer I Get to You" (Radio Edit)
17. "Shine" (Freemasons Mixshow)

^{1} "Bridge Over Troubled Water" (Live) from the televised special Cinemax Sessions - The All-Star Gospel Session

== Charts ==
| Chart (2003) | Peak position |
|---|---|
| Scottish Albums (OCC) | 55 |
| UK Albums (OCC) | 18 |
| UK R&B Albums (OCC) | 7 |
| US Billboard 200 | 154 |
| US Top R&B/Hip-Hop Albums (Billboard) | 49 |

== Certifications ==
| Region | Certification | Certified units/sales |
|---|---|---|
| United Kingdom (BPI) | Gold | 100,000^{*} |
| United States (RIAA) | Platinum | 1,000,000^{‡} |
^{*} Sales figures based on certification alone.^{‡} Sales+streaming figures based on certification alone.
