= Dance with My Father =

Dance with My Father may refer to:

- "Dance with My Father" (song), a 2003 song by Luther Vandross
- Dance with My Father (album), a 2003 album by Luther Vandross
