= Fascination (David Bowie song) =

Song by David Bowie

from the album Young Americans
- Released: 1975
- Recorded: December 1974
- Studio: Record Plant, New York City
- Genre: Funk
- Length: 5:43
- Label: RCA
- Songwriters: David Bowie, Luther Vandross
- Producer: Tony Visconti

"Fascination" is a song written by the English singer-songwriter David Bowie and the American musician Luther Vandross for Bowie's Young Americans album in 1975. The song originated from a Vandross song called "Funky Music (Is a Part of Me)" which The Mike Garson Band used to play before Bowie concerts in 1974.

An alternate mix appeared on the 1989 Sound + Vision box set, though this was replaced with the original on the 2003 reissue of the compilation. While Bowie never performed this track live in concert, it was rehearsed for potential inclusion in Bowie's set at the 1985 London Live Aid concert, though, along with "China Girl," it was eventually dropped from his final set list.

== Origin ==
Luther Vandross had written a song entitled "Funky Music (Is a Part of Me)" and was serving as a backup singer to Bowie's live tour in 1974. Vandross would sing "Funky Music" during the supporting portion of the shows on the tour. Bowie retained Vandross as a backup singer for the sessions of Young Americans. During those sessions Bowie and Vandross reworked "Funky Music" into "Fascination," including mostly brand new lyrics by Bowie, and included it on the album. When Bowie asked Vandross for permission to record "Funky Music" himself, Vandross responded "What do you mean 'let' you record it. I'm living in a building with an elevator that barely works and you're asking me to 'let' you record one of my songs." "Fascination" thus became Vandross' first published songwriting credit.

When Vandross formed his group Luther the following year, he included "Funky Music" as the first track of their first album Luther. According to Spin writer Barry Walters, "Funky Music" with Vandross' original lyrics is a "love song about music." Music writer Chris O'Leary describes the lyrics as being "a sales pitch for himself, a New York hustle" with lyrics such as "I do the singing, just give me a beat" that O'Leary describes as "pure George M. Cohan." Music journalist Peter Doggett calls it a celebration of Vandross' cultural heritage.

== Music and lyrics ==
Bowie biographer Nicholas Pegg describes the music of "Fascination" as "the most unabashed homage to Gamble and Huff's 'Philly' sound to be found on Young Americans." O'Leary states that it has an "ominous, snaking bass hook." Peter Doggett states that Bowie left Vandross' original "Funky Music" arrangement virtually unchanged, "as an utterly contemporary slide of funk." The song structure is based on a descending chord progression from E minor to D major to C major.

Pegg describes the lyrics as "opaque." He notes that authors such as Doggett and O'Leary have described the inspiration for the lyrics as the nightclub sign in John Rechy's novel City of Night while Doggett also identifies the definition of "fascination" in J. H. Brennan's book The Occult Reich as a possible topic of the lyrics. Pegg also notes that Bowie had been fascinated by the word "fascination," as evidenced by the lyrics of his 1971 song "Changes" Doggett also states that Bowie sings the song as "a celebration of male lust and power." According to music author David Buckley, "Fascination" "funks up the 'strange fascination' motif of 'Changes'" and "reaffirms a compulsion to keep doing, questing, acting, asking originally set out in 'Changes.'" O'Leary notes that one of the changes Bowie made from Vandross' original lyrics was to change a description of "a man walking down the street looking for a good song into one prowling around for a fix." Humanities professor Camille Paglia regards the lyrics as describing Bowie's "violent seizure by and enamored fascination with his own aspiring, gender-conflating mind."

== Reception ==
Allmusic critic Ned Raggett describes "Fascination" as "a dramatic and at times seriously groovy song" that "one could imagine Nile Rodgers giving an ear to in the early days of Chic." Buckley regards the song as having the best riff on Young Americans. Music professor James E. Perone praises Bowie's vocal performance as having a "great deal of emotional display" without resorting to exaggerated vibrato or having "intonation inconsistencies." Raggett notes that Bowie's vocals are "either pitched low or almost half-whispered" and speculates whether this was intentional or just the unintentional result of trying to sing in a new style, and says that this results in the backup singers being more prominent in the refrain than Bowie is. Paglia states that "Fascination" is "so passionate, powerful and grand that it can be understood as Bowie's artistic manifesto, addressed to no one but himself." New Musical Express editors Roy Carr and Charles Shaar Murray said that "Fascination" "grooves along in a fairly elegant manner."

== Personnel ==
According to Chris O'Leary and Benoît Clerc:

- David Bowie – lead vocal
- Carlos Alomar – rhythm guitar
- Mike Garson – clavinet, piano, organ
- David Sanborn – alto saxophone
- Emir Kassandra – bass guitar
- Andy Newmark or Dennis Davis – drums
- Pablo Rosario – cowbell, shaker
- Luther Vandross, Ava Cherry, Robin Clark, Geoff MacCormack, Anthony Hinton, Diane Sumler – backing vocals

Technical

- Tony Visconti – producer
- Harry Maslin, Carl Paruolo – engineer

== Cover versions ==
- Fat Larry's Band – Feel It
