= Live from Radio City Music Hall =

Live from Radio City Music Hall may refer to:

- Live at Radio City, an album and video by Dave Matthews and Tim Reynolds
- Live from Radio City Music Hall (Heaven & Hell album), an album by Heaven & Hell
- Live from Radio City Music Hall (Liza Minnelli album), an album by Liza Minnelli
- Live Radio City Music Hall 2003, an album by Luther Vandross
- Live at Radio City Music Hall, a 2015 album by Joe Bonamassa
- Live at Radio City, a 2023 live album by Bleachers.
