= Live Radio City Music Hall 2003 =

Live album by Luther Vandross
- Released: October 14, 2003
- Recorded: February 11–12, 2003
- Venue: Radio City Music Hall (New York City)
- Length: 75:29
- Label: J
- Producer: Luther Vandross; Nat Adderley Jr.; Fonzi Thornton

Luther Vandross chronology
The Essential Luther Vandross (2003)	Live Radio City Music Hall 2003 (2003)	Artist Collection: Luther Vandross (2004)

Live Radio City Music Hall 2003 is a live album by American singer Luther Vandross. It was released on October 14, 2003, by J Records. Recorded live at Radio City Music Hall in New York City on February 11 and 12, 2003, two months before Vandross' hospitalization due to a stroke, it was produced by Vandross' longtime musical director Nat Adderley, Jr. and marked his first live album. Live Radio City Music Hall 2003 debuted and peaked at number 22 on the US Billboard 200 in the week of November 5, 2003.

== Critical reception ==
Professional ratings
Review scores
Source	Rating
AllMusic	4.5/5 stars

AllMusic editor David Jeffries called the album a "welcome addition to the Luther Vandross' discography." He found that "those who have only been exposed to his smooth croon on record are in for a treat. The cool pillow talk of his studio recordings is performed perfectly here, but live Vandross adds improvisational twists, stunning vocal theatrics, and some of the most entertaining banter with an audience ever heard. Absolutely effervescent the singer wins over the audience right away and it just keeps building from there. The band is tight, with Nat Adderley Jr. as leader and on keyboards, but vocals are the thing." In a retrospective review for Medium, Mason Stoutamire wrote: "It's a series of highs and reaches even higher in the possibilities of live music. By delivering in every way, the live album successfully provides a snapshot of the vocalist’s capabilities before his passing, just two years later." He noted that "each song performed during that night is filled with potentially more soul than each respective studio version. Each track is performed perfectly."

== Chart performance ==
Live Radio City Music Hall 2003 debuted and peaked at number 22 on the US Billboard 200 in the week of November 5, 2003. It also reached number six on the Top R&B/Hip-Hop Albums chart.

== Track listing ==
Live Radio City Music Hall 2003 track listing
No.	Title	Writer(s)	Length
1.	"Never Too Much"	Vandross	4:02
2.	"Here and Now"	David L. Elliott; Terry Steele; Charles White	7:40
3.	"Take You Out"	Warryn Campbell; Harold Lilly; John Smith	4:50
4.	"Love Won't Let Me Wait"	Vinnie Barrett; Bobby Eli	7:31
5.	"Superstar"	Bonnie Bramlett; Leon Russell	12:49
6.	"Stop to Love"	Vandross; Nat Adderley Jr.	5:16
7.	"If Only for One Night"	Brenda Russell	5:58
8.	"Creepin'"	Stevie Wonder	5:46
9.	"I'd Rather"	Shep Crawford	5:28
10.	"A House Is Not a Home"	Burt Bacharach; Hal David	10:25
11.	"The Glow of Love"	David Romani; Mauro Malavasi; Wayne Garfield	5:44
Total length:			75:29

== Charts ==
Weekly chart performance for Live Radio City Music Hall 2003
Chart (2003)	Peak position
US Billboard 200	22
US Top R&B/Hip-Hop Albums (Billboard)	6
