= The Very Best of Love =

Compilation album by Luther Vandross
- Released: July 23, 2002 (US)
- Genre: R&B, soul
- Label: Madacy

Luther Vandross chronology
Stop to Love (2002)	The Very Best of Love (2002)	Dance with My Father (2003)

Professional ratings
Review scores
Source	Rating
Allmusic	3.5/5 stars

The Very Best of Love is a compilation album by American R&B/soul singer Luther Vandross, released in 2002 (see 2002 in music).

== Track listing ==
1. "Power of Love/Love Power" – 6:41
2. "Never Too Much" – 3:51
3. "Stop to Love" – 5:10
4. "Here and Now" – 5:23
5. "Endless Love" (with Mariah Carey) – 4:19
6. "Don't Want to Be a Fool" – 4:35
7. "Little Miracles (Happen Every Day)" – 4:42
8. "Any Love" – 5:01
9. "Heaven Knows" – 4:53
10. "So Amazing" – 3:39
11. "How Many Times Can We Say Goodbye" (with Dionne Warwick) – 3:26
12. "Never Let Me Go" – 4:29

== Charts ==
Chart (2003)	Peak position
U.S. Billboard Top Independent Albums	31
