= Young Americans =

1975 studio album by David Bowie

Studio album by David Bowie
- Released: 7 March 1975
- Recorded: August 1974 – January 1975
- Studios: Sigma Sound, Philadelphia; Record Plant, New York City; Electric Lady, New York City
- Genres: Blue-eyed soul; R&B; funk
- Length: 40:06
- Label: RCA Victor
- Producers: David Bowie; Harry Maslin; Tony Visconti

David Bowie chronology
David Live (1974)	Young Americans (1975)	Station to Station (1976)

Singles from Young Americans
- 1. "Young Americans" Released: 21 February 1975; 2. "Fame" Released: 2 June 1975 (US) 25 July 1975 (UK)

Young Americans is the ninth studio album by the English musician David Bowie, released on 7 March 1975 through RCA Records. A departure from the glam rock style of previous albums, the record showcased Bowie's interest in soul and R&B. Music critics have described the sound as blue-eyed soul; Bowie himself labelled the album's sound "plastic soul".

Recording sessions began at Sigma Sound Studios in Philadelphia in August 1974, after the first leg of Bowie's Diamond Dogs Tour. The record was produced by Tony Visconti, and includes a variety of musicians, such as the guitarist Carlos Alomar, who became one of Bowie's most frequent collaborators, and the backing vocalists Ava Cherry, Robin Clark and then-unknown singer Luther Vandross. As the tour continued the setlist and design began to incorporate the influence of the new material. The recording sessions continued at the Record Plant in New York City at the tour's end. A collaboration between Bowie and John Lennon yielded a cover of Lennon's Beatles song "Across the Universe" and an original, "Fame", during a January 1975 session at Electric Lady Studios, produced by Harry Maslin. The album's cover artwork is a back-lit photograph of Bowie taken by Eric Stephen Jacobs.

Young Americans was Bowie's breakthrough in the US, reaching the top 10 on the Billboard chart; "Fame" became Bowie's first single to hit number one. Bowie continued developing a similar sound on Station to Station (1976). Young Americans received mixed critical reviews on its release and in later decades; Bowie himself had mixed feelings about the album. However, the album has proved influential, as Bowie was one of the first white artists of the era to overtly engage with newly emerging black musical styles; other British artists followed suit. Young Americans has been reissued multiple times with outtakes, and was remastered in 2016 as part of the Who Can I Be Now? (1974–1976) box set.

== Background and development ==
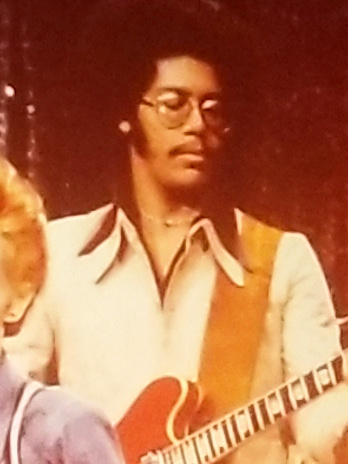
Young Americans was the beginning of Bowie's working relationship with the guitarist Carlos Alomar (pictured in 1974).

David Bowie released his eighth studio album Diamond Dogs in May 1974. His final album in the glam rock genre, it contained two songs, "Rock 'n' Roll with Me" and "1984", that exhibit elements of funk and soul, which predicted the musical direction for Bowie's next project. While his interest in soul music dated back to his mod days in the mid-1960s, he began listening to soul records extensively and incorporating soul material into his live sets. In July, towards the end of the first leg of his Diamond Dogs Tour, he performed covers of the soul songs "Knock on Wood" by Eddie Floyd and "Here Today and Gone Tomorrow" by the Ohio Players for shows in Upper Darby Township, Pennsylvania; these shows were recorded and released on the live album David Live in October 1974. (Note: This rendition of "Knock on Wood" was included on the original release of David Live and released as a single in September 1974, reaching the UK top ten. The rendition of "Here Today and Gone Tomorrow" remained unreleased until it was included on the 1990 and 2005 reissues of David Live.) Bowie had grown tired of the tour's lavish set-pieces and theatricality and was ready to fully embrace black soul music.

In early 1974, Bowie met the funk guitarist Carlos Alomar, an Apollo Theater session musician who had played with James Brown, Chuck Berry and Wilson Pickett. One of Bowie's favourite records was Brown's Live at the Apollo (1963), so meeting a musician who played at the Apollo meant a lot to him. Alomar had never heard of Bowie when they met, but they immediately connected and formed a working relationship that lasted almost 15 years; Alomar became Bowie's guide into American black music.

While in Pennsylvania, Bowie visited Sigma Sound Studios in Philadelphia to work on recordings with the American musician Ava Cherry. Sigma Sound was the home of Philadelphia soul and the favourite studio of the writer-producer duo Kenneth Gamble and Leon Huff; the two had co-founded Philadelphia International Records, the home of many well-known black American musicians. At the end of the first leg of the tour, Bowie returned to New York City to mix David Live, listening to various black albums in preparation for his return to Sigma Sound.

== Recording history ==
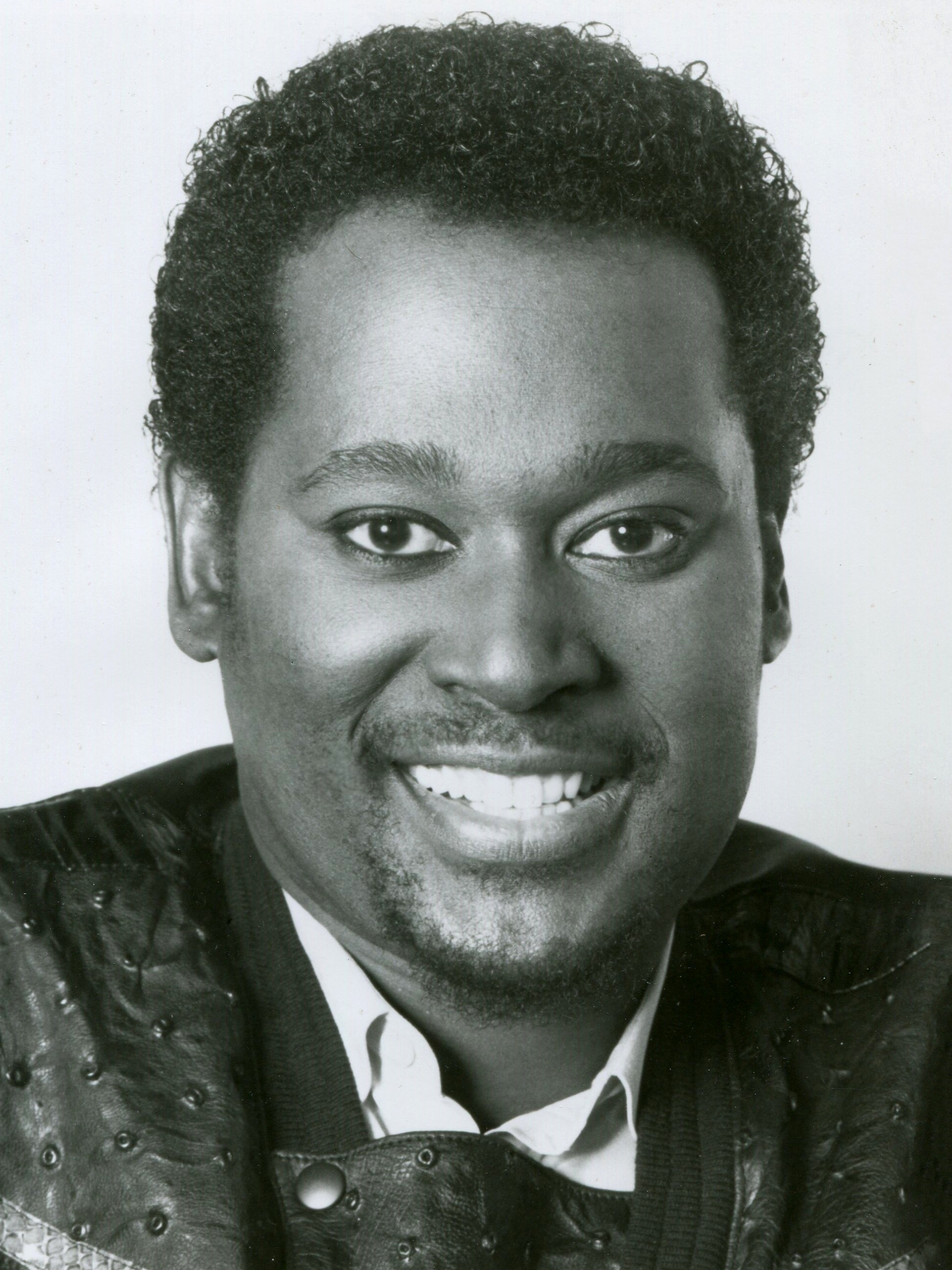
Young Americans features backing vocals from Luther Vandross (pictured in 1985), a then-unknown singer from New York City.

For the backing band, Bowie wanted to hire MFSB ("Mother Father Sister Brother"), Sigma Sound's house band of over 30 session musicians. (Note: According to Sigma Sound engineer Dirk Devlin, who worked on the earlier Ava Cherry sessions, the idea fell through due to Bowie's management company MainMan's reluctance to let the studio's in-house producers, Kenny Gamble and Leon Huff, handle (and thus own the rights to) the sessions.) Due to conflicting schedules, all members were unavailable except the percussionist Larry Washington, so Bowie went to New York City for further recruitment. Mike Garson (piano), David Sanborn (saxophone) and Pablo Rosario (percussion) were retained from the Diamond Dogs Tour, while Earl Slick was replaced by Alomar on guitar. At Alomar's suggestion, Bowie hired Andy Newmark, a former member of Sly and the Family Stone, and Willie Weeks of the Isley Brothers to replace Tony Newman and Herbie Flowers on drums and bass, respectively. The producer Tony Visconti joined the project immediately after Bowie informed him of Weeks' involvement; Visconti co-produced much of Bowie's work for the rest of the decade. Cherry, Alomar's wife Robin Clark, then-unknown singer Luther Vandross, Anthony Hinton and Diane Sumler performed backing vocals for the sessions.

=== Philadelphia sessions ===
Demo work began at Sigma Sound on 8 August 1974, with official work starting three days later on 11 August upon Visconti's arrival. Before Philadelphia, Bowie had spent most of his recording career in Britain, where recording methods were different from those in the United States. At Olympic and Trident Studios in Britain, engineers applied equalisers and reverb as they were recording, so these effects were heard upon playback. At Sigma Sound, however, the engineers applied effects during the mixing stage. Bowie was initially confounded when hearing the tapes back, as according to the biographer Chris O'Leary, he "hadn't heard his 'naked' voice on tape in years".

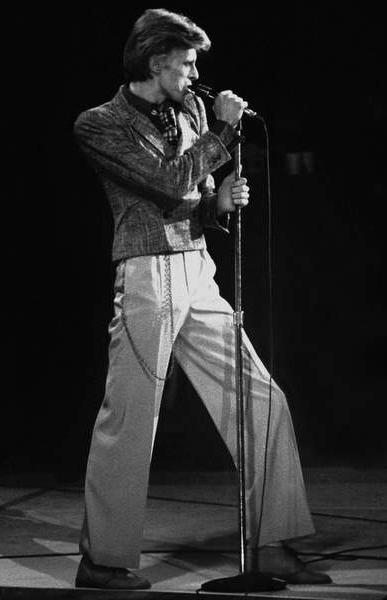
Bowie performing on the Soul Tour in late 1974.

The sessions were productive and moved rapidly, only taking two weeks to complete. It was agreed early on to record as much of the album as possible live, with the full band playing together, including Bowie's vocals, as a single continuous take for each song. According to Visconti, the album contains "about 85% 'live' David Bowie". Most of the material was built out of jam sessions. Bowie allowed the musicians to come up with ideas that he used to write lyrics and melodies.

During his time at Sigma Sound, Bowie completely immersed himself in soul music. He created a new persona called "The Gouster", a slang term for a hip street boy, which became one of the album's working titles. Visconti commented: "It wasn't so much a concept as a way of setting the tone that we were going to make a very hip album." Bowie's cocaine addiction heightened at a rapid pace during the period; he often stayed awake day and night recording while the band slept. (Note: Bowie's decaying mental state was showcased in the documentary Cracked Actor, filmed on the Diamond Dogs Tour.) Alomar said the sessions were "fuelled" by drugs, recalling: "He used drugs to keep himself awake. [I assumed] it was more a functional thing [than an addiction], so he'd be 'on' whenever the moment came to record." Bowie's cocaine use affected his voice, creating what Bowie himself called "a real raspy sound" that prevented him from singing higher notes. He believed the album contained the highest notes he ever sang on record.

The sessions produced numerous outtakes, including "After Today", "Who Can I Be Now?", "It's Gonna Be Me", a rerecording of Bowie's 1972 single "John, I'm Only Dancing" titled "John, I'm Only Dancing (Again)", "Lazer", "Shilling the Rubes", a scrapped rerecording of Bruce Springsteen's "It's Hard to Be a Saint in the City" (Note: This version of "It's Hard to Be a Saint in the City" differs from the released version on the 1990 Sound + Vision box set, and remains unreleased. Springsteen himself visited the session.) and "Too Fat Polka". After these sessions, Bowie was eager to perform the new work live. Embarking on the second half of the Diamond Dogs Tour, lasting September to December 1974, this portion is nicknamed the Soul Tour due to the influence of the new material. The shows were heavily altered and no longer featured elaborate set-pieces, due to Bowie's exhaustion with the design and wanting to explore the new sound he was creating. Songs from the previous leg were dropped, while new ones were added, including some from the upcoming album. On 2 November, Bowie appeared on The Dick Cavett Show and performed "1984", "Young Americans" and a version of the Flairs' "Footstompin'". He was inarticulate and visibly drugged during his interview.

Bowie and Visconti added overdubs and started mixing following the conclusion of the Soul Tour in November 1974. Local fans, whom Bowie referred to as the "Sigma Kids", waited outside the studio over the course of the sessions. On the final day of tracking, these fans were invited into the studio to listen to rough versions of the new songs. The album's many working titles included The Gouster, Dancin', Somebody Up There Likes Me, One Damned Song, Shilling the Rubes and Fascination. An early acetate of The Gouster provided by Visconti showed "John, I'm Only Dancing (Again)", "Who Can I Be Now?" and "It's Gonna Be Me" in the track-listing.

=== New York sessions ===
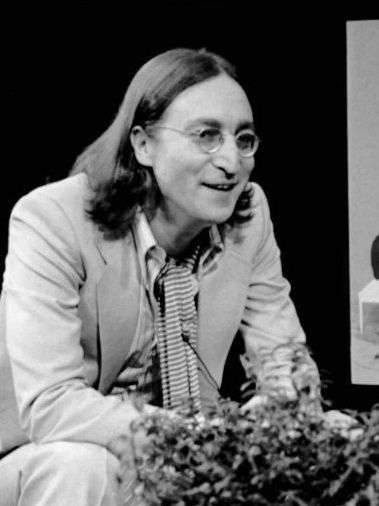
Former Beatle John Lennon (pictured in 1975) collaborated with Bowie for "Across the Universe" and "Fame".

The Soul Tour ended in December 1974, after which Bowie, Visconti and Alomar regrouped at the Record Plant in New York City to record two new songs, "Fascination" and "Win". At this point, Bowie told Disc magazine the album title was Fascination (after the newly recorded track); "John, I'm Only Dancing (Again)" was still in the track-listing and the two new tracks replaced "Who Can I Be Now?" and "Somebody Up There Likes Me". Visconti, who believed the album was completely finished, returned to London to record string arrangements for "Can You Hear Me", "Win" and "It's Gonna Be Me" at AIR Studios, while Bowie remained in New York, working on separate mixing with in-house engineer Harry Maslin.

During this time, former Beatle John Lennon was working at the Record Plant on his covers album Rock 'n' Roll (1975). Lennon, who was in what he later termed his "Lost weekend" period, had met Bowie in Los Angeles in September 1974. The two connected and decided to record together. With Alomar, the two convened at New York City's Electric Lady Studios in January 1975, recording a cover of Lennon's Beatles song "Across the Universe" and a new song, "Fame". In Visconti's absence, the session was co-produced by Bowie and Maslin. Alongside Alomar, Bowie invited Slick and the drummer Dennis Davis, making their debuts on a Bowie record, as well as the bassist Emir Ksasan from the Soul Tour band. Ralph MacDonald contributed percussion, while Jean Fineberg and Jean Millington sang backing vocals.

Mixing for Young Americans was completed at the Record Plant on 12 January 1975. Bowie contacted Visconti about the collaborations with Lennon two weeks later. Bowie was apologetic and requested the two tracks be on the final album; they replaced "Who Can I Be Now?", "It's Gonna Be Me" and "After Today". Visconti later said: "[They were] beautiful songs and it made me sick when [Bowie] decided not to use them. I think it was the personal content of the songs which he was a bit reluctant to release, although it was so obscure I don't think even I knew what he was on about in them!" The album was mastered by the engineer Greg Calbi.

== Songs ==
Young Americans presented a new musical direction for Bowie, exploring blue-eyed soul and R&B. Bowie himself labelled its sound "plastic soul", or, in the words of the author Benoît Clerc, "a pale synthetic derivative of authentic soul music". Garson later argued: "I think because he was uncertain if he was good at it, he demeaned himself by calling it plastic soul." Other writers have classified it "sax-y white soul" and white soul music. Ashley Naftule of Consequence of Sound described the album as a cross between Bowie's "artsy rocker tendencies" and the "warm earnestness" of soul and R&B. According to BBC Music's Daryl Easlea, lyrical themes throughout the album include loneliness, despair and alienation, although the biographer Christopher Sandford writes that the album is "a record of high spirits and lively, colliding ideas". One of Bowie's major inspirations when writing the album was Aretha Franklin.

=== Side one ===
"Young Americans" opens the album, which Bowie said was about "a newly-wed couple who don't know if they really like each other". The song also presents new lyrical directions for the artist: instead of "shady" characters living in worlds fraught with darkness, "Young Americans" shows typical American teenagers. References are made to McCarthyism and the resignation of president Richard Nixon, which occurred a week before the recording sessions began. The line "I heard the news today, oh boy" was taken from the Beatles' song "A Day in the Life" (1967), acknowledging Lennon's influence on Bowie and their imminent collaboration later on the album. The author Peter Doggett writes that the song introduced the world to an entirely new Bowie, catching everyone by surprise. Bowie said "Win" was about people who "don't work very hard". According to the author James E. Perone, the lyrics are more abstract than the previous track and are open to interpretation. Saxophones and strings feature throughout, while the backing vocalists are more relaxed and in line with Bowie's lead.

"Fascination" evolved out of a Vandross track titled "Funky Music (Is a Part of Me)", which Bowie added new lyrics to. Bowie kept most of Vandross' structure but changed the interplay of the backing vocalists. (Note: Vandross released his own version of "Funky Music (Is a Part of Me)" on his album Luther (1976).) Doggett cites elements in the novels City of Night (1963) and The Occult Reich (1974) as inspirations for the title, while David Buckley writes that it reaffirms the 'strange fascination' motif of Bowie's track "Changes" (1971). "Right" is the only track on Young Americans to feature Bowie's old friend Geoff MacCormack. The call and response between Bowie and the backing singers "lends an air of immaculate sophistication to the lyric's paean to positive thinking", according to the biographer Nicholas Pegg. In 1975, Bowie called the song a mantra: "People forget what the sound of Man's instinct is—it's a drone, a mantra. And people say, 'Why are so many things popular that just drone on and on?' But that's the point really. It reaches a particular vibration, not necessarily a musical level." Bowie, Vandross, Clark and Cherry can be seen rehearsing the song in the BBC documentary Cracked Actor (1975).

=== Side two ===
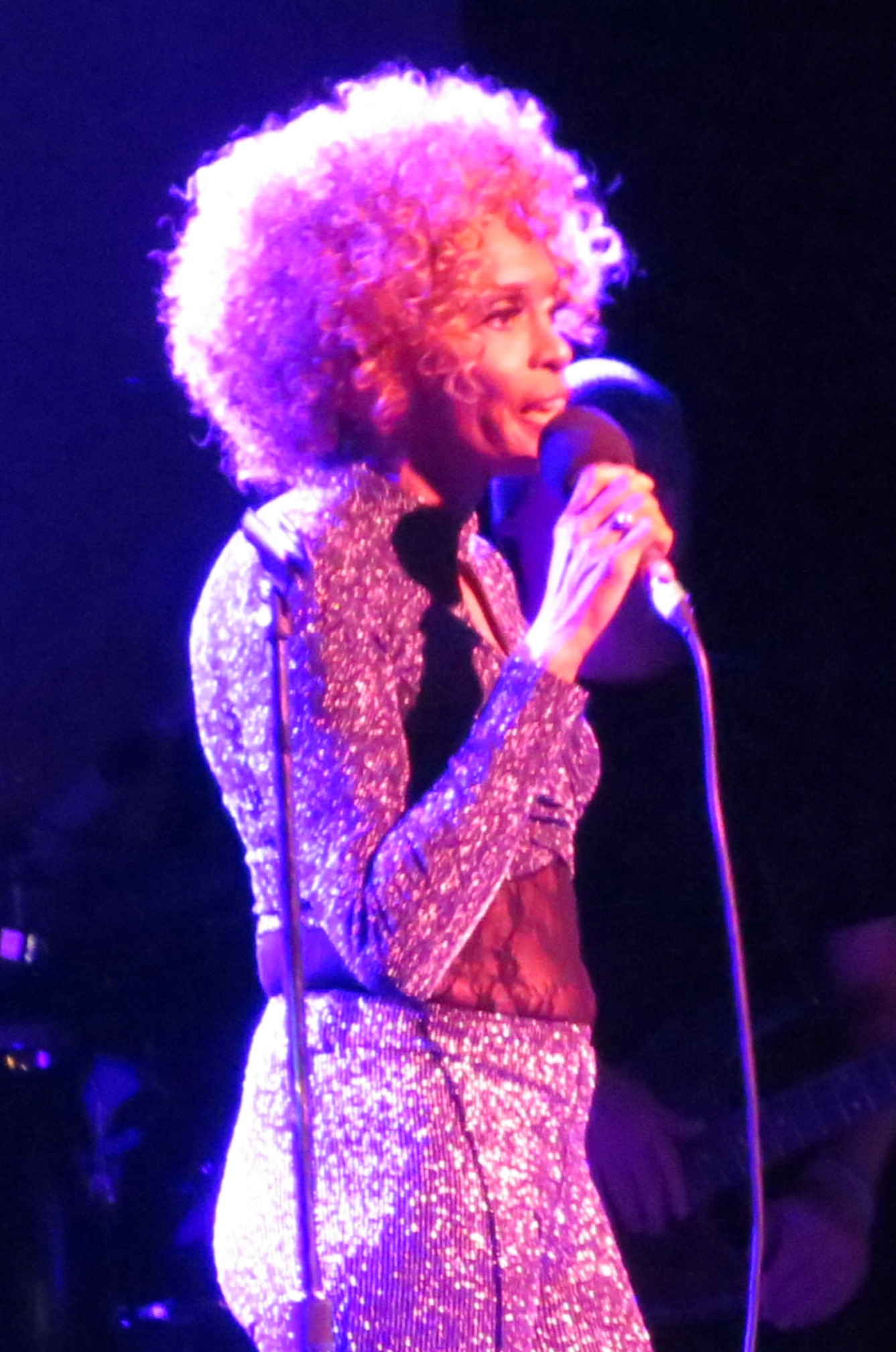
The singer Ava Cherry (pictured in 2016) sang backing vocals throughout the album. She is also the supposed inspiration for "Can You Hear Me?"

The title of "Somebody Up There Likes Me" was taken from the 1956 film of the same name. Similar to "Right", it uses a call-and-response structure and is embellished in strings, saxophone and synthesisers that hide dark lyrics. Pegg states that the lyrics discuss the idea of celebrity and the "hollowness of fame and adulation". Bowie himself described the song as a "Watch out mate, Hitler's on your back" warning. Bowie's rendition of "Across the Universe" is a blue-eyed soul reworking that features Lennon on guitar and backing vocals. Bowie had previously called the Beatles' original version "very watery" and wanted to "hammer the hell out of it". His cover has been maligned by critics and biographers. Perone argues that it succeeds as a "groove piece".

"Can You Hear Me?", originally "Take It in Right", is described by O'Leary as contemporary R&B, while Doggett believes its style is more reminiscent of southern music rather than Philly soul. Perone likens Bowie's vocal performance to the singer Al Green. In 1975, Bowie stated that the song was "written for somebody" but declined to disclose who; his biographers agree that it was most likely for Cherry.

"Fame" is a funk rock song that represents Bowie and Lennon's dissatisfaction with the troubles of fame and stardom. Alomar originally developed the guitar riff for Bowie's cover of "Footstompin'", which Bowie then used to create "Fame". Lennon's voice is heard interjecting the falsetto "Fame" throughout the song. Bowie later said that Lennon was the "energy" and the "inspiration" for "Fame", which is why he received a writing credit; O'Leary states that Lennon wrote the song's intro chord progression. In 1980, Lennon stated: "We took some Stevie Wonder middle eight and did it backwards, you know, and we made a record out of it!"

=== Outtakes ===
"Who Can I Be Now?" reflects the theme of self-identity. Over its runtime, it builds to a what Pegg calls a "gospel-choir climax". Doggett writes that its title summarises Bowie's career up to this point, sharing a similar theme as "Changes". "It's Gonna Be Me" is a ballad similar in style to Aretha Franklin. Originally titled "Come Back My Baby", it is lyrically similar to "Can You Hear Me?", in that it follows a casual seducer who realises the error of his ways and works to redeem himself. Pegg and Doggett praised the track as one of the most overlooked gems of Bowie's entire career. "John, I'm Only Dancing (Again)" is a radical seven-minute funk and disco reworking of Bowie's 1972 glam rock single "John, I'm Only Dancing". This new version mostly retains the original's chorus, but with new verses and an entirely different melody. It was released as a single in 1979. "After Today" is a soul-disco song with a falsetto vocal from Bowie and less polished production compared to other album tracks. (Note: This version was released on the 1989 Sound + Vision box set. A faster, alternate take, dated 13 August 1974, later leaked online in 2009.)

== Artwork ==
For the album cover art, Bowie initially wanted to commission Norman Rockwell to create a painting but retracted the offer upon learning Rockwell needed at least six months to do the job. According to Pegg, another rejected idea was a full-length portrait of Bowie in a "flying suit" and white scarf, standing in front of an American flag and raising a glass. The final cover photo, a back-lit and airbrushed photo of Bowie, was taken in Los Angeles on 30 August 1974 by the photographer Eric Stephen Jacobs. Jacobs took inspiration from a similar photo he took of the choreographer Toni Basil for the September 1974 cover of After Dark magazine. Using that photo, Craig DeCamps designed the final cover at RCA Records' New York City office. Sandford calls it one of the "classic" album covers.

== Release ==
RCA released "Young Americans" as the lead single to the album on 21 February 1975, with the Ziggy Stardust track "Suffragette City" (1972) as the B-side. In the US, it was released in edited form, omitting two verses and a chorus; its B-side was the 1974 live cover of "Knock on Wood". It reached number 18 on the UK Singles Chart and number 28 on the Billboard Hot 100, his second top 40 entry and second-highest chart peak in the US up to that point. Bowie's November 1974 performance of the song on The Dick Cavett Show was used as promotion, airing on the BBC's Top of the Pops on 21 February 1975.

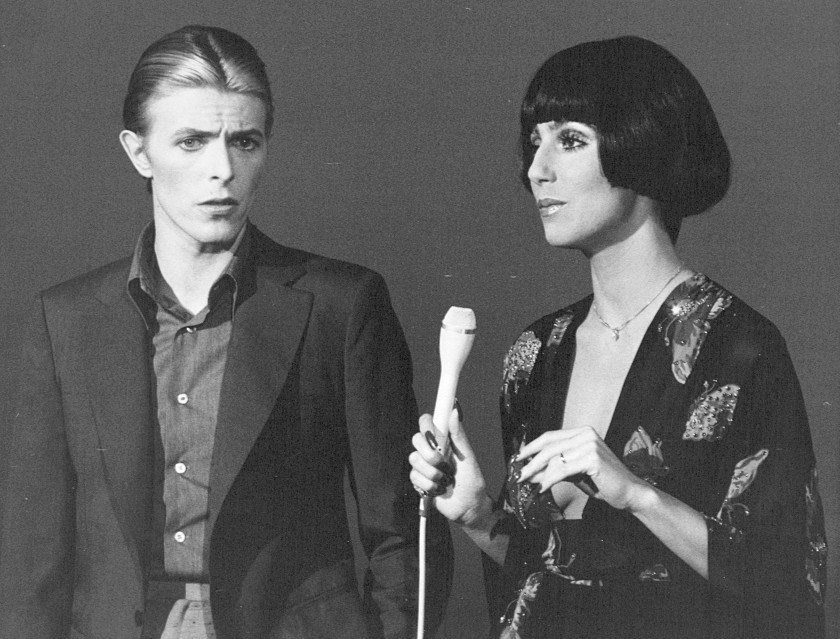
Bowie with Cher on her self-titled variety show in November 1975. He sang "Fame" and "Can You Hear Me?" on the show.

Young Americans was released in the UK on 7 March 1975, and in early April in the US. It reached number nine on the US Billboard Top LPs & Tape chart and remained on the chart for 51 weeks; by July, it was certified gold by the Recording Industry Association of America (RIAA). It stayed on the UK Albums Chart for 17 weeks, peaking at number two, being kept off the top spot by Tom Jones's 20 Greatest Hits. Elsewhere, Young Americans reached the top five in New Zealand and Sweden, the top ten in Australia and Finland, number 12 in France, 13 in Norway, 17 in Canada and 82 in Japan. According to Buckley, sales were lower than Diamond Dogs overall.

The second single "Fame" was released on 2 June in the US and on 25 July in the UK, with the album track "Right" as the B-side. Although it only reached number 17 in the UK, "Fame" topped the charts in the US. Its chart success was a surprise to Bowie, who recalled in 1990: "Even though [Lennon] had contributed to it and everything, and I had no idea, as with 'Let's Dance', that that was what a commercial single is. I haven't got a clue when it comes to singles. ... I don't get it, and 'Fame' was really out of left-field for me." In early November, he became one of the first white artists to appear on ABC TV's Soul Train, where he gave mimed performances of "Fame" and his new single "Golden Years". He then sang "Fame" and "Can You Hear Me?" live on the CBS variety show Cher a few weeks later.

== Critical reception ==
Professional ratings
Initial reviews
Review scores
Source	Rating
The Gazette	B
The Village Voice	C+

Young Americans was released to a generally favorable reception, particularly in America. Billboard predicted that the album would please Bowie's current fans and open him up to new ones. Record World called it Bowie's "most compelling album to date"; Crawdaddy's Michael Gross said it was his best studio record since Ziggy Stardust, while Cashbox praised Bowie as an artist. In their end-of-year list, NME ranked Young Americans the seventh best album of 1975.

Amongst mixed reviews, some enjoyed certain tracks but disregarded the collection as a whole. Rolling Stone's Jon Landau praised the title track and thought that the remainder of the album "works best when Bowie combines his renewed interest in soul with his knowledge of English pop, rather than opting entirely for one or the other". Ray Fox-Cumming of Record Mirror described the sound as "spasmodic, awkward, frustrating" and having "a joyless energy". In The Philadelphia Inquirer, Jack Lloyd called Young Americans a "gem" and a "triumph" filled with "superb" songs aside from the "pretentious" title track, but felt "Across the Universe" and "Fame" were out of place.

Several critics were negative. In The Village Voice, Robert Christgau initially gave the record a C+ called the record "an almost total failure", saying that "although the amalgam of rock and Philly soul is so thin it's interesting, it overwhelms David's voice, which is even thinner". He nonetheless appreciated Bowie's renewed "generosity of spirit to risk failure" following the disappointments of Diamond Dogs and David Live. He later amended his review to B−, describing "Young Americans" and "Fame" as the album's "two successes". In Phonograph Record, John Mendelsohn criticised the lyrics, Bowie's vocal performance, found the melodies "as good as non-existent" and the overall album very weak. In the NME, Ian MacDonald felt the record was more of a transitional one, created out of a confused state of mind not knowing where to take his career next. He enjoyed it despite its flaws. In Melody Maker, Michael Watts praised the backing band but found the record too "pastiche" to be credible and Bowie's worst release up to that point. In Canada, Bill Man of The Gazette was also disappointed, believing Bowie should "focus his talents more directly".

== Legacy ==
=== Subsequent events ===
Bowie continued developing the funk and soul of Young Americans, with electronic and German krautrock influences, for his next studio album, Station to Station. Produced by Harry Maslin, the album was recorded in Los Angeles from September to November 1975 and released in January 1976. Songs from the Young Americans period that foreshadowed the album's direction included "Win", "Can You Hear Me?" and "Who Can I Be Now?" Station to Station continued Bowie's run of commercial success, reaching number three in the US. However, his cocaine use continued throughout 1975, to the extent he had almost no recollection of recording Station to Station. After completing the Isolar Tour in May 1976, he moved to Europe to rid himself of his drug addiction.

Commentators have acknowledged Young Americans as Bowie's first album that he performed as himself rather than as a persona. Sandford believed that Bowie showed maturity by not featuring Ziggy Stardust, which secured his breakthrough into the US market. Pegg says the album turned Bowie from "a mildly unsavoury cult artist to a chat-show friendly showbiz personality" in the US. Bowie, however, expressed varying statements about the album throughout his lifetime. In late 1975, he described it as "the phoniest R&B I've ever heard. If I ever would have got my hands on that record when I was growing up I would have cracked it over my knee." He further described it as "a phase" in a 1976 interview with Melody Maker. He later reversed his stance in 1990, telling Q magazine: "I shouldn't have been quite so hard on myself, because looking back it was pretty good white, blue-eyed soul [and] it was quite definitely one of the best bands I ever had."

=== Influence ===
Young Americans has been called one of Bowie's most influential records. With the album, Bowie was one of the first mainstream white artists to embrace black musical styles, paving the way for other artists to engage in similar styles. Daryl Easlea summarised in Record Collector: "While all rock'n'roll was based on white men's appropriation of black popular music, very few artists had embraced the form wholesale, to the point of using the same studios and musicians, as Bowie [did]." Buckley commented that it brought fans of both glam rock and soul together in the wake of the disco era. In subsequent years, artists who experimented with funk and soul after Bowie included Elton John, Roxy Music, Rod Stewart, the Rolling Stones, Bee Gees, Talking Heads, Spandau Ballet, Japan and ABC. Bowie was also referenced directly by George Clinton in the Parliament song "P. Funk (Wants to Get Funked Up)" (1976) and in the film Saturday Night Fever (1977). Clinton also used a modified version of the "Fame" instrumental for Parliament's "Give Up the Funk (Tear the Roof off the Sucker)" (1976), while James Brown used "Fame"'s riff verbatim for "Hot (I Need to Be Loved, Loved, Loved)" (1975). In 2016, Joe Lynch of Billboard argued that "Fame" and Young Americans as a whole served as an influence not only on other funk artists such as Clinton but also early hip hop artists and the West Coast G-funk genre of the early 1990s.

=== Retrospective reviews ===
Professional ratings
Retrospective professional ratings
Review scores
Source	Rating
AllMusic	3.5/5 stars
Chicago Tribune	3.5/4 stars
Christgau's Record Guide	B−
The Encyclopedia of Popular Music	4/5 stars
New Musical Express	7/10
Pitchfork	8.7/10
The Rolling Stone Album Guide	3/5 stars
Select	5/5
Spin Alternative Record Guide	6/10
Uncut	4/5 stars

In later decades, Young Americans has been dismissed as a purely transitional record and an inauthentic excursion by an artist whose talents lay elsewhere. Others have criticised it for being inconsistent, and lacking strong songwriting and the musical cohesiveness of Bowie's other 1970s albums. Douglas Wolk stated in Pitchfork: "It doesn't have the mad theatrical scope of Diamond Dogs or the formal audacity of Station to Station; at times, it comes off as an artist trying very hard to demonstrate how unpredictable he is." Stephen Thomas Erlewine of AllMusic said that Young Americans is "more enjoyable as a stylistic adventure than as a substantive record".

Some critics have viewed Young Americans as an overlooked album that occupies a troubled place in Bowie's discography, being sequenced between Bowie's Ziggy and Thin White Duke periods. Rob Sheffield opined that the album is "easy to overlook" because Bowie "did most of these robot-soul space-funk tricks better two years later on Station to Station". Mark Beaumont of The Independent argued: "Those rock historians who dismiss the album as a white elephant among Bowie's 1970s output [...] underestimate its significance. Because this was Bowie's first display of true fearlessness, rock's most celebrated shape-shifter attempting his first real post-fame metamorphosis." Others agree that Young Americans deserves a spot in Bowie's discography. Positive reviews of the album say that it has aged well, even being considered by some as a masterpiece of white soul. In 1991, Jon Wilde of Melody Maker argued that, like Bowie's other 1970s records, Young Americans was ahead of its time. The singer Bob Geldof said: "Young Americans is a fantastic soul record, but soul with something else going on. There's an edginess to it."

Young Americans was voted Bowie's ninth best album in a 2013 readers' poll for Rolling Stone. The magazine argued that its style shift helped introduce Bowie to a wider audience. That same year, NME ranked the album at number 175 in its list of the 500 Greatest Albums of All Time. It was voted number 481 in the third edition of Colin Larkin's All Time Top 1000 Albums. In 2004, the critic Charles Shaar Murray voted it the 88th best British album in a list for The Observer. The album was also included in the 2018 edition of Robert Dimery's book 1001 Albums You Must Hear Before You Die.

== Reissues ==
Professional ratings
2007 reissue
Review scores
Source	Rating
Goldmine	5/5 stars
Rolling Stone	4/5 stars

RCA Records first reissued Young Americans on compact disc in 1984. The second reissue of the album was by Rykodisc/EMI in 1991, with three bonus tracks. The reissue charted at number 54 on the UK Albums Chart for one week in April 1991. A 1999 edition on EMI featured 24-bit digitally remastered sound and no extra tracks. The 2007 reissue, marketed as a "Special Edition", included an accompanying DVD containing 5.1 surround sound mixes of the album and Bowie's November 1974 interview and performances on The Dick Cavett Show. In 2016, the album was remastered for the Who Can I Be Now? (1974–1976) box set, which also includes an earlier, rawer-sounding draft of the album, titled The Gouster. It was released in CD, vinyl, and digital formats, both as part of this compilation and separately. On 7 March 2025, Young Americans was reissued as a half-speed mastered LP and a picture disc for its 50th anniversary.

The 1991 and 2007 reissues featured "Who Can I Be Now?", "John, I'm Only Dancing (Again)" and "It's Gonna Be Me" as bonus tracks; the latter was released in an alternate version with strings on the 2007 edition. The 1991 reissue replaced the original versions of "Win", "Fascination" and "Right" with alternate mixes, but later reissues restored the original mixes. Another outtake, "After Today", appeared on the 1989 box set Sound + Vision, as did the alternate mix of "Fascination".

== Track listing ==
All tracks are written by David Bowie, except where noted.

Side one
No.	Title	Writer(s)	Length
1.	"Young Americans"		5:10
2.	"Win"		4:44
3.	"Fascination"	Bowie, Luther Vandross	5:43
4.	"Right"		4:13
Total length:			19:50

Side two
No.	Title	Writer(s)	Length
1.	"Somebody Up There Likes Me"		6:30
2.	"Across the Universe"	John Lennon, Paul McCartney	4:30
3.	"Can You Hear Me?"		5:04
4.	"Fame"	Bowie, Carlos Alomar, Lennon	4:12
Total length:			20:16 40:06

1991 CD bonus tracks
No.	Title	Length
9.	"Who Can I Be Now?" (previously unreleased)	4:36
10.	"It's Gonna Be Me" (previously unreleased)	6:27
11.	"John, I'm Only Dancing (Again)" (1974 single A-side)	6:57
Total length:		58:06

== Personnel ==
According to the liner notes and the biographer Nicholas Pegg, except where noted.

Primary musicians

- David Bowie – vocals, guitar, keyboards
- Carlos Alomar – guitars
- Mike Garson – piano, clavinet ("Fascination" and "Right")
- David Sanborn – saxophone
- Willie Weeks – bass guitar (all tracks except "Across the Universe" and "Fame")
- Andy Newmark – drums (all tracks except "Across the Universe" and "Fame")
- Earl Slick – guitars

Additional musicians

- Larry Washington – congas
- Ava Cherry – backing vocals
- Robin Clark – backing vocals
- Luther Vandross – backing vocals, vocal arrangements
- Anthony Hinton – backing vocals
- Diane Sumler – backing vocals
- Tony Visconti – string arrangements
- Pablo Rosario – percussion ("Across the Universe" and "Fame")
- John Lennon – vocals, guitar, backing vocals ("Across the Universe" and "Fame")
- Emir Ksasan – bass guitar ("Across the Universe" and "Fame")
- Dennis Davis – drums ("Across the Universe" and "Fame")
- Ralph MacDonald – percussion ("Across the Universe" and "Fame")
- Jean Fineberg – backing vocals ("Across the Universe" and "Fame")
- Jean Millington – backing vocals ("Across the Universe" and "Fame")

Technical

- David Bowie – producer
- Tony Visconti – producer, mixer
- Harry Maslin – producer, mixer, engineer (Record Plant)
- Carl Parulow – engineer (Sigma Sound)
- Mike Hutchinson – tape operator (Sigma Sound)
- Eddie Kramer – engineer (Electric Lady)
- David Whitman – tape operator (Electric Lady)
- Kevin Herron – tape operator (Record Plant)
- David Thoener – tape operator (Record Plant)
- Greg Calbi – mastering engineer
- Eric Stephen Jacobs (Note: Credited in the 1975 liner notes as Eric Stephen.) – cover photograph
- Craig DeCamps – cover design

== Charts and certifications ==
=== Weekly charts ===
1975 weekly chart performance for Young Americans
Chart (1975)	Peak Position
Australian Albums (Kent Music Report)	9
Canadian Albums (RPM)	17
Denmark (Årets Singlehitliste)	1
Finnish Albums (Suomen virallinen lista)	8
French Albums (SNEP)	12
Japanese Albums (Oricon)	82
New Zealand Albums (RMNZ)	3
Norwegian Albums (VG-lista)	13
Swedish Albums (Sverigetopplistan)	5
UK Albums (OCC)	2
US Billboard Top LPs & Tape	9

1991 weekly chart performance for Young Americans
Chart (1991)	Peak Position
UK Albums (OCC)	54

2016 weekly chart performance for Young Americans
Chart (2016)	Peak Position
Italian Albums (FIMI)	92
Swiss Albums (Schweizer Hitparade)	92

2025 weekly chart performance for Young Americans
Chart (2025)	Peak Position
Hungarian Albums (MAHASZ)	36

=== Year-end charts ===
1975 year-end chart performance for Young Americans
Chart (1975)	Position
Australian Albums (Kent Music Report)	44
US Billboard Top LPs & Tape	20

=== Certifications ===
Certifications for Young Americans
Region	Certification	Certified units/sales
Canada (Music Canada)	Gold	50,000^{^}
United Kingdom (BPI)	Gold	100,000^{‡}
United States (RIAA)	Gold	500,000^{^}
Summaries
Worldwide	—	3,300,000
^{^} Shipments figures based on certification alone.^{‡} Sales+streaming figures based on certification alone.
