= This Close to You =

Studio album by Luther
- Released: March 23, 1977 (U.S.)
- Recorded: 1976, 1977
- Studio: Atlantic (New York City)
- Genre: Soul, disco, funk
- Label: Cotillion, Atlantic
- Producer: Luther Vandross

Luther chronology
Luther (1976)	This Close to You (1977)

This Close to You is the second studio album by American recording artist group Luther, released on March 23, 1977. It is the follow-up to the group's self-titled debut album Luther. Luther Vandross performs the lead vocals on the majority of the album, also as writer and producer. This Close to You was the group’s final album, and by 1980 Vandross signed a solo deal with Epic Records, leading to the release of his debut album Never Too Much in 1981. After achieving R&B/pop music success, Vandross bought back the rights to both Luther and This Close to You albums preventing a later re-issue after the record label dropped the group due to low sales. It was re-released June 7, 2024 by Legacy Recordings.

Professional ratings
Review scores
Source	Rating
Allmusic	4/5 stars

== Track listing ==
All tracks are written by Luther Vandross.

No.	Title	Length
1.	"This is for Real"	4:08
2.	"A Lover’s Change"	2:58
3.	"Don’t Take the Time"	5:18
4.	"Jealousy in Me"	4:32
5.	"I’m Not Satisfied"	4:43
6.	"This Close to You"	3:30
7.	"Don’t Wanna Be a Fool"	3:18
8.	"Come Back to Love"	5:08
9.	"Follow My Love"	5:11
Total length:		38:46

== Personnel ==
- Luther Vandross, Anthony Hinton – lead vocals
- Diane Sumler – vocals
- Wilbur Bascomb, Will Lee – bass
- Pablo Rosario – congas
- Rick Marotta, Dennis Davis – drums
- Michael Pomier – percussion, congas
- Fred Gripper – electric piano
- Jeff Mironov, Nile Rodgers, Cornell Dupree – guitar
- Nathaniel Edward Adderley, Don Grolnick – piano, keyboards
- George Young II – soprano saxophone
- David A. Friedman – vibraphone, bells
- Paul Riser – arrangements
- Alfred Brown – string and horn contractor
- David Krevat – executive producer

== Singles ==
Year	Title	Peak positions
Year	Title	US R&B
1977	"This Close to You"	93
