= Stop to Love =

Compilation album by Luther Vandross
- Released: April 1, 2002 (US)
- Genre: R&B, soul
- Label: Sony Music Special Products
- Producer: Jeffrey James (compilation producer)

Luther Vandross chronology
The Ultimate Luther Vandross (2001)	Stop to Love (2002)	The Very Best of Love (2002)

Stop to Love is a compilation album by American R&B/soul singer Luther Vandross, released in 2002.

Professional ratings
Review scores
Source	Rating
Allmusic	link

== Track listing ==
1. "The Glow of Love" (Change featuring Luther Vandross) - 6:12
2. "I Can't Wait No Longer (Let's Do This)" (Featuring Deidra "Spin" Roper) - 5:38
3. "Ain't No Stoppin' Us Now" - 4:53
4. "Give Me the Reason" - 4:45
5. "Lady, Lady" - 5:33
6. "Never Too Much" - 3:51
7. "I Can Tell You That" - 5:25
8. "Heaven Knows" - 5:01
9. "The Rush" - 6:45
10. "Stop to Love" - 5:10
