= Luther (album) =

Studio album by Luther
- Released: June 1976 (U.S.)
- Recorded: 1975–1976
- Studio: Atlantic, New York City; Sigma Sound, Philadelphia
- Genre: Soul, disco, funk
- Length: 37:27
- Label: Cotillion, Atlantic
- Producer: Luther Vandross

Luther chronology
Luther (1976)	This Close to You (1977)

Luther is the debut album by American recording artist group Luther, released in May 1976. The album features Luther Vandross with members Anthony Hinton, Diane Sumler, Theresa V. Reed, and Christine Wiltshire.

"It's Good for the Soul", "Funky Music (Is a Part of Me)" and "The 2nd Time Around" were released as singles, but the album failed to chart. Vandross bought back the rights to the album after the record label dropped the group, preventing its later re-release. It was re-released April 19, 2024 by Legacy Recordings.

The song "The 2nd Time Around" was later re-recorded also titled "The Second Time Around" in the closing track on his 1988 album Any Love.

Professional ratings
Review scores
Source	Rating
Allmusic	4/5 stars

== Track listing ==
No.	Title	Writer(s)	Length
1.	"Funky Music (Is a Part of Me)"	Luther Vandross	5:29
2.	"The 2nd Time Around"	Vandross	6:25
3.	"I'll Get Along Fine"	Vandross	4:07
4.	"Everybody Rejoice"	Vandross	3:22
5.	"Emotion Eyes"	Vandross	5:58
6.	"This Strange Feeling"	Vandross	4:44
7.	"It's Good for the Soul (Parts I & II)"	Vandross	8:42

Notes

- Track 4: "Everybody Rejoice" is from the Tony Award 7x Winning (including Best Broadway Musical), The Wiz (1975).

== Personnel ==
- George Murray, Wilbur Bascomb - bass
- Andy Newmark, Darryl Brown, Andrew Smith - drums
- Carlos Alomar, Jeff Mironov, Jerry Friedman, Lance Quinn - guitar
- Nat Adderley, Jr., Pat Rebillot - keyboards
- Anthony Hinton, Luther Vandross - lead vocals
- Pablo Rosario, David Friedman - percussion
- George Young - soprano saxophone
- Paul Riser - arrangements
- Gene Orloff - concertmaster
- Alfred Brown - contractor (strings & horns)
- Executive Producer – David Krevat, Ceilidh Productions, Inc.
- Producer, Written-By – Luther Vandross
- Anthony Hinton, Christine Wiltshire, Diane Sumler, Luther Vandross, Theresa V. Reed - backing vocals
- Album cover design - Abie Sussman - Nick Fasciano - construction - Gerard Huerta - lettering.

== Charts ==
=== Singles ===
Year	Single	Chart positions	
Year	Single	US Pop	US R&B
1976	"It's Good for the Soul (Pt. 1)"	102	28
1976	"Funky Music (Is a Part of Me)" (A-side)	—	34
1976	"The 2nd Time Around" (B-side)	—	34
