= Josh Thompson =

Josh Thompson may refer to:

- Josh Thompson (gridiron football) (born 1985), American football defensive tackle
- Josh Thompson (defensive back) (born 1998), American football cornerback
- Josh Thompson (biathlete) (born 1962), retired American biathlete and pilot
- Josh Thompson (footballer) (born 1991), English footballer
- Josh Thompson (singer) (born 1978), American country music artist
- Josh Thompson (runner) (born 1993), American runner
- Josh Thompson (rugby union) (born 2000), Fijian rugby union player
- Josh Thompson (offensive lineman) (born 2002), American football guard
- Josh Robert Thompson (born 1975), American actor, impressionist and comedian
- Joshua Spencer Thompson (1828–1880), Canadian journalist and politician

== See also ==
- Josh Thomson (born 1978), American MMA fighter
- Josh Thomson (actor) (born 1981), New Zealand actor and comedian
