= Nights in Harlem =

Single by Luther Vandross

from the album I Know
- Released: July 14, 1998
- Genre: R&B
- Length: 4:57
- Label: Virgin
- Songwriters: Vandross; Fonzi Thornton; Rex Rideout
- Producer: Luther Vandross

Luther Vandross singles chronology
"I Can Make It Better" (1996)	"Nights in Harlem" (1998)	"I Know" (1998)

"Nights in Harlem" is a song by American recording artist Luther Vandross, released July 14, 1998. It was written by Vandross along with Fonzi Thornton and Rex Rideout for his eleventh studio album I Know (1998). The uptempo song served as the album's lead single. Following its release, it peaked number 4 on Billboard's Adult R&B Songs.

A "Darkchild remix" version appears as the final track on I Know.

== Critical reception ==
Larry Flick of Billboard wrote, "Vandross christens his new alliance with Virgin with a lively jam that firmly reminds programmers how cool soul music is really made. Seamlessly produced by the artist, "Nights In Harlem" chugs with an old-school, funk juiced flavor that takes the listener back to the days when music was made, not sampled. A rap cameo by Precise keeps "Nights In Harlem" on a jeep-smart path, though this track hardly needs it. The combo platter of blissfully nostalgic lyrics and a top-form performance from Vandross is enough to render this an instant R&B radio smash. Popsters should pay close attention, too. After all, no one can live solely on kiddie pop."

== Track listing ==
US CD Single (Promo)

1. "Nights In Harlem" feat. Precise (LP Edit)
2. "Nights In Harlem" feat. Guru (A Darkchild Remix Edit)
3. "Nights In Harlem" (LP Edit W/O Rap)
4. "Nights In Harlem" (A Darkchild Remix Edit W/O Rap)
5. "Nights In Harlem" feat. Guru (A Darkchild Extended Remix)

UK Vinyl 12" Single

1. A1 "Nights In Harlem" (Darkchild Extended Remix)-5:25
2. A2 "Nights In Harlem" (Darkchild Remix Edit)-4:09
3. B1 "Nights In Harlem" (Darkchild Instrumental)-4:23
4. B2 "Nights In Harlem" (LP Edit)-4:36

== Personnel ==
- Luther Vandross – lead vocals, arrangements, vocal arrangements
- John "Skip" Anderson – keyboards, bass, drum programming
- Paul Jackson Jr. – electric guitar
- Max Risenhoover – sound design, digital editing
- Rex Rideout – keyboards, arrangements
- Ali Shaheed Muhammad – turntables
- Fonzi Thornton – arrangements
- Cindy Mizelle, Paulette McWilliams, Tawatha Agee, Brenda White-King – background vocals

== Charts ==
Chart (1998)	Peak position
US Adult R&B Songs (Billboard)	4
