= Can Heaven Wait =

Single by Luther Vandross

from the album Luther Vandross
- Released: December 2001
- Length: 5:35
- Label: J
- Songwriters: Carsten Shack; Kenneth Karlin; Quincy Patrick; Danny Mercado; Joshua Thompson; Joe Thomas
- Producer: Soulshock & Karlin

Luther Vandross singles chronology
"Take You Out" (2001)	"Can Heaven Wait" (2001)	"I'd Rather" (2002)

"Can Heaven Wait" is a song by American singer-songwriter Luther Vandross. It was written by Carsten Shack, Kenneth Karlin, Quincy Patrick, Joshua Thompson, Danny Mercado, and Joe Thomas for his self-titled twelfth studio album (2001), with production helmed by Shack and Karlin under their production moniker Soulshock & Karlin. The song was released as the album's second single.

== Track listing ==
US CD Single

No.	Title	Length
1.	"Can Heaven Wait" (Radio Edit)	4:15
2.	"Can Heaven Wait" (Instrumental)	5:09
3.	"Can Heaven Wait" (Call Out Hook)	0:10

== Charts ==
Chart (2001)	Peak position
US Dance Club Songs (Billboard)	3
US Hot R&B/Hip-Hop Songs (Billboard)	63
