= I Know (Luther Vandross song) =

Single by Luther Vandross

from the album I Know
- Released: 1998
- Recorded: 1997
- Genre: R&B; soul
- Length: 3:58
- Label: Virgin
- Songwriter(s): Luther Vandross; Reed Vertelney
- Producer(s): Luther Vandross

Luther Vandross singles chronology
"Nights in Harlem" (1998)	"I Know" (1998)	"Take You Out" (2001)

"I Know" is a 1998 song by American recording R&B/soul artist Luther Vandross. The single was released in support of his album of the same name. The single reached its lowest peak at number sixty-one on the Billboard's Hot R&B Singles. The song also features singer Stevie Wonder on harmonica.

== Critical reception ==
Larry Flick of Billboard wrote, "Unfortunately, the previous "Nights In Harlem" didn't go as far as it should have, but the future is bright for the title cut from Vandross' first Virgin Records release. R&B radio programmers should find comfort in the warm familiarity of this sweet ballad, which allows the beloved singer to flex his distinctive voice to maximum effect. Vandross sounds downright blissful moving through an arrangement that sews delicate acoustic guitar riffs and an instantly recognizable harmonica solo by Stevie Wonder into a languid rhythm track. Those good vibes should prove quite contagious as this lovely single begins to circulate."

== Track listing ==
US CD Single (Remixes)

1. "I Know" feat. Precise - (LP Single Edit)
2. "I Know" feat. Guru - (A Darkchild Remix Edit)
3. "I Know" - (LP Edit W/O Rap)

== Personnel ==
- Luther Vandross – lead and background vocals, vocal arrangements
- Reed Vertelney – keyboards, bass, drum and string programming
- Paul Jackson Jr. – electric guitar
- John "Skip" Anderson – additional keyboards
- Max Risenhoover – sound design, digital editing
- Stevie Wonder – harmonica

== Charts ==
Chart (1998)	Peak position
US Adult R&B Songs (Billboard)	6
