= Think About You (Luther Vandross song) =

Single by Luther Vandross

from the album Dance with My Father
- Released: 2003
- Length: 5:04 (album version); 3:26 (single edit)
- Label: J
- Songwriter(s): James Porte; Luther Vandross
- Producer(s): Luther Vandross

Luther Vandross singles chronology
| "Dance with My Father" (2003) | "Think About You" (2003) | "Buy Me a Rose" (2004) |

"Think About You" is a song by American singer Luther Vandross. It was written by James Porte and Vandross for his thirteenth studio album, Dance with My Father (2003), with production helmed by the latter. "Think About You" was a minor hit after its single release, and would later peak at number 29 on the US Billboard Hot R&B/Hip-Hop Songs chart, while also reaching the top of the Adult R&B Songs chart.

== Track listing ==
US CD single

| No. | Title | Length |
|---|---|---|
| 1. | "Think About You" (Radio Edit) | 3:26 |
| 2. | "Think About You" (Instrumental) | 5:00 |
| 3. | "Think About You" (Call Out Hook) | 0:10 |

== Charts ==
| Chart (2003–2004) | Peak position |
|---|---|
| US Adult R&B Songs (Billboard) | 1 |
| US Hot R&B/Hip-Hop Songs (Billboard) | 29 |
