= Luther Vandross (album) =

Studio album by Luther Vandross
- Released: June 19, 2001
- Recorded: November 2000–March 2001
- Length: 66:52
- Label: J
- Producers: Nat Adderley, Jr.; AllStar; Jon B.; Babyface; Eddie Berkeley; Warryn Campbell; Shep Crawford; Eddie F.; Keir Gist; Ron "Amen-Ra" Lawrence; Darren Lighty; Marcus Miller; Soulshock; The Underdogs; Junior Vasquez

Luther Vandross chronology
Smooth Love (2000)	Luther Vandross (2001)	The Ultimate Luther Vandross (2001)

Singles from Luther Vandross
- 1. "Take You Out" Released: June 9, 2001; 2. "Can Heaven Wait" Released: December 2001; 3. "I'd Rather" Released: April 16, 2002

Luther Vandross is the thirteenth studio album by American singer Luther Vandross. It was released by J Records on June 19, 2001 in the United States. His debut with the label after a brief stint with Virgin Records on I Know (1998), it marked a departure for Vandross who reunited with frequent collaborators Nat Adderley, Jr. and Marcus Miller to work on some songs, but also recruited a wider range of contemporary producers such as Warryn Campbell, Shep Crawford, Eddie F., Darren Lighty, Soulshock, and The Underdogs to contribute material.

The album was released to positive reception from music critics, who called it Vandross' best effort in a decade. His rendition of the 1962 Chuck Jackson song "Any Day Now" received a nomination for Best Traditional R&B Vocal Performance at the 2003 Grammy Awards. Upon release, Luther Vandross debuted at number six on the US Billboard 200, selling 136,000 copies, his best first week sales yet. The album produced three singles, including "Take You Out" which reached the top 30 on the Billboard Hot 100 and topped the Adult R&B Songs chart.

== Critical reception ==
Professional ratings
Review scores
Source	Rating
AllMusic	4/5 stars
Entertainment Weekly	A−
Rolling Stone	2.5/5 stars
The New Rolling Stone Album Guide	4/5 stars

AllMusic editor Jose F. Promis found that Luther Vandross was "a return to form," and ranked the album "as the singer's best since 1991's critically and commercially lauded Power of Love." He further called it "the singer's most engaging, exciting, and compelling album in years; [it] shows Vandross in step with changing times, all the while still managing to hold on to the essence of what made him so famous in the first place." People magazine called Luther Vandross "vintage Vandross" and wrote: "With his new disc, Vandross has finally come up with a collection of songs worthy of his silky, elastic tenor. Sounding as robust as ever despite having dropped 120 lbs. since his last album [...] Vandross works his seductive spells on sensitive slow jams [...]."

Denise Boyd from BBC Music noted that "with this album Luther has stepped into the 21st century with style. He's combined his classic soul sound with the new digitised R&B beat, therefore cleverly pleasing his die-hard fans and also paving the way for a new generation of followers. Luther is undisputedly still the king of soul ballads but he is also recognised as a force to be reckoned with on the new R&B scene." Entertainment Weekly's Robert Cherry felt that "Vandross doesn’t need to rely on expletives to stimulate a response. Armed with G-rated ballads and a bevy of hot producers who step aside to let the man do his thang, Vandross and his caramel-smooth croon could spark yet another baby boom." In a negative review, PopMatters editor Mark Anthony Neal called the album a "dismal attempt on Vandross' part to remain relevant to today’s listening audiences."

== Commercial performance ==
Luther Vandross debuted and peaked at number six on the US Billboard 200, selling 136,000 copies in its first week. It marked Vandross' best chart showing since Billboard began using SoundScan to track sales in 1991. On Billboard's component charts, the album reached number two on the Top R&B/Hip-Hop Albums chart, becoming his twelfth solo album to reach the top ten. In total, Luther Vandross sold 1.2 million copies domestically. It was eventually certified platinum by the Recording Industry Association of America (RIAA) for the shipment of over 1 million copies in the United States.

== Track listing ==
Luther Vandross track listing
No.	Title	Writer(s)	Producer(s)	Length
1.	"Take You Out"	Warryn Campbell; Harold Lilly; John Smith	Campbell	3:25
2.	"Grown Thangs"	Jonathan Buck; Kenneth Edmonds; Luther Vandross	Jon B.	4:32
3.	"Bring Your Heart to Mine"	Keir Gist; Eddie Berkeley; R. L. Huggar; Vandross	Gist; Berkeley	4:21
4.	"Can Heaven Wait"	Carsten Shack; Kenneth Karlin; Joshua Thompson; Danny Mercado; Quincy Patrick; Joe Thomas	Soulshock & Karlin	5:35
5.	"Say It Now"	Allen Gordon; Katrina Willis; Joel Campbell; Nate Butler	Soulshock & Karlin	4:32
6.	"Hearts Get Broken All the Time (But the Problem Is, This Time It's Mine)"	Vandross; Reed Vertelney	Vandross	5:19
7.	"I'd Rather"	Shep Crawford	Crawford	4:51
8.	"How Do I Tell Her"	Ron "Amen-Ra" Lawrence; Brook Richardson	Lawrence	4:17
9.	"Any Day Now"	Burt Bacharach; Bob Hilliard	Nat Adderley Jr.	5:11
10.	"If I Was the One"	Diane Warren	The Underdogs	4:19
11.	"Let's Make Tonight the Night"	Eddie Ferrell; Darren Lighty; Clifton Lighty; Balewa Muhammed; Vandross	Eddie F.; Darren Lighty	4:17
12.	"Like I'm Invisible"	Vandross; Fonzi Thornton; Rex Rideout	Edmonds; Vandross	4:00
13.	"Are You There (With Another Guy)"	Bacharach; Hal David	Vandross	5:55
14.	"Love Forgot"	Vandross; Marcus Miller	Vandross; Miller	5:36
15.	"You Really Started Something" (hidden track)	Vandross; Denise Rich; Junior Vasquez	Vasquez	4:37
Total length:				66:52

== Charts ==
=== Weekly charts ===
Weekly chart performance for Luther Vandross
Chart (2001)	Peak position
US Billboard 200	6
US Top R&B/Hip-Hop Albums (Billboard)	2

=== Year-end charts ===
2001 year-end chart performance for Luther Vandross
Chart (2001)	Position
US Billboard 200	108
US Top R&B/Hip-Hop Albums (Billboard)	42

2002 year-end chart performance for Luther Vandross
Chart (2002)	Position
US Top R&B/Hip-Hop Albums (Billboard)	72

== Certifications ==
Certifications for Luther Vandross
Region	Certification	Certified units/sales
United States (RIAA)	Platinum	1,064,384

== Release history ==
Luther Vandross release history
Region	Date	Format(s)	Label	Ref.
Asia	June 19, 2001	CD; cassette	J Records	
Canada	June 19, 2001	CD; cassette	J Records	
Japan	June 19, 2001	CD; cassette	J Records	
United States	June 19, 2001	CD; cassette	J Records	
Austria	October 8, 2001	CD; cassette	J Records	
