= I Know (Luther Vandross album) =

Studio album by Luther Vandross
- Released: August 11, 1998
- Recorded: January–May 1998
- Studio: Various: Clinton Recording Studios (New York City, New York); Sony Scoring Stage (Culver City, California); Sound Barriers (New York City, New York); The Hit Factory (New York City, New York); The Record Plant (Los Angeles, California)
- Genre: R&B; quiet storm; adult contemporary
- Length: 67:04
- Label: Virgin
- Producer: Luther Vandross (also executive); Marcus Miller; Nat Adderley, Jr.; Terence "Tramp Baby" Abney; Kenny "Dope" Gonzales; Tony Moran; "Little" Louie Vega

Luther Vandross chronology
Love Is on the Way (1998)	I Know (1998)	Always & Forever: The Classics (1999)

Singles from I Know
- 1. "I Know" Released: June 1998; 2. "Nights in Harlem" Released: July 14, 1998

I Know is the twelfth studio album by American R&B singer and songwriter Luther Vandross, released in August 1998 (see 1998 in music), and his only one for Virgin Records. It serves as his first album since fulfilling his contract with Epic after the release of his album Your Secret Love (1996). The album features guest appearances from artists such as Cassandra Wilson, Guru, Stevie Wonder, Brandy, Marcella Precise and Bob James.

The album's title track earned Vandross two nominations at the 41st Grammy Awards including for Best Traditional R&B Performance for the aforementioned album and Best Male R&B Vocal Performance for the album's single. The album debuted and peaked at number twenty-six on the US Billboard 200 album chart, becoming his first album since Give Me the Reason (1986) to miss the top ten of the albums chart. The album also peaked within the top ten of the R&B Albums chart, reaching number nine. It was later certified gold by the Recording Industry Association of America (RIAA) in late 1998, becoming his only studio album to do so. It was also Vandross' only album, barring his Christmas release, to not produce a charting single on the Billboard Hot 100.

== Critical reception ==
Professional ratings
Review scores
Source	Rating
AllMusic	4/5 stars
Entertainment Weekly	B−
Rolling Stone	3/5 stars
Vibe	(favorable)

AllMusic editor Tim Sheridan found that on Vandross' "Virgin debut, he eases into his groove once again. Whether he's dealing in the easy, gospel-inflected pop of album opener "Keeping My Faith in You" or the jazzy hooks of the title track, Vandross is in command. The disc is strong overall. R&B doesn't get any glossier." Paul Verna from Billboard felt that I Know was "a testament to what a real love song should be, rather than the bump'n'grind workouts that tend to masquerade as '90s romantic music." In a lukewarm review for Entertainment Weekly Tony Scherman wrote that "despite his having sold 20-plus million records, the latter-day king of R&B romance lacks the distinctiveness, the instantly recognizable sound of the genre’s true heroes [...] Treacle then, treacle now."

== Track listing ==
I Know track listing
No.	Title	Writer(s)	Producer(s)	Length
1.	"Keeping My Faith in You"	Luther Vandross; Reed Vertelney	Vandross	4:55
2.	"Isn't There Someone"	Vandross; Richard Marx	Vandross	4:41
3.	"Religion"	Vandross; Tony Moran	Vandross; Moran	4:35
4.	"Get It Right" (featuring Marcella Precise)	Vandross; Marcella Brailsford; Marcus Miller	Vandross; Terence "Tramp-Baby" Abney	5:26
5.	"I Know" (featuring Stevie Wonder on harmonica)	Vandross; Vertelney	Vandross	5:22
6.	"I'm Only Human" (featuring Cassandra Wilson and Bob James)	Vandross; Miller	Vandross; Miller	5:28
7.	"Nights in Harlem" (featuring Marcella Precise)	Vandross; Brailsford; Rex Rideout; Fonzi Thornton	Vandross	4:57
8.	"Dream Lover"	Vandross; Miller	Vandross	4:32
9.	"When I Need You"	Albert Hammond; Carole Bayer Sager	Nat Adderley Jr.	6:47
10.	"Are You Using Me?"	Vandross; Thornton; Carl Gonzalez; Luis Vager	Little Louie Vega; Kenny "Dope" Gonzalez	5:21
11.	"Are You Mad at Me?"	Vandross; John Anderson	Vandross	4:35
12.	"Now That I Have You"	Vandross; Vertelney	Vandross	5:01
13.	"Nights in Harlem (Darkchild Extended Remix)" (featuring Guru)	Vandross; Brailsford; Rideout; Thornton	Vandross; Rodney Jerkins (add.)	5:24
Total length:				67:04

== Charts ==
=== Weekly charts ===
Weekly chart performance for I Know
Chart (1998)	Peak position
UK Albums (OCC)	42
UK R&B Albums (OCC)	9
US Billboard 200	26
US Top R&B/Hip-Hop Albums (Billboard)	9

=== Year-end charts ===
Year-end chart performance for I Know
Chart (1998)	Position
US Top R&B/Hip-Hop Albums (Billboard)	88

== Certifications ==
Certifications for I Know
Region	Certification	Certified units/sales
United States (RIAA)	Gold	500,000^{^}
^{^} Shipments figures based on certification alone.
