= Dance with My Father (album) =

Studio album by Luther Vandross
- Released: June 10, 2003
- Recorded: April 2002–April 2003
- Studios: BearTracks Studios (Suffern, New York City); Hannibal Studios (Santa Monica, California); Playground/MiniMansion Studios (Closter, New Jersey); Right Track Recording The Hit Factory (New York, New York); Skip Trip-Algoryhthm Studios (Belle Mead, New Jersey); The Dengen (Torrance, California)
- Genre: R&B
- Length: 67:18
- Label: J
- Producers: Nat Adderley Jr.; Shep Crawford; Marcus Miller

Luther Vandross chronology
The Very Best of Love (2003)	Dance with My Father (2003)	The Essential Luther Vandross (2003)

Singles from Dance with My Father
- 1. "Dance with My Father" Released: May 30, 2003; 2. "Think About You" Released: September 2003; 3. "Buy Me a Rose" Released: January 2004

Dance with My Father is the fourteenth and final studio album by American singer Luther Vandross. It was released by J Records on June 10, 2003 in the United States and served as the follow-up to his self-titled studio album (2001). The album, especially its title track, was dedicated to Vandross's late father Luther Vandross, Sr. and features production credits from Nat Adderley Jr., Shep Crawford, and Marcus Miller as well as guest appearances by singer Beyoncé, R&B trio Next, and rappers Foxy Brown, Queen Latifah, and Busta Rhymes.

Upon its release, Dance with My Father debuted atop the US Billboard 200 chart with first week sales of 442,000 units, becoming his first and only album to do so. It also marked his eighth and first album in twelve years to top the Top R&B/Hip-Hop Albums chart. Critically acclaimed, Dance with My Father earned Vandross two American Music Awards in the Favorite Soul/R&B Male Artist and the Favorite Soul/R&B Album categories as well as four Grammy Awards wins out of five nominations, including Song of the Year and Best Male R&B Vocal Performance for "Dance with My Father", Best R&B Performance by a Duo or Group with Vocals for "The Closer I Get to You", his duet with Beyoncé, and Best R&B Album.

== Critical reception ==
Professional ratings
Review scores
Source	Rating
AllMusic	4/5 stars
The Guardian	4/5 stars
Entertainment Weekly	B
Los Angeles Times	3/4 stars
New York Post	3.5/4 stars
Plugged In	(mixed)
Rolling Stone	3/5 stars
Vibe	3/5 marks

Dance with My Father was released to generally positive reviews from music critics. In his review for AllMusic, David Jeffries summed that "Dance with My Father isn't able to maintain the high standards it often achieves, but Vandross' voice is always compelling and the background singers live up to the superior arrangements throughout. With nearly 70 minutes of music on the disc to choose from, more savvy listeners will be able to program their CD players for a more focused and rewarding listen." He rated the album four out of five stars. Writing for The Guardian, Adam Sweeting declared the album "one of Vandross's very finest recordings." He found that "always a class act, a kind of top-of-the-range Lexus among soulmen, Vandross has clung to his traditional strengths – lush melodies and artful arrangements, sung with that elegantly beseeching voice – while incorporating some discreet nods to modernity."

BBC Music critic Jack Smith called Dance with My Father "another faultless, high-gloss collection of love songs to follow his 2001 Luther Vandross release [...] Now in his early-50s, Vandross is so much the master of his craft, you cant help but want him to stretch out a little, take a few chances, maybe get a collaborator with some more imaginative ideas for instrumentation to match his own impeccable vocal arrangements. But if you like your R&B to be smooth and your songs to be grown-up, you're not going to argue too much." Los Angeles Times editor described the album as "a beautifully sung, ultra-nostalgic ballad cataloging childhood memories of his long-departed dad. But more to the point, [it] better updates the singer-songwriter-producer's time-tested strengths as a butter-voiced chronicler of romance." Gail Mitchell, writing for Billboard, found that Dance with My Father was "signature Luther: hot-buttered vocals dripping over lush ballads, with occasional midtempo spikes [...] Vandross proves, again, that he's a gifted vocalist who transcends time."

=== Accolades ===
Awards and nominations for Dance with My Father
Organization	Year	Category	Result	Ref.
American Music Awards	2003	Favorite Soul/R&B Album	Won	
American Music Awards	2003	Favorite Soul/R&B Male Artist	Won	
BET Awards	2004	Best Male R&B Artist	Nominated	
Grammy Award	2004	Song of the Year	Won	
Grammy Award	2004	Best Male R&B Vocal Performance	Won	
Grammy Award	2004	Best R&B Song	Nominated	
Grammy Award	2004	Best R&B Performance by a Duo or Group with Vocals	Won	
Grammy Award	2004	Best R&B Album	Won	
NAACP Image Awards	2004	Outstanding Album	Won	
NAACP Image Awards	2004	Outstanding Male Artist	Won	
NAACP Image Awards	2004	Outstanding Music Video	Won	
NAACP Image Awards	2004	Outstanding Song	Won	
Soul Train Music Awards	2004	Best Album of the Year	Nominated	
Soul Train Music Awards	2004	Best R&B/Soul Album – Male	Nominated	
Soul Train Music Awards	2004	Best R&B/Soul Single – Male	Won	
Soul Train Music Awards	2005	Best R&B/Soul Single – Group, Band or Duo	Nominated	

== Chart performance ==
Upon its release, Dance with My Father debuted atop the US Billboard 200 chart with first week sales of 442,000 units, becoming Vandross' first and only album to do so, while also marking his best sales week in the Nielsen SoundScan era. The album was his eighth and first album in the twelve years to top the Top R&B/Hip-Hop Albums chart. By October 2003, Dance with My Father had sold 1.2 million copies in the United States. On April 14, 2004, it was certified Double Platinum by the Recording Industry Association of America (RAA) for domestic shipments figures in excess of 2.0 million units.

== Track listing ==
Dance with My Father track listing
No.	Title	Writer(s)	Producer(s)	Length
1.	"If I Didn't Know Better"	Ezekiel Lewis; Luther Vandross; Reed Vertelney	Vandross	4:07
2.	"Think About You"	James Porte; Vandross	Vandross	5:04
3.	"If It Ain't One Thing" (featuring Foxy Brown)	Robbie Nevil; Vandross; Vertelney; Inga Marchand	Vandross	4:13
4.	"Buy Me a Rose"	Jim Funk; Erick Hickenlooper	Shep Crawford	3:48
5.	"The Closer I Get to You" (duet with Beyoncé)	Reggie Lucas; James Mtume	Nat Adderley, Jr.	6:25
6.	"Lovely Day" (featuring Busta Rhymes)	Ronald LaPread; Lionel Richie; Bill Withers; Clarence Scarborough	Vandross; Marcus Miller	5:57
7.	"Dance with My Father"	Vandross; Richard Marx	Vandross	4:26
8.	"She Saw You"	Vandross; Miller	Vandross; Miller	5:44
9.	"Apologize"	Rex Rideout; Vandross	Vandross	4:59
10.	"Hit It Again" (featuring Queen Latifah)	Rideout; Vandross	Vandross	4:37
11.	"Right in the Middle"	Vandross; Vertelney	Vandross	4:50
12.	"Once Were Lovers"	Rideout; Fonzi Thornton; Vandross	Vandross	4:34
13.	"Lovely Day (Part II)" (featuring Busta Rhymes and Next)	LaPread; Richie; Withers; Scarborough	Vandross	3:54
14.	"They Said You Needed Me"	Ivan Hampden Jr.; Vandross	Vandross; Adderley	4:40
Total length:				67:18

Sample credits

- "Lovely Day (Part II)" contains excerpts from the composition "Say Yeah" as performed by The Commodores.

== Personnel ==
Adapted from AllMusic.

- Nat Adderley Jr. – arranger, keyboards, piano, producer, string arrangements
- Tawatha Agee – background vocals
- Sanford Allen – concert master
- Alli – art direction
- June Ambrose – stylist
- Skip Anderson – arranger, keyboards, programming, soloist, vibraphone
- Ray Bardani – engineer, mixing, string engineer
- Beyoncé – primary artist
- Big Bub – background vocals
- Jeff Bova – sound design
- Al Brown – string contractor
- Al Brown & His Tunetoppers – string contractor
- Foxy Brown – featured artist, guest artist, vocals
- Sharon Bryant – background vocals
- Busta Rhymes – featured artist, guest artist, vocals
- Shep Crawford – instrumentation, producer
- Carl Cyrius – assistant engineer
- Jason Dale – assistant engineer
- Jill Dell'Abate – production coordination
- DJ Kay Gee – remix producer
- James Ervin – choreographer
- Jim Ervin – choreographer
- Eddie F. – remix producer
- Paul J. Falcone – vocal engineer, vocal recording
- Phil Hamilton – guitar
- Reggie Hamilton – bass
- Ivan Hampden – arranger, drum programming, drums, keyboard programming
- Cissy Houston – guest artist, background vocals
- Loren Howard – mixing assistant
- Roger Innocent – hair stylist
- Michael J – background vocals
- Paul Jackson Jr. – guitar
- Brion James – guitar
- Chris James – piano
- Joyce James – performer, background vocals
- Bashiri Johnson – percussion
- Jeff Jones – hair stylist, make-Up
- Beyoncé Knowles – primary artist
- Chris LeBeau – art producer, artwork
- Darren Lighty – remix producer
- Richard Marx – drum programming, keyboard programming
- Michael McCoy – assistant engineer
- Rick McDonald – background vocals
- Daniel Milazzo – assistant engineer
- Byron Miller – bass
- Marcus Miller – arranger, drum programming, engineer, keyboard programming, producer, background vocals
- Claudius Mittendorfer – assistant engineer
- Cindy Mizelle – background vocals
- Robbie Nevil – guitar, keyboards
- Flip Osman – assistant engineer
- April Owens – group member, performer, background vocals
- Dave Perini – assistant engineer
- James Porte – arranger, drum programming, keyboard programming
- Herb Powers Jr. – mastering
- Queen Latifah – featured artist, guest artist, primary artist, vocals
- Jerome Ramos – bass
- Rex Rideout – arranger, drum programming, keyboard programming
- RL – background vocals
- Matt Snedecor – assistant engineer
- Jason Stasium – assistant engineer
- Max Szadek – assistant, personal assistant
- Candace Thomas – group member, performer, background vocals
- Fonzi Thornton – vocal contractor, background vocals
- Luther Vandross – executive producer, primary artist, producer, vocal arrangement, vocals, background vocals
- Gabriel Varde – engineer, tracking
- Víctor Vega – guitar
- Reed Vertelney – arranger, drum programming, keyboard programming
- Jamie Wallace – assistant engineer
- Stan Wallace – engineer
- Rick Watford – guitar
- Ricky Watford "Bishop" – guitar
- Kevin Westenberg – photography
- Brenda White-King – background vocals
- James "D-Train" Williams – background vocals
- Jay Williams – guitar
- Stevie Wonder – guest artist, harmonica, soloist
- "You Can Ask" Giz – engineer, mixing

== Charts ==
=== Weekly charts ===
Weekly chart performance for Dance with My Father
Chart (2003–2004)	Peak position
Australian Albums (ARIA)	60
Australian Urban Albums (ARIA)	9
Canadian Albums (Nielsen SoundScan)	23
Canadian R&B Albums (Nielsen SoundScan)	4
UK Albums (Official Charts)	41
UK R&B Albums (Official Charts)	6
US Billboard 200	1
US Top R&B/Hip-Hop Albums (Billboard)	1

=== Year-end charts ===
2003 year-end chart performance for Dance with My Father
Chart (2003)	Position
US Billboard 200	37
US Top R&B/Hip-Hop Albums (Billboard)	8

2004 year-end chart performance for Dance with My Father
Chart (2004)	Position
US Billboard 200	106
US Top R&B/Hip-Hop Albums (Billboard)	35

== Certifications ==
Certifications for Dance with My Father
Region	Certification	Certified units/sales
Canada (Music Canada)	Gold	50,000^{^}
South Africa (RISA)	Platinum	50,000^{*}
United Kingdom (BPI)	Gold	100,000^{^}
United States (RIAA)	2× Platinum	2,000,000^{^}
^{*} Sales figures based on certification alone.^{^} Shipments figures based on certification alone.
