= Buy Me a Rose =

1999 single by Kenny Rogers featuring Alison Krauss and Billy Dean

- Cover of the Netherlands release CD single

Single by Kenny Rogers featuring Alison Krauss and Billy Dean

from the album She Rides Wild Horses
- Released: October 13, 1999
- Recorded: 1999
- Genre: Country
- Length: 3:48
- Label: Dreamcatcher
- Songwriters: Jim Funk, Erik Hickenlooper
- Producer: Kenny Rogers

Kenny Rogers singles chronology
"Slow Dance More" (1999)	"Buy Me a Rose" (1999)	"He Will, She Knows" (2000)

Alison Krauss singles chronology
"Stay" (1999)	"Buy Me a Rose" (1999)	"Maybe" (2000)

Billy Dean singles chronology
"Innocent Bystander" (1998)	"Buy Me a Rose" (1999)	"Keep Mom and Dad in Love" (2001)

"Buy Me a Rose" is a song written by Jim Funk and Erik Hickenlooper, and recorded by American country music artist Kenny Rogers. It was released in October 1999 as the third single from his album She Rides Wild Horses and peaked at number one on the Billboard Hot Country Singles & Tracks (now Hot Country Songs) charts in May 2000. The song made Rogers (who was 61 years old at the time) the oldest country singer to have a number one hit until Willie Nelson (at age 70) beat the record through a duet with Toby Keith on his 2003 single "Beer for My Horses". "Buy Me a Rose" was Rogers' first number one hit since 1987's "Make No Mistake, She's Mine" (a duet with Ronnie Milsap) and his final charting top 40 hit on the US Billboard Hot 100 chart since 1984's "What About Me?".

It was both Alison Krauss' and Billy Dean's only number one hit, as they received credit for performing background vocals on the song. "Buy Me a Rose" was also the first independently-released song to top the country charts since "Baby's Got a New Baby" by S-K-O (Schuyler, Knoblock, and Overstreet) did so in 1987.

The song also hit #13 on the Hot Adult Contemporary Tracks chart in 2004 for Luther Vandross.

== Content ==
"Buy Me a Rose" is a ballad, telling of a husband who attempts to please his wife with material objects, such as a "three-car garage and her own credit cards." The wife remains unsatisfied, however, as she prefers simpler gestures, such as the husband purchasing her a rose from a florist, or having a door held open for her, implying that he should also mind his manners. By the third verse, the singer reveals that he is actually the husband in the story; in addition, he states that he has finally realized what his wife desires. The song ends with him finally making that realization ("So I bought you a rose on the way home from work...").

== Critical reception ==
Kevin John Coyne rated the song "A", praising the twist of the final verse in particular and comparing it thematically to "Hold Me" by K.T. Oslin.

== Personnel ==
From She Rides Wild Horses liner notes.

- Eddie Bayers - drums
- Bruce Bouton - steel guitar
- Spencer Campbell - bass guitar
- Billy Dean - vocals
- Alison Krauss - vocals
- Steve Mandile - guitars
- Nashville String Machine - strings
- Bobby Ogdin - keyboards
- Kenny Rogers - vocals

== Chart performance ==
=== Weekly charts ===
Chart (1999–2000)	Peak position
Canada Country Singles (RPM)	9
US Billboard Hot 100	40
US Hot Country Songs (Billboard)	1

=== Year-end charts ===
Chart (2000)	Position
US Country Songs (Billboard)	18

== Luther Vandross version ==
"Buy Me a Rose"

Single by Luther Vandross

from the album Dance with My Father
- Released: January 2004
- Genre: Pop, adult contemporary
- Length: 3:49
- Label: J
- Songwriters: Jim Funk, Erik Hickenlooper
- Producer: Shep Crawford

Luther Vandross singles chronology
"Think About You" (2003)	"Buy Me a Rose" (2004)	"The Closer I Get to You" (2004)

R&B/soul singer-songwriter Luther Vandross covered the song for his 2003 album Dance with My Father. Vandross's version peaked at number 13 on the U.S. Billboard Hot Adult Contemporary Tracks chart in 2004.

=== Weekly charts ===
Chart (2004)	Peak position
US Adult Contemporary (Billboard)	13

=== Year-end charts ===
Chart (2004)	Position
US Adult Contemporary (Billboard)	21
