= I'd Rather =

Single by Luther Vandross

from the album Luther Vandross
- Released: April 16, 2002
- Genre: R&B, soul
- Length: 4:51
- Label: J
- Songwriter: Shep Crawford
- Producer: Shep Crawford

Luther Vandross singles chronology
"Can Heaven Wait" (2001)	"I'd Rather" (2002)	"Dance with My Father" (2003)

"I'd Rather" is a song by American singer Luther Vandross. It written and produced by Shep Crawford and recorded by Vandross for his eponymous album (2001). The song was released as the album's third and final single. "I'd Rather" became a top 20 hit on Billboard's Adult Contemporary chart and reached the top 40 on the Hot R&B/Hip-Hop Songs charts. It also topped the US Adult R&B Songs chart, the second single from Luther Vandross to do so.

== Credits and personnel ==
Credits lifted from the liner notes of Luther Vandross.

- Tawatha Agee – backing vocalist
- Shep Crawford – instruments, producer, writer
- Paulette McWilliams – backing vocalist
- Cindy Mizelle – backing vocalist
- Kevin Owens – backing vocalist
- The Professa – guitar
- Fonzi Thornton – contractor
- Clinta Turner – backing vocalist
- Luther Vandross – vocals
- Brenda White-King – backing vocalist

== Charts ==
=== Weekly charts ===
Chart (2002)	Peak position
US Billboard Hot 100	83
US Adult R&B Songs (Billboard)	1
US Hot R&B/Hip-Hop Songs (Billboard)	40

=== Year-end charts ===
Chart (2002)	Position
US Hot R&B/Hip-Hop Songs (Billboard)	87
