= Dance with My Father (song) =

Single by Luther Vandross

from the album Dance with My Father
- Released: May 30, 2003
- Genre: R&B; adult contemporary
- Length: 4:26
- Label: J
- Songwriters: Luther Vandross; Richard Marx
- Producers: Luther Vandross; Nat Adderley Jr.

Luther Vandross singles chronology
"I'd Rather" (2002)	"Dance with My Father" (2003)	"Think About You" (2003)

Music video
- "Luther Vandross - Dance With My Father" on YouTube

"Dance with My Father" is a song by Luther Vandross and the title track to his fourteenth and final studio album. It was released in May 2003 as the album's lead single. With Richard Marx, Vandross wrote the song based on his personal experience. The lyrics recall childhood memories with Vandross's father, who danced with him and his mother. It was the last song he recorded before he suffered a severe stroke just ten days later, on April 16, 2003.

Despite little promotion due in part to Vandross's hospitalization, "Dance with My Father" became one of the most requested songs at the time. During the 2004 Grammy Awards, "Dance with My Father" won the Song of the Year and Best Male R&B Vocal Performance accolades.

== Composition and release ==
Vandross wrote "Dance with My Father" with Marx, based on his personal experience. Considered by Vandross as his "career song", "Dance with My Father" is a tribute to his father, Luther Vandross Sr., who died due to complications of diabetes. Vandross was eight when his father died. According to Marx, writing the song was emotional for Vandross because it is "a subject matter [Vandross] hadn't written before".

On the backdrop of strings and interplay of piano and drums, Vandross recalls fond memories with his father who often danced with his mother. Mary Ida, his mother, stated, "I was amazed at how well Luther remembered his father, how we used to dance and sing in the house. I was so surprised that at 7 1/2 years of age, he could remember what a happy household we had." Barry Walters of Rolling Stone magazine qualifies the memories invoked in the lyrics as painful and private, adding that when Vandross asks God to return his father, it "turn[s] a potentially maudlin song into a meditative, deeply personal prayer".

At the time of the song's release as a single on May 30, 2003, Vandross had been hospitalized due to his suffering from stroke. This timely release of the song gained attention from critics. On his review for the album, David Jeffries of AllMusic wrote that its release "makes the song's references to absent loved ones even more poignant". For Larry Flick of The Advocate, it transformed the song into "a haunting composition rife with subtext".

== Reception ==
Although Vandross was unable to promote the single, "Dance with My Father" was able to reach number one on music stations. For instance, it achieved top position in WLTW, which was one of the first stations in the United States to play the track. Before his stroke, Vandross wrote to WLTW's program director, informing him of what he considered to be his "career song". The director asked permission from the label, but it was not until after the hospitalization that J Records permitted the airplay, following the song being featured in Boston Public on April 28, 2003. "Dance with My Father" became one of the most requested songs at the time, spawning "a number of weepy phone calls and requests".

In February 2004, "Dance with My Father" won a Grammy Award for Song of the Year for Vandross and Marx and a Grammy Award for Best Male R&B Vocal Performance for Vandross. Marx accepted the award on behalf of Vandross, who was unable to attend due to health concerns. At the same event, singer Celine Dion agreed to perform a live rendition of the song on Vandross's behalf, and Marx accompanied her on the piano as her father had died some time before the ceremony. After the performance, Vandross however accepted the awards on a videotaped speech.

With his death in 2005, "Dance with My Father" was the last top 40 hit for Luther Vandross in the United States, peaking at number 38. The song also peaked at number 21 in the UK singles chart. On August 29, 2009, the song re-entered the UK top 40 after a performance of the song on The X Factor by Joe McElderry.

== Music video ==
While Vandross was hospitalized, a music video was filmed for the single. Directed by Diane Martel, the video features musicians, singers, actors and athletes, as well as several of Vandross's fans. The video also features childhood snapshots of Vandross.

Celebrities who made cameos are Monica, Beyoncé, Brian McKnight, Johnny Gill, Stevie Wonder, Garcelle Beauvais, Damon Wayans, Holly Robinson Peete, Whitney Houston, Janet Jackson, Jason Kidd, Derek Jeter, Master P, Lil Romeo, Babyface, Lalah Hathaway, Queen Latifah, Ashanti, Celine Dion, Nickolas Ashford, Nona Gaye, Patti LaBelle, Ruben Studdard, Brandy, Quincy Jones, Wyclef Jean, Wayne Brady, Morris Chestnut, and Shaquille O'Neal.

== Versions and appearances ==
"Dance with My Father" has been released in various cover versions, appearing on many albums and music media formats. Among the most notable is a version released in 2004 by country music singer Kellie Coffey. This version peaked at number 41 on the Billboard Hot Country Singles & Tracks (now Hot Country Songs) chart.

== Charts ==
=== Weekly charts ===
Chart (2003–04)	Peak position
Scottish Singles Sales (Official Charts)	40
UK Singles (Official Charts)	21
US Billboard Hot 100	38
US Adult Contemporary (Billboard)	4
US Adult R&B Songs (Billboard)	1
US Hot R&B/Hip-Hop Songs (Billboard)	28
Chart (2010)	Peak position
Austria (Ö3 Austria Top 40)	42
Switzerland (Schweizer Hitparade)	50
Chart (2014)	Peak position
South Korea International (Circle)	76
Chart (2021–22)	Peak position
South Africa Airplay (RISA)	15
Chart (2026)	Peak position
Jamaica Airplay (JAMMS)	6
South Africa Airplay (TOSAC)	6

=== Year-end charts ===
Chart (2003)	Position
US Adult Contemporary (Billboard)	16
US Hot R&B/Hip-Hop Songs (Billboard)	74

== Certifications ==
Region	Certification	Certified units/sales
New Zealand (RMNZ)	Platinum	30,000^{‡}
United Kingdom (BPI)	Platinum	600,000^{‡}
United States (RIAA)	Platinum	1,000,000^{‡}
^{‡} Sales+streaming figures based on certification alone.
