= Take You Out =

Single by Luther Vandross

from the album Luther Vandross
- Released: April 24, 2001
- Length: 3:26
- Label: J
- Songwriters: Warryn Campbell; Harold Lilly; John Smith
- Producer: Warryn Campbell

Luther Vandross singles chronology
"I Know" (1998)	"Take You Out" (2001)	"Can Heaven Wait" (2001)

"Take You Out" is a song by American recording artist Luther Vandross. It was written by Warryn Campbell, Harold Lilly, and John Smith and produced by the former for Vandross's self-titled twelfth studio album (2001). Released as the album's lead single, the song topped the US Adult R&B Songs chart and became a top ten hit on the Hot R&B/Hip-Hop Songs, while peaking at number 26 on the Billboard Hot 100. "Take You Out" was later interpolated by American rapper Jay-Z in his song "Excuse Me Miss", on his album The Blueprint 2: The Gift & The Curse, released in 2002.

== Track listing ==
US CD single

No.	Title	Length
1.	"Take You Out"	3:26
2.	"Let's Make Tonight The Night"	4:16

UK maxi single

No.	Title	Length
1.	"Take You Out" (Album Version)	3:43
2.	"Take You Out" (Karmadelic Funk It Up Mix)	3:59
3.	"Take You Out" (Allstar Remix)	3:43
4.	"Take You Out" (Video)	3:43

== Personnel ==
- Luther Vandross – lead vocals
- Warryn Campbell – background vocals, producer, engineer
- Harold Lilly – background vocals
- John Smith – guitar
- Paul Falcone – mixing

== Charts ==
=== Weekly charts ===
Chart (2001)	Peak position
UK Singles (OCC)	59
US Billboard Hot 100	26
US Adult R&B Songs (Billboard)	1
US Hot R&B/Hip-Hop Songs (Billboard)	7

=== Year-end charts ===
Chart (2001)	Position
US Hot R&B/Hip-Hop Songs (Billboard)	40
