= Never Too Much (song) =

1981 single by Luther Vandross

- Side-A label of the U.S. 1981 single

Single by Luther Vandross

from the album Never Too Much
- B-side: "You Stopped Loving Me"
- Released: October 1981
- Recorded: July 21, 1981
- Genre: R&B; post-disco
- Length: 3:50
- Label: Epic
- Songwriter: Luther Vandross
- Producer: Luther Vandross

Luther Vandross singles chronology
"Never Too Much" (1981)	"Don't You Know That?" (1981)

Music video
- "Never Too Much" on YouTube

"Never Too Much" is the debut single written, produced, and performed by American singer-songwriter Luther Vandross. The R&B song was released in October 1981 by Epic Records, as the lead single from Vandross's debut album of the same name (1981). The title track hit number one on the US Billboard Hot R&B/Hip-Hop Songs chart and number four on the US Billboard Dance Club Songs chart. It peaked at No. 27 on Cash Box and No. 33 on the US Billboard Hot 100.

The album (Vandross' first as a solo artist) received several accolades, including two Grammy Award nominations in 1982, for Best New Artist and Best R&B Vocal Performance, Male. A remixed version of the song reached number 13 on the UK singles chart in November 1989.

The single was released alongside a music video in which he is shown singing in a recording studio.

The song has also been included on several Vandross compilation albums, including The Ultimate Luther Vandross, a greatest hits album released in 2001.

"Never Too Much" was ranked number 466 on Rolling Stone's list of The 500 Greatest Songs of All Time in September 2021.

== Track listings ==
- US 1981 7" single
1. "Never Too Much" – 3:50
2. "You Stopped Loving Me" – 4:59
- UK 1981 7" single
1. "Never Too Much" – 3:50
2. "Don't You Know That?" – 4:04
- UK 1981 12" single
1. "Never Too Much" (extended version) – 5:38
2. "Sugar and Spice (I Found Me a Girl)" – 4:57
3. "Don't You Know That?" – 4:04
- UK 1989 7" single
1. "Never Too Much" (remix '89 by Justin Strauss) – 4:02
2. "The Glow of Love" – 6:10
- UK 1989 12" single
1. "Never Too Much" (extended remix '89 by Justin Strauss) – 6:42
2. "Never Too Much" (original remix '81 a.k.a. extended version) – 5:38
3. "The Glow of Love" – 6:10
- UK 1989 alternative 12" single
1. "Never Too Much" (Ben Liebrand mix) – 7:30
2. "Never Too Much" (alternate vocal mix '89 by Justin Strauss) – 6:49
3. "Never Too Much" (original 7" version) – 3:50

== Personnel ==
- Luther Vandross – lead vocals, rhythm arrangement
- Nathaniel Adderley Jr. – keyboards, rhythm arrangement
- Buddy Williams – drums
- Marcus Miller – bass
- Georg Wadenius – guitar
- Crusher Bennett – percussion
- Bashiri Johnson – congas
- Paul Riser – strings, horns
- Cissy Houston, Tawatha Agee, Yvonne Lewis, Michelle Cobbs, Brenda White, Sybil Thomas – background vocals

== Charts ==
Chart (1981–1989)	Peak position
Ireland (IRMA)	18
Luxembourg (Radio Luxembourg)	11
New Zealand (Recorded Music NZ)	47
UK Singles (Official Charts)	13
US Billboard Hot 100	33
US Dance Club Songs (Billboard)	4
US Hot Soul Singles (Billboard)	1

== Certifications ==
Region	Certification	Certified units/sales
Denmark (IFPI Danmark)	Gold	45,000^{‡}
New Zealand (RMNZ)	2× Platinum	60,000^{‡}
United Kingdom (BPI)	3× Platinum	1,800,000^{‡}
United States (RIAA)	Platinum	1,000,000^{‡}
^{‡} Sales+streaming figures based on certification alone.

== Samples and cover versions ==
=== Samples ===
- The song, without Vandross's vocals, was sampled by Will Smith (who was then known as The Fresh Prince) in "Can't Wait to Be with You" on his and Jeffrey A. Townes's hit album Code Red (1993). Smith (by that time a.k.a. Big Will) also used the vocal melody and lyrics from the song's chorus in "1,000 Kisses" on his 2002 album Born to Reign.
- Teddy Riley protege rapper Queen Pen sampled the song on the track "All My Love" produced by Riley from her 1997 debut album My Melody featuring Riley's groupmate Eric Williams (both from the group Blackstreet).
- Keyshia Cole sampled the song on the Eve-assisted track "Never" from her 2005 debut album The Way It Is, and it was also featured on the soundtrack of the 2004 film Barbershop 2: Back in Business.
- In 2015, Paul Kalkbrenner sampled the song in "A Million Days" on his album 7.
- Fat Joe, DJ Khaled and Amorphous sampled the song for their 2021 single "Sunshine (The Light)".

=== Cover versions ===
- Guitarist Craig T. Cooper covered the song for his 1996 album Romantic Letter.
- In 1997, contemporary jazz guitarist Richard Smith recorded a take for the album First Kiss.
- In 2004, jazz guitarist Paul Jackson Jr. recorded a cover for the Vandross tribute album Forever, for Always, for Luther.
- In 2005, the song was covered by Mary J. Blige for another Vandross tribute album entitled So Amazing: An All-Star Tribute to Luther Vandross.
- In 2013, vocalist Tracy Hamlin covered the song for her album This Is My Life.
- In 2014, John "Jon Jon" Harreld, of the R&B group Troop, covered the song in tribute to Vandross, and released the song as a single.

== In film, television, and video games ==
- The first minute of this song is used in the American sitcom WKRP in Cincinnati season four episode 17 "Fire" (March 17, 1982), until it is unceremoniously cut off by Les Nessman when he reports that the Flimm Building is on fire while Venus Flytrap is on air.
- The song was used in the soundtrack for the Rockstar Games 2002 action-adventure video game Grand Theft Auto: Vice City on the in-game radio station Emotion 98.3.
- "Never Too Much" is featured on the soundtrack of the 2012 film Think Like a Man.
- The intro of the song was used during the announcement of the guests in the Dutch daily late night show Jinek.
- The song was used in The Simpsons' "Treehouse of Horror XXV" episode and includes a segment spoofing the film A Clockwork Orange.
- The song was used in the Google Doodle celebrating Luther Vandross's 70th birthday on April 20, 2021.
- Drag artists Willow Pill and Bosco lip-synced to the song on RuPaul's Drag Race, season 14, episode 11.
