= One Night with You: The Best of Love, Volume 2 =

Greatest hits album by Luther Vandross
- Released: September 17, 1997
- Recorded: 1991–1997
- Genres: R&B, soul, pop, adult contemporary
- Label: Epic
- Producers: Luther Vandross, Nat Adderley Jr., Walter Afanasieff, Jimmy Jam and Terry Lewis, R. Kelly, Marcus Miller, David Morales, Tony Moran, Ralph Stacy, Keith Thomas, Jim Wright

Luther Vandross chronology
Your Secret Love (1996)	One Night with You: The Best of Love, Volume 2 (1997)	Love Is on the Way (1998)

Professional ratings
Review scores
Source	Rating
AllMusic	link
Uncut	3/5 stars

One Night with You: The Best of Love, Volume 2 (issued internationally without 'Volume 2') is the third compilation album released by American singer Luther Vandross, released on September 15, 1997, by Epic Records. It is his second compilation album to be released stateside, and is a continuation of his triple-platinum selling first compilation The Best of Luther Vandross... The Best of Love (1989). One Night with You contains four newly recorded songs including the R. Kelly-penned and Grammy-nominated "When You Call on Me/Baby That's When I Come Runnin'" and selections compiled from his later studio albums such as Songs (1994), This Is Christmas (1995), Never Let Me Go (1993), Power of Love (1991) and Your Secret Love (1996).

The album also contains his then-biggest pop hits such as "Power of Love/Love Power", an alternate club mix of "The Best Things in Life Are Free" (a duet with Janet Jackson from the Mo' Money soundtrack) and a cover of the Lionel Richie/Diana Ross recording "Endless Love" with Mariah Carey, which became his biggest hit on the Billboard Hot 100 peaking at number two. The album was moderately successful, reaching the top 50 of the Billboard 200 album chart and peaking inside the top 20 within the R&B Albums chart. One Night with You was certified platinum by the Recording Industry Association of America (RIAA) in 2021.

== Track listing ==
North American edition
No.	Title	Writer(s)	Length
1.	"One Night with You (Everyday of Your Life)"	Diane Warren	4:25
2.	"When You Call on Me/Baby That's When I Come Runnin'"	R. Kelly	4:42
3.	"It's All About You"	Dennis Bettis; Ronald Neal; Ralph B. Stacy	5:29
4.	"I Won't Let You Do That to Me"	James Harris III; Terry Lewis; James Wright	4:34
5.	"Power of Love/Love Power"	Luther Vandross; Marcus Miller; Teddy Vann	6:42
6.	"Don't Want to Be a Fool"	Vandross; Miller	4:36
7.	"The Best Things in Life Are Free" (Classic Club Edit; from the Motion Picture Soundtrack "Mo' Money"; duet with Janet Jackson)	Harris III; Lewis; Michael Bivins; Ronnie DeVoe; Harry Wayne Casey; Richard Finch	4:03
8.	"Little Miracles (Happen Every Day)"	Vandross; Miller	4:43
9.	"Endless Love" (Duet with Mariah Carey)	Lionel Richie	4:20
10.	"Always and Forever"	Rod Temperton	4:54
11.	"Love the One You're With"	Stephen Stills	5:04
12.	"Your Secret Love"	Vandross; Reed Vertelney	4:12
13.	"I Can Make It Better"	Vandross; Miller	5:36
14.	"Love Don't Love You Anymore" (TM's Urban Mix)	Vandross	4:09
15.	"My Favorite Things"	Richard Rodgers; Oscar Hammerstein II	5:56
Total length:			73:25

=== International edition ===
1. "When You Call on Me/Baby That's When I Come Runnin'" – 4:42
2. "One Night with You (Everyday of Your Life)" – 4:25
3. "I Won't Let You Do That to Me" – 4:34
4. "It's All About You" – 5:29
5. "The Rush"
6. "I Gave It Up (When I Fell in Love)"
7. "Don't Want to Be a Fool" – 4:36
8. "The Best Things in Life Are Free" (Classic Club Edit with Janet Jackson) – 4:03
9. "Little Miracles (Happen Every Day)" – 4:43
10. "Endless Love" (with Mariah Carey) – 4:20
11. "Always and Forever" – 4:54
12. "Hello"
13. "Your Secret Love" – 4:12
14. "I Can Make It Better" – 5:36
15. "Love Don't Love You Anymore" (TM's Urban Mix) – 4:09
16. "Heaven Knows"

== Charts ==
Chart (1997)	Peak position
Australian Albums (ARIA)	186
UK Albums (Official Charts)	23
UK R&B Albums (Official Charts)	12
US Billboard 200	44
US Top R&B/Hip-Hop Albums (Billboard)	17

== Certifications ==
Region	Certification	Certified units/sales
United States (RIAA)	Platinum	1,000,000^{‡}
^{‡} Sales+streaming figures based on certification alone.
