= Your Secret Love =

Studio album by Luther Vandross
- Released: October 1, 1996
- Recorded: October 1995–July 1996
- Studio: Camel Island Studios (Los Angeles)
- Length: 60:14
- Labels: LV; Epic
- Producers: Luther Vandross (also exec.); Marcus Miller; Nat Adderley, Jr.

Luther Vandross chronology
This Is Christmas (1995)	Your Secret Love (1996)	One Night with You: The Best of Love, Volume 2 (1997)

Singles from Your Secret Love
- 1. "Your Secret Love" Released: August 20, 1996; 2. "I Can Make It Better" Released: November 26, 1996

Your Secret Love is the eleventh studio album by American R&B singer Luther Vandross, released by Epic Records in October 1996. The album's title track won the Best Male R&B Vocal Performance and was nominated for Best R&B Song at the 39th Grammy Awards in 1997. The album served as Vandross's final album under Epic Records after being part of the record label for fifteen years.

== Critical reception ==
Professional ratings
Review scores
Source	Rating
AllMusic	3/5 stars
Chicago Tribune	3/4 stars
Entertainment Weekly	B−
Music Week	3/5 stars
Muzik	(Springer) (Jones)
Q	3/5 stars
Rolling Stone	3.5/5 stars
USA Today	2/4 stars

Greg Kot, writing for Chicago Tribune, noted that with Your Secret Love "Vandross' brilliance as the most artful soul singer of his time has never been more apparent. Your Secret Love is stuffed with ballads [...] Vandross keeps the tunes simmering, however, with a voice that never calls attention to its spectacular range but rather engages in a nuanced dialogue with his veteran musicians, backing vocalists and duet partners." AllMusic editor William Ruhlmann found that the album had "much in common with its predecessors. It is filled with midtempo love ballads in which Vandross emotes over tasteful R&B gospel arrangements, mostly writing his own songs, but also finding room for a couple of pop favorites [...] As steeped as he is in the nomenclature of R&B vocal expressionism, Vandross as usual sounds more self-involved than romantically devoted."

J.R.Reynolds from Billboard wrote that Your Secret Love "demonstrates a practiced versatility via trademark style tracks, an obligatory cover tune, a genre-bending song, and guest artists." David Browne from Entertainment Weekly noted that the "latest batch of love songs are mostly serviceable, and the studio-musician sterility of the music makes nearly every track [...] seem interchangeable. Unrequited passion will always be in style, but Vandross needs to seduce some new sounds as desperately as he does the partners in his songs." The Advocate's Barry Walters called Your Secret Love "the singer's most low-key, nearly snoozy album. He felt that "like most Vandross albums, Your Secret Love has its share of borrowed songs personalized by the singer's patented groans, croons, and cries."

== Track listing ==
Your Secret Love track listing
No.	Title	Writer(s)	Producer(s)	Length
1.	"Your Secret Love"	Luther Vandross; Reed Vertelney	Vandross	4:12
2.	"Love Don't Love You Anymore"	Vandross	Vandross	5:12
3.	"It's Hard for Me to Say"	Vandross; Skip Anderson	Vandross	4:34
4.	"Crazy Love"	David Lasley; Robin Lerner; Marsha Malamet; Allan Rich	Vandross	5:13
5.	"I Can Make It Better"	Vandross; Marcus Miller	Vandross; Miller	5:35
6.	"Too Proud to Beg"	Vandross; Vertelney	Vandross	4:50
7.	"I Can't Wait No Longer (Let's Do This)" (featuring Deidra "Spin" Roper of Salt-n-Pepa)	Miller; Dee Dee Roper	Vandross; Miller	5:39
8.	"Nobody to Love"	Vandross; Miller	Vandross; Miller	5:45
9.	"Whether or Not the World Gets Better" (featuring Lisa Fischer)	Vandross	Vandross	5:31
10.	"This Time I'm Right"	Vandross	Vandross	5:07
11.	"Knocks Me Off My Feet"	Stevie Wonder	Vandross; Nat Adderley, Jr.	3:44
12.	"Goin' Out of My Head"	Teddy Randazzo; Bob Weinstein	Vandross; Adderley	5:17
Total length:				60:14

== Personnel ==
- Luther Vandross – lead vocals, vocal arrangements, arrangements (1, 5, 8), backing vocals (6)
- Reed Vertelney – keyboards (1, 5), string programming (1), bass (1, 5), drum programming (1), arrangements (1, 5), drums (5), strings (5)
- John "Skip" Anderson – additional keyboards (1), strings (1, 3), bass (1, 2, 3), arrangements (1, 5, 8), keyboards (2), synth strings (2), drums (2, 3, 8), acoustic piano (3), synthesizers (8), synth orchestra and arrangements (8),
- Ivan Hampden Jr. – additional programming (1), drums (9, 10), percussion (9)
- Marcus Miller – all instruments (4, 6), programming (4, 6, 7), arrangements (4, 6, 7), backing vocals (6), keyboards (7), guitar (7), bass (8, 10)
- David Ward – additional programming (4), programming (7)
- Nat Adderley Jr. – vibraphone solo (7), acoustic piano (8, 10), arrangements (8, 9, 10), keyboards (9), synth bass (9)
- Paul Jackson Jr. – guitar (1, 2, 3, 5, 8, 9, 10), additional guitar (4), acoustic guitar (7)
- Yogi Horton – drums (8)
- Paulinho da Costa – percussion (2, 3, 5, 8)
- Kirk Whalum – saxophone solo (10)
- Leon Pendarvis – string arrangements (2, 4)
- Alfred Brown – music contractor (4, 9, 10)
- Tawatha Agee – backing vocals (1–5, 7, 10)
- Paulette McWilliams – backing vocals (1–5, 7, 10)
- Cindy Mizelle – backing vocals (1–5, 7, 10)
- Brenda White-King – backing vocals (1–5, 7, 10)
- Lisa Fischer – backing vocals (2, 4), lead vocals (9)
- David Lasley – backing vocals (2)
- Cheryl Lynn – backing vocals (2)
- Cissy Houston – backing vocals (4, 10)
- Deidra "Spin" Roper – rap (7)
- Fonzi Thornton – backing vocals (10), vocal contractor

=== Production ===
- Luther Vandross – producer, executive producer
- Marcus Miller – producer (4, 6, 7)
- Nat Adderley Jr. – producer (9, 10)
- Ray Bardani – recording (1, 2, 3, 5, 8, 9, 10), mixing
- David Ward – recording (4, 6, 7)
- Al Schmitt – orchestra recording
- Mike Baumgartner – assistant engineer
- Kyle Bess – assistant engineer
- Greg Denon – assistant engineer
- Mark Eshelman – assistant engineer
- Paul Falcone – assistant engineer
- Sue McLean – assistant engineer
- Pat Weber – assistant engineer
- Max Risenhoover – digital editing, sound designer (1, 2, 3, 5, 8, 9, 10)
- Ted Jensen – mastering
- Bibi Green – production coordinator (for Marcus Miller)
- Pat Dorn – album coordinator
- George Corsillo – art direction, design
- Norman Jean Roy – photography
- Guzman (Connie Hansen and Russell Peacock) – front cover photography
- The Marsha Burns Co. / Gallin-Morey Associates – management
- Max Szadek – personal assistant

Studios

- Recorded at Camel Island Studios (Los Angeles, California) and Sony Scoring Stage (Culver City, California).
- Mixed at The Hit Factory (New York City, New York).
- Mastered at Sterling Sound (New York City, New York).

== Charts ==
=== Weekly charts ===
Weekly chart performance for Your Secret Love
Chart (1996)	Peak position
Australian Albums (ARIA)	145
Canada Top Albums/CDs (RPM)	18
Dutch Albums (Album Top 100)	61
Scottish Albums (Official Charts)	58
UK Albums (Official Charts)	14
UK R&B Albums (Official Charts)	3
US Billboard 200	9
US Top R&B/Hip-Hop Albums (Billboard)	2

=== Year-end charts ===
Year-end chart performance for Your Secret Love
Chart (1996)	Position
US Top R&B/Hip-Hop Albums (Billboard)	61

== Certifications ==
Certifications for Your Secret Love
Region	Certification	Certified units/sales
Canada (Music Canada)	Gold	50,000^{^}
United Kingdom (BPI)	Silver	60,000^{^}
United States (RIAA)	Platinum	1,000,000^{^}
^{^} Shipments figures based on certification alone.
