= Simply Amazing =

Single by Trey Songz

from the album Chapter V
- Released: August 3, 2012
- Recorded: 2011
- Genre: Pop; pop rock; R&B
- Length: 4:01
- Label: Atlantic
- Songwriters: Tremaine Neverson; Najja McDwell; Troy Taylor; Christopher Umana
- Producers: Troy Taylor; Christopher Umana

Trey Songz singles chronology
"2 Reasons" (2012)	"Simply Amazing" (2012)	"Bounce It" (2013)

"Simply Amazing" is a song by American recording artist Trey Songz for his fifth studio album, Chapter V (2012). It was written by Songz, Najja McDwell with its producers Troy Taylor and Christopher Umana. It was released as the third single from the album in Europe on August 3, 2012. "Simply Amazing" is a pop and pop rock song built as an acoustic-driven, midtempo ballad, while also having R&B beats and Songz' smooth vocals.

Lyrically, "Simply Amazing" is a love song about someone who rekindled the protagonist's belief in love. It received generally positive reviews from music critics, who praised his seductive vocals as well as its pop chorus. Critics also found similarities with Usher songs and predicted it would be his crossover hit. It indeed charted very high in the United Kingdom, peaking at number eight and becoming his first UK top-ten hit.

== Background and release ==
After releasing his fourth studio album, Passion, Pain & Pleasure (2010), Trey Songz released his first EP, Inevitable, in 2011. The EP features five songs that were recorded, but not included on his then upcoming album, Chapter V which was set to be released in 2012. According to him, the album was "a representation of his past, present and future musically." Its lead-single, "Heart Attack", was released on March 26, 2012, followed by "2 Reasons", the album's second single, released on June 12, 2012. "Simply Amazing" was then released as "Chapter V"'s second single in Europe on August 3, 2012, and in the UK on August 12, 2012.

== Composition and lyrics ==
"Simply Amazing" was written by Trey Songz, Najja McDowell, Troy Taylor and Christopher 'C4' Umana, with the latter two also serving as the producers of the song. It is a pop and pop rock acoustic guitar-driven song, with a finger-snapping R&B beat, soft guitars and a pulsing beat, underlined by Songz' smooth vocal. Lyrically, "Simply Amazing" finds the singer soulfully rhapsodizing about a woman who rekindled his belief in love, as he declares his undying love for his lady. According to Songz, "Simply Amazing" is one of the most important songs of his career, also noting that it defined his growth as an artist.

== Critical reception ==
"Simply Amazing" received mostly positive reviews from music critics. Taj Rani of Billboard claimed that "Simply Amazing" is a result of an experiment where Shania Twain and the Backstreet Boys birthed a mainstream ballad," also noting that "Trey's seductive vocals bring a warm welcome into the pop realm." While calling it "a certified hit", Maz of MTV News noted that the song is "melodic and reminiscent of early Usher." In similar vein, Jon Caramanica of The New York Times wrote that the song "has the pop pomp of recent Usher hits." Ken Capobianco of The Boston Globe indicated that the song "might be the big crossover pop hit that exposes him to a whole new audience." Nathan S. of DJ Booth agreed, claiming that it "goes for that crossover appeal with an acoustic guitar-driven cut that Songz does his damnedest to make the kind of song just as likely to get played on VH1 as BET." While Richard, also of DJ Booth, praised its producers for "provid[ing] an appropriately sweeping backdrop for the artist’s heartfelt vocals."

Alex Macpherson of The Guardian felt that the song has an "anthemic pop chorus", while Glen Gamboa of Newsday described it as a "rockish anthem". Elysa Gardner of USA Today picked the song as one of the tracks on the album to "download" and website Rap-Up chose it as one of the publication's favorite tracks. While reviewing Chapter V, Lewis Corner of Digital Spy wrote that the song is a " mid-tempo ballad that will seduce many a swooning teenager." Robert Copsey, of the same publication, wrote a separate review of the song, analyzing that "it's not his strongest offering as he sings smitten about losing himself under the covers with his freshest catch over an all-too-familiar finger-snapping R&B beat," also noting that "it lacks the bite of recent cuts 'Bottoms Up' or 'Heart Attack'."

== Music video ==
The music video for "Simply Amazing" was filmed in early July 2012 and was directed by Justin Francis. The video premiered on July 23, 2012.

== Track listing ==
Digital download
No.	Title	Length
1.	"Simply Amazing"	4:01

UK digital single
No.	Title	Length
1.	"Simply Amazing"	3:59
2.	"Simply Amazing" (Andy Durrant and Steve Moore UK Remix)	6:30
3.	"Simply Amazing" (Andy Durrant and Steve Moore UK Remix) (Radio Edit)	4:00

== Charts ==
In the United Kingdom, "Simply Amazing" became Songz' first top ten hit, entering the UK Singles Chart at number 8. It also became his first number 1 single on the UK R&B Chart.

=== Weekly charts ===
Chart (2012–2013)	Peak position
Ireland (IRMA)	60
Japan Hot 100 (Billboard)	70
UK Singles (Official Charts)	8
UK Hip Hop/R&B (Official Charts)	1
US Bubbling Under Hot 100 (Billboard)	3
US Hot R&B/Hip-Hop Songs (Billboard)	34
US Pop Airplay (Billboard)	33
US Rhythmic Airplay (Billboard)	15

=== Year-end charts ===
Chart (2012)	Position
UK Singles (OCC)	177

== Certifications ==
Region	Certification	Certified units/sales
United Kingdom (BPI)	Silver	200,000^{‡}
^{‡} Sales+streaming figures based on certification alone.

== Release history ==
Region	Date	Format	Label
Germany	August 3, 2012	Digital download	Atlantic Records
Austria	August 3, 2012	Digital download	Atlantic Records
Switzerland	August 3, 2012	Digital download	Atlantic Records
United Kingdom	August 12, 2012	Digital download	Atlantic Records
United States	January 8, 2013	Rhythmic radio	Atlantic Records
