= Gotta Go Solo =

2004 single by Patti LaBelle

Single by Patti LaBelle featuring Ronald Isley

from the album Classic Moments
- Released: 2004
- Length: 4:02
- Label: Def Soul Classics
- Songwriters: Gordon Chambers; Patti LaBelle; Troy Taylor
- Producers: Chambers; Taylor

Patti LaBelle singles chronology
| "New Day" (2004) | "Gotta Go Solo" (2004) | "Ain't No Way" (2005) |

"Gotta Go Solo" is a song recorded by American singer Patti LaBelle featuring Ronald Isley. It was written by LaBelle, Gordon Chambers, and Troy Taylor, while production was helmed by Chambers and Taylor. "Gotta Go Solo" was released as a standalone single in 2004 and later included as a bonus track on the Japanese edition of her 2005 studio album Classic Moments. It peaked at number one on the US Adult R&B Songs chart.

== Track listings ==
Digital single
| No. | Title | Length |
|---|---|---|
| 1. | "Gotta Go Solo" (Radio Edit) | 4:01 |
| 2. | "Gotta Go Solo" (Extended Mix) | 4:41 |
| 3. | "Gotta Go Solo" (Instrumental Version) | 4:44 |

== Credits and personnel ==
Credits adapted from the liner notes of Classic Moments.

- Gordon Chambers – producer, writer
- Jean-Marie Horvat – mixing engineer
- Ernie Isley – guitar
- Patti Labelle – vocals, writer
- Troy Taylor – instruments, producer, writer

== Charts ==
| Chart (2004) | Peak position |
|---|---|
| US Adult R&B Songs (Billboard) | 1 |
| US Billboard Hot 100 | 89 |
| US Hot R&B/Hip-Hop Songs (Billboard) | 31 |
