= Classic Moments =

Studio album by Patti LaBelle
- Released: June 21, 2005
- Length: 60:37
- Label: Def Soul Classics
- Producer: Babyface; Michael Bearden; Gordon Chambers; The Corner Boys; Sheldon Goode; Sami McKinney; Gregg Pagani; Jason Rome; Daryl Simmons; Troy Taylor; Tomi

Patti LaBelle chronology
Timeless Journey (2004)	Classic Moments (2005)	The Gospel According to Patti LaBelle (2006)

Classic Moments is a studio album by American singer Patti LaBelle. It was her second full-length release with Island Def Jam's Def Soul Classics imprint and released on June 21, 2005, in the United States. The album features LaBelle's renditions of modern pop, soul, and R&B songs, mostly ballads, including her versions of "Love Don't Live Here Anymore", "She's Out of My Life", "Didn't I (Blow Your Mind This Time)" and "I'll Stand by You".

Released a year after LaBelle's previous album, Timeless Journey (2004), it peaked at number 24 on the US Billboard 200 and number five on Top R&B/Hip-Hop Albums, while her version of Aretha and Carolyn Franklin's "Ain't No Way", a duet with Mary J. Blige, entered the R&B charts peaking at number sixty-eight.

== Critical reception ==
Professional ratings
Review scores
Source	Rating
Allmusic	3/5 stars
People	3/4 stars
PopMatters	6/10 stars
USA Today	3/4 stars

Allmusic editor Andy Kellman called Classic Moments "an all-covers affair with a few pleasant surprises. While it won't shock fans to hear LaBelle in great form, some of the material the singer takes on couldn't have been all that expected. Soul classics like "Didn't I (Blow Your Mind This Time)" (hindered by a rather plain arrangement) and "Love Don't Live Here Anymore" (sounding entirely modern, even with the disco zaps and galactic keyboard effects) are natural picks, but a few other songs make this more than an average covers album, which are often spat out like contractual obligations [...] The set's not spotless, but it's more than a stopgap release and will please LaBelle's followers." People wrote that "with her range and power, LaBelle can make any song her own [...] Not everything works, including her duet with Elton John on “Your Song,” and the disc could use more uptempo cuts like the funky “You Gonna Make Me Love Somebody Else.” Still, there are more than enough memorable moments."

== Track listing ==
No.	Title	Writer(s)	Producer(s)	Length
1.	"Ain't No Way" (featuring Mary J. Blige)	Aretha Franklin; Carolyn Franklin	Babyface; Daryl Simmons; Gregg Pagani	4:29
2.	"He's Out of My Life"	Tom Bahler	Babyface; Simmons; Pagani	3:46
3.	"Didn't I (Blow Your Mind This Time)"	Thom Bell; William Hart	Michael Bearden; Sami McKinney; Sheldon Goode	4:32
4.	"Love Don't Live Here Anymore"	Miles Gregory	Babyface; Simmons; Pagani	3:56
5.	"I Keep Forgetting"	Jerry Leiber; Mike Stoller; Michael McDonald	Babyface; Simmons; Pagani	3:16
6.	"Love Ballad"	Skip Scarborough	Babyface; Simmons; Pagani	4:00
7.	"I Can't Make You Love Me"	Allen Shamblin; Mike Reid	Bearden; McKinney; Goode	6:02
8.	"Your Song" (featuring Elton John)	Elton John; Bernie Taupin	Bearden; McKinney; Goode	5:23
9.	"I'll Write a Song for You"	Al McKay; Philip Bailey; Steve Beckmeier	Bearden; McKinney; Goode	5:23
10.	"Silly"	Clarence McDonald; Deniece Williams; Fritz Baskett	Babyface; Simmons; Pagani	5:12
11.	"I'll Stand by You"	Chrissie Hynde; Tom Kelly; Billy Steinberg	Bearden; McKinney; Goode	4:24
12.	"You Gonna Make Me Love Somebody Else"	Kenneth Gamble; Leon Huff	Bearden; McKinney; Goode	4:57
Total length:				55:20

Bonus track
No.	Title	Writer(s)	Producer(s)	Length
13.	"Land of the Living" (featuring Kristine W)	Kristine Weitz; Rob Dougan; Roland Armstrong	McKinney; Tomi	5:17
Total length:				60:37

Japan bonus tracks
No.	Title	Writer(s)	Producer(s)	Length
13.	"Land of the Living" (featuring Kristine W)	Kristine Weitz; Rob Dougan; Roland Armstrong	McKinney; Tomi	5:17
14.	"New Day"	LaBelle; Pierre Medor; Dwayne Nesmith; Tiffany Palmer; Carlos Ricketts; Jason Rome	Rome; The Corner Boys	3:19
15.	"Gotta Go Solo" (featuring Ronald Isley)	Gordon Chambers; Patti Labelle; Troy Taylor	Chambers; Taylor	4:02
Total length:				67:58

== Charts ==
Chart (2005)	Peak position
US Billboard 200	24
US Top R&B/Hip-Hop Albums (Billboard)	5
