= Love Is On the Way =

Love Is On the Way may refer to:

- Love Is On the Way (album), a 1998 compilation album by American R&B/soul singer Luther Vandross
- "Love Is On the Way" (song), a 1992 song by American rock band Saigon Kick
- "Love Is On the Way", a song by Billy Porter, released on The First Wives Club soundtrack, later covered by Celine Dion
- "Love Is On the Way", a song by R. Kelly from the 1995 album R. Kelly
- "Love is On the Way", a song by Natalie Cole from the 1985 album Dangerous
- "Love is On the Way", a song by Dave Koz from the 1999 album The Dance
- "Love is On the Way", a 2004 single by Little Louie Vega and Blaze
- "Love Is On the Way", a song by Austins Bridge from the 2010 album Times Like These
- "Love Is On The Way", a song by Viktor Lazlo from the 1996 album Back to Front

== See also ==
- "Good Love is On the Way", a song by the John Mayer Trio from the 2005 album Try!
- "My Love Is On the Way", a song from the 1954 musical The Golden Apple
