= Troy Taylor (music producer) =

American record producer and songwriter

- Also known as: Pinkie; Troy Taylor U Da Goat
- Born: Troy Christopher Taylor; New Haven, Connecticut, U.S.
- Education: Hartford Conservatory
- Genres: R&B; soul; hip-hop
- Occupations: Record producer; singer; songwriter
- Labels: Songbook Entertainment; Motown
- Formerly of: The Characters

Troy Christopher Taylor is an American record producer, singer, and songwriter. He is best known for discovering and mentoring R&B singer Trey Songz. Taylor was a member of the production collective the Characters before founding the record label and recording studio Songbook Entertainment in 2002. Songz signed with the label the following year, releasing eight albums with the label in a joint venture with Atlantic Records.

Throughout his career, Taylor has also produced for other R&B acts including Chris Brown, the Isley Brothers, Aretha Franklin, Patti LaBelle, K. Michelle, Tank, Whitney Houston, Zara Larsson and Boyz II Men, among others.

== Career ==
=== Musical upbringing ===
Taylor was born in suburban New Haven, Connecticut into a family of musicians, resulting in exposure to music at a very early age. He started by singing in local talent shows, which evolved into playing keyboards as well as learning how to listen to and understand music. He would later graduate from Hartford Conservatory in 1988, studying jazz theory and record production. Anxious to enter the music industry, Taylor regrettably signed a record deal with an independent label in New York in his youth without the assistance of an attorney. Record executive Timmy Regisford would subsequently buy out Taylor's contract, and sign him to Motown Records.

=== 1990s: Motown Deal and "The Characters" ===
Taylor was signed in early 1990 at the age of 21 to a solo recording deal with Motown, but decided to instead explore songwriting and production for other artists after several fruitful sessions with a group of talented teenagers who would evolve into R&B vocal group Boyz II Men, as well as a meeting with label president Jheryl Busby and then-Vice President-A&R Regisford. Taylor would subsequently place records from his unreleased debut album on other projects he was writing for at the time, with the remaining portion of his debut album being eventually released in 2021. Two of Taylor’s debut songs, “Little Things” and “Your Love”, were placed on Boyz II Men’s debut album Cooleyhighharmony, which sold over 12 million copies. Two previously unreleased Taylor tracks, "Just A Cover Up" and "Can't Be Liked", would later appear on a 2009 Cooleyhighharmony repackage.

In the 1990s/early 2000s, Taylor was also a member of The Characters alongside fellow songwriter/producer Charles Farrar: a production collective that signed several acts to their production company Character Music Corporation, and worked with Brownstone, SWV, Darius Rucker, and Kenny Lattimore, among others. They also produced several remixes for physical singles during their tenure, including Brandy ("Best Friend") and Babyface ("Chivalry"). Their work on song "Jezzebel" from 1994 Boyz II Men album II won the duo a Grammy Award for Best R&B Album. Songwriter Johnta Austin would later join the collective after his label delayed the release of his debut album, and together the trio created award-winning hit single "Sweet Lady" for Tyrese, as well as other songs for SWV and Jason Weaver.

=== 2000-present: Songbook Entertainment and Trey Songz ===
The Characters disbanded amicably in 2002, but would continue to work together to contribute to albums from B2K and Jhené Aiko, as well as appear on the Barbershop soundtrack. Taylor would next create Songbook Entertainment, a multi-disciplinary firm meant to encompass songwriting, publishing, and the development of new artists. Taylor met singer Tremaine Neverson in 2000 while he was participating in various Virginia talent shows, and he would become Taylor's first signee. Taylor would also work with former IMx member Marques Houston on his solo debut. While developing Neverson over the next five years, Taylor would also be commissioned to work on projects from Whitney Houston, Aretha Franklin, Patti Labelle, Ginuwine, and the Isley Brothers, receiving recognition from the R&B wing of the Grammys for his contributions to 2003 Aretha Franklin album So Damn Happy. Taylor would later reminisce about recording sessions in Franklin's home studio, Franklin's ability to record ten full songs without breaks, as well as recording his time producing for Houston for posterity in various interviews and publications.

In 2016, Taylor was tasked with writing and producing songs based on scripted plotlines for Lee Daniels' Fox television series Star. In 2020, Taylor worked with gospel artist Koryn Hawthorne on her second album I Am, contributing two singles ("Speak To Me", "Pray") that charted on the Billboard Gospel Charts. He reunited with Characters collective member Austin to co-write his contributions to Hawthorne's album.

== Discography ==
- Shelved Debut Album (1990/1991)
- The 90s Demos EP (2021)

== Songwriting and production credits ==
Credits are courtesy of Discogs, Spotify, and AllMusic.

Title	Year	Artist	Album
"Every Little Thing About You"	1990	Today	The New Formula
"Self Centered"	1990	Today	The New Formula
"Home Is Where You Belong"	1990	Today	The New Formula
"Gonna Make You Mine"	1990	Today	The New Formula
"Little Things"	1991	Boyz II Men	Cooleyhighharmony
"Your Love"	1991	Boyz II Men	Cooleyhighharmony
"Just A Cover Up"	1991	Boyz II Men	Cooleyhighharmony (2009 Expanded Edition)
"Can't Be Liked"	1991	Boyz II Men	Cooleyhighharmony (2009 Expanded Edition)
"Chivalry" (The Characters Remix)	1991	Babyface	A Closer Look
"I'll Be There For You"	1991	Lateasha	Lateasha
"Mature Love"	1991	Keisha Jackson	Keisha
"All Night Lovin'"	1991	Keisha Jackson	Keisha
"All Night Lovin' Interlude"	1991	Keisha Jackson	Keisha
"Step by Step (Gonna Make You Mine)"	1992	Wendy Moten	Wendy Moten
"Take Me Back to Love Again"	1992	Kathy Sledge	Heart
"I've Gotta Have It"	1992	3rd Avenue	Let's Talk About Love
"The Minute You Fall In Love"	1992	3rd Avenue	Let's Talk About Love
"I'm Calling You (Do-Po-Liddle-Lo-Le-Yeah)"	1992	OSCAR	Spotlight
"Just For You"	1992	OSCAR	Spotlight
"Let Me Make It Better"	1992	OSCAR	Spotlight
"I'll Be There For You"	1992	OSCAR	Spotlight
"Spotlight"	1992	OSCAR	Spotlight
"Keep Touching Me"	1992	OSCAR	Spotlight
"How I Spend My Time"	1992	OSCAR	Spotlight
"Give Me A Reason"	1992	OSCAR	Spotlight
"Just Being With You"	1992	Countess Vaughn	Countess
"Once More"	1992	Countess Vaughn	Countess
"Skyy's The Limit"	1992	Skyy	Nearer To You
"Work It Out"	1993	Perfect Gentlemen	The Perfect Gentlemen
"Don't Go Nowhere"	1993	Riff	To Whom It May Concern
"Adjust Your Love"	1993	Riff	To Whom It May Concern
"Adjust Your Love (Interlude)"	1993	Riff	To Whom It May Concern
"Floating	1994	Debelah Morgan	Debelah
"Jezzebel"	1994	Boyz II Men	II
"(Seek And You'll Find) The Kinda Right Baby"	1994	Groove U	Tender Love
"Old Becomes New"	1994	Groove U	Tender Love
"Call And I'll Answer"	1994	Groove U	Tender Love
"Pass It Over"	1994	Fourmula	Non-album single
"I Can't Tell You Why"	1995	Brownstone	From the Bottom Up
"Best Friend" (The Characters R&B Mix featuring Channel Live)	1995	Brandy	Brandy
"I'm Sorry"	1995	Solo	Solo
"My Cherie Amour"	1995	Tony Thompson	Sexsational
"Come Over"	1995	Tony Thompson	Sexsational
"Goodbye Eyes"	1995	Tony Thompson	Sexsational
"Love Today"	1995	Vertical Hold	Head First
"Love In An Elevator"	1996	Johnny Gill	Let's Get the Mood Right
"Simply Say I Love U" (Featuring Stevie Wonder)	1996	Johnny Gill	Let's Get the Mood Right
"So Gentle" (Featuring Ronnie DeVoe)	1996	Johnny Gill	Let's Get the Mood Right
"Get Down Like Dat"	1996	702	No Doubt
"No Doubt"	1996	702	No Doubt
"Show You My Love"	1996	702	No Doubt
"All I Want"	1996	702	No Doubt
"Just Let Me Know"	1996	Horace Brown	Horace Brown
"Realize"	1996	Jason Weaver	Stay With Me (Shelved)
"Your Body's Callin'"	1996	Norman Brown	Better Days Ahead
"Facts of Love"	1996	Norman Brown	Better Days Ahead
"Love Like This" (Featuring Lil' Cease)	1997	SWV	Release Some Tension
"Lose Myself"	1997	SWV	Release Some Tension
"Here For You"	1997	SWV	Release Some Tension
"Who Are You"	1997	Shades	Shades
"Tell Me (I'll Be Around)"	1997	Shades	Shades
"I Believe"	1997	Shades	Shades
"How Deep Is Your Love"	1997	Shades	Shades
"Time Will Reveal"	1997	Shades	Shades
"All He's Supposed to Be"	1997	Johnny Gill	The 6th Man (soundtrack)
"Jam Knock"	1997	Brian McKnight	Anytime
"Dance Wit Me" (Featuring Doug E. Fresh)	1998	Miss Jones	The Other Woman
"Smooth"	1998	Miss Jones	The Other Woman
"In And Out Of My Life"	1998	Ali	Crucial / Bitter Honey
"Once A Fool"	1998	Destiny's Child & William Floyd	eMusic Presents NFL Jams
"Work It Out"	1998	Boyz II Men & Garrison Hearst	eMusic Presents NFL Jams
"Let's Get It Started"	1998	Johnny Gill & Corey Harris	eMusic Presents NFL Jams
"Sweet Lady"	1999	Tyrese	Tyrese
"What'cha Gonna Do"	1999	Eternal	Eternal
"Treat Me Like a Lady"	1999	Eternal	Eternal
"Absent From You"	1999	Eternal	Eternal
"He Is"	1999	Eternal	Eternal
"Never Let You Go Away"	1999	Rome	Thank You (Shelved)
"Do It Like Us"	1999	Rudy	Non-album single
"Come Correct"	2000	Before Dark	Daydreamin'
"Can We Make Love"	2000	Profyle	Nothin' but Drama
"Candles"	2000	Pru	Pru
"Got Me High"	2000	Pru	Pru
"Can't Compare Your Love"	2000	Pru	Pru
"Sketches of Pain"	2000	Pru	Pru
"Hold On"	2000	L.V.	How Long
"Just Because"	2000	F.A.T.E	For All That's Endured
"Weekend"	2001	Kenny Lattimore	Weekend
"Baby You're the One"	2001	Kenny Lattimore	Weekend
"Can You Feel Me" (Featuring Shanice)	2001	Kenny Lattimore	Weekend
"If Love Is What You Want"	2001	Kenny Lattimore	Weekend
"Right Down to It"	2001	Kenny Lattimore	Weekend
"Pretty Girl"	2001	Smash Task	Selections From "The Dirty D.I.S.T.R.I.C.T."
"Crave"	2001	4Shades	4Shades
"Unashamed"	2002	Whitney Houston	Just Whitney
"Christmas Party" (Featuring Treach)	2002	3LW	Naughty or Nice
"You Can Get It" (Featuring Makeba Riddick)	2002	B2K	Pandemonium!
"Why I Love You"	2002	B2K	Pandemonium!
"What's Come Over Me?"	2002	Glenn Lewis & Amel Larrieux	Barbershop (soundtrack)
"Baby Girl (Terri's Theme)"	2002	B2K	Barbershop (soundtrack)
"He Couldn't Kiss"	2002	Jhené Aiko	B2K: The Remixes – Volume 1
"Baby Girl"	2002	B2K	B2K
"You"	2002	Ruff Endz	Someone to Love You
"Sexy Lover"	2002	Darius Rucker	Back to Then
"When's the Last Time"	2002	Darius Rucker	Back to Then
"The Only Thing Missin"	2003	Aretha Franklin	So Damn Happy
"Holdin' On"	2003	Aretha Franklin	So Damn Happy
"No Matter What" (Featuring Mary J. Blige)	2003	Aretha Franklin	So Damn Happy
"The First Noel"	2003	Whitney Houston	One Wish: The Holiday Album
"The Christmas Song (Chestnuts Roasting On An Open Fire)"	2003	Whitney Houston	One Wish: The Holiday Album
"Because of You"	2003	Marques Houston	MH
"Can I Call You"	2003	Marques Houston	MH
"Bedda to Have Loved"	2003	Ginuwine	The Senior
"On My Way"/"Sex (Interlude)"	2003	Ginuwine	The Senior
"Our First Born"	2003	Ginuwine	The Senior
"Big Plans" (Featuring Method Man)	2003	Ginuwine	The Senior
"Do Ya" (With Daniel Bedingfield)	2004	Lionel Richie	Just for You
"Something More"	2004	Patti LaBelle	Timeless Journey
"Good Lovin"	2004	Patti LaBelle	Timeless Journey
"I'm Leaving"	2004	Frankee	The Good, the Bad, the Ugly
"Made It Back"	2004	The O'Jays	Imagination
"Separate Ways"	2004	The O'Jays	Imagination
"Touch You There"	2004	Gordon Chambers	Introducing...
"Never Fall In Love"	2004	Gordon Chambers	Introducing...
"Slippin' Away"	2004	Gordon Chambers	Introducing...
"My Imagination"	2004	Gordon Chambers	Introducing...
"Always Be Proud"	2004	Gordon Chambers	Introducing...
"A Message from Aretha"	2005	Trey Songz	I Gotta Make It
"Gotta Make It" (featuring Twista)	2005	Trey Songz	I Gotta Make It
"Cheat on You"	2005	Trey Songz	I Gotta Make It
"Gotta Go"	2005	Trey Songz	I Gotta Make It
"Ooo"	2005	Trey Songz	I Gotta Make It
"All The Ifs"	2005	Trey Songz	I Gotta Make It
"From a Woman's Hand"	2005	Trey Songz	I Gotta Make It
"Kinda Lovin'"	2005	Trey Songz	I Gotta Make It
"Comin' for You"	2005	Trey Songz	I Gotta Make It
"Just Wanna Cut (Prelude)"	2005	Trey Songz	I Gotta Make It
"Just Wanna Cut"	2005	Trey Songz	I Gotta Make It
"In the Middle"	2005	Trey Songz	I Gotta Make It
"Make Love Tonight"	2005	Trey Songz	I Gotta Make It
"Hatin' Love"	2005	Trey Songz	I Gotta Make It
"Gotta Go (Reprise)"	2005	Trey Songz	I Gotta Make It
"Gotta Make It (Remix)" (Featuring Aretha Franklin & Juvenile)	2005	Trey Songz	I Gotta Make It
"Better Than Gold"	2005	Yolanda Adams	Day by Day
"I Found My Everything" (Featuring Raphael Saadiq)	2005	Mary J. Blige	The Breakthrough
"Gotta Go Solo" (Featuring Ronald Isley)	2005	Patti LaBelle	Classic Moments
"Just Came Here to Chill"	2006	The Isley Brothers	Baby Makin' Music
"Heaven Hooked Us Up"	2006	The Isley Brothers	Baby Makin' Music
"You Help Me Write This Song"	2006	The Isley Brothers	Baby Makin' Music
"Where Love Begins" (Featuring Yolanda Adams)	2006	Patti LaBelle	The Gospel According to Patti LaBelle
"Walking Away" (Featuring CeCe Winans)	2006	Patti LaBelle	The Gospel According to Patti LaBelle
"Long Gone Missin'"	2007	Trey Songz	Trey Day
"No Clothes On"	2007	Trey Songz	Trey Day
"Wonder Woman"	2007	Trey Songz	Trey Day
"Sex for Yo Stereo"	2007	Trey Songz	Trey Day
"Last Time"	2007	Trey Songz	Trey Day
"Grub On"	2007	Trey Songz	Trey Day
"Role Play"	2007	Trey Songz	Trey Day
"Fades Away"	2007	Trey Songz	Trey Day
"Husband"	2007	Lil' Mo	Pain & Paper
"Can't Bring Me Down"	2008	Karina Pasian	First Love
"Panty Droppa (Intro)"	2009	Trey Songz	Ready
"Neighbors Know My Name"	2009	Trey Songz	Ready
"Say Aah" (Featuring Fabolous)	2009	Trey Songz	Ready
"LOL Smiley Face" (Featuring Gucci Mane & Soulja Boy)	2009	Trey Songz	Ready
"Ready to Make Luv"	2009	Trey Songz	Ready
"Jupiter Love"	2009	Trey Songz	Ready
"Love Lost"	2009	Trey Songz	Ready
"Hollalude"	2009	Trey Songz	Ready
"Holla If Ya Need Me"	2009	Trey Songz	Ready
"Yo Side of the Bed"	2009	Trey Songz	Ready
"Scratchin' Me Up"	2009	Trey Songz	Ready
"You Belong to Me"	2009	Trey Songz	Ready
"Showerlude"	2009	Trey Songz	Anticipation
"You Belong To Me"	2009	Trey Songz	Anticipation
"On Top"	2009	Trey Songz	Anticipation
"Yo Side of the Bed"	2009	Trey Songz	Anticipation
"Here We Go Again (Intro)"	2010	Trey Songz	Passion, Pain & Pleasure
"Love Faces"	2010	Trey Songz	Passion, Pain & Pleasure
"Massage"	2010	Trey Songz	Passion, Pain & Pleasure
"Alone"	2010	Trey Songz	Passion, Pain & Pleasure
"Pain (Interlude)"	2010	Trey Songz	Passion, Pain & Pleasure
"Can't Be Friends"	2010	Trey Songz	Passion, Pain & Pleasure
"Please Return My Call"	2010	Trey Songz	Passion, Pain & Pleasure
"Made to Be Together"	2010	Trey Songz	Passion, Pain & Pleasure
"Pleasure (Interlude)"	2010	Trey Songz	Passion, Pain & Pleasure
"Red Lipstick"	2010	Trey Songz	Passion, Pain & Pleasure
"Doorbell"	2010	Trey Songz	Passion, Pain & Pleasure
"You Just Need Me"	2010	Trey Songz	Passion, Pain & Pleasure
"Panty Droppa (The Complete Edition)"	2010	Trey Songz	Passion, Pain & Pleasure
"Love Me Better (Here We Go Again Complete Edition)"	2010	Trey Songz	Passion, Pain & Pleasure
"Hero"	2010	Lyfe Jennings	I Still Believe
"Kitty Kitty" (Featuring Trey Songz)	2010	Plies	Goon Affiliated
"Sex Room" (Featuring Trey Songz)	2010	Ludacris	Battle of the Sexes
"Just the Way You Are"	2011	Johnny Gill	Still Winning
"It Would Be You"	2011	Johnny Gill	Still Winning
"Chapter V"	2012	Trey Songz	Chapter V
"Dive In"	2012	Trey Songz	Chapter V
"Panty Wetter"	2012	Trey Songz	Chapter V
"Playin Hard"	2012	Trey Songz	Chapter V
"2 Reasons" (Featuring T.I.)	2012	Trey Songz	Chapter V
"Hail Mary" (Featuring Jeezy & Lil Wayne)	2012	Trey Songz	Chapter V
"Don't Be Scared" (Featuring Rick Ross)	2012	Trey Songz	Chapter V
"Pretty Girl's Lie"	2012	Trey Songz	Chapter V
"Forever Yours"	2012	Trey Songz	Chapter V
"Inside Interlewd"	2012	Trey Songz	Chapter V
"Fumble"	2012	Trey Songz	Chapter V
"Without a Woman"	2012	Trey Songz	Chapter V
"Interlude4U"	2012	Trey Songz	Chapter V
"Simply Amazing"	2012	Trey Songz	Chapter V
"Check Me Out" (Featuring Diddy (entertainer) & Meek Mill)	2012	Trey Songz	Chapter V
"I Don't Really Care" (Featuring Trey Songz)	2012	Waka Flocka Flame	Triple F Life: Friends, Fans & Family
"Your One"	2012	Tank	This Is How I Feel
"Lost It All"	2012	Tank	This Is How I Feel
"My Life" (includes "The Right One" interlude)"	2013	K. Michelle	Rebellious Soul
"Can't Raise a Man"	2013	K. Michelle	Rebellious Soul
"What's Best for You"	2014	Trey Songz	Trigga
"Heat of Passion"	2014	Keyshia Cole	Point of No Return
"Push It On Me" (With Trey Songz)	2016	Kevin Hart	Kevin Hart: What Now? (The Mixtape Presents Chocolate Droppa)
"The Prelude"	2017	Trey Songz	Tremaine the Album
"Come Over"	2017	Trey Songz	Tremaine the Album
"Run Run"	2017	Tamar Braxton	Bluebird of Happiness
"Pick Me Up"	2017	Tamar Braxton	Bluebird of Happiness
"Bless Up"	2018	Koryn Hawthorne	Unstoppable
"Shut Up & Kiss Me"	2019	Maurice Moore	Bravetime Travelling
"Sexual"	2019	YK Osiris	The Golden Child
"Make Lovelude"	2019	YK Osiris	The Golden Child
"Make Love"	2019	YK Osiris	The Golden Child
"Closer" (Featuring Jah Vinci)	2019	YK Osiris	The Golden Child
"Everything You Do"	2019	YK Osiris	The Golden Child
"Be My Guest"	2020	Trey Songz	Back Home
"Save It"	2020	Trey Songz	Back Home
"Hands On"	2020	Trey Songz	Back Home
"Lost & Found"	2020	Trey Songz	Back Home
"Circles"	2020	Trey Songz	Back Home
"Round & Round"	2020	Trey Songz	Back Home
"Cats Got My Tongue"	2020	Trey Songz	Back Home
"On Top of Me"	2020	Trey Songz	Back Home
"Nobody's Watchin"	2020	Trey Songz	Back Home
"Tug of War"	2020	Trey Songz	Back Home
"All This Love"	2020	Trey Songz	Back Home
"OG Lovelude"	2020	Trey Songz	Back Home
"2020 Riots: How Many Times"	2020	Trey Songz	Back Home
"I Know a Love"	2020	Trey Songz	Back Home
"Noah Love"	2020	Trey Songz	Back Home
"Insecure"	2020	Queen Naija	Missunderstood
"Passionate"	2020	Queen Naija	Missunderstood
"Speak To Me"	2020	Koryn Hawthorne	I Am
"Pray"	2020	Koryn Hawthorne	I Am
"Black And White" (Featuring Ari Lennox)	2020	Nasty C	Zulu Man with Some Power
"Cater" (With 2 Chainz)	2022	Tink	Pillow Talk
"Drunk Text'n" (With Layton Greene)	2022	Tink	Pillow Talk
"News" (With Russ)	2022	Tink	Pillow Talk
"Fast Car"	2022	Syd	Broken Hearts Club

== Guest appearances ==
List of guest appearances, with other performing artists, showing year released and album name
Title	Year	Other performer(s)	Album
"Win You Over"	1994	Debelah Morgan	Debelah

== Awards and nominations ==
Year	Awarding Body	Award	Result	Ref
1995	37th Annual Grammy Awards	Grammy Award for Best R&B Album (II)	Won	
2000	ASCAP Pop Awards	Award-Winning Song ("Sweet Lady")	Won	
2000	ASCAP Rhythm & Soul Awards	Award-Winning Song ("Sweet Lady")	Won	
2012	BMI Awards	Producer Of The Year	Won	
2022	BMI Trailblazers of Gospel Music Awards	Gospel Song of the Year ("Speak To Me")	Won	
