= Gotta Go (Trey Songz song) =

Single by Trey Songz

from the album I Gotta Make It
- Released: July 23, 2005
- Recorded: 2004
- Genre: R&B
- Length: 4:07 (album version); 3:50 (radio edit)
- Label: Atlantic
- Songwriter(s): Tremaine Neverson, Troy Taylor, Marvin Eugene Smith
- Producer(s): Troy Taylor

Trey Songz singles chronology
"Gotta Make It" (2005)	"Gotta Go" (2005)	"Girl Tonite" (2005)

"Gotta Go" is an R&B song written by Trey Songz, Troy Taylor and Marvin Eugene Smith and performed by American R&B singer-songwriter Trey Songz, released by Atlantic Records on July 23, 2005 as the second single from his debut album, I Gotta Make It.

The song peaked at number 67 on the US Billboard Hot 100, and on the R&B charts at number 11, becoming his second Top 40 R&B hit.

== Music video ==
The accompanying music video was released in October 2005, directed by Vem. It features a cameo from fellow R&B singer and Virginia native Chris Brown.

== Charts ==
=== Weekly charts ===
Chart (2005–2006)	Peak position
US Billboard Hot 100	67
US Hot R&B/Hip-Hop Songs (Billboard)	11

=== Year-end charts ===
Chart (2006)	Position
US Hot R&B/Hip-Hop Songs (Billboard)	37

== Track listing ==
CD Single (1799707; Released 2 March 2009)

1. "Gotta Go" (Radio Mix) — 3:08
2. "Baby It's Time" — 3:50
