= I Gotta Make It =

Studio album by Trey Songz
- Released: July 26, 2005
- Genres: R&B; hip hop soul
- Length: 57:58
- Label: Atlantic
- Producers: The BeatBanggahz; Warryn Campbell; Ron G.; Kim "Kookie" Hoglund; Bei Maejor; Organized Noize; J.R. Rotem; Trey Songz; Scott Storch; Troy Taylor

Trey Songz chronology
I Gotta Make It (2005)	Trey Day (2007)

Singles from I Gotta Make It
- 1. "Gotta Make It" Released: March 2, 2005; 2. "Gotta Go" Released: July 23, 2005

I Gotta Make It is the debut album by the American R&B recording artist Trey Songz. It was released on July 26, 2005, by Atlantic Records. Recording sessions for the album took place during 2004–2005, with Songz' mentor Troy Taylor overseeing most of the production. Additional producers include Warryn Campbell, Scott Storch, J.R. Rotem, Bei Maejor, and Organized Noize. Guest vocalists include the rappers Twista, Juvenile and T.I. as well as the R&B singer Aretha Franklin.

The album earned generally positive reviews from music critics who praised its production and Songz' vocal performance. I Gotta Make It debuted and peaked at number 20 on US Billboard 200, with first week sales of 40,000 copies, and eventually sold 400,000 units in the United States. The album was preceded by the release of its lead single "Gotta Make It" which charted on Hot R&B/Hip-Hop Songs. Follow-up "Gotta Go," released in July 2005, peaked at number 11 on the same chart.

== Background ==
Record producer Troy Taylor was introduced to Songz through Songz's stepfather with whom Taylor attended high school, ultimately leading to Songz signing a recording contract with Atlantic Records in 2003. After graduating from Petersburg High School in 2002, Songz moved to New Jersey to begin recording his debut album, though recording did not actually begin until 2003. While recording his debut album in 2004, Songz released multiple mixtapes under the alias Prince of Virginia. One of the mixtapes featured an "answer track" to R. Kelly's "Trapped in the Closet", entitled "Open the Closet". The song gave Songz some notoriety. When asked about the direction of his debut album, Songz said in 2005: "I had hip-hop instilled in me before R&B and then R. Kelly. I mixed rap into my singing so it flows R&B with hip-hop urgency. Its R&B but it feels like hip-hop. It's good R&B."

== Critical reception ==
Professional ratings
Review scores
Source	Rating
AllMusic	3.5/5 stars
Entertainment Weekly	A−
Gigwise	4/5 stars
HipHopDX	4.5/5 stars
Vibe	3.5/5 stars

Margeaux Watson from Entertainment Weekly described the album as "a sexy collection of eleven slow jams and thumping grooves that pay homage to Motown's golden era. The disc not only bridges the stylistic gap between Marvin Gaye and R. Kelly, it warmly introduces hip-hop soul's finest new voice." HipHopDX called the album "a unique blend of R&B soul and funk with a mix of Trey Songz' spicy creativity and originality; A combination of hot production, smooth flowing vocals, and strong lyrics makes this a tight album [...] I Gotta Make It is a CD that eschews a breath of fresh air."

Andy Kellman of AllMusic said found that "while Songz is hopefully shaking off his obvious indebtedness to [R.] Kelly here, I Gotta Make It is both very enjoyable and full of promise, carrying a fine balance between throwback and modern hip-hop soul. You can always sense that Songz is excited to be making an album; he doesn't even bother to affect a distant sense of cool, unlike so many of his youthful contemporaries, which is a definite asset." Vibe editor Letisha Marrero Songz's wrote that Songz' "11-track offering is cohesive but missing that mind-blowing club joint. Perhaps the understatement is by design, as it allows for particular attention to the singer's versatile writing." Will Lavin, writing for Gigwise, felt that Songz' vocal performance on I Gotta Make It "showcases the rise of an artist destined for big things."

== Chart performance ==
I Gotta Make It debuted and peaked at number 20 on US Billboard 200 chart in the week August 13, 2005, selling 40,000 copies. In September 2010, Billboard reported that the album had sold 396,000 units in the United States by then.

== Track listing ==
I Gotta Make It track listing
No.	Title	Writer(s)	Producer(s)	Length
1.	"A Message from Aretha"	Troy Taylor	Taylor; Trey Songz^{[a]}	0:31
2.	"Gotta Make It" (featuring Twista)	Tremaine Neverson; Carl Mitchell; Harold Lilly; Taylor; Kim Hoglund; Leon Huff	Kookie; Taylor; Songz^{[a]}	4:03
3.	"Cheat on You"	Neverson; Taylor; Delante "Butta" Murphy; Felton Pilate	Taylor; Songz^{[a]}	3:46
4.	"Gotta Go"	Neverson; Taylor; Marvin Smith	Taylor; Songz^{[a]}	4:07
5.	"Ooo"	Neverson; Taylor; Dana Hammond; Balewa Muhammad; Mischke Butler; Robert Waller; Sly Jordan; Warryn Campbell; Christopher "Deep" Henderson	Campbell; Hammond^{[b]}; Songz^{[a]}; Taylor^{[a]}	3:38
6.	"All the Ifs"	Neverson; Taylor; Waller; Jordan; Lewis	Scott Storch; Songz^{[a]}; Taylor^{[a]}	5:05
7.	"Ur Behind"	Neverson; Rion Jones; Murphy; Brandon Green	Bei Maejor; Songz; Taylor^{[a]}	3:19
8.	"From a Woman's Hand"	Neverson; Taylor; Lewis; Michael Ameen	Taylor; Michael Me^{[b]}; Songz^{[a]}	3:44
9.	"Kinda Lovin'"	Neverson; Taylor; Rick "Star" Williams	Taylor; Songz^{[a]}	3:39
10.	"Comin' for You"	Neverson; Taylor; Delante Murphy; Patrick Brown; Ray Murray; Rico Wade	Organized Noize; Songz^{[a]}; Taylor^{[a]}	3:55
11.	"Just Wanna Cut (Prelude)"	Taylor	Taylor; Songz^{[a]}	0:46
12.	"Just Wanna Cut"	Neverson; Taylor; Jasper Murray; Murphy; J.R. Rotem	J.R. Rotem; Songz^{[a]}; Taylor^{[a]}	3:57
13.	"In the Middle"	Neverson; Taylor; Greg "Buggyeye" Desilus; Steffon "SteffNasty" Reed; Shawn "St. Ranger" Harris; Lewis	The BeatBanggahz; Taylor; Songz^{[a]}	4:00
14.	"Make Love Tonight"	Neverson; Taylor	Taylor; Songz^{[a]}	4:16
15.	"Hatin' Love"	Neverson; Taylor; Lewis; Ameen	Taylor; Michael Me^{[b]}; Songz^{[a]}	3:3
16.	"Gotta Go (Reprise)"	Neverson; Taylor; Smith	Taylor; Songz^{[a]}	2:29
17.	"Gotta Make It (Remix)" (featuring Aretha Franklin and Juvenile)	Neverson; Taylor; Lilly; Hoglund; Huff; Terius Gray	Ron G; Songz^{[a]}	4:13

Bonus tracks
No.	Title	Writer(s)	Producer(s)	Length
18.	"Set of Wings"			3:23
19.	"Open the Closet"	Neverson; Taylor; Robert Kelly	Taylor; Songz^{[a]}	3:20

iTunes bonus tracks
No.	Title	Writer(s)	Producer(s)	Length
18.	"You Can Get It" (featuring T.I.)	Neverson; Clifford Harris; Joe Kent; Mark Williams; Ezekiel Lewis	Trackboyz; Songz^{[a]}	4:05

Notes

- ^{^[a]} signifies vocal producer(s)
- ^{^[b]} signifies co-producer(s)

Sample credits

- "Gotta Make It" contains elements from "It's Forever" performed by The Ebonys.
- "Cheat on You" contains elements from "(Let Me Put) Love on Your Mind" performed by Con Funk Shun.
- "Gotta Go" and "Gotta Go (Reprise)" contains elements from "Child" performed by 21st Century.

== Charts ==
=== Weekly charts ===
Weekly chart performance for I Gotta Make It
Chart (2005)	Peak position
US Billboard 200	20
US Top R&B/Hip-Hop Albums (Billboard)	6

=== Year-end charts ===
2005 year-end chart performance for I Gotta Make It
Chart (2005)	Position
US Top R&B/Hip-Hop Albums (Billboard)	91

2006 year-end chart performance for I Gotta Make It
Chart (2005)	Position
US Top R&B/Hip-Hop Albums (Billboard)	89

== Release history ==
Release dates and formats for I Gotta Make It
Region	Date	Format(s)	Label(s)	Ref.
United States	July 26, 2005	CD; digital download	Atlantic	
