= Gotta Make It =

Single by Trey Songz featuring Twista

from the album I Gotta Make It
- Released: March 2, 2005
- Recorded: 2004
- Genre: R&B
- Length: 4:03
- Label: Atlantic
- Songwriters: Tremaine Neverson; Carl Mitchell; Harold Lilly; Taylor; Kim Hoglund; Gamble & Huff
- Producer: Troy Taylor

Trey Songz singles chronology
"Gotta Make It" (2005)	"Gotta Go" (2005)

Twista singles chronology
"Hope" (2004)	"Gotta Make It" (2005)	"Girl Tonite" (2005)

"Gotta Make It" is the debut single by singer Trey Songz from his debut album I Gotta Make It. The song features rapper Twista and reached number 87 on the US Billboard Hot 100.

The song samples from "It's Forever" by The Ebonys.

The music video features a guest appearance by R&B singer Gerald Levert and was shot in Trey Songz's hometown of Petersburg, Virginia.

== Charts ==
=== Weekly charts ===
Chart (2005)	Peak position
Netherlands (Urban Top 100)	43
US Billboard Hot 100	87
US Hot R&B/Hip-Hop Songs (Billboard)	21

=== Year-end charts ===
Chart (2005)	Position
US Hot R&B/Hip-Hop Songs (Billboard)	83
