= The Day After (album) =

Studio album by Twista
- Released: October 4, 2005
- Length: 57:05
- Label: Atlantic
- Producers: Bigg D; Mr. Collipark; Bryan-Michael Cox; Cuxo; Darkchild; Jim Jonsin; R. Kelly; MAD; The Neptunes; Scott Storch; Toxic

Twista chronology
Kamikaze (2004)	The Day After (2005)	Adrenaline Rush 2007 (2007)

Singles from The Day After
- 1. "Girl Tonite" Released: September 20, 2005; 2. "Hit the Floor" Released: 2005; 3. "So Lonely" Released: January 18, 2006

The Day After is the fourth studio album by American rapper Twista. It was released on October 4, 2005 via Atlantic Records. The follow-up to his 2004 breakthrough album Kamikaze, the album marked Twista's first project without contribution from longtime collaborator The Legendary Traxster. Instead, he worked with a variety of new collaborators on the album, including Bigg D, Mr. Collipark, Cuxo, Bryan-Michael Cox, Rodney Jerkins, Jim Jonsin, R. Kelly, The Neptunes, Scott Storch, and Toxic.

The album received mixed to positive reviews from music critics some of which called it one of 2005's best hip hop albums, while others criticized The Day After for being too predictable. Upon release, it debuted and peaked at number two on the US Billboard 200 and became the rapper's second album to reach the top of the Top R&B/Hip-Hop Albums chart. The Day After was eventually certified Gold by the Recording Industry Association of America (RIAA). Lead single "Girl Tonite" peaked at number 14 on the US Billboard Hot 100 chart.

== Critical reception ==
Professional ratings
Aggregate scores
Source	Rating
Metacritic	69/100
Review scores
Source	Rating
AllMusic	3.5/5 stars
HipHopDX	4/5 stars
Los Angeles Times	3.5/5 stars
PopMatters	9/10
RapReviews	9/10
Rolling Stone	2/5 stars
Stylus Magazine	B+
USA Today	3/4 stars
Vibe	3.5/5 stars

Matt Cibula from PopMatters called the album the "finest mainstream hip-hop album of the year." He noted that aside from a "guest star supernova," The Day After was a "Twista album. He’s funny, he’s scary, he’s goth (but not as goth as last time), he’s sexy, he’s a whole lot of things." RapReviews critic Steve "Flash" Juon found that The Day After was "not a perfect album, but it's solid from start to finish and an excellent follow-up to Kamikaze." HipHopDX noted that "overall, Twista serenades us with a slew of the old and the new on this album. He shows versatility while remaining consistent. He exudes confidence while remaining humble. With a few other surprises that I didn’t mention and the ones I gave away, the album is well put together."

Steve Jones from USA Today called the project "another set of swaggering rapid-fire anthems and sex-you-up ballads." AllMusic editor David Jeffries remarked that The Day After was "heavy with R&B, slickness, and hooks" and offered "great singles, worthy filler, and a couple missteps." Kefela Sanneh, writing for The New York Times, found that "Twista's fast but heavy rhyme style doesn't often leave room for charm or narrative or wit. But his intricate verbal rhythms are more important than the words, anyway, and the album has a fistful of wild beats and well-chosen cameos." Billboard felt that The Day After failed at "eliciting the same response as its predecessor [but] luckily, there are enough highlights to balance things out." Rolling Stone magazine described the album as "predictable and unexceptional."

== Commercial performance ==
The Day After debuted and peaked at number two on US Billboard 200, selling 129,000 units in its first week of release. It became Twista's second album to reach the top of the Top R&B/Hip-Hop Albums chart. On December 9, 2005, The Day After was certified Gold by the Recording Industry Association of America (RIAA). By June 2006, the album had sold 495,000 units in the United States, according to Nielsen Soundscan.

== Track listing ==
The Day After track listing
No.	Title	Writer(s)	Producer(s)	Length
1.	"The Day After" (featuring Syleena Johnson)	Carl Mitchell; Frederick Taylor	Toxic	2:49
2.	"Check That Hoe"	Mitchell; Taylor	Toxic	3:30
3.	"Chocolate Fe's and Redbones" (featuring Johnny P)	Mitchell; Taylor	Toxic	3:54
4.	"Get It How You Live"	Mitchell; Scott Storch	Scott Storch	4:01
5.	"Lavish" (featuring Pharrell)	Mitchell; Pharrell Williams	The Neptunes	3:42
6.	"Girl Tonite" (featuring Trey Songz)	Mitchell; Richard Jones; Derrick Baker; James Scheffer; Melvin Riley Jr.; Gordon Strozier	Jim Jonsin; Bigg D	3:42
7.	"Do Wrong" (featuring Lil' Kim)	Mitchell; Taylor; Al Green; Mabon Hodges	Toxic	4:00
8.	"Heartbeat"	Mitchell; Taylor	Toxic	2:59
9.	"Holding Down the Game"	Mitchell; Michael Moore	Cuzo	4:24
10.	"When I Get You Home (A.I.O.U)" (featuring Jamie Foxx and Pharrell)	Mitchell; Williams	The Neptunes	4:15
11.	"So Lonely" (with Mariah Carey)	Mitchell; Mariah Carey; Rodney Jerkins; Adonis Shropshire; Makeba Riddick; LaShawn Daniels	Darkchild	3:51
12.	"Had to Call" (featuring Snoop Dogg and Sleepy Eyed Jones)	Mitchell; Calvin Broadus; R. Jones; William Simmons	MAD	3:47
13.	"Out Here" (featuring Juvenile and Speedknot Mobstaz)	Mitchell; Moore; Terius Gray; Jabari Bristow; Calvin Thomas	Cuzo	4:03
14.	"I'm a Winner"	Mitchell; Moore	Cuzo	4:20
15.	"Hit the Floor" (featuring Pitbull)	Mitchell; Michael Crooms; Armando Christian Pérez	Mr. Collipark	3:38

International edition bonus tracks
No.	Title	Producer(s)	Length
16.	"Hell No (Leave Home)" (featuring Monica)	Bryan-Michael Cox	4:45
17.	"Hit It Til the Mornin" (featuring R. Kelly and Do or Die)	R. Kelly	4:18

Sample credits

- "Girl Tonite" contains excerpts from "Tonight" as written by Ready for the World.
- "Do Wrong" contains samples from the composition "Love & Happiness" by Al Green.
- "Had to Call" contains samples from the composition "Love Is Alive" by Midnight Star.
- "I'm a Winner" contains samples from the composition "One Me" by R. Kelly.

== Charts ==
=== Weekly charts ===
Weekly chart performance for The Day After
Chart (2005)	Peak position
New Zealand Albums (RMNZ)	32
UK Albums (Official Charts)	100
US Billboard 200	2
US Top R&B/Hip-Hop Albums (Billboard)	1

=== Year-end charts ===
Year-end chart performance for The Day After
Chart (2005)	Position
US Top R&B/Hip-Hop Albums (Billboard)	72

== Certifications ==
Sales and certifications for The Day After
Region	Certification	Certified units/sales
United States (RIAA)	Gold	500,000^{^}
^{^} Shipments figures based on certification alone.
