= 2 Reasons =

Single by Trey Songz featuring T.I.

from the album Chapter V
- Released: June 12, 2012
- Recorded: 2011
- Genre: R&B; hip hop
- Length: 3:19
- Label: Atlantic
- Songwriters: Clifford Harris; Najja McDowell; Kyle Stewart; Tremaine Neverson; Troy Taylor; Menardini Timothee
- Producer: Troy Taylor

Trey Songz singles chronology
"Heart Attack" (2012)	"2 Reasons" (2012)	"Simply Amazing" (2012)

T.I. singles chronology
"Back 2 Life (Live It Up)" (2012)	"2 Reasons" (2012)	"Go Get It" (2012)

"2 Reasons" is a song by American R&B singer Trey Songz, featuring vocals from American rapper T.I. It was released in the United States on June 12, 2012. The song serves as the second single from his fifth studio album, Chapter V (2012). It was featured on the 2013 film Texas Chainsaw 3D, which is also starring Songz.

== Music video ==
The video was filmed in April 2012 in Atlanta, Georgia and directed by Benny Boom. The video was premiered on June 12, 2012, on BET's 106 & Park. This was the beginning of the Santiago Era for Trey Songz.

== Track listing ==
Digital download
No.	Title	Length
1.	"2 Reasons" (feat. T.I.)	3:19

== Chart performance ==
=== Weekly charts ===
Chart (2012)	Peak position
UK Hip Hop/R&B (Official Charts)	40
US Billboard Hot 100	43
US Hot R&B/Hip-Hop Songs (Billboard)	7
US Rhythmic Airplay (Billboard)	1
US Pop Airplay (Billboard)	32

=== Year-end charts ===
Chart (2012)	Position
US Hot R&B/Hip-Hop Songs (Billboard)	53
US Rhythmic (Billboard)	17

== Certifications ==
Region	Certification	Certified units/sales
United States (RIAA)	Platinum	1,000,000^{‡}
^{‡} Sales+streaming figures based on certification alone.

== Release history ==
Region	Date	Format	Label
United States	June 12, 2012	Digital download	Atlantic Records
United States	June 19, 2012	Urban radio	Atlantic Records
Germany	July 20, 2012	Digital download	Atlantic Records
Austria	July 20, 2012	Digital download	Atlantic Records
Switzerland	July 20, 2012	Digital download	Atlantic Records
New Zealand	July 20, 2012	Digital download	Atlantic Records
Australia	July 20, 2012	Digital download	

== See also ==
- List of Billboard Rhythmic number-one songs of the 2010s
