= Girl Tonite =

Single by Twista featuring Trey Songz

from the album The Day After
- Released: September 20, 2005
- Recorded: 2005
- Genre: Hip hop; R&B
- Length: 3:46
- Label: Atlantic
- Songwriters: Carl Mitchell; Richard Jones; Derrick Baker; James Scheffer; Melvin Riley Jr.; Gordon Strozier
- Producers: Jim Jonsin; Bigg D

Twista singles chronology
"Gotta Make It" (2005)	"Girl Tonite" (2005)	"Hit the Floor" (2005)

Trey Songz singles chronology
"Gotta Go" (2005)	"Girl Tonite" (2005)	"Summer wit Miami" (2005)

"Girl Tonite" is the first single from Twista's Atlantic album, The Day After. It features R&B singer Trey Songz. "Girl Tonite" peaked at number 14 on the Billboard Hot 100 and was certified gold by the RIAA on June 14, 2006. The song samples "Tonight" by Ready for the World.

== Charts ==
=== Weekly charts ===
Chart (2005)	Peak position
UK Singles (Official Charts)	47
US Billboard Hot 100	14
US Hot R&B/Hip-Hop Songs (Billboard)	3
US Hot Rap Songs (Billboard)	2
US Rhythmic Airplay (Billboard)	12

=== Year-end charts ===
Chart (2005)	Position
US Hot R&B/Hip-Hop Songs (Billboard)	47
Chart (2006)	Position
US Hot R&B/Hip-Hop Songs (Billboard)	70

== Certifications ==
Region	Certification	Certified units/sales
United States (RIAA) Mastertone	Gold	500,000^{^}
^{^} Shipments figures based on certification alone.

== Release history ==
Release dates and formats for "Girl Tonite"
Region	Date	Format	Label(s)	Ref.
United States	October 25, 2005	Mainstream airplay	Atlantic	
