= Pru (album) =

Studio album by Pru
- Released: November 7, 2000
- Genres: R&B; neo soul
- Length: 58:00
- Label: Capitol
- Producers: Pru; Ben Garrison; Rick Williams

Singles from Pru
- 1. "Candles" Released: September 4, 2000; 2. "Aaroma (of a Man)" Released: June 2001

Pru is the debut studio album by American singer Pru. It was released on November 7, 2000, through Capitol Records. Pru was managed by Capitol Records executive Roy Lott, who had signed Pru to Warner/Chappell Music Publishing after being impressed by her songwriting and voice on a demo tape. Pru collaborated with Ben Garrison, the Characters, and Rick Williams on the album.

According to Lott, Pru was part of Capitol Records's attempts to attract a wider audience through her crossover appeal. According to music critics, the album encompasses several genres, with some commentators noting influences from neo soul. Pru also used poetry as an inspiration for writing music.

Reviews of the album were generally positive, singling out in particular its composition and Pru's voice. They also compared her favorably to contemporary artists. The album peaked at number 176 on the US Billboard 200 chart, an achievement made possible in part by an intensive marketing strategy devised by Capitol Records executives. Two singles – "Candles" and "Aaroma (of a Man)" [sic] – were released to positive reviews. "Candles" peaked at number 68 on the US Hot R&B/Hip-Hop Songs chart.

== Background and recording ==
American singer Prudencesa Renfro, professionally known as Pru, was signed through Warner/Chappell Music Publishing by Capitol Records's executive Roy Lott, who said that he was "drawn to" her songwriting and voice. Jack Ponti, of Cazzy Dog Management, had helped Pru produce a demo tape to secure the record deal. Lott had noted Pru's potential as an artist through her lyrics. He worked closely with her to match her songwriting to the most appropriate sound, serving as the executive producer for her debut studio album Pru.

Prior to securing a record deal, Pru had found inspiration for her music in artists such as Cassandra Wilson and Dianne Reeves. She wrote song lyrics and poetry while attending high school and then Texas Southern University, coupling her lyrics with the music of other artists such as Michael Jackson, Rachelle Ferrell, Sade, Naughty by Nature, the Isley Brothers, and Miles Davis. While discussing her approach to songwriting, Pru elaborated: "From a word, I can get a whole picture, a visual. The song becomes a poem, almost like a thesis." She considered her music as a form of poetry, citing the album track "Hazy Shades" as an example of a poem turned into a song.

Pru stated that she wanted her songs to bring variety to contemporary R&B, and described the material as the opposite of the formulaic music typically found on radio. On her official website, the singer identified her style as connected with the soul. Though AllMusic gives the singer songwriting credit on twelve of the tracks, Pru is only credited as a co-writer for "Aaroma" on the album's liner notes. The record was completed at Studio 57 and Weight Room in New York City, with mixing handled by Mike Shipley and Tony Maserati. Following the release of the album, Pru spoke highly of her experiences with the producers and felt that they "la[id] a good bed around the lyrics and the melodies".

== Composition ==
"Smooth Operator"
A sample of Pru's cover of Sade's "Smooth Operator". The track was noted for its influences from Latin music, primarily in its use of percussion and flutes.

Pru comprises thirteen songs, among which music critics identified several different musical genres. Tucson Weekly's Margaret Regan wrote that Pru's material was an example of new age music, while Janine Coveney of Billboard called the singer's sound as "alterna-soul/pop music". AllMusic's Ed Hogan noted that the songs combined hip hop, Latin music, contemporary R&B, rock, and trip hop.

Pru called the opening track, "Prophecy of a Flower", the album's focal point, saying that "everything else falls a little to the left and to the right of that". The R&B and soul song's lyrics incorporate words from the he loves me... he loves me not game. The second track, "183 Miles", combines hip hop and country music, its lyrics revolving around a love story. Sampling the Miracles' 1965 song "The Tracks of My Tears", "Candles" is a "midtempo groove" that features the titular object, candles, as a metaphor for "stress (burned at both ends) and healing (lit for meditation)". The Miracles' single was a direct inspiration for the lyrics and instrumentation on the track. Hogan, however, saw "Candles" as diverging from the song's message.

Coveney described "Aaroma", the fourth track, as offering a "sexy challenge" to the listener. Pru adapted one of the song's lyrics, "If a man came my way and I didn't doubt him", from one of her poems. While discussing the meaning of the title, the singer said it derived from an "old southern saying: 'I could smell you coming'". "Hazy Shade" is a ballad that Hogan described as "recall[ing] 'blue light in the basement' old skool slow jams". Preceded by "Salsa Interlude", Pru's cover of Sade's 1984 single "Smooth Operator" features a stronger Latin-inspired instrumental than the original. Hogan noted that the song included "popping percussion and fluttery flute runs". The ending of the ninth track, "Can't Compare Your Love", takes inspiration from spoken word performances, and the following song ,"Sketches of Pain", deliberately plays with the title of Miles Davis' 1960 album Sketches of Spain. Colin Ross of PopMatters described the twelfth track, "What They Gone Do?", as featuring a "brassy two-step" in its instrumentation.

== Release and promotion ==
On August 19, 2000, Pru was first announced as an untitled album scheduled for release the following month. Pushed back to October 24, 2000, the album was developed under the working title Inside A Poem – a reference to Pru's poetic style of songwriting. Retitled Pru, Capitol Records released the record on November 7, 2000, as an audio CD, cassette, and digital download. It was also made available as an "enhanced audio CD", which contains multimedia computer files and a video entitled "In the Life of Pru". Pru reached a peak position of number 176 on the Billboard 200, spending two weeks on the chart, and peaked on Billboard's R&B Albums at number 38, leaving the chart after thirty-two weeks.

Prior to the album's release, Pru performed with a band that included members of the Family Stand at the Los Angeles venue Luna Park and the New York City club S.O.B. She sang later in Chicago, Houston, and Atlanta to promote the album further. Pru also toured with the Family Stand and members of Sade. While discussing the album's promotion, Linton said: "Pru is a live performance artist and, being new, we wanted people to get their first impression of her in that environment".

According to Billboard magazine, Capitol Records had placed significant focus on the marketing for the album, including the release of an electronic press kit and promotion through "non-retail accounts". Lott told Billboard magazine that Pru would act as a primary part of Capitol Records' attempt to attract a wider audience with her crossover appeal. David Linton, Capitol Records' senior vice president of R&B promotion and marketing, identified R&B, adult contemporary music, and top 40 music as potential markets for the singer.

=== Singles ===
Released as the lead single from Pru, "Candles" was sent to rhythmic radio stations in the United States during the first week of September. Lott said the song was chosen as Pru's debut single as he felt that its allusions to the Miracles' song would appeal to listeners of all ages. It was further promoted by its inclusion on a back-to-school CD sampler from retailer Delia's. Director Dave Meyers shot the accompanying music video, which was released on November 25, 2000. The video premiered on MTV in February 2001, following roughly two months of rotation on BET. "Candles" reached number 68 on the Hot R&B/Hip-Hop Songs Billboard chart where it spent fourteen weeks, and peaked at number 65 on the R&B/Hip-Hop Airplay Billboard chart where it spent ten weeks. For both chart appearances, Billboard credited the song as appearing on The Sound of Style: Capitol Records Fall 2000 Collection. Critical response to "Candles" was positive. David Dickinson, a music director at WHUR-FM, felt the single would be appropriate for radio and praised its production and Pru's voice. A writer from Billboard magazine complimented the lyrics and Pru's vocal performance, contrasting the artist's "cool, literate sensibility [against] the blatant sexual overtones" from other contemporary R&B female singers, but expressed doubt that hip-hop and mainstream R&B stations would play the song, seeing it as better suited for adult R&B radio.

"Aaroma" was released as the album's second single under the modified title "Aaroma (of a Man)". A writer from Billboard magazine compared its lyrics positively to those in Toni Braxton's "Un-Break My Heart" (1996). Another reviewer from the same publication singled out the track as one of the best from the album. According to a Billboard article published on June 16, 2001, dance and R&B remixes of the song were commissioned from Hani al-Badir and Carlos "Six July" Broady, respectively; the remixes were scheduled to be added to a re-release of the album. A music video for the single was filmed in June 2001. The song was also featured on the EMI-released album Celebrating Black Music Sampler 2001. Along with the two singles "Candles" and "Aaroma (of a Man)", the record was promoted as featuring "Smooth Operator" and "183 Miles".

== Critical reception ==
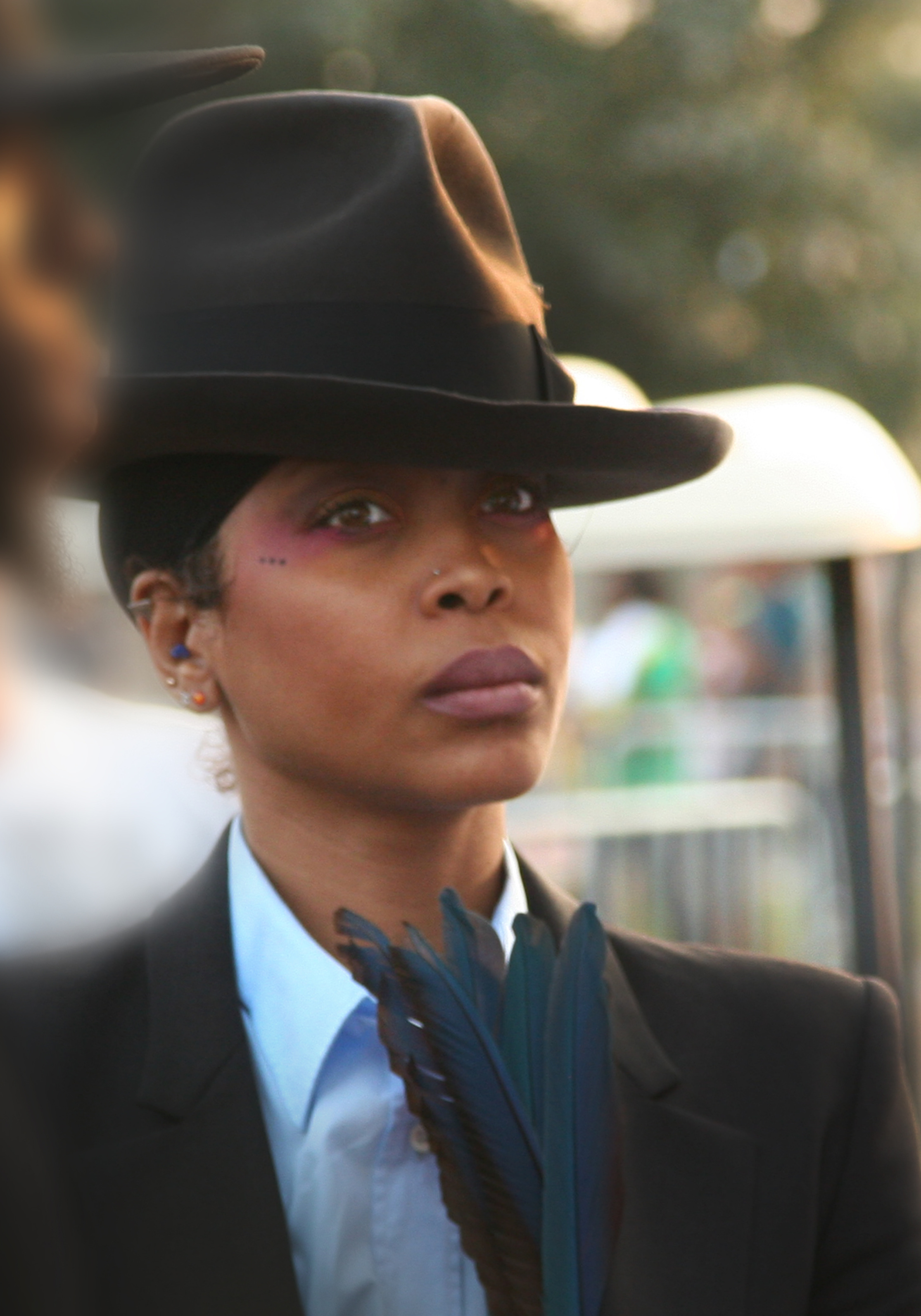
Pru was frequently compared to neo soul artists such as Erykah Badu (pictured).

Upon its release, Pru received positive feedback from music critics. Ed Hogan praised Pru's experimentation with musical genres. In discussing its many influences, Colin Ross wrote that the album never sounded uneven or disjointed. He commended the singer for communicating a range of emotions, by turns seeming "innocent, self-assured, uncertain, elated and vulnerable", praising in particular the album's instrumentation and lyrics. A Billboard writer described Pru as "sparkl[ing] with colorfully imaged songs about love won, lost and anticipated". USA Today's Steve Jones praised the performer for the "remarkable depth in her poetics about joy and heartbreak". Jones wrote that the album demonstrated that Pru had a clear sense of what she wanted to achieve for her career and sound. Ebony's Lynn Norment described her as possessing a "rich, earthy voice and lyrical talent", responding positively to the artist's influences from scripture and poetry. A writer for Sister 2 Sister commended Pru for her ability to convey emotion to the listener, and identified "Prophecy of a Flower" as their favorite track from the album. The Houston Press' Craig D. Lindsey praised Pru's music and live performances, describing her songs as "soulful, earthy and organic" and the antithesis to music such as Destiny's Child's 1999 single "Bills, Bills, Bills". The album was called "[a]rtful ... stunning ... sexy" by a reviewer from People.

Several media outlets compared Pru to other artists, with a Billboard reviewer attributing the singer as writing in the same style as contemporary neo soul performers. The singer's voice was compared to Lauryn Hill, Macy Gray, and Erykah Badu by AllMusic's Stacia Proefrock. She was classified as part of an "emerging school of poetics" by Ross, who said that she was "subtly changing the landscape of contemporary R&B lyricism". A Billboard reviewer also placed the singer as a member of "the new soul movement", and compared her work to that of Angie Stone, Amel Larrieux, Jill Scott, and Badu. A writer from the journal Today's Black Woman saw Pru as part of the neo soul genre along with Badu and Scott, saying that these singers incorporated in their music "traditional R&B as well as its new millennium, hip-hop inspired modern counterpart". Pru responded positively to the comparisons, saying: "What I think is being classified as the neo-soul classic movement has artists that are individually different in their own right, but aren't different from modern R&B."

== Track listing ==
All tracks are produced by Ben Garrison, the Characters, Pru, and Rick Williams.

Pru track listing
No.	Title	Writer(s)	Length
1.	"Prophecy of a Flower"	Ben Garrison; Rick Williams	4:31
2.	"183 Miles"	Williams	5:18
3.	"Candles"	Charles Farrar; Troy Taylor	4:26
4.	"Aaroma"	Garrison; Andrew Hale; Stuart Matthewman; Prudensca Renfro; Williams	4:20
5.	"Hazy Shades"	Williams	4:55
6.	"Salsa Interlude"	Mark Fineberg; Williams	0:41
7.	"Smooth Operator"	Sade Adu; Ray St. John	4:41
8.	"Got Me High"	Farrar; Taylor	3:51
9.	"Can't Compare Your Love"	Taylor; Williams	5:49
10.	"Sketches of Pain"	Taylor	4:28
11.	"Reason Why"	Camus Mare Celli	4:29
12.	"What They Gone Do?"	Williams	5:13
13.	"Until the End"	Williams	5:14
Total length:			58:00

== Personnel ==
Credits were adapted from the liner notes and AllMusic.

- Kwaku Alston – photography
- Marc Anthony – guitar
- Linda Cobb – art direction, design
- Leah Coloff – cello
- Jeff Crews – assistant engineer, engineer
- Loren Dawson – violin
- Daphaney Epps – backing vocals
- Mark Fineberg – flute, horn
- Ben Garrison – African percussion, arranger, drum programming, engineer, producer, vocal percussion
- Ben "Hollowell" Garrison – engineer
- Genvieve – make-up
- Lisa Gutkin – violin
- Roy "Royalty" Hamilton – keyboards
- Chaz Harper – engineer
- Lamenga Kafi – backing vocals
- David Laurence – viola
- Roy Lott – executive producer
- Tony Maserati – mixing
- Ozzie Melendez – horn
- Mika Mukawa – assistant engineer, engineer
- Jack Ponti – direction, management
- Nikki Ponti – production coordination
- Pru – arranger, primary artist, producer, vocals
- Hernán Santiago – assistant engineer, engineer
- Todd Schwartz – horn
- Mike Shipley – mixing
- Maggie Sikkens – A&R
- Troy Taylor – Fender rhodes, organ, piano, synthesizer, backing vocals, Wurlitzer
- Rick Williams – arranger, bass, guitar, producer, songwriter, vocal percussion
- Basia Zamorska – stylist

== Charts ==
Chart performance
Chart (2001)	Peak position
US Billboard 200	176
US Top R&B/Hip-Hop Albums (Billboard)	38

== Release history ==
Release dates and formats
Region	Date	Format	Label	Ref.
United States	November 7, 2000	Cassette; CD; digital download	Capitol	
