= Every Year, Every Christmas =

Single by Luther Vandross

from the album This Is Christmas
- Released: 1995
- Length: 5:06 (single edit)
- Label: LV; Epic
- Songwriters: Luther Vandross; Richard Marx
- Producer: Luther Vandross

Luther Vandross singles chronology
"Ain't No Stoppin' Us Now" (1995)	"Every Year, Every Christmas" (1995)	"Your Secret Love" (1996)

"Every Year, Every Christmas" is a song by American singer-songwriter Luther Vandross, released by LV and Epic Records in December 1995. It was written by Vandross and Richard Marx for his tenth studio album, the holiday album This Is Christmas (1995), while production was helmed by Vandross. The original Christmas song received moderate rotation on radio and peaked at number 32 on the US Billboard R&B/Hip-Hop Airplay chart. Singer Patti LaBelle also covered the song, which appeared on her 2007 Christmas album Miss Patti's Christmas. The LaBelle version was spoken at the end, with the song dedicated to Vandross.

== Critical reception ==
Jordan Paramor from Smash Hits gave "Every Year, Every Christmas" four out of five, writing, "Government health warning: Do not listen to this single if you're going to be boyfriend/girlfriend-less this Christmas, 'cos when we tried a little experiment on one of the members of the office (ie sat her down and forced her to listen to Luther's mellow tinkerings and outrageously romantic shenigans about being in love at Christmas), she ran around the office wailing and trying to snog the face off any bloke that'd look her way. Not a pleasant sight, but a very charming tune nonetheless!"

== Music video ==
The music video for "Every Year, Every Christmas", shot in black-and-white, was directed by German film maker Marcus Nispel.

== Track listings ==
CD single
No.	Title	Writer(s)	Producer(s)	Length
1.	"Every Year, Every Christmas"	Luther Vandross; Richard Marx	Vandross	5:06
2.	"My Favourite Things"	Rodgers & Hammerstein	Nat Adderley Jr.	5:58
3.	"Evergreen"	Barbra Streisand; Paul Williams	Walter Afanasieff	3:54
4.	"The Impossible Dream"	Joe Darion; Mitch Leigh	Afanasieff	5:16

== Charts ==
Weekly chart performance for "Every Year, Every Christmas"
Chart (1995)	Peak position
UK Singles (OCC)	43
US Adult R&B Songs (Billboard)	24
US R&B/Hip-Hop Airplay (Billboard)	32

2025 weekly chart performance for "Every Year, Every Christmas"
Chart (2025)	Peak position
Jamaica Airplay (JAMMS)	6
