= Dive In (Trey Songz song) =

Promotional single by Trey Songz

from the album Chapter V
- Released: August 14, 2012
- Genre: R&B
- Length: 4:12
- Label: Atlantic
- Songwriters: Josh Garrison; Najja McDowell; Tremaine Neverson
- Producers: Josh Garrison; Troy Taylor

"Dive In" is a song by American R&B singer Trey Songz from his fifth studio album Chapter V. It was released on August 14, 2012 by Atlantic Records. The song peaked at number 77 on the Billboard Hot 100 and at number 5 on the Hot R&B/Hip-Hop Songs chart.

== Music video ==
The music video was filmed in Malibu, California in early July 2012 by director Justin Francis and was released on October 7, 2012.

== Charts ==
=== Weekly charts ===
Chart (2012)	Peak position
US Billboard Hot 100	77
US Hot R&B/Hip-Hop Songs (Billboard)	5

=== Year-end charts ===
Chart (2012)	Position
US Hot R&B/Hip-Hop Songs (Billboard)	44

== Certifications ==
Region	Certification	Certified units/sales
United States (RIAA)	Gold	500,000^{‡}
^{‡} Sales+streaming figures based on certification alone.
