= Chapter V (Trey Songz album) =

Studio album by Trey Songz
- Released: August 21, 2012
- Recorded: 2010–2012
- Genres: R&B; pop
- Length: 65:31
- Labels: Songbook; Atlantic
- Producers: Trey Songz (exec.); Rico Love; Troy Taylor (also exec.); J-Kits; Benny Blanco; Eric Hudson; John "SK" McGee; E. Miles; A-Wall; Darhyl Camper; Josh Garrison; C4; Ty$

Trey Songz chronology
Inevitable (2011)	Chapter V (2012)	Trigga (2014)

Singles from Chapter V
- 1. "Heart Attack" Released: March 26, 2012; 2. "2 Reasons" Released: June 12, 2012; 3. "Simply Amazing" Released: August 12, 2012; 4. "Never Again" Released: November 23, 2012

Chapter V is the fifth studio album by American R&B recording artist Trey Songz. It was released on August 21, 2012, by Songbook Entertainment and Atlantic Records. It was produced by several record producers, including Troy Taylor, Eric Hudson, Rico Love, and Benny Blanco, among others. Recording sessions for the album took place at several recording studios in Miami—Circle House Studios and Songbook Miami Studios—and New York City—Downtown Music Studios, Engine Room Audio, Icon Studio, Lotzah Matzah Studios, and Premier Digital—as well as Stanley House Studios in London.

The album debuted at number 1 on the US Billboard 200, selling 135,000 copies in its first week. It was promoted with four singles, including the Grammy nominated hit "Heart Attack" UK hit "Simply Amazing" and US hit 2 Reasons. Upon its release, Chapter V received generally positive reviews from music critics, who complimented its sound and Songz' singing, although some were ambivalent towards its songwriting and themes.

== Release and promotion ==
Chapter V was released on August 21, 2012, by Atlantic Records, and on August 17 as a digital download. Trey Songz toured in promotion of the album on his Anticipation 2our, a tour spanning from February 9 to March 11, 2012, in North America. Rapper Big Sean was the tour's supporting act. Music videos for "Hail Mary" and "Dive In", directed by Justin Francis, were released, on August 20 and October 7, respectively. He also toured in 2012 on the Chapter V World Tour.

The album's lead single, "Heart Attack", was released as a digital download on March 26, 2012. It charted at number 35 on the Billboard Hot 100, and number 28 on the UK Singles Chart. Its music video was released on May 4 and featured Kelly Rowland playing Songz' love interest. The second single "2 Reasons" was released on June 12. Its video was premiered on June 12 by BET's 106 & Park. "Simply Amazing" was released in the United Kingdom on August 12. It charted at number eight in the UK. Its music video, directed by Justin Francis, was released on July 23. "Never Again" was released as a single in the UK in November. Its music video was released on November 21.

== Critical reception ==
Professional ratings
Aggregate scores
Source	Rating
Metacritic	68/100
Review scores
Source	Rating
About.com	3.5/5 stars
AllMusic	3.5/5 stars
The Guardian	3/5 stars
Los Angeles Times	2.5/4 stars
Newsday	B−
Rolling Stone	3/5 stars

Chapter V received generally positive reviews from contemporary music critics. At Metacritic, which assigns a normalized rating out of 100 to reviews from mainstream critics, the album received an average score of 68, based on eight reviews. Allmusic's Andy Kellman commended Songz for "singing about what [he] can do for — rather than to" his female subjects and stated, "Those who tire of the coarse metaphors, disrobing scenes, and 'panty wetter' talk can get lost in the sleek, layered work of Troy Taylor and his associates. The snaking rhythms are just as remarkable as the hypnotic synthesizer textures." Sarah Godfrey of The Washington Post complimented Songz' "signature blend of soft-core imagery and sweet nothings" and wrote that the album "highlights Songz’s unique role in R&B: He bridges the gap between sexless boy bands and unromantic raunchy singers, between young guys who sing shallow songs about strip clubs and old guys who sing heavy songs about their divorces." Jon Caramanica of The New York Times dubbed it "one of his most consistently strong albums" in spite of the potential "conundrum" of drawing on R. Kelly and Usher as influences.

In a mixed review, Mikael Wood of the Los Angeles Times was ambivalent towards its boudior-themed songs and felt that Songz "might be R&B's most single-minded star". Jody Rosen of Rolling Stone found it to be "full of big ballads and bigger club beats that take dead aim at the pop mainstream", but added that "Songz is at his best playing to his R&B base". BBC Music's Natalie Shaw viewed that Songz does not "reveal a deeper side to his songwriting" until track nine. Ken Capobianco of The Boston Globe felt that it "could use editing", but wrote that "throughout this he sings with urgency and expressiveness." Although he viewed that Songz lacks "natural charisma", Alex Macpherson of The Guardian commended Troy Taylor for making the album "admirably cohesive" and Songz for "mov[ing] into traditional R Kelly territory", writing that it "helps to reinforce Songz's status as the formidable understudy of R&B."

== Commercial performance ==
The album debuted at number one on the US Billboard 200 chart, with first week sales of 135,000 copies. It was Songz' first album to top the chart. Chapter V was also Songz' first album to chart in the United Kingdom, where it peaked at number 10 on the UK Albums Chart. As of October 3, 2012, the album has sold 238,400 copies in the United States, according to Nielsen SoundScan. In August 2016, the album was certified gold by the Recording Industry Association of America (RIAA) for combined sales and streaming equivalent units of over 500,000 units.

== Track listing ==
Standard edition
No.	Title	Writer(s)	Producer(s)	Length
1.	"Chapter V"	Tremaine Neverson; Troy Taylor; Najja McDowell; Ezekiel Lewis; Edrick Miles	Taylor; Miles	1:54
2.	"Dive In"	Neverson; Taylor; McDowell; Josh Garrison	Taylor; Garrison	4:12
3.	"Panty Wetter"	Neverson; Taylor; Eric Hudson	Taylor; Hudson	3:50
4.	"Heart Attack"	Neverson; Benjamin Levin; Richard Butler, Jr.	Benny Blanco; Rico Love^{[a]}	3:53
5.	"Playin Hard"	Neverson; Taylor; McDowell; Lewis; Jerren Spruill	Taylor; J-Kits	3:54
6.	"2 Reasons" (featuring T.I.)	Neverson; Taylor; McDowell; Clifford Harris, Jr.; Kyle Stewart; Menardini Timothee	Taylor	3:17
7.	"Hail Mary" (featuring Young Jeezy and Lil Wayne)	Neverson; Taylor; Lewis; Dwayne Carter, Jr.; Jay Jenkins; Adam Crask	Taylor; Skyy Stylez	3:55
8.	"Don't Be Scared" (featuring Rick Ross)	Neverson; Taylor; William Roberts II; Alex Neverson	Taylor; A-Wall	3:46
9.	"Pretty Girl's Lie"	Neverson; Taylor; McDowell; Lewis; Spruill; Darhyl Camper	Taylor; J-Kits; Hey DJ	3:47
10.	"Bad Decisions"	Neverson; Butler; Dwayne Nesmith	Rico Love; D-Town	4:33
11.	"Forever Yours"	Neverson; Taylor; McDowell; Lewis; Miles	Taylor; Miles	4:14
12.	"Inside Interlewd"	Neverson; Taylor; John McGee	$K; J-Kits^{[b]}	1:41
13.	"Fumble"	Neverson; Darius Barnes; Janice Fyffe; Chuck Gibson; Alagy Sanneh; Nate Welch	Buddah Shampoo; Phonix Beats; Taylor^{[b]}; Ty$^{[b]}	3:57
14.	"Without a Woman"	Neverson; Taylor; McDowell; Lewis; Hudson; Sean Fenton	Taylor; Hudson	4:04
15.	"Interlude4U"	Neverson; Taylor; Spruill	Taylor; J-Kits	1:37
16.	"Simply Amazing"	Neverson; Taylor; McDowell	Taylor	3:59
17.	"Never Again"	Neverson; Teemu Brunila; James Abrahart; Curtis Mayfield; Matt Prime	Prime	3:49
18.	"Check Me Out" (featuring Diddy and Meek Mill)	Neverson; Taylor; Spruill; Brandon Green; Robert Williams	Taylor; J-Kits	4:59 (physical version) 3:34 (digital version)

Physical Copies Hidden Track
No.	Title	Writer(s)	{{{extra_column}}}	Length
19.	"Chapter V (Outro)"	Neverson; Taylor; McDowell; Lewis; Miles	Taylor	5:31
Total length:				70:52

iTunes deluxe edition
No.	Title	Writer(s)	Producer(s)	Length
19.	"Ladies Go Wild"	Neverson	Neverson	3:42
20.	"Almost Lose It"	Neverson; Umana	C4	4:19
21.	"Heart Attack" (music video)		Benny Boom	4:14
22.	"2 Reasons" (featuring T.I.) (music video)		Benny Boom	3:22

Notes

- ^{^[a]} – co-production
- ^{^[b]} – additional production

== Personnel ==
Credits for Chapter V adapted from Allmusic.

- Diego Avendaño – assistant
- Darius Barnes – producer
- Edgar Bautista – assistant
- Nick Bilardello – art direction, design
- Benny Blanco – engineer, instrumentation, producer, programming
- Jo Jo Brim – management
- Darhyl Camper – producer
- Angelo Caputo – assistant engineer
- Joseph Caravalho – assistant
- Mike Caren – A&R
- Chris Celestine – general manager
- Cameron Chambers – guitar
- Mark B. Christensen – mastering
- Talia Coles – stylist
- Philip Cook – programming
- Anthony Daniel – engineer
- Diddy – featured artist
- Jimmy Fontaine – photography
- Lanre Gaba – A&R
- Josh Garrison – producer
- Serban Ghenea – mixing
- Chuck Gibson – guitar
- John Hanes – engineer
- Dionne Harper – marketing
- Trehy Harris – assistant
- Benoit Holliger – assistant
- Jean-Marie Horvat – mixing
- Matt Huber – assistant
- Eric Hudson – producer
- Billy J – executive producer, A&R
- Jaycen Joshua – mixing
- Lil Wayne – featured artist
- Kevin Liles – management
- Rico Love – background vocals, producer, vocals
- Andrew Luftman – assistant
- Robert Marks – mixing
- Thurston McCrea – engineer
- John McGee – producer
- Pierre Medor – engineer
- Meek Mill – featured artist
- Edrick Miles – producer
- Dwayne Nesmith – keyboards, producer, programming
- Alex Neverson – producer
- Phillip Peterson – strings
- Matt Prime – guitar, keyboards, producer, programming
- Tony Rey – vocal engineer
- Rick Ross – featured artist
- Alagy Sanneh – producer
- Phil Seaford – assistant
- Sevyn – vocals
- Jerren "J-Kits" Spruill – additional production, producer
- Zach Steele – engineer
- Skyy Stylez – producer
- T.I. – featured artist
- Troy Taylor – additional production, bass, executive producer, keyboards, percussion, piano, producer
- Sean Thompson – assistant
- Carolyn Tracey – package production
- Trey Songz – executive producer, primary artist, vocals
- Ty$ – additional production, guitar
- Christopher Umana – producer
- Scott "Yarmov" Yarmovsky – production coordination
- Young Jeezy – featured artist

== Charts ==
=== Weekly charts ===
Chart (2012)	Peak position
Australian Albums Chart	18
Australian Urban Albums Chart	3
Belgian Albums Chart (Flanders)	156
Belgian Albums Chart (Wallonia)	100
Canadian Albums Chart	13
Dutch Albums Chart	6
French Albums Chart	64
New Zealand Albums Chart	36
UK Albums Chart	10
UK R&B Albums Chart	1
US Billboard 200	1
US Top R&B/Hip-Hop Albums	1

=== Year-end charts ===
Chart (2012)	Position
US Billboard 200	99
US Top R&B/Hip-Hop Albums	20
Chart (2013)	Position
US Top R&B/Hip-Hop Albums	55

== Certifications ==
Region	Certification	Certified units/sales
United States (RIAA)	Gold	500,000^{^}
^{^} Shipments figures based on certification alone.

== Release history ==
Regions	Dates	Format(s)	Label(s)
United States	August 17, 2012	Digital download	Atlantic Records
United States	August 21, 2012	CD	Atlantic Records
