= I Can Make It Better =

Single by Luther Vandross

from the album Your Secret Love
- Released: November 26, 1996 (U.S., Europe)
- Genre: R&B, soul
- Length: 4:29
- Label: Epic Records
- Songwriters: L. Vandross, M. Miller
- Producers: Luther Vandross, Marcus Miller

Luther Vandross singles chronology
"Your Secret Love" (1996)	"I Can Make It Better" (1996)	"Nights in Harlem" (1998)

Music video
- "I Can Make It Better" on YouTube

"I Can Make It Better" is a song by American recording artist Luther Vandross. It was released in 1996 as the second single from his tenth and platinum album, Your Secret Love (1996). The song reached number 15 on the US Billboard Hot R&B Singles chart and peaked in the top fifty on the UK Singles Chart. A music video was also produced to promote the single.

== Critical reception ==
Larry Flick from Billboard magazine declared the song as "an old-school soul ballad that reminds everyone why he is a truly untouchable stylist." He added, "In lesser hands, this song would reek of unprogrammable nostalgia. But Vandross cruises through the song with enticing and romantic flair, deftly swerving around an arrangement of strings and horns. A fine way to maintain the interest of R&B radio program- mers while possibly tweaking popsters who could certainly use a little more pure soul in their lives." A reviewer from Music Week gave the song a score of three out of five, describing it as "a smooth ballad with uptempo touches from the king of lurve".

== Track list ==
- US, UK CD single
1. "I Can Make It Better" (Single Edit) - 4:29
2. "I Can Make It Better" (Charles Roane Remix Edit) - 4:28
3. "I Can Make It Better" (Soulshock & Karlin Remix Edit) - 4:28
4. "A Kiss For Christmas" - 4:12

Note: "A Kiss for Christmas" is from the Vandross album This Is Christmas (1995)

== Charts ==
Chart (1996)	Peak position
Scotland (OCC)	85
UK Singles (OCC)	44
US Billboard Hot 100	80
US Adult R&B Songs (Billboard)	1
US Hot R&B/Hip-Hop Songs (Billboard)	15
