= This Is Christmas (Luther Vandross album) =

1995 studio album by Luther Vandross

Studio album by Luther Vandross
- Released: October 18, 1995
- Recorded: October 1994–July 1995
- Studio: Camel Island Studios (Los Angeles); Clinton Recording Studios; The Hit Factory; Power Station; Sterling Sound (New York City)
- Length: 48:21
- Label: LV; Epic
- Producer: Luther Vandross; Nat Adderley Jr.; Marcus Miller

Luther Vandross chronology
Songs (1994)	This Is Christmas (1995)	Your Secret Love (1996)

Singles from This Is Christmas
- 1. "Every Year, Every Christmas" Released: 1995

This Is Christmas is the tenth studio album by American singer Luther Vandross. It was released on October 18, 1995, by LV Records and Epic Records. The follow-up to Songs (1994), it marked the singer's first Christmas album. Produced by Vandross along with Nat Adderley Jr. and Marcus Miller, This Is Christmas consists of ten tracks, featuring seven original songs and three cover versions of Christmas standards and carols, including a duet with Darlene Love.

The album received polarizing reviews from music critics. It peaked at number 28 on the US Billboard 200 and number 4 on both Billboard's Top Holiday Albums and Top R&B/Hip-Hop Albums. Being a steady seller throughout the Christmas season, it was eventually certified platinum in 2002 by the Recording Industry Association of America (RIAA). In 2002, Sony Music released six of the album's tracks, along with two spiritual tracks from the same era, on the compilation album, Home for Christmas.

== Background ==
In September 1994, Vandross released his ninth studio album Songs, a collection of cover versions that produced the singles "Endless Love", "Always and Forever", and "Ain't No Stoppin' Us Now." It became Vandross' highest-charting album by then and earned four nominations at the 1995 Grammy Awards, including Best R&B Album. Work on his follow-up project and first Christmas album began the following year. Vandross reteamed with musicians Nat Adderley Jr. and Marcus Miller to produce songs for This Is Christmas and co-wrote all of the seven original tracks on it.

Apart from Adderley and Miller, Vandross consulted several close musical friends to work with him on the album, including singer Darlene Love and saxophonist Clarence Clemons of Bruce Springsteen's The E Street Band, both of whom contributed to the original song "I Listen to the Bells," as well as singer Cissy Houston, who provided backing vocals on several tracks, including the album's title song. Tawatha Agee, Fonzi Thornton and Valerie Simpson of Ashford & Simpson sang in the choir of "O Come, All Ye Faithful."

== Promotion ==
In November and December 1995, the album lent its title to a syndicated television special which was hosted by Vandross and featured songs from the album, as well as performances by special guests, including Houston, Paulette McWilliams, Thornton, Agee, and Adderley. The hour-long show also saw the premiere of the music video for Vandross' "Every Year, Every Christmas," the first single from This Is Christmas. In further promotion if the album, Vandross, along with NBC Today show co-host Katie Couric lit the 1995 Christmas tree at the Rockefeller Center where Vandross he also sung "O Come All Ye Faithful," accompanied by a 75-voice choir.

=== Reissues ===
In October 2012, Sony Music Special Products rearranged, expanded, and repackaged the album under the new title, The Classic Christmas Album. The additional tracks were odd songs Vandross had recorded for other Christmas releases, with "The Christmas Song" being previously released on A Very Special Christmas 2 (1992), "Have Yourself a Merry Little Christmas," a live duet with Chaka Khan, being a recording from the 1998 Soul Train Christmas Starfest and "May Christmas Bring You Happiness" and "At Christmas Time" taken from the compilation albumFunky Christmas (1976), released through Cotillion Records. Some of these songs were re-released on the 2023 three-track EP Luther Vandross Classic Christmas, issued by Primary Wave Music and The Luther Vandross Estate.

== Critical reception ==
Professional ratings
Review scores
Source	Rating
AllMusic	2/5 stars
Entertainment Weekly	B−
The New Rolling Stone Album Guide	4/5 stars
Rolling Stone	(mixed)

Cash Box critic Gil L. Robertson IV found the album was "a superb Christmas collection that will only add to his stature as the premiere male soul artist of this age. As with every Vandross project the music here excels in the area of execution, production and background support. Unlike so many other holiday projects, Vandross breathes new life into the solid, but often-heard standards he covers [...] Christmas records have become common place, however, this one is really special." Ebony editor Lynn Norment felt thath This Is Christmas "has an abundance of beautiful and romantic music that will get you in the mood to spend the holidays with someone: special. And his voice is in fine form [...]."

Variety's Tood Gilchrist wrote: "Featuring heartbreak ("Every Year, Every Christmas"), hearthside canoodling ("A Kiss for Christmas") and heavenly rapture ("O Come All Ye Faithful"), Vandross balances traditional music and an updated sensibility on a record that's as good for a Christmas Eve party as the ride to church the next morning." Chris Willman and Tiarra Mukherjee, writing for Entertainment Weekly, gave the album a B− rating and called it "a modest collection of Quiet Storm-style yuletide standards and soggy originals." AllMusic editor Roch Parisien rated the album two our five stars and declared This Christmas "one other slick, highly polished production piece." In a retrospective review, Vibe wrote about the album: "Perhaps believing he could bounce back with a Christmas album, he tried, and failed egregiously."

== Chart performance ==
This Is Christmas debuted at number 190 on the US Billboard 200 in the week of November 25, 1995. It eventually peaked at number 28 in the week ending December 30, 1995. The album also reached number four on both the Top Holiday Albums chart and the Top R&B/Hip-Hop Albums chart. Billboard ranked This Is Christmas 81st on its Top R&B/Hip-Hop Albums 1995 year-end chart. The album reached Gold status on December 19, 1995, and was certified Platinum by the Recording Industry Association of America (RIAA) on April 17, 2002.

== Track listing ==
This Is Christmas track listing
No.	Title	Writer(s)	Length
1.	"With a Christmas Heart"	Luther Vandross; Skip Anderson	4:04
2.	"This Is Christmas"	Vandross; Reed Vertelney	4:45
3.	"The Mistletoe Jam (Everybody Kiss Somebody)"	Vandross; Ivan Hampden Jr.	4:45
4.	"Every Year, Every Christmas"	Vandross; Richard Marx	5:06
5.	"My Favorite Things"	Richard Rodgers; Oscar Hammerstein II	5:58
6.	"Have Yourself a Merry Little Christmas"	Hugh Martin; Ralph Blane	5:05
7.	"I Listen to the Bells" (duet with Darlene Love)	Vandross; Fonzi Thornton	6:07
8.	"Please Come Home for Christmas"	Vandross; Anderson	3:37
9.	"A Kiss for Christmas"	Vandross; Hampden	4:12
10.	"O Come, All Ye Faithful"	John Francis Wade; Frederick Oakeley	4:19
Total length:			48:21

The Classic Christmas Album – Reissue
No.	Title	Writer(s)	Length
1.	"The Christmas Song"	Mel Tormé; Bob Wells	4:30
2.	"My Favorite Things"	Richard Rodgers; Oscar Hammerstein II	5:58
3.	"Have Yourself a Merry Little Christmas"	Hugh Martin; Ralph Blane	5:05
4.	"The Mistletoe Jam (Everybody Kiss Somebody)"	Luther Vandross; Ivan Hampden Jr.	4:45
5.	"With a Christmas Heart"	Vandross; Skip Anderson	4:04
6.	"I Listen to the Bells" (duet with Darlene Love)	Vandross; Fonzi Thornton	6:07
7.	"A Kiss for Christmas"	Vandross; Hampden	4:12
8.	"Every Year, Every Christmas"	Vandross; Richard Marx	5:06
9.	"This Is Christmas"	Vandross; Reed Vertelney	4:45
10.	"Please Come Home for Christmas"	Vandross; Anderson	3:37
11.	"O Come, All Ye Faithful"	Wade; Oakeley	4:19
12.	"Have Yourself a Merry Little Christmas" (Live) (duet with Chaka Khan)	Hugh Martin; Ralph Blane	5:11
13.	"May Christmas Bring You Happiness"	Vandross	4:27
14.	"At Christmas Time"	Vandross	5:03
Total length:			67:05

Notes

- "The Christmas Song" was previously released on the album A Very Special Christmas 2 (1992)
- "Have Yourself a Merry Little Christmas" (Live) was recorded at the 1998 Soul Train Christmas Starfest and was previously unreleased
- "May Christmas Bring You Happiness" and "At Christmas Time" were previously released on the album Funky Christmas (1976)

== Personnel ==
- Luther Vandross – lead vocals, backing vocals, arrangements (2, 3, 4, 7, 9), vocal arrangements (2, 3, 7, 8, 9), spoken vocals (3)
- John Anderson – acoustic piano (1, 8), synthesizers (1, 8), drums (1, 7–9), arrangements (1–4, 7–9), keyboards (2, 3, 7, 9), Fender Rhodes (4)
- Jason Miles – synthesizer sound programming (1–4, 7–9),
  drum programming (1–4, 7–9)
- Reed Vertelney – keyboards (2), drum programming (2), arrangements (2)
- Ivan Hampden Jr. – keyboards (3), drums (3, 5, 6, 9, 10), arrangements (3, 9)
- Nat Adderley Jr. – acoustic piano (4, 5, 6, 10), string arrangements (4), keyboards (5, 6), arrangements (5, 6)
- Eric Caudieux – synthesizer sound programming (5, 6)
- Paul Jackson Jr. – guitar (2–5, 7–10)
- Phil Hamilton – guitar (5, 6)
- Marcus Miller – bass (3, 4, 10), keyboards (10), Hammond B3 organ (10), arrangements (10), choir conductor (10)
- Luico Hopper – bass (5, 6)
- Eluriel "Tinker" Barfield – bass (7)
- Erroll "Crusher" Bennett – percussion (5)
- Steve Kroon – percussion (6)
- Dick Oatts – tenor saxophone solo (5, 6)
- Clarence Clemons – tenor saxophone solo (7)
- Richard Marx – arrangements (4)
- Earl McIntyre – horn orchestration (5, 6)
- Peter Dimitriades – string concertmaster (6)
- Alfred Brown – string contractor (6)
- John Clayton – string arrangements and conductor (10)
- Emile Charlap – orchestra contractor (10)
- Tawatha Agee – backing vocals (2, 3, 7, 8, 9)
- Robin Clark – backing vocals (2, 3, 7, 8, 9)
- Milt Grayson – backing vocals (2)
- Cissy Houston – backing vocals (2, 3, 7, 9)
- Paulette McWilliams – backing vocals (2, 3, 7, 8, 9)
- Cindy Mizelle – backing vocals (2, 3, 7, 8, 9)
- Fonzi Thornton – backing vocals (2, 3, 7, 8, 9), vocal contractor,
  vocal arrangements (7)
- Brenda White-King – backing vocals (2, 3, 7, 9)
- Darlene Love – backing vocals (3), lead vocals (7)
- Kevin Owens – backing vocals (7)

Choir on "O' Come All Ye Faithful"

- Tawatha Agee, Katreese Barns, Vivian Cherry, Robin Clark, Ada Dyer, Genobia Jeter, Yvonne Lewis, Paulette McWilliams, Kevin Owens
  Tamira C. Sanders, Valerie Simpson, Fonzi Thornton (choir contractor)

Production

- Luther Vandross – producer (1–4, 7–9), executive producer
- Nat Adderley Jr. – producer (5, 6)
- Marcus Miller – producer (10)
- Ray Bardani – audio recording (1–4, 7–9), lead vocal recording (5, 6, 9), mixing
- Paul Brown – audio recording (5, 6)
- Stan Wallace – audio recording (5, 6)
- Dan Wojnar – audio recording (9)
- Joe Ferla – orchestra recording (9)
- David Ward – additional recording, sound designer (10)
- Tony Duino-Black – assistant engineer
- Paul Falcone – assistant engineer
- Robert Friedrich – assistant engineer
- Carl Glanville – assistant engineer
- Geraldo Lopez – assistant engineer
- Aya Takemura – assistant engineer
- Max Risenhoover – digital editing (1–5, 7–10)
- Eric Caudieux – digital editing (2, 5, 7)
- Ted Jensen – mastering
- Marsha Burns – project coordinator
- George Corsillo – design
- Patti Manzone – design
- Alberto Tolot – photography
- Jeff Jones – hair, makeup

== Charts ==
=== Weekly charts ===
Weekly chart performance for This Is Christmas
Chart (1995)	Peak position
US Billboard 200	28
US Top Holiday Albums (Billboard)	4
US Top R&B/Hip-Hop Albums (Billboard)	4

=== Year-end charts ===
Year-end chart performance for This Is Christmas
Chart (1996)	Position
US Billboard 200	175
US Top R&B/Hip-Hop Albums (Billboard)	81

== Certifications ==
Certifications for This Is Christmas
Region	Certification	Certified units/sales
United States (RIAA)	Platinum	1,000,000^{^}
^{^} Shipments figures based on certification alone.
