= SteffNasty =

American songwriter

Steffon Reed, better known by his moniker SteffNasty, is an American songwriter, record producer, and co-owner of BeatBanggahz Entertainment. He is best known for "Determination", recorded by Raekwon for the video game Gran Turismo 3 and Trey Songz "In The Middle" featured on I Gotta Make It.

In addition to recording placements, SteffNasty scored and appeared in the documentary, Real Dads: Black Men on Fatherhood. He, along with his partner, received the award for Producer of the Year at the 2009 Underground Music Awards held in New York City.

SteffNasty is currently writing and producing for Grammy Award winning songwriter, Gordon Chambers, on his third studio album, rock&B innovator Lydia Caesar, and KQuick of the production group, Grand Staff.

== Discography ==
=== 2001 ===
- Raekwon "Determination" Gran Turismo 3 Sony/Epic
- Kenny Lattimore "Weekend" Weekend/Arista

=== 2005 ===
- Trey Songz "In The Middle" I Gotta Make ItI Gotta Make It Songbook/Atlantic
- Trey Songz "Hatin Love" I Gotta Make It Songbook/Atlantic

=== 2006 ===
- Black Buddafly "Dirty Little Trick" RSMG/Def Jam

=== 2007 ===
- Black Buddafly "It's Us Bitches" (remix)

=== 2009 ===
- Lydia Caesar "Summer Vacation"/Summer Vacation
- Wish "Turquoise" Skool Gurl Diaries/Beat Banggahz Entertainment
- Wish "Don't Let Him See You Cry" Skool Gurl Diaries/Beat Banggahz Entertainment
- Ahmaad "Sweet Nightmare" "Butterflies"(MJ Tribute) Amazin

=== 2010 ===
- Oshy "Undisputed" If I/Sony Music Japan International
- Lydia Caesar "Summer Vacation" EP/SoulSpazm Records
- "Summer Vacation"(Main Mix)
- "Summer Vacation"(Acoustic Mix)
- "Summer Vacation"(Acapella)
- "Summer Vacation"(instrumental
- Jimmie Reign "Out The Door" Pretty Girl/Red Honey/JayR Presents
- SteffNasty (featuring The commission) "Beamer, Benz or Bentley" (R&B Remix)
- SteffNasty (featuring Jaiden The Cure & Gordon Chambers) Music

(*)denotes that the song has been independently released and consistently performed in live forums

=== 2000 ===
- Nivea "The Date"
- Sol "Looking for Love"
- Rob Scott "You're Gonna Lose"
- Rob Scott "Suga"
- Rob Scott "What's Good"
- Rob Scott "I Got Love (On Reservation)"
- Rob Scott "Hope Ya Feelin"
- Tyler "Everything"
- J-Reed "Internet Chick"

=== 2001 ===
- Lil Eddie "Can't Go Back to You"
- Lil Eddie "Can't Believe"
- Lil Eddie "Turn Back Time"
- Lil Eddie "Hooked On You"
- Tyler "What's The Reason"
- Tyler "Nuthin Compares"
- Tyler featuring Lil Eddie, J-Reed & SteffNasty "It's Over Now"

=== 2002 ===
- Jhene "Don't Walk Away"
- J-Reed "Last Time"
- J-Reed "All I Need"
- J-Reed "Twisted"
- J-Reed "In 2 Deep"
- Tyler "Got Me Sayin"
- Tyler "Your Love"
- Tyler "Let Me Know What's Up"
- UnLearn featuring Tyler "Right Place, Right Time"

=== 2003 ===
- Trey Songz "All My Life"
- Trey Songz & Ezekiel Lewis(The Clutch)Ezekiel Lewis "Window Shopping"
- Claude Kelly - New Shoes
- Claude Kelly "2nd Chances"
- Imajin "Only One for Me"
- Felica "Secret Letter"
- J-Reed "Turn Off The TV"
- J-Reed "Make a Change"
- Tyler "Perfect Girl"
- Tyler "Only One For Me"

=== 2004 ===
- Trey Songz "Pack Ya Bags"
- RL (of NEXT) "I Don't Give a Damn"
- Lil Mo "You Must Really Love Me"
- Claude Kelly "Backseat Love Affair"
- Claude Kelly "I Ain't The Man For You"
- Claude Kelly "Break the News"
- Claude Kelly "Us Time"
- Makeba Riddick "It's Your World"
- J-Reed "Love & Sex"
- Marquise Moss "Love & Sex"
- J-Reed "Temptation"
- Gordon Chambers "Lookin for Somebody"
- Mayaeni "Girlfriend"
- Mayaeni "Insane"
- Jayci "Girlfriend"
- Lyric "Why Did You Take Me Back"
- Duane Covert "We Both Know"
- Jamelle Jones "All of My Life"

=== 2005 ===
- Bridget Kelly "Because of You"
- Bridget Kelly "You Don't Know Me (The Gray Area)"
- Quana "Speed Bump"
- Quana "Drivin Me"
- Quana "Holla"
- Quana "Come On"
- Quana "Dont Let Cupid Fool Me"
- Quana "10pm"
- Quana "Dirty Little Trick"
- Script "Patty Cake"
- Script "Talkin To Myself"
- Script "If I Had a Penny"
- Script "Speed Bump"
- Script "Crush You"
- Script "Come On"
- Script "Drivin Me"
- Script "10pm"
- Oshy "Sophia Rain"
- 718 "Window Shopping"
- Jamelle Jones "Speed Bump"
- Jamelle Jones "Holla"

=== 2006 ===
- Sisqo "Sexual"
- Oshy "Dirty Rose"
- Quana "After Tha Rain"
- Wynter Gordon "No Part of You"
- Wynter Gordon "On The Grind"
- Claude Kelly "Lil Ol Me"
- Claude Kelly "Damn"
- Claude Kelly "Got to Go"
- Claude Kelly "After The Rain"
- Claude Kelly "Dirty Little Trick"
- Black Buddafly "Damn"
- Black Buddafly "Lil Ol Me"
- Black Buddafly "Like Dat"
- Nelson "New Shoes"
- Rufus Blaq "If This Is Making Love"
- J-Reed "When You Get Home""

=== 2007 ===
- Cheri Dennis & Angela Hunte "Oh No"
- Claude Kelly "One Week"
- Claude Kelly "Call Me Anytime"
- Quiona "Senses"
- Quiona "Got to Go"
- Makeba Riddick "Miss Me All You Want"
- Shay Winans "Good Girl"
- Mylah "Back Home"
- Mylah "Not That Type of Girl"
- TC "I Want More"
- Oshy "You, Me, and She"
- Eritza Laues "Not Up to Me"
- Karibel "U Got Me"
- Que Sylve "No Better Than You"
- Marc Villa "Sweat"
- Carmen Cameron "Low Riders"
- Hadiya & Myche "Hostage"

=== 2008 ===
- J.Holiday "Losing Myself"
- Oshy "No Better Than You"
- Jimmie Reign "Crazy"
- Jimmie Reign "Out The Door"
- Lydia Caesar "Me and a Fantasy"
- Lydia Caesar "1, 2, 3"
- Jimmie Reign "Bout It Thang"
- Sam Hook "The Wall"
- Sam Hook "Cinderella"
- The Commission "Undisputed"
- The Commission "Free"
- The Commission "Losing Myself"
- The Commission "Shotgun"
- The Commission "Call me"
- The Commission "Gravity"
- The Commission "Turn on the Lights"
- The Netw0rk "One Kiss"
- The Netw0rk "Hell No"
- The Netw0rk "Dance For Me"
- Chuka (knightwritaz) & F'Lana "Soar The Sky"
- Chuka (knightwritaz) "Your Baby"
- Chuka (knightwritaz) "Blind"
- B.Gibbs "Do You Feel?"
- Carmen Cameron "On My Way'

=== 2009 ===
- Denice Stone "Rock On"
- Denice Stone "Black Roses"
- Denice Stone "Slippin Away"
- Denice Stone "In the Fast Lane"
- Denice Stone "Soar The Sky"
- Gordon Chambers "That Ain't Love"
- Gordon Chambers "Sincere"
- Lee Carr "So Amazing"
- Black Buddafly "Custom Made"
- Oshy "Broadcast Our Love"
- Oshy "Turn on the Lights"
- Oshy "Undisputed"
- Lydia Caesar "Love Machine"
- Lydia Caesar "Strong Enough"
- P Murray "I'm Not Jesus"
- Eric Lamont "Because of You"
- Eric Lamont "Kiss & Makeup"
- Eric Lamont "Deeper"
- Eric Lamont "Stole My Heart"
- Astro aka The Astronomical Kid "Puppy Love"
- Karibel "Take Me Away"
- Karibel "Mess Up Makeup"
- Karibel "Soar the Sky"
- Bruce Miller "Lucky Girl"
- Kes Kaos "Black Widow"
- Terelle Tipton "I'm Over You"
- Lee Charm "Magnetic"
- Donny Roc "Reach Away"
- Donny Roc "Strange"
- J-Hype "Amazing"
- J-Hype "So Sick of Falling in Love"
- Ahmaad "Sweet Nightmare"
- Que Sylve "Rain Check"
- The Commission "Bachelor Forever"
- The Commission "Clean It Up"
- The Commission "Sincere"
- SWV "Real Love" (SteffNasty Remix)

=== 2010 ===
- The Commission "Ignited"
- Que Sylve "Drum"
- Rocki Evans "No Hard Feelings"
- Rocki Evans "Forgive Me"
- Jonte "Gone"
