= Miss Patti's Christmas =

Studio album by Patti LaBelle
- Released: October 9, 2007
- Length: 42:49
- Label: Def Soul Classics
- Producer: Jimmy Jam & Terry Lewis

Patti LaBelle chronology
The Gospel According to Patti LaBelle (2006)	Miss Patti's Christmas (2007)	Live in Washington, D.C. (2008)

Miss Patti's Christmas is a studio album by American singer Patti LaBelle. Her second holiday album, it was released by Def Soul Classics on October 9, 2007 in the United States. Chiefly produced by Jimmy Jam & Terry Lewis, it marked LaBelle's first Def Jam recording since abruptly leaving the label in 2006 over a dispute with then-president Antonio "L.A." Reid. Miss Patti's Christmas peaked at number 22 on the US Top Holiday Albums.

== Critical reception ==
Professional ratings
Review scores
Source	Rating
About.com	3.5/5 stars
AllMusic	3/5 stars

Andy Kellman from AllMusic found that "it's not a given that the disc will become part of each listener's annual holiday listening tradition, but it's all pleasant and enjoyable, and there are several moments where it is obvious that LaBelle is giving everything she has, rather than coasting through [...] Jam, Lewis, and LaBelle should seriously consider repurposing the very upbeat "Nativity" – one of four originals – into a song with an everyday lyrical theme. It's too well-made to be suitable only for once-a-year rotation."

== Track listing ==
No.	Title	Writer(s)	Producer(s)	Length
1.	"Christmas Jam"	Bobby Ross Avila; Issiah J. Avila; James Harris III; Terry Lewis	Jimmy Jam and Terry Lewis; Avila Brothers^{[A]}	4:18
2.	"It's the Most Wonderful Time of the Year"	Edward Pola; George Wyle	Jam; Lewis; James "Big Jim" Wright	3:08
3.	"What Do the Lonely Do at Christmas?"	Homer Banks; Carl Hampton	Jam; Lewis; Wright	4:07
4.	"Holidays Mean More to Me"	Harris; Lewis; Wright	Jam; Lewis; Wright	4:38
5.	"It's Going to Be a Merry Christmas"	Harris; Lewis; Wright	Jam; Lewis; Wright	4:34
6.	"Do You Hear What I Hear?"	Gloria Shain; Noel Regney	Jam; Lewis; Wright	5:01
7.	"Nativity"	B. Avila; I. Avila; Harris; Lewis	Jam; Lewis; Avila Brothers^{[A]}	3:47
8.	"Jesus, Oh What a Wonderful Child" (featuring The Soul Seekers)	Traditional	Jam; Lewis; Wright	4:04
9.	"Every Year, Every Christmas"	Luther Vandross; Richard Marx	Jam; Lewis; Wright	5:24
10.	"Away in a Manger"	Traditional	Jam; Lewis; Wright	3:48
Total length:				42:49

Notes

- ^{^[A]} denotes vocals producer

== Charts ==
Chart (2007)	Peak position
US Billboard 200	174
US Top Holiday Albums (Billboard)	22
US Top R&B/Hip-Hop Albums (Billboard)	26
