= Love Is on the Way (album) =

Love Is On the Way

Compilation album by Luther Vandross
- Released: May 26, 1998 (US)
- Genre: R&B, soul
- Length: 48:58
- Label: Sony Music Special Products

Luther Vandross chronology
| One Night with You: The Best of Love, Volume 2 (1997) | Love Is On the Way (1998) | I Know (1998) |

Love Is On the Way is a compilation album by American R&B/soul singer Luther Vandross, released in 1998.

Professional ratings
Review scores
| Source | Rating |
|---|---|
| Allmusic | link |

== Track listing ==
1. "Power of Love/Love Power" - 6:44
2. "Once You Know How" - 4:37
3. "Love the One You're With" - 5:05
4. "Come Back" - 4:16
5. "Sugar and Spice (I Found Me a Girl)" - 4:59
6. "Reflections" - 3:22
7. "Love Is On the Way (Real Love)" - 4:43
8. "Goin' Out of My Head" - 5:19
9. "I Gave It Up (When I Fell in Love)" - 4:46
10. "Here and Now" - 5:22

== Certifications ==
| Region | Certification | Certified units/sales |
|---|---|---|
| United States (RIAA) | Gold | 500,000^{‡} |
^{‡} Sales+streaming figures based on certification alone.
