= Heart Attack (Trey Songz song) =

Single by Trey Songz

from the album Chapter V
- Released: March 26, 2012
- Genre: R&B; electropop
- Length: 3:55
- Label: Songbook; Atlantic
- Songwriters: Tremaine Neverson; Richard Butler; Benjamin Levin
- Producers: Benny Blanco; Rico Love

Trey Songz singles chronology
"Unusual" (2011)	"Heart Attack" (2012)	"2 Reasons" (2012)

Music video
- "Heart Attack" on YouTube

"Heart Attack" is a song by American singer Trey Songz. It was produced by Benny Blanco and Rico Love and released as the lead single from Trey Songz's fifth studio album, Chapter V on March 26, 2012. It reached the top 40 in the United Kingdom, peaking at number 28 on the UK Singles Chart and peaked at number 35 in the United States on the US Billboard Hot 100. "Heart Attack" received a nomination for Best R&B Song at the 2013 Grammy Awards.

== Music video ==
The video was filmed on April 7, 2012. It was directed by Benny Boom. The video was released on May 4, 2012. Kelly Rowland plays Songz' love interest in the video.

== Charts ==
=== Weekly charts ===
Chart (2012)	Peak position
Australia (ARIA)	70
France (SNEP)	139
UK Singles (Official Charts)	28
UK Hip Hop/R&B (Official Charts)	7
US Billboard Hot 100	35
US Hot R&B/Hip-Hop Songs (Billboard)	3
US Rhythmic Airplay (Billboard)	7
US Adult R&B Songs (Billboard)	12
US Hot R&B Songs (Billboard)	6

=== Year-end charts ===
Chart (2012)	Position
US Billboard Hot 100	77
US Hot R&B/Hip-Hop Songs (Billboard)	7
US Rhythmic (Billboard)	15

== Certifications ==
Region	Certification	Certified units/sales
United States (RIAA)	Platinum	1,000,000^{‡}
^{‡} Sales+streaming figures based on certification alone.
