= Prudencesa Renfro =

American singer-songwriter

- Born: Houston, Texas
- Other name: Pru
- Education: Texas Southern University
- Occupations: Singer; songwriter

Prudencesa Renfro, known professionally as Pru, is an American singer-songwriter. Raised in South Park, Houston, Renfro gained public recognition after being signed to Capitol Records and releasing her debut album Pru in 2000.

== Career ==
=== Early life and career beginnings ===
Prudencesa Renfro was raised in South Park, Houston, by her mother Patsy Renfro. She has three older siblings. Renfro became interested in music at a young age, and performed in bars while working as a bartender. She wrote song lyrics and poetry while attending high school and then Texas Southern University, coupling her lyrics with the music of other artists such as Michael Jackson, Rachelle Ferrell, Sade, Naughty by Nature, the Isley Brothers, and Miles Davis.

Renfro later moved to Los Angeles to further pursue her music career. Renfro became professionally known as Pru, and was signed through Warner/Chappell Music Publishing by Capitol Records' executive Roy Lott. Lott said that he was drawn to her songwriting and voice. Her demo was produced by Jack Ponti of CazzyDog Management and helped her to secure the record deal.

=== Pru ===
Renfro's debut album Pru was released on November 7, 2000. According to Billboard magazine, Capitol Records had placed significant focus on the marketing for the album, including the release of an electronic press kit and promotion through "non-retail accounts". Lott told Billboard that Renfro would act as a primary part of Capitol Records' attempt to attract a wider audience with her crossover appeal. Pru reached a peak position of number 176 on the Billboard 200, spending two weeks on the chart, and peaked on Billboard's R&B Albums at number 38, leaving the chart after thirty-two weeks.

Two singles – "Candles" and "Aaroma (of a Man)" [sic] – were released from the album. "Candles" reached number 68 on the Hot R&B/Hip-Hop Songs Billboard chart where it spent fourteen weeks, and peaked at number 65 on the R&B/Hip-Hop Airplay Billboard chart where it spent ten weeks. Renfro's style was compared to contemporary neo soul performers, such as Lauryn Hill, Macy Gray, and Erykah Badu.
