= Your Secret Love (song) =

Single by Luther Vandross

from the album Your Secret Love
- Released: August 20, 1996 (US, Europe)
- Length: 4:01 (single edit)
- Label: Epic
- Songwriters: L. Vandross; Reed Vertelney
- Producer: Luther Vandross

Luther Vandross singles chronology
| "Every Year, Every Christmas" (1995) | "Your Secret Love" (1996) | "I Can Make It Better" (1996) |

"Your Secret Love" is a song by American recording artist Luther Vandross, released in August 1996, by Epic Records, as the lead single from his studio album of the same name (1996). Is is written by Vandross with Reed Vertelney, and he also produced it. The single peaked at No. 5 on the US Billboard Hot R&B Singles chart and No. 14 on the UK Singles Chart. It also reached numbers 52 and 59 on the Billboard Hot 100 and Cash Box Top 100 charts.

== Critical reception ==
Larry Flick from Billboard magazine described the song as "languid", adding that it "serves as a solid reminder that few can brew classic finger-snappin' rhythms and warmly romantic lyrics this well. Vandross' narrative is so precise and vivid that you can almost feel the candlelight as he cruises through the song's plush, quietly unfurling arrangement. Programmers should play this single as a textbook lesson for youngsters on how R&B balladry is done properly." Peter Miro from Cash Box remarked that "Your Secret Love" "has the elements of his patented style: a soothing serenade, emotive backup vocals, sustained notes held over the refrain, a romantic flair. Altogether it's spelled "chartbound"."

British magazine Music Week rated the song three out of five, writing, "This slick, somewhat passionless mid-tempo ballad is definitive Luther, and should please pop radio." Music Week editor, Alan Jones, stated that Vandross "is back on form" on "a slow-burning R&B plodder". He added that it "has a warmly familiar feel, and Luther's honeyed vocals lend it a pedigree few can match." Ralph Tee from the Record Mirror Dance Update commented, "Luther's still got one of the best voices in the business, and here he sounds as good as ever on a brand new beat ballad that seems to have been landed on us out of nowhere. The song itself is not the greatest he's ever done, but a crispy urban mix is very agreeable indeed and for more welcome than another cover version."

== Track list ==
- US, UK CD single
1. "Your Secret Love (Single Mix)" - 4:01
2. "Your Secret Love (Remix)", produced by Frankie Knuckles - 4:02
3. "Power Of Love/Love Power (Power Remix)" - 4:15
4. "Please Come Home For Christmas" - 3:37

== Charts ==
=== Weekly charts ===
| Chart (1996) | Peak position |
|---|---|
| Australia (ARIA) | 165 |
| UK Singles (Official Charts) | 14 |
| US Adult R&B Songs (Billboard) | 1 |
| US Billboard Hot 100 | 52 |
| US Hot R&B/Hip-Hop Songs (Billboard) | 5 |
| US Cash Box Top 100 | 59 |

=== Year-end charts ===
| Chart (1996) | Position |
|---|---|
| US Hot R&B/Hip-Hop Songs (Billboard) | 73 |
