= The Gospel According to Patti LaBelle =

Studio album by Patti LaBelle
- Released: November 21, 2006
- Length: 47:17
- Label: Umbrella; Bungalo
- Producer: Del Atkins; Makhosini “Omari” Dlamini; Eddie Brown; Gordon Chambers; Dean "DC" Charles; Jonathan DeLise; Thianar Gomis; Gerald Haddon; Sami McKinney; PAJAM; Scott "Shavoni" Parker; The Soul Seekers; Nisan Stewart; Troy Taylor

Patti LaBelle chronology
The Definitive Collection (2006)	The Gospel According to Patti LaBelle (2006)	Miss Patti's Christmas (2007)

The Gospel According to Patti LaBelle is the first gospel album by American singer Patti LaBelle. It was released on November 21, 2006, through music executive Jheryl Busby's indie label Umbrella Recordings and Bungalo Records.

== Background ==
The project began three years before its release when LaBelle's late musical director and close friend Budd Ellison told a skeptical LaBelle that "it's now or never, Patti." The album is dedicated to his memory as he succumbed to prostate cancer before the album saw a release. The Gospel According To Patti LaBelle features collaborations with Yolanda Adams, Mary Mary, Kanye West, Wynonna Judd, The Soul Seekers, Tye Tribbett, CeCe Winans, and more. Production duties were handled by Gordon Chambers, J. Moss, Scott "Shavoni" Parker, Troy Taylor, Gerald Haddon, Jon DeLise, and others. Orchestra arranger and conductor was Louis Anthony deLise.

== Critical reception ==
Professional ratings
Review scores
Source	Rating
AllMusic	2.5/5 stars
People	3/4 stars
USA Today	3/4 stars

AllMusic editor Andree Farias found that "it's a pretentious title coming from someone who isn't a full-time practitioner in the genre [...] but this Gospel is nowhere near such transcendence, not by a long shot. There's enough marquee value to the proceedings to convince even the staunchest gospel head that LaBelle is for real [...] but the performances are too placid and middling, even by contemporary gospel standards [...] It's almost as if LaBelle were more concerned with putting together a get-together than paying homage to her church roots [...] Instead, Gospel is rife with ultra-slick urban stylings and excessive believe-in-yourself platitudes."

Chuck Arnold and Jessica Herndon of People praised the album as a spirited and powerful gospel debut. They highlighted her passionate vocals and the album's guest appearances, calling it a set that would appeal to longtime fans and new listeners alike. Steve Jones of USA Today gave The Gospel According to Patti LaBelle a three-star rating, praising the singer's gospel debut for its uplifting spirit and heartfelt vocals. He highlighted guest appearances from CeCe Winans, Yolanda Adams, and Kanye West, as well as LaBelle's reworking of "You Are My Friend."

== Commercial performance ==
The Gospel According to Patti LaBelle debuted on the US Billboard 200 at number 86, selling about 18,000 copies in its first week. It also peaked at number 17 on Billboard's Top R&B/Hip-Hop Albums chart and atop the Top Gospel Albums chart for 17 weeks. "Where Love Begins," a duet with Yolanda Adams, was played frequently on R&B and gospel radio stations and debuted at number 68 on the Hot R&B/Hip-Hop Songs. Second single "Anything" featuring Kanye West, Mary Mary, and Consequence hit number 64 on the same chart.

== Awards ==
In 2008, the album was nominated for a Dove Award for Contemporary Gospel Album of the Year at the 39th GMA Dove Awards.

== Track listing ==
No.	Title	Writer(s)	Producer(s)	Length
1.	"Did You Pray Today"	Michael O'Hara; Sami McKinney	McKinney; Scott "Shavoni" Parker; Thianar Gomis; Dean "DC" Charles	4:32
2.	"Where Love Begins" (featuring Yolanda Adams)	Denise Rich; Gordon Chambers; Rick Williams; Troy Taylor	Chambers; Taylor	3:27
3.	"Anything" (featuring Mary Mary)	Gerald Haddon; Nisan Stewart	McKinney; Haddon; Stewart	4:44
4.	"Walk Around Heaven"	Cassietta George	McKinney; Stewart; Brown	3:47
5.	"More Than (He Loves You)" (featuring J. Moss)	Keisha N. Allen; Paul D. Allen	PAJAM	3:56
6.	"God Ain't Through" (featuring The Soul Seekers)	McKinney; Warryn Campbell	McKinney; The Soul Seekers	4:54
7.	"I Just Love Him So"	Rich; Kenny Moore; McKinney	McKinney; Parker	4:43
8.	"Walking Away" (featuring CeCe Winans)	Chambers; Taylor	Chambers; Taylor	3:52
9.	"My Everything" (featuring Wynonna)	McKinney	McKinney	3:09
10.	"Anything" (featuring Kanye West, Mary Mary & Consequence)	Omari Dlamini: Haddon; Stewart; West	Haddon; Stewart; McKinney	5:48
11.	"You Are My Best Friend"	Armstead Edwards; Budd Ellison; Patti LaBelle	McKinney; Jonathan DeLise; Del Atkins; Dean "DC" Charles	4:52
Total length:				47:17

== Charts ==
=== Weekly charts ===
Chart (2006)	Peak position
US Billboard 200	86
US Top Gospel Albums (Billboard)	1
US Top R&B/Hip-Hop Albums (Billboard)	17

=== Year-end charts ===
Chart (2007)	Position
US Top Gospel Albums (Billboard)	2
US Top R&B/Hip-Hop Albums (Billboard)	90
