= Ivan Hampden Jr. =

American jazz musician

Ivan Hampden Jr. (born April 1, 1958 in New York, New York) is an American jazz and R&B drummer, composer, and record producer. He was Luther Vandross’ tour and session drummer from 1987 to 2003.

== Biography ==
Ivan Hampden grew up in the New York City neighborhood of Harlem. He started drumming at age 8, and established himself as a working musician by age 14, playing local bars and events. While attending college at Bronx Community College and Rutgers University, he joined the percussion ensemble at the Dance Theatre of Harlem, and began working with singer Eartha Kitt. He went on to write and produce rap albums, and toured with Kurtis Blow on Rick James' Cold Blooded album tour in 1983. In the mid-1980s he was introduced to songwriting/recording team Ashford & Simpson, and later joined Luther Vandross’ band as drummer and songwriter until Vandross’ death in 2005. Throughout his career, Hampden toured and performed with a number of celebrated artists, including Roberta Flack, Chaka Khan, Jennifer Lopez, Bonnie Raitt, India Arie, Stevie Wonder, Dionne Warwick, Little Richard, Gladys Knight, Vanessa Williams, among many others.

Hampden was recognized for his participation as Arranger/Musician/Programmer on two Grammy Award-winning recordings at the 2004 Grammy Awards: Best R&B Album "Dance With My Father" performed by Luther Vandross, and Best R&B Performance By A Duo or Group with Vocals "The Closer I Get to You" performed by Beyoncé and Luther Vandross.

Today, he lives with his wife in Clayton, NC which is a suburb of Raleigh, North Carolina. He continues to play, write and produce. He also taught recording production at North Carolina Central University. He offers private drum lessons at a local music academy and has founded a school of percussion in Clayton, NC.

== Equipment ==
Hampden plays Yamaha drums with Vic Firth sticks and records with Samson Technologies gear.

== Discography ==
- Treacherous Cousin Ice
- Cousin Ice (1980) Cousin Ice
- Red Hot Rhythm & Blues (1987) Diana Ross
- Move to This (1990) Cathy Dennis
- Love Life (1991) Akiko Yano
- That Time Again (1991) Kevin Owens
- Get Ta Know Ya Betta (1992) M & M
- Never Let Me Go (1993) Luther Vandross
- The Voice (1993) Mavis Staples
- A To a Higher Place (1994) Tramaine Hawkins
- Rendezvous (1994) Darryl Tookes
- Roberta (1995) Roberta Flack
- This Is Christmas (1995) Luther Vandross
- Gospel According to Ashford & Simpson (1996) Ashford & Simpson
- Inner City Blues (1996) Doc Powell
- Your Secret Love (1996) Luther Vandross
- Gablz (1997) Gablz
- Until (1997) Byron Miller
- Down in the Delta (1998)
- I Know (1998) Luther Vandross
- In My Path (2000) Steve Kroon
- Awesome (2001) The Temptations
- Life Changes (2001) Doc Powell
- Luther Vandross (2001) Luther Vandross
- The Ultimate Luther Vandross (2001) Luther Vandross
- It Started with a Dream (2002) Cy Coleman
- Mi Alma Latina: My Latin Soul (2002) Néstor Torres
- Dance With My Father (2003) Luther Vandross
- Dangerously in Love (2003) Beyoncé
- Live Radio City Music Hall 2003 (2003) Luther Vandross
- The Essential Luther Vandross (2003) Luther Vandross
- Ultimate Easy Album (2005)
- Yuletide Friends (2005) Doug Gazlay
- Blues for the Tribe (2006) Baron Tyrnas
- Just Norwood (2007) Norwood Young
- Love, Luther (2007) Luther Vandross
- Luther Vandross [Madacy] (2007) Luther Vandross
- Soul Desirables (2007)
- Dangerously in Love/Live at Wembley (2008) Beyoncé
- The Music of Luther Vandross (2009) Luther Vandross
- The Classic Christmas Album (2012) Luther Vandross
