= Reed Vertelney =

- Born: Reed Philip Vertelney
- Genres: Pop, R&B, soul
- Occupations: Musician, songwriter, record producer, composer, multi-instrumentalist, engineer
- Instruments: Drums, guitar, keyboards, piano
- Years active: 1989–present

Reed Philip Vertelney is an American record producer, songwriter, composer, and multi-instrumentalist from Calabasas, CA. He has written, produced, played, and worked for and with artists such as Michael Jackson, Luther Vandross, Marcus Miller, Charlie Wilson, Kenny Lattimore, Evelyn "Champagne" King, Marc Anthony, Destiny's Child/Beyoncé, Natalie Grant, Jason Mraz, Clay Aiken, Elliott Yamin, 98 Degrees, Snoop Dogg, Smokey Robinson, Gladys Knight, and many more, as well as companies such as Walt Disney Records (Lemonade Mouth). He studied at the Berklee College of Music and shares two Grammy nominations with Luther Vandross in 1997 for "Your Secret Love" (Best R&B Song) and in 1994 for "Heaven Knows" (Best R&B Song (Songwriter)).
