= Greatest Hits (Luther Vandross album) =

Greatest hits album by Luther Vandross
- Released: November 16, 1999 (US)
- Genre: R&B, soul
- Length: 72:39
- Label: Epic
- Producer: Luther Vandross, Walter Afanasieff, Marcus Miller, Jacques Fred Petrus, Leo Sacks (compilation producer)

Luther Vandross chronology
Always & Forever: The Classics (1998)	Greatest Hits (1999)	Super Hits (2000)

Professional ratings
Review scores
Source	Rating
Allmusic	link
Entertainment Weekly	B− link
Robert Christgau	link

Greatest Hits is a greatest hits album by American R&B/soul singer Luther Vandross, released in 1999 (see 1999 in music).

== Track listing ==
1. "Never Too Much" – 3:51 (From Never Too Much)
2. "Don't Want to Be a Fool" – 4:35 (From Power of Love)
3. "Here and Now" – 5:22 (From The Best of Luther Vandross... The Best of Love)
4. "Love the One You're With" – 5:03 (From Songs)
5. "Any Love" – 5:00 (From Any Love)
6. "Superstar/Until You Come Back to Me (That's What I'm Gonna Do)" – 9:15 (From Busy Body)
7. "A House Is Not a Home" – 7:07 (From Never Too Much)
8. "Give Me the Reason" – 4:45 (From Give Me the Reason)
9. "There's Nothing Better Than Love" (with Gregory Hines) – 4:42 (From Give Me the Reason)
10. "Creepin'" – 4:04 (From The Night I Fell in Love)
11. "So Amazing" – 3:39 (From Give Me the Reason)
12. "Stop to Love" – 5:10 (From Give Me the Reason)
13. "Power of Love/Love Power" – 6:41 (From Power of Love)
14. "How Many Times Can We Say Goodbye" (with Dionne Warwick) – 3:25 (From Busy Body)

== Certifications ==
Region	Certification	Certified units/sales
United States (RIAA)	Platinum	1,000,000^{^}
^{^} Shipments figures based on certification alone.
