= The Best of Luther Vandross... The Best of Love =

- Cover art by Raul Colon

Greatest hits album by Luther Vandross
- Released: October 4, 1989
- Recorded: 1980–1989
- Genre: R&B, soul, pop, adult contemporary
- Length: 117:19
- Label: Epic
- Producer: Luther Vandross, Marcus Miller, Jacques Fred Petrus

Luther Vandross chronology
Any Love (1988)	The Best of Luther Vandross... The Best of Love (1989)	Power of Love (1991)

Professional ratings
Review scores
Source	Rating
Allmusic	5/5 stars
Chicago Tribune	4/4 stars
Robert Christgau	A−
Rolling Stone	4.5/5 stars

The Best of Luther Vandross... The Best of Love is the first compilation album by American singer Luther Vandross, released on October 4, 1989. It contains two previously unreleased songs, "Here and Now"—which became Vandross' first top ten pop hit and won the Grammy Award for Best R&B Vocal Performance, Male in 1991—and the 1990 US #5 R&B single "Treat You Right".

== Track listing ==
=== Disc one ===
Side one
No.	Title	Writer(s)	Length
1.	"Searching" (Change featuring Luther Vandross) (From Change's The Glow of Love, 1980)	Mauro Malavasi, Wayne Garfield, Paul Slade, Tanyayette Willoughby	8:02
2.	"The Glow of Love" (Change featuring Luther Vandross) (From Change's The Glow of Love)	David Romani, Garfield, Malavasi	6:12
3.	"Never Too Much" (From Never Too Much, 1981)	Luther Vandross	3:52
4.	"If This World Were Mine" (Duet with Cheryl Lynn) (From Lynn's Instant Love, 1982)	Marvin Gaye	5:24
5.	"A House Is Not a Home" (From Never Too Much)	Burt Bacharach, Hal David	7:09

Side two
No.	Title	Writer(s)	Length
6.	"Bad Boy/Having a Party" (From Forever, for Always, for Love, 1982)	Sam Cooke, Vandross, Marcus Miller	5:19
7.	"Since I Lost My Baby" (From Forever, for Always, for Love)	Smokey Robinson, Warren Moore	5:23
8.	"Promise Me" (From Forever, for Always, for Love)	Vandross	4:42
9.	"Til My Baby Comes Home" (From The Night I Fell in Love, 1985)	Vandross, Miller	5:34
10.	"If Only for One Night/Creepin'" (From The Night I Fell in Love)	Brenda Russell, Stevie Wonder	8:20

=== Disc two ===
Side three
No.	Title	Writer(s)	Length
1.	"Superstar/Until You Come Back to Me (That's What I'm Gonna Do)" (From Busy Body, 1983)	Leon Russell, Bonnie Bramlett, Wonder, Morris Broadnax, Clarence Paul	9:18
2.	"Stop to Love" (From Give Me the Reason, 1986)	Vandross, Nat Adderley Jr.	5:09
3.	"So Amazing" (From Give Me the Reason)	Vandross	3:43
4.	"There's Nothing Better Than Love" (Duet with Gregory Hines) (From Give Me the Reason)	Vandross, Skip Anderson	4:44
5.	"Give Me the Reason" (From Give Me the Reason)	Vandross, Adderley	4:45

Side four
No.	Title	Writer(s)	Length
6.	"Any Love" (From Any Love, 1988)	Vandross, Miller	5:03
7.	"I Really Didn't Mean It" (From Give Me the Reason)	Vandross, Miller	5:43
8.	"Love Won't Let Me Wait" (From Any Love)	Bobby Eli, Vinnie Barrett	7:20
9.	"Treat You Right" (Previously Unreleased)	Vandross, Miller	6:37
10.	"Here and Now" (Previously Unreleased)	Terry Steele, David L. Elliott	5:23

Notes

- "If This World Were Mine" is a Marvin Gaye and Tammi Terrell cover (1967)
- "A House Is Not a Home" is a Dionne Warwick cover (1964)
- "Since I Lost My Baby" is a cover of the Temptations (1965)
- "If Only for One Night" is a Brenda Russell cover (1979)
- "Creepin'" is a Stevie Wonder cover (1977)
- "Superstar" is a Delaney & Bonnie cover (1969)
- "Until You Come Back to Me (That's What I'm Gonna Do)" is an Aretha Franklin cover (1973)
- "Love Won't Let Me Wait" is a Major Harris cover (1975)

== Charts ==
=== Weekly charts ===
Chart (1989)	Peak position
UK Albums (Official Charts)	23
US Billboard 200	26
US Top R&B/Hip-Hop Albums (Billboard)	2

=== Year-end charts ===
Chart (1990)	Position
U.S. Billboard 200	40
U.S. Top R&B/Hip-Hop Albums (Billboard)	10

== Certifications ==
Region	Certification	Certified units/sales
United States (RIAA)	3× Platinum	3,000,000^{^}
^{^} Shipments figures based on certification alone.
