= Treat You Right =

Single by Luther Vandross

from the album The Best of Luther Vandross... The Best of Love
- B-side: "I Know You Want To"
- Released: 1990 (U.S., Europe)
- Length: 3:35 (Edit single)
- Label: Epic Records
- Songwriter(s): L. Vandross, M. Miller
- Producer(s): Luther Vandross, Marcus Miller

Luther Vandross singles chronology
"Here and Now" (1989)	"Treat You Right" (1990)	"Power of Love/Love Power" (1991)

"Treat You Right" is a song by American recording artist Luther Vandross. It was one of two new songs along with "Here and Now", both featured on Vandross' first greatest hits compilation The Best of Luther Vandross... The Best of Love. "Treat You Right" was released as a single in support of the album and was an R&B hit when it peaked at No. 5 in February 1990 on Billboard's Hot R&B Singles Chart.

== Critical reception ==
Bill Coleman from Billboard wrote, "Percolating new-jack-inspired percussion handily supports the soul master's reliably potent vocals on this new cut from his hits compilation. Proper remixes could transform this into a club smash."

== Track listing ==
US, UK Single

US Vinyl 7", Single

1. "Treat You Right" (Edit Single) - 3:35
2. "I Know You Want To" - 4:24

(Track 2: from Vandross 1988 album Any Love)

UK CD Single

1. "Treat You Right" (Edit Single) - 3:35
2. "Treat You Right" (LP Version) - 6:37
3. "The Glow of Love" - 6:11

== Personnel ==
- Luther Vandross – lead vocals, producer
- Marcus Miller – synthesizers, producer
- Jason Miles – synthesizer programming
- Paul Jackson Jr. – guitar
- Eugene Van Buren, Joey Diggs, Fred White, David Lasley, Arnold McCuller – background vocals
- Ray Bardani – engineer, mixing

== Charts ==
Chart (1990)	Peak position
UK Singles (OCC)	92
US Hot R&B Singles (Billboard)	5
