= Any Love =

Any Love may refer to:

- Any Love (album), a 1988 album by Luther Vandross
- "Any Love" (Luther Vandross song), 1988
- "Any Love" (Misia song), 2007
