= Little Miracles (Happen Every Day) =

Single by Luther Vandross

from the album Never Let Me Go
- Released: April 27, 1993 (US, Europe)
- Recorded: October 1992–February 1993
- Genre: R&B; adult contemporary
- Length: 4:43
- Label: Epic Records
- Songwriters: Luther Vandross; Marcus Miller
- Producers: Luther Vandross; Marcus Miller

Luther Vandross singles chronology
| "The Best Things in Life Are Free" (1992) | "Little Miracles (Happen Every Day)" (1993) | "Heaven Knows" (1993) |

Music video
- "Little Miracles (Happen Every Day)" on YouTube

"Little Miracles (Happen Every Day)" is a song by American recording artist Luther Vandross. Released in April 1993 by Epic Records, the single supports his platinum and eight album, Never Let Me Go (1993). The song was written by Vandross and Marcus Miller, and produced by them both. It became a top ten hit on the US Billboard Hot R&B Singles chart and reached top 30 on the UK Singles Chart. It also became the most successful single from the album on the Billboard Hot 100, peaking at number sixty-two. "Little Miracles (Happen Every Day)" was nominated for best R&B songwriting at the 36th Grammy Awards in March 1994 and won one of ASCAP's R&B Music Awards in June same year.

== Critical reception ==
Larry Flick from Billboard magazine described "Little Miracles (Happen Every Day)" as "a warm and familiar ballad fueled by his instantly recognizable voice and positive lyrics." He noted that it has "a grand, necessarily dramatic tone, with an arrangement overflowing with sweeping strings and a gospel-like choir of backing singers that includes Cissy Houston and Lisa Fischer." Randy Clark from Cash Box called it a "rich, mid-tempo blending of R&B with a large helping of Gospel".

A reviewer from People Magazine named it a "umpteenth ode to the power of love", adding that "bolstered by carefully layered and artfully displayed background vocals, the single is quietly triumphant." Leesa Daniels from Smash Hits gave it a full score of five out of five, writing, "This man has the best voice in the world, all hot chocolate and melted marshmallows. He makes you feel as though everything will be all right. This starts slowly but come the chorus you'll be screeching at the top of your lungs trying to hit the notes with the great man. It's like all his other records, but when they're this good, who cares?"

== Chart performance ==
"Little Miracles" was a moderate success upon its release, peaking at number 62 on the Billboard Hot 100 and number 30 on its Adult Contemporary chart. On the Hot R&B Singles chart, it was his overall 24th top ten R&B hit and became Vandross' eleventh consecutive top ten single and also his last in a row, ending a streak of top ten R&B hits that had started with "Any Love" in 1988 as the follow-up single, "Heaven Knows", only managed to reach number 24 on the chart, where it became his lowest R&B chart showing since "So Amazing" peaked at 94 on the chart back in 1987. In the UK, it was a moderate hit there as well, peaking at number 23.

== Track list ==
- US CD single
1. "Little Miracles (Happen Every Day)" - 4:10
2. "I'm Gonna Start Today - 6:10
- UK CD single
1. "Little Miracles (Happen Every Day)" - 4:10
2. "I'm Gonna Start Today" - 6:10
3. "Heart of a Hero" - 3:10

== Personnel ==
- Luther Vandross – lead vocals, vocal arrangement
- Marcus Miller – drum and percussion programming, keyboards, bass, music arrangement
- Jason Miles – sound programming
- Paul Jackson Jr. – guitar
- Cissy Houston, Fonzi Thornton, Lisa Fischer, Paulette McWilliams, Tawatha Agee, Brenda White-King, Tamira C. Sanders, Cindy Mizelle, Kevin Owens – background vocals

== Charts ==
| Chart (1993) | Peak position |
|---|---|
| Australia (ARIA) | 200 |
| Europe (Eurochart Hot 100) | 78 |
| Europe (European Dance Radio) | 3 |
| UK Singles (OCC) | 28 |
| UK Airplay (Music Week) | 24 |
| US Billboard Hot 100 | 62 |
| US Hot R&B/Hip-Hop Songs (Billboard) | 10 |
| US Adult Contemporary (Billboard) | 30 |
| US Cash Box Top 100 | 33 |
