= The Rush =

Single by Luther Vandross

from the album Power of Love
- Released: November 1991
- Recorded: 1990 (album version); September 1991 (video/single version)
- Genre: R&B; soul
- Length: 6:45
- Label: Epic
- Songwriters: Luther Vandross; Marcus Miller
- Producers: Luther Vandross; Marcus Miller

Luther Vandross singles chronology
"Don't Want to Be a Fool" (1991)	"The Rush" (1991)	"Sometimes It's Only Love" (1992)

Music video
- "The Rush" on YouTube

The Rush is a song by American recording R&B artist Luther Vandross', released in November 1991 by Epic Records, as the third single from his seventh album, Power of Love (1991). It was both written and produced by Vandross with Marcus Miller, reaching number six on the US Hot R&B Singles chart, and numbers 64 and 73 on the Cash Box Top 100 and Billboard Hot 100 charts in January 1992. The next single to follow was "Sometimes It's Only Love".

== Critical reception ==
Stephen Thomas Erlewine from AllMusic named the song one of the "high points" of the album. Larry Flick from Billboard magazine wrote, "Vandross is sinfully sweet, slick, and sexy—as always. Urgent, moody R&B tune features upbeat drums that keep the pace rocking, while the melody evokes mystery and passion." A reviewer from Cashbox named it one of the "strongest" songs on the album, describing it as "smooth yet funky". The magazine later stated, "It's Luther, it's a hit! To this date, Luther Vandross has been turning out nothing but hits, and this one is no exception." They added, "You have to give him some credit for changing his musical style on 'The Rush', because this single has a completely different sound compared to his previous productions (and it sounds good). It's needless to write about his vocals because everyone knows about this man's lyrical talent. Just mark down another hit.." Ken Tucker from Entertainment Weekly noted that songs like this "describe the sort of openness, understatement, and spontaneity that have virtually disappeared as pop-music values since the death of Marvin Gaye and Al Green's decision to save his soul for gospel."

== Track listing ==
- US CD single
1. "The Rush" (Morales Radio Mix) — 3:57
2. "The Rush" (Morales 12" Mix) — 7:13
3. "The Rush" (Morales Rush Dub) — 7:10
4. "The Rush" (Vibe Rush Dub) — 5:13

== Personnel ==
- Luther Vandross – vocals
- Marcus Miller – keyboards, synthesizer programming, bass guitar, rhythm arrangement
- Jason Miles – synthesizer sound programming

== Charts ==
=== Weekly charts ===
Chart (1991–1992)	Peak position
Europe (European Dance Radio)	18
UK Singles (Official Charts)	53
UK Dance (Music Week)	29
UK Club Chart (Music Week)	21
US Billboard Hot 100	73
US Hot R&B/Hip-Hop Songs (Billboard)	6
US Cash Box Top 100	64

=== Year-end charts ===
Chart (1992)	Position
US Hot R&B/Hip-Hop Songs (Billboard)	61
