= Sometimes It's Only Love =

Single by Luther Vandross

from the album Power of Love
- Released: April 1992 (US, Europe)
- Recorded: 1991
- Genre: R&B; soul
- Length: 4:54
- Label: Epic
- Songwriter(s): Luther Vandross; Skip Anderson
- Producer(s): Luther Vandross; Marcus Miller

Luther Vandross singles chronology
"The Rush" (1991)	"Sometimes It's Only Love" (1992)	"The Best Things in Life Are Free" (1992)

"Sometimes It's Only Love" is a song by American recording artist Luther Vandross, released in April 1992 by Epic Records as the fourth and final single from his seventh studio album, Power of Love (1991). The song was co-written by Vandross with Skip Anderson and co-produced with Marcus Miller. It became a top ten hit (at No. 9) on the US Billboard Hot R&B Singles and Hot Adult Contemporary Tracks charts.

== Critical reception ==
Stephen Thomas Erlewine from AllMusic named the song one of the "high points" of the album. Larry Flick from Billboard magazine wrote, "This time, Vandross reaffirms his position as a virtually peerless romantic crooner with a lush and soulful ballad. A simply lovely song that will sound wonderful on the radio." People Magazine stated in their review of the Power of Love album, that on the song, "the voice, material and studio technique balance".

== Personnel ==
- Luther Vandross – vocals, vocal arrangement
- John "Skip" Anderson – keyboards, synthesizer programming, rhythm arrangement
- Marcus Miller – additional keyboards, synthesizer programming
- Jason Miles – synthesizer sound programming
- Paulinho da Costa – percussion

== Charts ==
=== Weekly charts ===
Chart (1992)	Peak position
US Adult Contemporary (Billboard)	9
US Hot R&B/Hip-Hop Songs (Billboard)	9

=== Year-end charts ===
Chart (1992)	Position
US Hot R&B/Hip-Hop Songs (Billboard)	87
