= Power of Love (Luther Vandross album) =

Studio album by Luther Vandross
- Released: April 26, 1991
- Recorded: September 1990–January 1991
- Studio: A&M (Hollywood, California); Right Track (New York City, New York); Hit Factory (New York City, New York); The Village (Los Angeles, California)
- Genre: R&B; soul; adult contemporary
- Length: 55:19
- Label: Epic
- Producer: Luther Vandross; Marcus Miller

Luther Vandross chronology
The Best of Luther Vandross... The Best of Love (1989)	Power of Love (1991)	Never Let Me Go (1993)

Singles from Power of Love
- 1. "Power of Love/Love Power" Released: April 9, 1991; 2. "Don't Want to Be a Fool" Released: June 20, 1991; 3. "The Rush" Released: November 1991; 4. "Sometimes It's Only Love" Released: April 1992

Professional ratings
Review scores
Source	Rating
AllMusic	3/5 stars
Calgary Herald	B
Chicago Tribune	3/4 stars
Robert Christgau	(neither)
Entertainment Weekly	A−
Los Angeles Times	3/5 stars
Rolling Stone	4/5 stars

Power of Love is the seventh studio album by American singer-songwriter Luther Vandross, released in North America by Epic on April 26, 1991, following the critical and commercial success of his sixth album Any Love (1988). Power of Love received critical acclaim from most critics, earning Vandross a number of awards and accolades including two American Music Awards and two Grammy Awards. It reached number seven on the US Billboard 200 album chart, while topping the Top R&B Albums chart for five nonconsecutive weeks. On the latter chart, it was Vandross's last number one for twelve years until Dance with My Father was released. The album was later certified double platinum by the RIAA.

== Critical reception ==
Dave Obee from Calgary Herald wrote, "This disc offers more of what we've come to expect: solid R&B vocals, a touch of funk in the guitars and a touch of gospel from supporting singers. A gem is Luther's duet with Martha Wash on the classic "I (Who Have Nothing)" (consider it the definitive version). The title cut is a perfect introduction to an album that's wonderfully seductive. So if you're having trouble getting in the mood - Luther never has, it seems - just slip on this disc and relax. When it ends an hour later, you won't feel the need to put anything else on."

== Track listing ==
No.	Title	Writer(s)	Length
1.	"She Doesn't Mind"	Luther Vandross, Reed Vertelney	4:05
2.	"Power of Love/Love Power"	Vandross, Marcus Miller, Teddy Vann	6:42
3.	"I'm Gonna Start Today"	Vandross, Miller	6:12
4.	"The Rush"	Vandross, Miller	6:45
5.	"I Want the Night to Stay"	Vandross, Nat Adderley, Jr.	5:26
6.	"Don't Want to Be a Fool"	Vandross, Miller	4:34
7.	"I Can Tell You That"	Vandross, Hubert Eaves III	5:25
8.	"Sometimes It's Only Love"	Vandross, Skip Anderson	4:54
9.	"Emotional Love"	Vandross, Eaves	3:53
10.	"I (Who Have Nothing)" (Duet with Martha Wash)	Carlo Donida, Mogol, Jerry Leiber, Mike Stoller	7:26

== Personnel ==
Credits adapted from the album's liner notes.

Production and Technical

- Luther Vandross – producer
- Marcus Miller – producer
- Ray Bardani – engineer, mixing
- Fred Bova – recording
- Brian Cowieson – recording
- Carrie McConkey – recording
- Michael Morongell – recording
- Shelly Yakus – recording
- Martin Brumbach –
- Mark Harder – recording assistant
- Robert Hart – recording assistant
- John Herman – recording assistant
- Rob Jaczko – recording assistant
- Chad Munsey – recording assistant
- Brian Schueble – recording assistant
- Rich Travali – recording assistant
- Dave Collins – digital editing at A&M Studios
- Steve Hall – mastering at Future Disc (Hollywood, California)
- Marsha Burns – production coordinator
- Corsillo/Manzone – design
- Matthew Rolston – photography
- Jeff Jones – hair, make-up
- Hutaff Lennon – personal assistant
- Elijah Reeder – personal assistant
- Alive Enterprises, Inc. – management

Performers and musicians

- Luther Vandross – lead vocals, backing vocals, vocal arrangements (1–3, 5)
- Jason Miles – synthesizer sound programming
- Marcus Miller – keyboards (1–4, 6), synthesizer programming (1–4, 6, 8), rhythm arrangements (1–4, 6), bass guitar (2–4, 6, 10), backing vocals (2), additional keyboards (7–9)
- Reed Vertelney – synthesizer programming (1)
- Nat Adderley, Jr. – acoustic piano (2), keyboards (5, 10), synthesizer programming (5, 10), rhythm and string arrangements (5, 10)
- Hubert Eaves III – keyboards (7, 9), synthesizer programming (7, 9), rhythm arrangements (7, 9)
- John "Skip" Anderson – keyboards (8), synthesizer programming (8), rhythm arrangements (8)
- Paul Jackson, Jr. – guitars (2, 3, 5, 6, 9)
- Paulinho da Costa – wind chimes (2, 6), percussion (5, 8, 10)
- Kirk Whalum – saxophone solo (10)
- Joe Soldo – string contractor (5)
- Alfred Brown – string contractor (10)
- Tawatha Agee – backing vocals (1–3, 5–7)
- Lisa Fischer – backing vocals (1, 2)
- Cissy Houston – backing vocals (1–3, 5–7)
- Darlene Love – backing vocals (1, 2, 9)
- Paulette McWilliams – backing vocals (1–3, 6, 7, 9)
- Fonzi Thornton – backing vocals (1, 2, 5), vocal contractor
- Brenda White King – backing vocals (1–3, 5–7, 9)
- Genobia Jeter – backing vocals (2, 9)
- Pat Joyner – backing vocals (2)
- Kevin Owens – backing vocals (2)
- Tamira C. Sanders – backing vocals (2)
- Cindy Mizelle – backing vocals (5, 6)
- Michelle Cobbs – backing vocals (9)
- Martha Wash – lead vocals (10), backing vocals (10)

== Charts ==
=== Weekly charts ===
Chart (1991)	Peak position
Australian Albums (ARIA)	110
Austrian Albums (Ö3 Austria)	4
UK Albums (OCC)	11
US Billboard 200	7
US Top R&B/Hip-Hop Albums (Billboard)	1

=== Year-end charts ===
Chart (1991)	Position
US Billboard 200	42
US Top R&B/Hip-Hop Albums (Billboard)	9

== Certifications ==
Region	Certification	Certified units/sales
Canada (Music Canada)	Gold	50,000^{^}
United Kingdom (BPI)	Silver	60,000^{^}
United States (RIAA)	2× Platinum	2,000,000^{^}
^{^} Shipments figures based on certification alone.

== See also ==
- List of number-one R&B albums of 1991 (U.S.)
