= Never Let Me Go (Luther Vandross album) =

Studio album by Luther Vandross
- Released: May 26, 1993
- Recorded: October 1992–February 1993
- Studios: A&M Studios (Los Angeles); Right Track (New York City); The Hit Factory (New York City); The Village (Los Angeles)
- Length: 55:28
- Labels: Epic; Legacy
- Producers: Luther Vandross; Marcus Miller

Luther Vandross chronology
Power of Love (1991)	Never Let Me Go (1993)	Songs (1994)

Singles from Never Let Me Go
- 1. "Little Miracles (Happen Every Day)" Released: April 27, 1993; 2. "Heaven Knows" Released: September 7, 1993

Never Let Me Go is the eighth studio album by American R&B/soul singer-songwriter Luther Vandross, released on May 26, 1993, in the US by Epic. It was his first studio album not to peak at #1 on the R&B Albums chart.

The album became the third consecutive top-ten album on the Billboard 200 for Vandross, peaking at number six, and was released to mixed to positive reviews, earning Vandross numerous awards and accolades including three Grammy Award nominations at the 36th Grammy Awards in 1994. Vandross's cover of the Bee Gees hit, "How Deep Is Your Love" was nominated for Best Male R&B Vocal Performance at the 36th Grammy Awards in March 1994. In addition, the album's first two singles "Little Miracles (Happen Every Day)" and "Heaven Knows" received nominations in the Best R&B Song category.

== Critical reception ==
Professional ratings
Review scores
Source	Rating
AllMusic	2/5 stars
Chicago Tribune	3/4 stars
Robert Christgau	(neither)
Entertainment Weekly	B+
Los Angeles Times	3/4 stars
Music Week	4/5 stars
Rolling Stone	2/5 stars

Los Angeles Times critic Dennis Hunt called Never Let Me Go "another classy collection of mostly slow and medium-tempo romantic songs--some gliding along on elegant, light-gospel undercurrent – featuring his high, cooing, sexy vocals [...] The album doesn’t offer much variety, and sometimes Vandross’ brand of lush soul feels mannered. There are no surprises either, but Vandross knows his audience isn't looking for surprises." Entertainment Weekly felt that "Vandross’'albums always come this close to perfection – and Never Let Me Go is no exception. As always, his enunciation is eloquent, his phrasing fierce; and the R&B as smooth as glass. This time Luther stumbles where he usually triumphs, on covers."

AllMusic editor Ron Wynn found that the album "contains more examples of his supple, fluid vocals, expert delivery, and sophisticated yet soulful style [...] Perhaps the only sign of creative wear and tear is the album's structure; there's no real blockbuster single, and the final medley, which blends classics from The Spinners and Bee Gees, sounds thrown together, but these production and arranging elements do not diminish his vocal prowess." Rolling Stone's J.D. Considine wrote that "Never Let Me Go, like most Luther Vandross albums, is a flawless display of technique blessed with exquisite singing, well-crafted arrangements and a mix that has been tweaked to perfection. Unfortunately, the end result is more soporific than soulful — meaning that all Vandross ends up with is the quiet-storm equivalent of elevator music."

== Track listing ==
Never Let Me Go track listing
No.	Title	Writer(s)	Length
1.	"Little Miracles (Happen Every Day)"	Luther Vandross; Marcus Miller	4:43
2.	"Heaven Knows"	Vandross; Reed Vertelney	5:00
3.	"Love Me Again"	Vandross; Miller	6:07
4.	"Can't Be Doin' That Now"	Vandross; Vertelney; Alan Scott	4:47
5.	"Too Far Down"	Vandross; Miller	6:14
6.	"Love Is On the Way (Real Love)"	Vandross; Miller	4:41
7.	"Hustle"	Vandross; Miller	5:45
8.	"Emotion Eyes"	Vandross; Hubert Eaves III	4:56
9.	"Lady, Lady"	Vandross; Miller	5:34
10.	"How Deep Is Your Love/Love Don't Love Nobody (Instrumental interlude medley)"	Robin Gibb; Barry Gibb; Maurice Gibb; Joseph Scott, Jr.; Joseph Jefferson	3:12
11.	"Never Let Me Go" (Johnny Ace cover)	Joseph Scott Jr.	4:29
Total length:			55:28

== Personnel ==
Performers and musicians

- Luther Vandross – lead vocals, vocal arrangements
- Marcus Miller – keyboards (1–7, 9), bass (1–8, 10), drum programming (1, 3, 5, 6, 7, 9), percussion programming (1, 3, 5, 6, 7, 9), music arrangements (1–7, 9), additional drum programming (2, 4), additional keyboards (8, 10), backing vocals (9)
- Jason Miles – sound programming (1–5, 8, 9)
- Philippe Saisse – acoustic piano (2), synthesizer (2), keyboard programming (2)
- Reed Vertelney – keyboard programming (2, 4), drum programming (2, 4), music arrangements (2, 4)
- Eric Persing – sound programming (3, 6, 7, 10)
- Hubert Eaves III – keyboard programming (8), music arrangements (8)
- Nat Adderley, Jr. – keyboards (10), music arrangements (10)
- Paul Jackson, Jr. – guitar
- Doc Powell – guitar (10)
- Ivan Hampden – drum fills (2)
- Michael White – cymbals (3)
- Kirk Whalum – saxophone solo (11)
- Joe Soldo – string contractor (10)
- Tawatha Agee – backing vocals
- Lisa Fischer – backing vocals (1, 3, 5)
- Cissy Houston – backing vocals
- Paulette McWilliams – backing vocals
- Cindy Mizelle – backing vocals (1, 3, 5, 9)
- Kevin Owens – backing vocals (1, 5)
- Tamira C. Sanders – backing vocals (1, 5, 9)
- Fonzi Thornton – backing vocals (1, 2, 3, 5, 6, 7, 9, 10), vocal contractor
- Brenda White-King – backing vocals
- Phillip Ballou – backing vocals (2, 9)
- Michelle Cobbs – backing vocals (2)
- Myrna Smith-Schilling – backing vocals (7, 10)

Technical

- Marcus Miller – producer
- Luther Vandross – producer
- Ray Bardani – engineer, mixing
- Michael Morongell – engineer
- Shelly Yakus – engineer
- Bruce Roberts – recording (6)
- Steve Barncard – assistant engineer
- Bob Borbonus – assistant engineer
- Fred Bova – assistant engineer
- Thom Cadley – assistant engineer
- Jonathan Little – assistant engineer
- Gary Mannon – assistant engineer
- Gary Myerberg – assistant engineer
- Chad Munsey – assistant engineer
- Mark Tindle – assistant engineer
- Dave Collins – mastering at A&M Mastering Studios (Hollywood, California).
- Marsha Burns – production coordinator, manager
- George Corsillo – art direction, design
- Matthew Rolston – photography
- Hutaff Lennon – personal assistant
- Elijah Reeder – personal assistant
- Billy Bass – manager
- Shep Gordon – manager
- Alive Enterprises, Inc. – management company

== Charts ==
=== Weekly charts ===
Weekly chart performance for Never Let Me Go
Chart (1993)	Peak position
Australian Albums (ARIA)	107
Dutch Albums (Album Top 100)	53
UK Albums (Official Charts)	11
US Billboard 200	6
US Top R&B/Hip-Hop Albums (Billboard)	3

=== Year-end charts ===
Year-end chart performance for Never Let Me Go
Chart (1993)	Position
US Billboard 200	98
US Top R&B/Hip-Hop Albums (Billboard)	24

== Certifications ==
Certifications for Never Let Me Go
Region	Certification	Certified units/sales
United States (RIAA)	Platinum	1,000,000^{^}
^{^} Shipments figures based on certification alone.
