= So Amazing (song) =

1983 Dionne Warwick song

Song by Dionne Warwick

from the album How Many Times Can We Say Goodbye
- Recorded: 1983
- Length: 3:43
- Label: Arista
- Songwriters: Luther Vandross; Marcus Miller
- Producer: Luther Vandross

"So Amazing" is a 1983 song recorded by Dionne Warwick. It was written by Luther Vandross and Marcus Miller and produced by Vandross for her studio album How Many Times Can We Say Goodbye (1983). Three years later, Vandross himself covered the song for his fifth studio album Give Me the Reason (1986). Released as a single, it entered the top 40 on the UK Singles Chart and earned a Soul Train Music Award nomination in 1988.

In 2005, singers Stevie Wonder and Beyoncé recorded a duet version of "So Amazing" for the tribute album So Amazing: An All-Star Tribute to Luther Vandross (2005) that was released three months after Vandross' death. Their rendition won the Grammy Award for Best R&B Performance by a Duo or Group with Vocals at the 48th Annual Grammy Awards. The song has since been recorded by several artists, some of which are tributes to Vandross.

== Luther Vandross version ==
"So Amazing"

Single by Luther Vandross

from the album Give Me the Reason
- Released: 1987
- Recorded: 1986
- Genre: Soul
- Length: 3:41
- Label: Epic
- Songwriters: Luther Vandross; Marcus Miller
- Producer: Luther Vandross

Luther Vandross singles chronology
"I Really Didn't Mean It" (1987)	"So Amazing" (1987)	"See Me" (1987)

Warwick and Vandross wanted "So Amazing" to serve as the lead single from Warwick's How Many Times Can We Say Goodbye. However, Arista Records head Clive Davis found that the song lacked commercial crossover appeal and chose the album's title track, a duet by Warwick and Vandross, instead. His decision prompted Vandross to re-record "So Amazing" for his fifth studio album Give Me the Reason (1986). Released as the album's fifth single, his version reached number 33 on the UK Singles Chart and number 94 on the US Hot R&B/Hip-Hop Songs chart. The song was nominated for the Soul Train Music Award for Best R&B/Soul Single – Male at the 1988 awards ceremony. Regarding the success of Vandross' version, Warwick joked in a 2021 interview that she had felt pleasure telling Davis "You can't be right all the time, Sir."

=== Charts ===
Chart (1987)	Peak position
UK Singles (Official Charts)	33
US Hot R&B/Hip-Hop Songs (Billboard)	94

=== Certifications ===
Region	Certification	Certified units/sales
United Kingdom (BPI)	Silver	200,000^{‡}
^{‡} Sales+streaming figures based on certification alone.

== Other cover versions ==
In March 1999, Whitney Houston sang Vandross's "So Amazing" as a tribute to Vandross being honored with the Career Achievement award, as he sat in the audience during the Soul Train Music Awards. Johnny Gill, El DeBarge, and Kenny Lattimore provided background vocals. In 2001, Chante Moore performed the song at the 2001 at the BET Walk of Fame Awards for Vandross. Tamia performed the song at the 2003 Essence Festival on July 5, 2003 in New Orleans, Louisiana. Her performances was taped and aired on the UPN Network on September 12, 2003.

Studio versions

- Gerald Albright on Just Between Us (1987)
- Janet Kay on So Amazing (1988)
- Darwin Hobbs on Vertical (2000)
- Richie Stephens on Covers for Lovers (2003)
- Rigmor Gustafsson with Jacky Terrasson on Close to You (2004)
- Beyoncé and Stevie Wonder on So Amazing: An All-Star Tribute to Luther Vandross (2005)
- Patti Austin on Forever, for Always, for Luther Volume II (2008)
- Marti Pellow on Love to Love (2011)
- Ruben Studdard on Ruben Sings Luther (2018)
