= Forever, for Always, for Luther =

2004 tribute album by various artists

Compilation album by various artists
- Released: July 27, 2004
- Genre: Smooth jazz
- Label: GRP Records
- Producers: Rex Rideout and Bud Harner

Professional ratings
Review scores
Source	Rating
AllMusic	4/5 stars

Forever, for Always, for Luther, released on July 27, 2004, by GRP Records, is a smooth jazz various artists tribute album, with ten popular songs written by Luther Vandross. The album featured vocal arrangements by Luther, and was produced by Rex Rideout and Bud Harner.

Rideout had co-authored songs and contributed arrangements and played keyboards on Luther's final three albums. The tribute album was mixed by Ray Bardani, who recorded and mixed most of Luther's music over the years.

It featured an ensemble of jazz performers, many of whom had previously worked with Luther. The artists on the album were:

- Lalah Hathaway (4), Lisa Fischer (8), Brenda White (8), Cindy Mizelle (8), Fonzi Thornton (8), Ledisi (7) – vocals
- Rex Rideout (1–5, 7–10), Brian Culbertson (6) – keyboards
- Sundra Manning (2, 4) – Hammond organ
- George Benson (9), Ray Fuller (4), Paul Jackson Jr. (1–3, 6, 7), John Pondel (9), Dwight Sills (8, 10), Ty Stevens (5) – guitar
- Alex Al (3, 7, 8) – acoustic and electric bass
- Sekou Bunch (1, 2, 4) – acoustic bass
- Steve Ferrone (5, 10), Michael White (1, 2, 4) – drums
- Lenny Castro (1, 2, 4, 6, 10) – percussion
- Mindi Abair (5), Dave Koz (6) – alto saxophone
- Richard Elliot (8), Boney James (3, 7), Kirk Whalum (1) – tenor saxophone
- Brandon Fields (4, 5) – saxophone
- Lee Thornburg (4, 5, 9) – trumpet
- Rick Braun (10) – trumpet
- Nick Lane (4, 5, 9) – trombone

Several songs from the album received airplay on jazz and R&B stations, but Hathaway's cover of "Forever, for Always, for Love" was the biggest success, becoming a No. 1 Adult R&B hit, reaching the Top 40 on the main R&B chart, and even approaching the Hot 100 (it "bubbled under" at No. 112).

On November 21, 2006, saxophonist Dave Koz released a follow-up to the earlier GRP tribute album, this time a Luther tribute album by various artists on his own Rendezvous Entertainment label, called Forever, for Always, for Luther Volume II, also produced by Rex Rideout and Bud Harner. Dave Koz played on all the follow-up album's tracks, which were recorded by smooth jazz artists Patti Austin, Gerald Albright, Jonathan Butler, Norman Brown, Will Downing, Everette Harp, Jeff Lorber, Maysa, Najee, Wayman Tisdale, Kevin Whalum and Kirk Whalum.

== Track listing ==
1. "Any Love"
2. "Never Too Much"
3. "Wait for Love"
4. "Forever, for Always, for Love"
5. "Stop to Love"
6. "If Only for One Night"
7. "My Sensitivity (Gets in the Way)"
8. "Your Secret Love"
9. "Take You Out"
10. "Dance with My Father”
