= She Won't Talk to Me =

"She Won’t Talk to Me"

Single by Luther Vandross

from the album Any Love
- Released: 1988
- Length: 4:37
- Label: Epic
- Songwriters: Luther Vandross; Hubert Eaves III
- Producers: Luther Vandross; Marcus Miller

Luther Vandross singles chronology
"Any Love" (1988)	"She Won’t Talk to Me" (1988)	"For You to Love" (1989)

"She Won’t Talk to Me" is a song by American recording artist Luther Vandross released in 1988. It is the second single from his album Any Love. The song was a top five U.S. R&B hit, top 20 dance play hit, and a #30 pop hit on Billboard’s Hot 100. Vandross performed the song on the January 28, 1989 episode of Saturday Night Live.

== Personnel ==
- Luther Vandross – lead vocals
- Marcus Miller – keyboard synthesizers, bass, arrangements
- Jason Miles – synthesizer programming
- Paul Jackson Jr. – guitar
- Paulinho da Costa – percussion
- Buddy Williams – drum overdubs
- Cissy Houston, Lisa Fischer, Paulette McWilliams, Tawatha Agee, Brenda White, Michael Lovesmith, Fonzi Thornton, Kevin Owens, Mark Stevens – background vocals
- Hubert Eaves III – arrangements

== Charts ==
Chart (1988–89)	Peak position
UK Singles (OCC)	34
US Billboard Hot 100	30
US Hot R&B/Hip-Hop Songs (Billboard)	3
US Adult Contemporary (Billboard)	17
US Dance Club Songs (Billboard)	18
