= For You to Love =

Single by Luther Vandross

from the album Any Love
- Released: 1989 (U.S., Europe)
- Genre: R&B, soul
- Length: 5:39
- Label: Epic Records
- Songwriter(s): Luther Vandross, M. Miller
- Producer(s): Luther Vandross, Marcus Miller

Luther Vandross singles chronology
"She Won't Talk to Me" (1988)	"For You to Love" (1989)	"Here and Now" (1989)

"For You to Love" is a 1988 song by the American recording artist Luther Vandross. The single was released in 1989 in support of his hit album Any Love. The song was a top five U.S. R&B hit that peaked to No. 3 on the R&B singles. Vandross' Any Love album charted three top-five singles on the Billboard Hot R&B Singles chart.

== Personnel ==
- Luther Vandross – lead and background vocals
- Marcus Miller – keyboard synthesizers, bass, arrangements
- Jason Miles – synthesizer programming
- Paul Jackson Jr. – guitar
- Paulinho da Costa – percussion
- Buddy Williams – drum overdubs
- Nat Adderley Jr. – string arrangement

== Charts ==
Chart (1989)	Peak position
US Billboard Hot R&B Singles	3
