= Always & Forever: The Classics =

Greatest hits album by Luther Vandross
- Released: September 22, 1998 (US)
- Genre: R&B, soul
- Label: LV, Epic
- Producer: Luther Vandross (also executive), Nat Adderley Jr., Walter Afanasieff, Marcus Miller, Frank Ceraolo (compilation producer)

Luther Vandross chronology
I Know (1998)	Always & Forever: The Classics (1998)	Greatest Hits (1999)

Professional ratings
Review scores
Source	Rating
Allmusic	4/5 stars

Always & Forever: The Classics is a greatest hits album by American R&B/soul singer Luther Vandross, released in 1998 (see 1998 in music). It contains Luther's best known cover songs.

== Track listing ==
1. "A House Is Not a Home" – 7:08
2. "Since I Lost My Baby" – 5:25
3. "Superstar/Until You Come Back to Me (That's What I'm Gonna Do)" – 9:18
4. "Creepin'" – 4:04
5. "Anyone Who Had a Heart" – 5:46
6. "I (Who Have Nothing)" (with Martha Wash) – 7:28
7. "If This World Were Mine" (with Cheryl Lynn) – 5:24
8. "Goin' Out of My Head" – 5:17
9. "Going in Circles" – 5:12
10. "Knocks Me off My Feet" – 3:45
11. "Love Won't Let Me Wait" – 7:20
12. "Always and Forever" – 4:56

== Charts ==
Chart (1998)	Peak position
US Top R&B/Hip-Hop Albums (Billboard)	85
