= Forever, for Always, for Love =

- Cover art by Lynn Goldsmith

Studio album by Luther Vandross
- Released: September 21, 1982
- Recorded: February–June 1982
- Studio: Mediasound Studios (New York City, New York) Record Plant (Los Angeles, California) The Village Recorder (Los Angeles, California)
- Genre: R&B, soul
- Length: 43:32
- Label: Epic
- Producer: Luther Vandross

Luther Vandross chronology
Never Too Much (1981)	Forever, for Always, for Love (1982)	Busy Body (1983)

Singles from Forever, for Always, for Love
- 1. "Bad Boy/Having a Party" Released: August 1982; 2. "Since I Lost My Baby" Released: February 1983

Professional ratings
Review scores
Source	Rating
AllMusic	4/5 stars
Chicago Tribune	3/4 stars
Robert Christgau	B+
Rolling Stone	4/5 stars
The Rolling Stone Album Guide	3/5 stars

Forever, for Always, for Love is the second studio album by American R&B/soul singer-songwriter Luther Vandross, released on September 21, 1982, by Epic Records. It became Vandross' second album to chart in the top 20 on the Billboard 200 and was his second album to top the R&B Albums chart where it spent three weeks.

The album was certified Platinum by the RIAA, and earned Vandross his third nomination for Best R&B Vocal Performance, Male, but lost to Marvin Gaye for his song "Sexual Healing".

The hit "Since I Lost My Baby" was originally recorded by the Temptations in 1965, while the "Having a Party" part of the opening track was originally recorded by Sam Cooke in 1962. The album's opening track was heard during the opening credits of the 1990 film House Party. Rolling Stone gave the album a four-star rating, describing Vandross as "the most gifted male pop-soul singer of his generation".

In 2004, singer Lalah Hathaway covered the song "Forever, for Always, for Love" for the compilation album Forever, for Always, for Luther. She later included the song on her 2004 third album Outrun the Sky. In the same year Philadelphia rap-duo Young Gunz sampled "Better Love" on their top 40 hit "No Better Love" ft. Rell.

== Track listing ==
Side one
No.	Title	Writer(s)	Length
1.	"Bad Boy/Having a Party"	Luther Vandross, Marcus Miller, Sam Cooke	5:16
2.	"You're the Sweetest One"	Vandross, Miller	4:46
3.	"Since I Lost My Baby"	Smokey Robinson, Warren Moore	5:28
4.	"Forever, for Always, for Love"	Vandross	6:23

Side two
No.	Title	Writer(s)	Length
5.	"Better Love"	Vandross, Nat Adderley, Jr.	6:26
6.	"Promise Me"	Vandross	4:43
7.	"She Loves Me Back"	Vandross	6:09
8.	"Once You Know How"	Vandross	4:35

== Personnel ==
- Luther Vandross – vocals, vocal arrangements (1–3, 5–8), arrangements (1, 4), rhythm arrangements (3, 5–8), backing vocals (3, 6–8), acoustic piano (8)
- Nat Adderley, Jr. – keyboards (1–7), rhythm arrangements (3, 5–7), arrangements (4), electric piano (8)
- Ed Walsh – synthesizers (1)
- Doc Powell – guitars
- Georg Wadenius – guitars (2, 5)
- Marcus Miller – bass, arrangements (1), rhythm arrangements (2), backing vocals (7)
- Yogi Horton – drums (1–3, 5–7)
- Buddy Williams – drums (4, 8)
- Ralph MacDonald – percussion (1, 2)
- Paulinho da Costa – percussion (3, 5–7)
- Sammy Figueroa – percussion (3, 5)
- Lawrence Feldman – flute solo (4)
- Tawatha Agee – backing vocals (2, 3, 5, 8)
- Michelle Cobbs – backing vocals (2, 5, 7, 8)
- Cissy Houston – backing vocals (2, 3, 5)
- Yvonne Lewis – backing vocals (2, 5)
- Brenda White – backing vocals (2, 3, 5, 8)
- Phillip Ballou – backing vocals (3, 5, 8)
- Paulette McWilliams – backing vocals (3)
- Fonzi Thornton – backing vocals (3, 5, 7, 8)
- Norma Jean Wright – backing vocals (3, 8)

Horns and Strings (Tracks 2–8)

- Paul Riser – horn and string arrangements (2–5)
- Leon Pendarvis – horn and string arrangements (6–8)
- Sephra Herman – musical contractor
- Steve Prisby and Albert Schoonmaker – music copyists
- Dave Bargeron, Michael Brecker, Randy Brecker, Jon Clarke, Ronnie Cuber, Jon Faddis, Lawrence Feldman, Peter Gordon, Tom Malone, Lou Marini, Alan Rubin, Dave Taylor and Gregory Williams – horns
- Jonathan Abramowitz, Lewis Bagowitz, Julien Barber, John Beal, Gene Bianco, Alfred Brown, Frederick Buldrini, Ron Carter, Lewis Eley, Judy Geist, Leo Kahn, Sidney Kaufman, Jesse Levy, Guy Lumia, Homer Mensch, Louann Montesi, Kermit Moore, Max Pollikoff, Sue Pray, Margaret Ross, Ora Shiran, Richard Sortomme, Emanuel Vardi, Helen Weiss, Marilyn Wright and Harry Zaratzian – strings

Background party people on "Bad Boy/Having a Party"

- Nat Adderley, Jr., Phillip Ballou, Paulette McWilliams, Fonzi Thornton, Luther Vandross and Brenda White

"I love you back" voices on "She Loves Me Back"

- Tawatha Agee, Brenda White, Cissy Houston, Yvonne Lewis and Michelle Cobbs

== Production ==
- Larkin Arnold – executive producer
- Luther Vandross – producer
- Michael H. Brauer – recording, mixing
- Karat Faye – assistant engineer
- Andy Hoffman – assistant engineer
- Robin Laine – assistant engineer
- Scott Mabuchi – assistant engineer
- Harry Spiridakis – assistant engineer
- Greg Calbi – mastering at Sterling Sound (New York, NY)
- Sephra Herman – production coordinator
- John Berg – design
- Peter A. Alferi – design
- Bill King – photography
- Hutaff Lennon Jr. – wardrobe design
- Alive Enterprises, Inc. – management

== Reception ==
In The Boston Phoenix, Marjorie Karp Spencer wrote that "the new record is precise, spiffy, and taunting: a shade too busy to be coldly clean, a little too punchy for the moneyed gleam of its surface. But Vandross is straightforward about fidelity, capturing some high-hat on the reproachful ballad 'Better Love' that’s metallic enough to rattle the silver in my molars."

== Charts ==
=== Weekly charts ===
Chart (1982)	Peak position
US Billboard 200	20
US Top R&B/Hip-Hop Albums (Billboard)	1
Chart (1987)	Peak position
UK Albums (OCC)	23

=== Year-end charts ===
Chart (1983)	Position
US Billboard 200	53
US Top R&B/Hip-Hop Albums (Billboard)	7

== Certifications ==
Region	Certification	Certified units/sales
United Kingdom (BPI)	Silver	60,000^{^}
United States (RIAA)	Platinum	1,000,000^{^}
^{^} Shipments figures based on certification alone.

== See also ==
- List of number-one R&B albums of 1982 (U.S.)
