= Don't Want to Be a Fool =

Single by Luther Vandross

from the album Power of Love
- Released: June 20, 1991
- Recorded: 1991
- Genre: R&B; soul
- Length: 4:35
- Label: Epic
- Songwriters: Luther Vandross; Marcus Miller
- Producers: Luther Vandross; Marcus Miller

Luther Vandross singles chronology
"Power of Love/Love Power" (1991)	"Don't Want to Be a Fool" (1991)	"The Rush" (1991)

Music video
- "Don't Want to Be a Fool" on YouTube

"Don't Want to Be a Fool" is a song by American recording artist Luther Vandross, released in June 1991 by Epic Records, as the second single from his seventh album, Power of Love (1991). The song was both written and produced by Vandross with Marcus Miller. It peaked at No. 4 on the US Billboard Hot R&B Singles chart on September 14 and also peaked at No. 9 on the Billboard Hot 100 on November 2 same year, as well as No. 19 on the US Cash Box Top 100.

== Critical reception ==
Stephen Thomas Erlewine from AllMusic named the song one of the "high points" of the album. Larry Flick from Billboard magazine wrote, "Second single from Vandross' current Power of Love disc places the acclaimed vocalist in a familiar R&B ballad setting. Lovely tune has already begun making radio and chart inroads, and should have no trouble matching the success of its predecessor." Henderson and DeVaney from Cashbox described it as "a smooth, mid-tempo "up-town soul" song oozing with emotion."

== Track listing ==
- US cassette single, CD single
1. "Don't Want to Be a Fool" — 4:35

== Personnel ==
- Luther Vandross – lead vocals, background vocals, vocal arrangement
- Marcus Miller – keyboards, synthesizer programming, bass guitar, rhythm arrangement
- Jason Miles – synthesizer sound programming
- Paul Jackson Jr. – guitar
- Paulinho da Costa – percussion
- Cissy Houston, Cindy Mizelle, Paulette McWilliams, Brenda White-King, Tawatha Agee – background vocals

== Charts ==
Chart (1991)	Peak position
UK Singles (OCC)	84
UK Airplay (Music Week)	46
US Billboard Hot 100	9
US Adult Contemporary (Billboard)	5
US Hot R&B Singles (Billboard)	4
US Cash Box Top 100	19
