= Heaven Knows (Luther Vandross song) =

Single by Luther Vandross

from the album Never Let Me Go
- Released: September 7, 1993 (US, Europe)
- Recorded: October 1992–February 1993
- Genre: R&B
- Length: 4:26
- Label: Epic; Sony
- Songwriters: Luther Vandross; Reed Vertelney
- Producer: Marcus Miller

Luther Vandross singles chronology
"Little Miracles (Happen Every Day)" (1993)	"Heaven Knows" (1993)	"Never Let Me Go" (1993)

Music video
- "Heaven Knows" on YouTube

"Heaven Knows" is a song by American singer-songwriter Luther Vandross, released in September 1993 by Epic and Sony as the second single from his eight studio album, Never Let Me Go (1993). The song was written by Vandross with Reed Vertelney and produced by Marcus Miller. It peaked in the top 30 on both the US Billboard Hot R&B Singles and Hot Dance Club Play charts, and also at thirty-three on the Billboard Hot Adult Contemporary Singles chart. "Heaven Knows" was nominated for Best R&B Song alongside "Little Miracles (Happen Every Day)" (also from Never Let Me Go) at the 36th Annual Grammy Awards in March 1994, losing to "That's the Way Love Goes" by Janet Jackson.

== Critical reception ==
Larry Flick from Billboard magazine wrote, "Familiar-sounding midtempo jam from Vandross' current Never Let Me Go collection shows the singer in fine form. Lovely melody and a memorable chorus are laid into retro rhythm that will work best with older audiences. Broader acceptance will come via sparkling dance remixes by Frankie Knuckles and David Morales." In his weekly UK chart commentary, James Masterton stated, "One of the few soul artists in the traditional sense to still be having UK hits is Luther Vandross." Andy Beevers from Music Week gave it a score of four out of five, naming it "one of the best tracks" of the album. He also complimented the Classic mix, that "is going to sound great on the radio". James Hamilton from the Record Mirror Dance Update described "Heaven Knows" as "creamily flowing" in his weekly dance column.

== Music video ==
A music video was produced to promote the single. It features NewsRadio actress Khandi Alexander appearing as one of the backup dancers. The video was later made available on Vandross' official YouTube channel in 2010.

== Track listing ==
- UK CD single
1. "Heaven Knows" (Single Version) - 4:26
2. "Heaven Knows" (Classic 12" Mix) - 8:00
3. "I Want the Night to Stay" - 5:26

== Personnel ==
- Luther Vandross – lead vocals, vocal arrangement
- Marcus Miller – bass, keyboards, additional drum programming, music arrangement
- Reed Vertelney – keyboard and drum programming, music arrangement
- Ivan Hampden Jr. – drum fills
- Paul Jackson Jr. – guitar
- Philippe Saisse – piano, synth, and keyboard programming
- Cissy Houston, Fonzi Thornton, Paulette McWilliams, Tawatha Agee, Brenda White-King, Michelle Cobbs, Phillip Ballou – background vocals

== Charts ==
Chart (1993)	Peak position
Australia (ARIA)	174
Europe (European Dance Radio)	7
Germany (GfK)	69
UK Singles (OCC)	34
UK Airplay (Music Week)	24
UK Dance (Music Week)	5
UK Club Chart (Music Week)	7
US Billboard Hot 100	94
US Adult Contemporary (Billboard)	33
US Hot Dance Club Play (Billboard)	15
US Hot R&B/Hip-Hop Songs (Billboard)	24
US Maxi-Singles Sales (Billboard)	39
US Cash Box Top 100	73
