= Don't You Know That? =

- Side-A label of the U.S. vinyl single

Single by Luther Vandross

from the album Never Too Much
- B-side: "I've Been Working"
- Released: December 1981 (U.S.)
- Genre: R&B, quiet storm
- Length: 4:01
- Label: Epic
- Songwriter: Luther Vandross
- Producers: Luther Vandross, Larkin Arnold

Luther Vandross singles chronology
"Never Too Much" (1981)	"Don't You Know That?" (1981)	"If This World Were Mine" (1982)

"Don't You Know That?" is a song by American recording artist Luther Vandross. The song was released as the second single in support of the album Never Too Much.

The single followed Vandross's number 1 R&B hit, "Never Too Much". In January 1982, Vandross scored his second top ten R&B hit when "Don't You Know That?” peaked at No. 10 on the Billboard Hot R&B Singles.

== Personnel ==
- Luther Vandross – lead and background vocals, rhythm arrangement
- Nathaniel Adderley Jr. – keyboards, rhythm arrangement
- Buddy Williams – drums
- Marcus Miller – bass
- Steve Love, Georg Wadenius – guitar
- Billy King – congas
- Paul Riser – string arrangement
- Tawatha Agee, Phillip Ballou – background vocals

== Charts ==
Chart (1982)	Peak position
US Billboard Hot R&B Singles	10
