= Power of Love/Love Power =

Single by Luther Vandross

from the album Power of Love
- Released: April 9, 1991
- Recorded: 1991; A&M Studios (Hollywood, CA); Right Track Recording (New York, NY)
- Genre: R&B; soul; gospel
- Length: 6:42
- Label: Epic
- Songwriters: Luther Vandross; Marcus Miller; Teddy Vann
- Producers: Luther Vandross; Marcus Miller

Luther Vandross singles chronology
"Treat You Right" (1990)	"Power of Love/Love Power" (1991)	"Don't Want to Be a Fool" (1991)

Music video
- "Power of Love/Love Power" on YouTube

"Power of Love/Love Power" is a song by American singer-songwriter Luther Vandross, released on April 9, 1991 by Epic Records as the lead single from his 1991 album of the same name. The song spent two weeks at number one on the US R&B chart, and peaked at number four on the US pop chart, becoming his biggest pop solo hit.

The song is a medley of the songs "Power of Love," written by Vandross and Marcus Miller, and "Love Power," a minor hit in 1968 for the one-hit wonder R&B group The Sandpebbles. The Sandpebbles version of "Love Power" had made it number 22 on the Billboard Hot 100, and number 14 on the R&B singles chart.

In 1995, the song was re-recorded for the compilation Greatest Hits 1981–1995. It was released as a single with remixes by Frankie Knuckles and Uno Clio.

American singer Donna Summer recorded a version of the song for the 2005 album So Amazing: An All-Star Tribute to Luther Vandross.

== Critical reception ==
Stephen Thomas Erlewine from AllMusic named the song one of the "high points" of the album. Larry Flick from Billboard magazine deemed it "a tasty blend of influences: pleasing pop melodies, funky guitars, gospel-tinged backing vocals, and (naturally) effective R&B vocals. Thoroughly satisfying." Ken Tucker from Entertainment Weekly said it is "as paradoxically playful and ambitious as its title." He added, "Here is a perfect example of the way pop improvisation can combine with technical precision to revitalize verbal clichés. In this case, Vandross has joined two different songs, both featuring gliding, colliding melodies that offer the singer an opportunity to apply his delicate tenor to witty, chanted variations on the songs' titles."

James Hamilton from Record Mirror noted its "gentle swingbeat jiggle", naming it a "pleasant 0-92.2bpm smoochy swayer". After the song was remixed in 1995, British magazine Music Week gave it a score of four out of five and named it Single of the Week, writing, "Not typical Luther, but sumptuous all the same. This upbeat groover, taken from the soul meister's new greatest hits album, has all the ingredients of a chart hit." Music Week editor Alan Jones commented, "The underlying melodic strength is surrendered to the rhythm, which takes the form of a brisk house beat. Vandross is a singer of great finesse and exercises like this do him no favours."

== Track listings ==
- US CD/12" remix single (12" Power Mixes)
1. "Power of Love/Love Power" (Powerful Mix) — 7:55
2. "Power of Love/Love Power" (Radio Edit) — 5:20
3. "Power of Love/Love Power" (Love Dub) — 5:54
- 12" vinyl single
1. "Power of Love/Love Power" — 4:15
2. "I Wanted Your Love" — 5:38
3. "Any Love" — 4:59
- 7" vinyl single
1. "Power of Love/Love Power" — 4:15
2. "Power of Love/Love Power" (Instrumental) — 6:43
- 12" vinyl Austria single (1995)
1. "Power of Love/Love Power" (The Absolutely Fabulous Club Mix) — 10:27
2. "Power of Love/Love Power" (The Franktified Mix) — 6:40
3. "Power of Love/Love Power" (Uno Clio Main Vocal Remix) — 7:50
4. "Power of Love/Love Power" (Colin Peter & Carl Ward 12" Remix) — 6:06
5. "Power of Love/Love Power" (The Classic Instrumental) — 6:51
- US, UK, CD maxi single (1995)
1. "Power of Love/Love Power" (The Frankie Knuckles Radio Remix) — 4:15
2. "Power of Love/Love Power" (Original Version - Radio Edit) — 4:15
3. "Power of Love/Love Power" (Uno Clio 7" Vocal Remix) — 4:18
4. "Power of Love/Love Power" (Colin Peter & Carl Ward 7" Vocal) — 4:25
5. "Power of Love/Love Power" (The Dance Radio Mix) — 6:28
6. "Power of Love/Love Power" (The Absolutely Fabulous Club Mix) — 10:27
7. "Power of Love/Love Power" (The Power Reprise) — 3:37

== Personnel ==
- Luther Vandross – lead vocals, vocal arrangement
- Marcus Miller – keyboards, synthesizer programming, bass guitar, background vocals, rhythm arrangement
- Nat Adderley Jr. – piano
- Jason Miles – synthesizer sound programming
- Paul Jackson Jr. – guitar
- Paulinho da Costa – windchimes
- Cissy Houston, Fonzi Thornton, Darlene Love, Paulette McWilliams, Lisa Fischer, Tawatha Agee, Brenda White-King, Pat Joyner, Tamira C. Sanders, Genobia Jeter, Kevin Owens – background vocals

== Charts ==
=== Weekly charts ===
Chart (1991)	Peak position
Australia (ARIA)	109
Europe (European Hit Radio)	24
UK Singles (Official Charts)	46
UK Airplay (Music Week)	20
UK Dance (Music Week)	18
UK Club Chart (Record Mirror)	65
US Billboard Hot 100	4
US Adult Contemporary (Billboard)	3
US Hot R&B/Hip-Hop Songs (Billboard)	1
US Cash Box Top 100	6

=== Year-end charts ===
Chart (1991)	Position
Canada Top Singles (RPM)	73
US Billboard Hot 100	47
US Adult Contemporary (Billboard)	20
US Hot R&B/Hip-Hop Songs (Billboard)	34

== See also ==
- List of number-one R&B singles of 1991 (U.S.)
