= Here and Now (Luther Vandross song) =

Single by Luther Vandross

from the album The Best of Luther Vandross... The Best of Love
- B-side: "Come Back"
- Released: September 1989
- Recorded: 1989
- Genre: R&B, soul, adult contemporary
- Length: 5:20
- Label: Epic
- Songwriters: David L. Elliott, Terry Steele
- Producers: Luther Vandross, Marcus Miller

Luther Vandross singles chronology
"For You to Love" (1989)	"Here and Now" (1989)	"Treat You Right" (1990)

Music video
- "Here and Now" on YouTube

"Here and Now" is a 1989 song by American recording artist Luther Vandross, written by David L. Elliott and Terry Steele. The single is from the compilation album The Best of Luther Vandross... The Best of Love. "Here and Now" became Vandross' fifth single to peak at No. 1 on the Hot Black Singles, and his first single to chart in the top ten on the Billboard Hot 100, peaking at No. 6.

== Critical reception ==
David Giles from Music Week wrote, "Vandross diehards will happily lap this up — it's already put in a showing in the lower reaches of the chart — but this typically dreamy, sensual ballad hardly represents a quantum leap in style for the romantic soul maestro."

== Accolades ==
"Here and Now" won Vandross his first Grammy Award at the 33rd Annual Grammy Awards in February 1991 for Best Male R&B Vocal Performance. Vandross had been nominated for a Grammy nine times going back to 1982. Upon hearing his name being announced as the winner, a happy and relieved Vandross stood up as did the audience, who gave the singer a standing ovation. Upon him accepting the award at the podium, Vandross resung the words "your love is all I need" from the song's chorus, generating more cheers from the audience.

== Popular culture ==
- Vandross performed the song on an episode of The Oprah Winfrey Show
- Vandross also performed the song in the two-part "Do Not Pass Go" (season 5) of 227, where he performed during Rose and Warren's wedding ceremony in early 1990.

== Renditions ==
- American singer Patti LaBelle recorded a version of the song for the 2005 album So Amazing: An All-Star Tribute to Luther Vandross.
- In 1997, saxophonist Richard Elliot covered the song on the soprano saxophone for his album "Jumpin' Off."

== Personnel ==
- Luther Vandross – lead vocals, producer
- Nat Adderley Jr. – keyboards, synthesizers, string arrangements
- Jason Miles – synthesizer programming
- Paul Jackson Jr., Doc Powell – guitar
- Paulinho da Costa – percussion
- Ivan Hampden Jr. – drum overdubs
- Cissy Houston, Tawatha Agee, Brenda White, Lisa Fischer, Fonzi Thornton, Paulette McWilliams – background vocals
- Joseph Soldo – string contractor
- Marcus Miller – producer
- Ray Bardani – engineer, mixing

== Charts ==
=== Weekly charts ===
Chart (1989–1990)	Peak position
Europe (Eurochart Hot 100)	100
UK Singles (OCC)	43
US Billboard Hot 100	6
US Adult Contemporary (Billboard)	3
US Hot R&B/Hip-Hop Songs (Billboard)	1
US Cash Box Top 100	7

=== Year-end charts ===
Chart (1990)	Position
US Billboard Hot 100	43
US Hot R&B/Hip-Hop Songs (Billboard)	36
US Cash Box Top 100	18

== Certifications ==
Region	Certification	Certified units/sales
United States (RIAA)	Platinum	1,000,000^{‡}
^{‡} Sales+streaming figures based on certification alone.
