= Bad Boy/Having a Party =

Single by Luther Vandross

from the album Forever, for Always, for Love
- Released: August 1982
- Studio: Mediasound, New York City
- Genre: R&B, soul
- Length: 5:16
- Label: Epic Records
- Songwriters: Luther Vandross, Marcus Miller, Sam Cooke
- Producers: Luther Vandross, Marcus Miller

Luther Vandross singles chronology
"If This World Were Mine" (1982)	""Bad Boy" / "Having a Party"" (1982)	"Since I Lost My Baby" (1983)

"Bad Boy/Having a Party" is a song by American recording artist Luther Vandross in 1982. The song was released as the first single in support of his album Forever, for Always, for Love. The single became a top five R&B hit which peaked to number-three on the Hot R&B Singles chart, and reached #55 on the Billboard Hot 100. The song was featured during the opening credits of the 1990 film House Party and was in the 2022 Whitney Houston biopic I Wanna Dance with Somebody. The bridge samples the chorus from the Sam Cooke song "Having a Party," but with new lyrics added to the end ("you can't go").

== Personnel ==
- Luther Vandross – lead and background vocals, arrangements, vocal arrangements
- Nat Adderley Jr. – keyboards, background vocals
- Marcus Miller – bass, arrangements
- Yogi Horton – drums
- Doc Powell, Georg Wadenius – guitar
- Ralph MacDonald – percussion
- Ed Walsh – synthesizer
- Brenda White, Paulette McWilliams, Fonzi Thornton, Phillip Ballou – background vocals

== Charts ==
Chart (1982)	Peak position
US Billboard Hot 100	55
US Billboard Hot R&B Singles	3
