= Give Me the Reason (Luther Vandross album) =

Studio album by Luther Vandross
- Released: September 26, 1986
- Recorded: June 1985–June 1986
- Studio: AIR (Salem, Montserrat); Minot Sound (White Plains, New York); Westlake Studios (West Hollywood, California)
- Genre: R&B; soul; pop
- Length: 46:18
- Label: Epic
- Producer: Luther Vandross; Marcus Miller

Luther Vandross chronology
The Night I Fell in Love (1985)	Give Me the Reason (1986)	Any Love (1988)

Singles from Give Me the Reason
- 1. "Stop to Love" Released: August 1986; 2. "Give Me the Reason" Released: November 1986; 3. "I Really Didn't Mean It" Released: April 1987; 4. "There's Nothing Better Than Love" Released: June 1987; 5. "So Amazing" Released: September 1987

Professional ratings
Review scores
Source	Rating
AllMusic	3/5 stars
Chicago Tribune	3/4 stars
Robert Christgau	B
Los Angeles Times	(average)
Rolling Stone	(mixed)
The Rolling Stone Album Guide	4/5 stars

"Stop to Love"
Luther Vandross' "Stop to Love" from Give Me the Reason

Give Me the Reason is the fifth studio album by American R&B/soul singer-songwriter Luther Vandross, released on September 26, 1986, by Epic Records. The album earned Vandross an American Music Award for Favorite Soul/R&B Male Artist and a nomination for "Favorite Soul/R&B Album" in 1988, while the title track was nominated for Best R&B Song and Best R&B Vocal Performance, Male at the 29th Grammy Awards.

The album also includes Vandross' first Billboard top-20 pop hit, "Stop to Love." It also marked a svelte, thinner Vandross due to a weight loss earlier in the year. The album went on to sell over 2 million copies in the United States and was certified double platinum by the Recording Industry Association of America (RIAA). In addition to the title track and "Stop to Love," the album features three other hit singles: "So Amazing", "There's Nothing Better Than Love" (duet with Gregory Hines), and "I Really Didn't Mean It."

== Track listing ==
No.	Title	Writer(s)	Length
1.	"Stop to Love"	Luther Vandross, Nat Adderley, Jr.	5:19
2.	"See Me"	Vandross, Marcus Miller	5:29
3.	"I Gave It Up (When I Fell in Love)"	Vandross, Miller	4:45
4.	"So Amazing"	Vandross	3:41
5.	"Give Me the Reason" (from the soundtrack Ruthless People)	Vandross, Adderley	4:45
6.	"There's Nothing Better Than Love" (Duet with Gregory Hines)	Vandross, Skip Anderson	4:42
7.	"I Really Didn't Mean It"	Vandross, Miller	5:43
8.	"Because It's Really Love"	Vandross	6:13
9.	"Anyone Who Had a Heart"	Burt Bacharach, Hal David	5:45

== Personnel ==
- Luther Vandross – vocals, backing vocals, vocal arrangements
- Nat Adderley, Jr. – keyboards, synthesizers, string arrangements, rhythm and synthesizer arrangements (1, 4–6, 8, 9), horn and string arrangements (4)
- Marcus Miller – synthesizers, bass guitar, rhythm and synthesizer arrangements (2, 3, 7), backing vocals
- Jason Miles – synthesizer programming
- Paul Jackson, Jr. and Doc Powell – guitars (all tracks except 7)
- Ira Siegel – guitars (7)
- Yogi Horton – drums
- Paulinho da Costa – congas, percussion
- Kirk Whalum – saxophone solo (3, 9)
- Paul Riser – horn and string arrangements (4)
- John "Skip Anderson – rhythm arrangements (6)
- David Lasley – backing vocals, vocal contractor
- Kevin Owens – backing vocals
- Fonzi Thornton – backing vocals, vocal contractor
- Ava Cherry – alto vocals
- Charlotte Crossley – alto vocals
- Michelle Cobbs – alto vocals
- Paulette McWilliams – alto vocals, vocal contractor
- Alfa Anderson – soprano vocals
- Lisa Fischer – soprano vocals
- Cissy Houston – soprano vocals
- Cheryl Lynn – soprano vocals
- Myrna Smith-Schilling – soprano vocals
- Gregory Hines – vocals (6)

=== Production ===
- Larkin Arnold – executive producer
- Marcus Miller – producer (1–4, 6–9)
- Luther Vandross – producer
- Ray Bardani – engineer, mixing
- Iris Cohen – recording assistant
- Craig Johnson – recording assistant
- Carl Lever – recording assistant
- Wayne Warnecke – recording assistant
- Bruce Wildstein – recording assistant
- Paul Dwyer – technical maintenance
- Rich Markowitz – technical maintenance
- Paul Rushbrooke – technical maintenance
- Bruce Robbins – technical maintenance
- Greg Calbi – mastering at Sterling Sound (New York, NY)
- Thomas Cimillo – studio manager (Minot Sound)
- Yvonne Kelly – studio manager (AIR Studios)
- Debbie Jenkins – studio manager (Westlake Studios)
- Marsha Burns – production coordinator
- George Corsillo – art direction, design
- Matthew Rolston – photography
- Elijah Reeder – personal assistant
- James Taylor – hair stylist
- Jeff Jones – make-up
- Shep Gordon and Daniel S. Markus at Alive Enterprises, Inc. – management

== Charts and certifications ==
=== Weekly charts ===
Chart (1987–88)	Peak position
UK Albums (OCC)	3
US Billboard 200	14
US Top R&B/Hip-Hop Albums (Billboard)	1

=== Year-end charts ===
Chart (1987)	Peak position
US Top R&B/Hip-Hop Albums (Billboard)	2

=== Certifications ===
Region	Certification	Certified units/sales
United Kingdom (BPI)	2× Platinum	600,000^{^}
United States (RIAA)	2× Platinum	2,000,000^{^}
^{^} Shipments figures based on certification alone.
