= Forever, for Always, for Luther Volume II =

Compilation album by various artists
- Released: (United States) November 21, 2006
- Genre: smooth jazz
- Label: Rendezvous Entertainment
- Producer: Rex Rideout and Bud Harner

Forever, for Always, for Luther Volume II, released on November 21, 2006 by Rendezvous Entertainment, is a smooth jazz various artists tribute album, with ten popular songs written by Luther Vandross. The album was produced by Rex Rideout and Bud Harner, as a follow-up to their earlier GRP Records tribute album, Forever, For Always, For Luther.

Rideout had co-authored songs and contributed arrangements and played keyboards on Luther's final three albums.

Saxophonist Dave Koz, who had performed on the first album, and who had founded Rendezvous Entertainment a few years earlier, released the 2006 follow-up on his own Rendezvous label. Dave Koz played on all the featured Luther Vandross tracks, which were recorded by various smooth jazz artists.

Professional ratings
Review scores
Source	Rating
Allmusic	link

== Track listing ==
1. Give Me the Reason, Kirk Whalum, 4:03
2. 'Til My Baby Comes Home, Norman Brown and Everette Harp, 5:29
3. There's Nothing Better Than Love, Maysa and Kevin Whalum, 5:53
4. For You to Love, Jeff Lorber, 5:20
5. If This World Were Mine, Gerald Albright, 5:15
6. The Glow of Love, Wayman Tisdale, 4:03
7. So Amazing, Patti Austin, 4:26
8. The Night I Fell in Love, Najee, 4:39
9. I Don't Want to Be a Fool, Jonathan Butler, 5:06
10. Superstar, Will Downing, 5:48
