= Give Me the Reason (song) =

1986 single by Luther Vandross

- Single Cover

Single by Luther Vandross

from the album Give Me the Reason & Ruthless People Soundtrack
- Released: 1986
- Recorded: 1986
- Genre: R&B
- Length: 4:39
- Label: Epic
- Songwriters: Luther Vandross, Nat Adderley, Jr.
- Producer: Marcus Miller

Luther Vandross singles chronology
| "Wait for Love" (1985) | "Give Me the Reason" (1986) | "Stop to Love" (1986) |

Professional ratings
Review scores
| Source | Rating |
|---|---|
| Number One | 5/5 stars |

"Give Me the Reason" is a song by American recording artist Luther Vandross, issued as the first single from the album of the same name (1986). The single was a top-five hit on Billboard's Hot Black Singles chart. It also reached No. 57 on the Billboard Hot 100.

== Critical reception ==
In review of "Give Me the Reason", Karen Swayne from Number One wrote that "it's one of the most seductive sounds you'll ever hear, featuring a voice like melted chocolate caressing a melody so sexy you'll think all your Valentine's Days have come at once."

== Music video ==
The single's music video was directed by Andy Morahan. It features Vandross behind a greenscreen, putting himself in certain scenes of the movie Ruthless People.

== Charts ==
| Chart (1986) | Peak position |
|---|---|
| UK Singles Chart | 26 |
| U.S. Billboard Hot 100 | 57 |
| U.S. Billboard Hot R&B Singles | 3 |
