= Never Too Much (album) =

1981 studio album by Luther Vandross

Studio album by Luther Vandross
- Released: August 12, 1981
- Recorded: April–July 1981
- Studio: Media Sound (New York City)
- Genre: R&B
- Length: 36:50
- Label: Epic
- Producer: Luther Vandross

Luther Vandross chronology
Never Too Much (1981)	Forever, for Always, for Love (1982)

Singles from Luther Vandross
- 1. "Never Too Much" Released: July 21, 1981; 2. "Don't You Know That?" Released: December 1981

Never Too Much is the debut solo studio album by American singer Luther Vandross, released on August 12, 1981, by Epic Records. Mostly composed by Vandross himself, the album reached number 19 on the US Billboard 200 and number one on the Top R&B/Hip-Hop Albums chart, and has been certified double platinum by the Recording Industry Association of America (RIAA). Never Too Much earned Vandross two Grammy Award nominations in 1982, including Best New Artist and Best R&B Vocal Performance, Male.

The album's title track topped the Black Singles chart for two weeks. Vandross's rendition of Dionne Warwick's 1964 song "A House Is Not a Home" became one of his signature songs, and received attention for its transformation into an "epic", since its duration was extended to seven minutes. In 2020, the album was ranked number 362 on Rolling Stone's 500 Greatest Albums of All Time.

== Critical reception ==
Professional ratings
Review scores
Source	Rating
AllMusic	5/5 stars
Chicago Tribune	3/4 stars
Robert Christgau	B+
Rolling Stone	5/5 stars

AllMusic editor Craig Lytle found that Never Too Much featured "one outstanding song after another. Vandross concocts a bouncy, vibrant flow on his up-tempo numbers and an intimate, emotional connection on his moderate grooves and his lone ballad [...] This is one of the better R&B albums of the early '80s." Robert Christgau wrote about the album: "In music as tactful as this, where so much of the meaning is carried on the skip and flow of rhythm and timbre, songwriting doesn't matter all that much. So Vandross can attach tropes like "sugar and spice" and "she's a super lady" to undistinguished melodies and make me like them. But when his touch is just a little off, the great hit single you've just heard (or at least the good one that's sure to follow) seems almost as forgettable as the loser he's singing."

== Track listing ==
All tracks are written by Luther Vandross, except "A House Is Not a Home", written by Burt Bacharach and Hal David.

Side one
No.	Title	Length
1.	"Never Too Much"	3:50
2.	"Sugar and Spice (I Found Me a Girl)"	4:57
3.	"Don't You Know That?"	4:01
4.	"I've Been Working"	6:35

Side two
No.	Title	Length
5.	"She's a Super Lady"	5:04
6.	"You Stopped Loving Me"	5:16
7.	"A House Is Not a Home"	7:07

== Personnel ==
Adapted from AllMusic.

Performers and musicians

- Luther Vandross – lead vocals, vocal arrangements, rhythm arrangements (1–3, 5–7), backing vocals (1, 3–6), arrangements (4), song arrangements (7)
- Nat Adderley, Jr. – keyboards, rhythm arrangements (1–3, 5, 6), arrangements (4), backing vocals (4, 5)
- Ed Walsh – synthesizers (2, 4)
- Georg Wadenius – guitars (1–3, 7)
- Steve Love – guitars (3–6)
- Marcus Miller – bass (1–6)
- Anthony Jackson – bass (7)
- Buddy Williams – drums
- Errol "Crusher" Bennett – percussion (1, 4, 5, 7), congas (4)
- Bashiri Johnson – congas (1, 2), percussion (2, 5)
- Billy King – congas (3, 5, 6)
- Paul Riser – horn arrangements (2, 5), string arrangements (2, 3, 5)
- Gary King – arrangements (4)
- Leon Pendarvis – string arrangements (6, 7), horn arrangements (7)
- Tawatha Agee – backing vocals (1–6)
- Michelle Cobbs – backing vocals (1, 2)
- Cissy Houston – backing vocals (1, 2)
- Yvonne Lewis – backing vocals (1, 2)
- Sybil Thomas – backing vocals (1, 2)
- Brenda White King – backing vocals (1, 2)
- Phillip Ballou – backing vocals (3–6)
- Fonzi Thornton – backing vocals (4, 5), vocal contractor
- Norma Jean Wright – backing vocals (4, 5)

Production and Technical

- Larkin Arnold – executive producer
- Luther Vandross – producer
- Michael Brauer – recording, mixing
- Carl Beatty – engineer
- Lincoln Clapp – assistant engineer
- Andy Hoffman – assistant engineer
- Nicky Kalliongos – assistant engineer
- Gregg Mann – assistant engineer
- Don Wershba – assistant engineer
- Greg Calbi – mastering at Sterling Sound (New York, NY)
- Sephra Herman – production coordinator
- Karen Katz – art direction
- William Coupon – photography
- Hutaff Lennon Jr. – wardrobe
- David Franklin – management

== Charts ==
=== Weekly charts ===
1981 weekly chart performance for Never Too Much
Chart (1981)	Peak position
US Billboard 200	19
US Top R&B/Hip-Hop Albums (Billboard)	1

1987 weekly chart performance for Never Too Much
Chart (1987)	Peak position
UK Albums (OCC)	41

=== Year-end charts ===
Year-end chart performance for Never Too Much
Chart (1982)	Position
US Billboard 200	56
US Top R&B/Hip-Hop Albums (Billboard)	8

== Certifications ==
Certifications for Never Too Much
Region	Certification	Certified units/sales
United States (RIAA)	2× Platinum	2,000,000^{^}
^{^} Shipments figures based on certification alone.

== See also ==
- List of Billboard number-one R&B albums of 1981
