= I Really Didn't Mean It =

Single by Luther Vandross

from the album Give Me the Reason
- Released: April 1987 (U.S.)
- Recorded: 1986
- Genre: R&B, soul
- Length: 5:43
- Label: Epic Records
- Songwriters: L. Vandross, M. Miller
- Producers: Luther Vandross, Marcus Miller

Luther Vandross singles chronology
""There's Nothing Better Than Love" (with Gregory Hines)" (1986)	"I Really Didn't Mean It" (1987)	"Any Love" (1988)

"I Really Didn't Mean It" is a 1987 song by American recording R&B/soul artist Luther Vandross. The track was the fourth and final single released from his multi-platinum album Give Me the Reason. The song was a top ten R&B hit on Billboards Hot Black Singles chart.

== Charts ==
Chart (1987)	Peak position
UK Singles Chart	16
U.S. Billboard Hot Black Singles	6
