= There's Nothing Better Than Love =

Single by Luther Vandross

from the album Give Me the Reason
- Released: 1987
- Recorded: 1986
- Length: 4:42
- Label: Epic Records
- Songwriter(s): Luther Vandross, Skip Anderson
- Producer(s): Luther Vandross

Luther Vandross singles chronology
| "Stop to Love" (1986) | "There's Nothing Better Than Love" (1987) | "I Really Didn't Mean It" (1987) |

"There's Nothing Better Than Love" is a 1987 song by American recording artist Luther Vandross, with guest vocals by actor/dancer/singer Gregory Hines. The single peaked at number 1 on the Billboard R&B chart for one week, and peaked at number 50 on the Billboard Hot 100 chart.

== Charts ==
| Chart (1987) | Peak position |
|---|---|
| US Billboard Hot 100 | 50 |
| US Billboard Hot R&B Singles | 1 |
| US Billboard Hot Adult Contemporary Tracks | 20 |
