= Stop to Love (song) =

Single by Luther Vandross

from the album Give Me the Reason
- Released: August 1986 (U.S., U.K.)
- Genre: R&B, soul
- Length: 5:19 (album version); 4:23 (single version)
- Label: Epic
- Songwriters: Luther Vandross; Nat Adderley Jr.
- Producers: Luther Vandross, Marcus Miller

Luther Vandross singles chronology
| "Give Me the Reason" (1986) | "Stop to Love" (1986) | "There's Nothing Better Than Love" (1987) |

Music video
- "Stop To Love" on YouTube

"Stop To Love"
Luther Vandross' "Stop To Love" from Give Me the Reason

"Stop to Love" is a song by American recording R&B/soul artist Luther Vandross. Released in 1986 as the lead single from his album Give Me the Reason. It was his first number-one single on the R&B chart since "Never Too Much" in 1981. The upbeat single was also a crossover hit, peaking at number 15 on the Billboard Hot 100.

== Music video ==
The official music video for the song was directed by Andy Morahan. It features Vandross and various models lip syncing "stop" while riding around in the streets of Los Angeles.

== Track listing ==
US 7" Single

1. A-Side "Stop To Love" - 4:08 (Single Version)
2. B-Side "Stop To Love"- 4:55 (Instrumental Version)

UK 10" Single

1. A1 "Stop To Love" (Remix) - 5:27
2. B1 "Never Too Much" - 3:51
3. B2 "Stop To Love" - (Instrumental) - 5:05

== Charts ==
| Chart (1986–87) | Peak position |
|---|---|
| UK Singles Chart | 24 |
| U.S. Cash Box Top 100 | 15 |
| U.S. Billboard Adult Contemporary | 7 |
| U.S. Billboard Hot 100 | 15 |
| U.S. Billboard Hot Black Singles | 1 |
| U.S. Billboard Hot Dance Club Play | 27 |
