= Any Love (album) =

Studio album by Luther Vandross
- Released: September 20, 1988
- Recorded: December 1987–June 1988
- Studio: A&M Studios (Hollywood, Los Angeles, California); Right Track Recording (New York City, New York)
- Genre: R&B
- Length: 47:37
- Label: Epic
- Producer: Luther Vandross; Marcus Miller

Luther Vandross chronology
Give Me the Reason (1986)	Any Love (1988)	The Best of Luther Vandross... The Best of Love (1989)

Singles from Any Love
- 1. "Any Love" Released: August 1, 1988; 2. "She Won't Talk to Me" Released: November 1, 1988; 3. "For You to Love" Released: February 1, 1989

Any Love is the sixth studio album by American singer Luther Vandross. It was released by Epic Records on September 20, 1988, in the United States. Produced by Vandross and Marcus Miller, the album features a cover of Major Harris' hit single "Love Won't Let Me Wait" as well as "The Second Time Around," a re-recording of a song featured on Vandross's band Luther's 1976 album of the same name.

The album reached number nine on the US Billboard 200 and peaked at number three on the UK Albums Chart, also reaching the top position on the US Top R&B/Hip-Hop Albums. It was eventually certified platinum by the Recording Industry Association of America (RIAA) and silver by the British Phonographic Industry (BPI). At the 1989 Grammy Awards, Any Love was nominated for Best R&B Vocal Performance, Male, while its title track was nominated for Best R&B Song. Also, "She Won't Talk to Me" received a nomination for Best R&B Vocal Performance, Male in 1990.

== Critical reception ==
Professional ratings
Review scores
Source	Rating
AllMusic	4.5/5 stars
Chicago Tribune	3/4 stars
Robert Christgau	B−
Los Angeles Times	4/4 stars
Rolling Stone	3/5 stars

AllMusic editor Ron Wynn noted that while "there were some who felt that Vandross suffered a slight slump when this album only reached the platinum level after two consecutive double-platinum winners, [...] "Here And Now" was a huge smash, and by now the pop crowd was fully aware of Vandross' vocal charms and allure. "She Won't Talk To Me" was a bit on the posturing side, but still managed to do decently, while there were also fine album cuts like "I Wonder" and "Are You Gonna Love Me."." Connie Johnson from the Los Angeles Times wrote that "Vandross’ music never touches on the global, political concerns of Stevie Wonder’s, but Vandross travels across the emotional terrain of the heart in a way that has made him as major a talent. What you get in his music are elements of sadness, loneliness and sensitivity that few other male vocal stylists of the day express as convincingly." Rolling Stone critic Rob Hoerburger felt that "there’s no question that Any Love is as masterful an album as Vandross has made; it’s probably only likable, though, for those who get off on severe bouts of melancholia."

== Track listing ==
All tracks produced by Luther Vandross and Marcus Miller.

Side One
No.	Title	Writer(s)	Length
1.	"I Wonder"	Luther Vandross; Nat Adderley, Jr.	5:12
2.	"She Won't Talk to Me"	Vandross; Hubert Eaves III	4:37
3.	"I Know You Want to"	Vandross; David Gamson; Porter Carroll, Jr.	4:30
4.	"Come Back"	Vandross; Gamson	4:16
5.	"Any Love"	Vandross; Marcus Miller	5:05

Side Two
No.	Title	Writer(s)	Length
6.	"Love Won't Let Me Wait"	Bobby Eli; Vinnie Barrett	7:19
7.	"Are You Gonna Love Me"	Vandross; Miller	5:10
8.	"For You to Love"	Vandross; Miller	5:39
9.	"The Second Time Around"	Vandross	6:21

== Personnel ==
Credits adapted from the album's liner notes.

Performers and musicians

- Luther Vandross – lead vocals, backing vocals (1, 4, 5, 7, 8)
- Nat Adderley Jr. – keyboards (1, 6), synthesizers (1, 6), arrangements (1), rhythm and synthesizer arrangements (6), string arrangements (6, 8), keyboard synthesizers (9)
- Marcus Miller – additional synthesizers (1, 3), keyboard synthesizers (2, 4, 5, 7, 8), bass (2, 4–9), arrangements (2–5, 7, 8)
- Jason Miles – synthesizer programming (2–9)
- David Gamson – keyboard synthesizers (3, 4), arrangements (3, 4)
- Paul Jackson Jr. – guitars
- Doc Powell – guitars (6)
- Buddy Williams – drum overdubs
- Paulinho da Costa – percussion (1–4, 6–8)
- Amy Knoles – timpani (6)
- Kirk Whalum – soprano saxophone (6)
- George Young – soprano sax solo (9)
- Hubert Eaves III – arrangements (2)
- Paul Riser – horn, rhythm and string arrangements (9)
- Alfred Brown – string contractor (9)
- Lisa Fischer – backing vocals (1–4, 6, 7), additional backing vocals (9)
- James Ingram – backing vocals (1)
- David Lasley – backing vocals (1)
- Michael Lovesmith – backing vocals (1, 2)
- Kevin Owens – backing vocals (1, 2, 4, 7)
- Mark Stevens – backing vocals (1, 2)
- Darryl Tookes – backing vocals (1)
- Tawatha Agee – backing vocals (2–4, 7)
- Cissy Houston – backing vocals (2–4, 6, 7)
- Paulette McWilliams – backing vocals (2–4, 6, 7), additional backing vocals (9)
- Fonzi Thornton – backing vocals (2, 4, 7)
- Brenda White King – backing vocals (2–4, 6, 7)
- Michelle Cobbs – backing vocals (4)
- Anthony Hinton – backing vocals (9)
- Theresa V. Reed – backing vocals (9)
- Diane Sumler – backing vocals (9)
- Christine Wiltshire – backing vocals (9)

Horns on "The Second Time Around"

- Jerome Ashby
- Peter Gordon
- Harold Jones
- Dave Tofani
- Randy Brecker
- Jon Faddis
- John Miller
- Alan Rubin
- Homer Mensch

Production and Technical

- Marcus Miller – producer
- Luther Vandross – producer, vocal arrangements
- Ray Bardani – engineer, mixing
- Denise Brown – additional engineer
- Brendan Fenton – additional engineer
- Mary Frengen – additional engineer
- Micah Goldberg – additional engineer
- Peter Grammatico – additional engineer
- Michael White – additional engineer
- Debi Cornish – assistant engineer
- Marc DeSisto – mix assistant
- Fred Bova – technician
- Michael Morengell – technician
- Gary Myerberg – technician
- Greg Calbi – mastering at Sterling Sound (New York, NY)
- Robert Ferguson – keyboard maintenance
- Fonzi Thornton – vocal contractor
- Marsha K. Burns – production coordinator
- Elijah Reeder – personal assistance
- George Corsillo – art direction, design
- Matthew Rolston – photography
- James "JT" Taylor – hair design
- Jeff Jones – hair stylist, make-up
- Cherie Lazerus – studio manager

== Charts ==
=== Weekly charts ===
Chart (1988)	Peak position
Australian Albums (ARIA)	103
Dutch Albums (Album Top 100)	73
New Zealand Albums (RMNZ)	35
UK Albums (OCC)	3
US Billboard 200	9
US Top R&B/Hip-Hop Albums (Billboard)	1

=== Year-end charts ===
Chart (1989)	Position
US Top R&B/Hip-Hop Albums (Billboard)	11

== Certifications ==
Region	Certification	Certified units/sales
United Kingdom (BPI)	Silver	60,000^{^}
United States (RIAA)	Platinum	1,000,000^{^}
^{^} Shipments figures based on certification alone.

== See also ==
- List of number-one R&B albums of 1988 (U.S.)
