= Any Love (Luther Vandross song) =

Single by Luther Vandross

from the album Any Love
- Released: August 1, 1988
- Genre: R&B
- Length: 5:05
- Label: Epic
- Songwriters: Luther Vandross; Marcus Miller
- Producers: Luther Vandross; Marcus Miller

Luther Vandross singles chronology
"I Really Didn't Mean It" (1987)	"Any Love" (1988)	"She Won't Talk to Me" (1988)

"Any Love" is song by American singer Luther Vandross, released by Epic Records on August 1, 1988 as the lead single from his sixth studio album of the same name (1988).

== Chart performance ==
"Any Love" earned Vandross his fourth No. 1 single on Billboards Hot Black Singles Chart, and No.44 on the Hot 100. "Any Love" also peaked at No. 12 on the Adult Contemporary Chart. Outside the US, "Any Love" went to No. 31 in the UK.

== Personnel ==
- Luther Vandross – lead and background vocals
- Marcus Miller – keyboard synthesizers, bass, arrangements
- Jason Miles – synthesizer programming
- Paul Jackson Jr. – guitar
- Buddy Williams – drum overdubs

== Charts ==
Chart (1988)	Peak position
UK Singles (Official Charts)	31
US Adult Contemporary (Billboard)	12
US Billboard Hot 100	44
US Hot R&B/Hip-Hop Songs (Billboard)	1

== Accolades ==
The song also garnered two Grammy Award nominations at the 31st Annual Grammy Awards for Best R&B Song and Best Male R&B Vocal Performance.
