= Luther Vandross =

American singer (1951–2005)

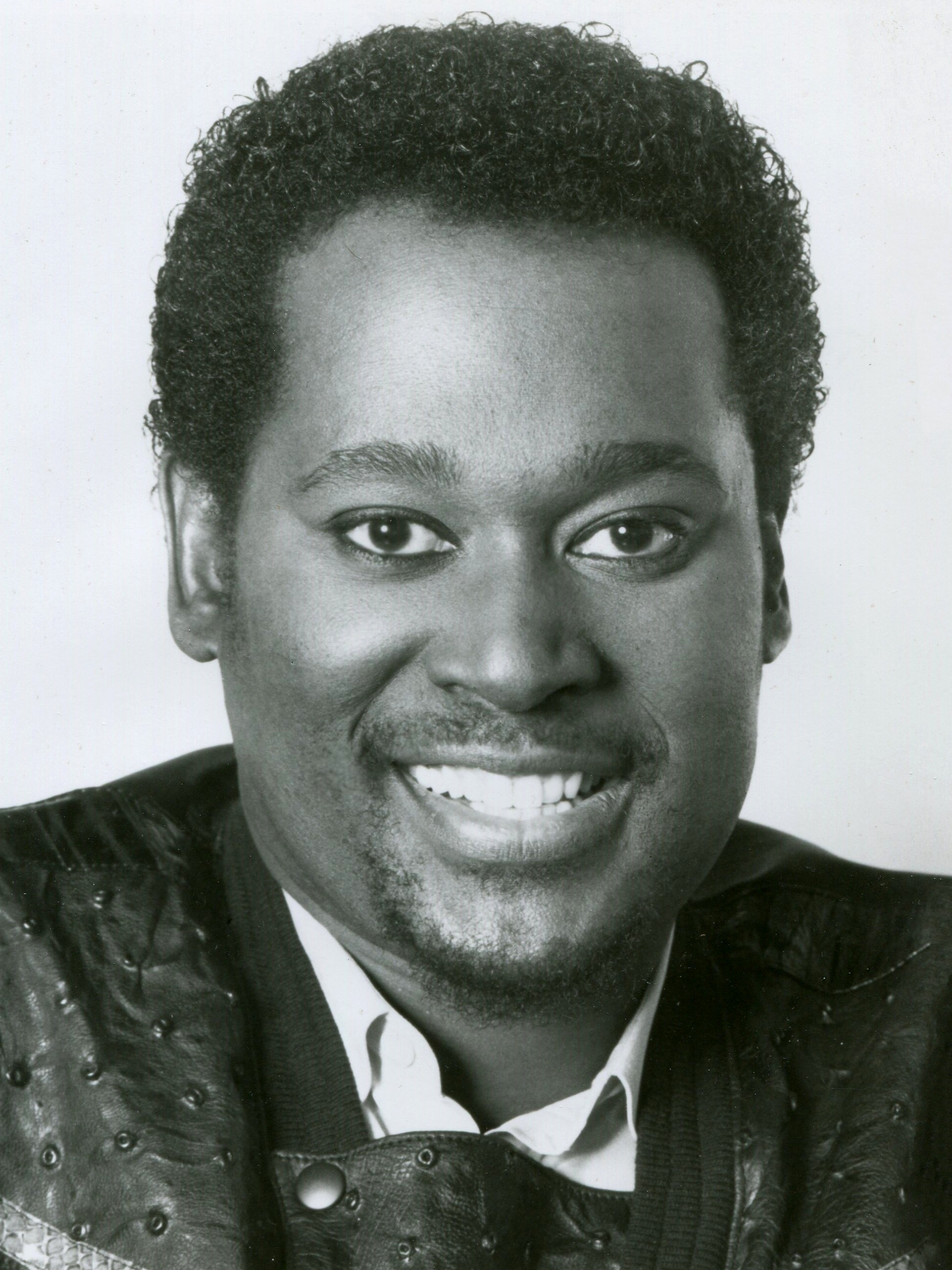
- Vandross in 1985

Background information
- Born: Luther Ronzoni Vandross Jr. April 20, 1951; New York City, U.S.
- Died: July 1, 2005 (aged 54) Edison, New Jersey, U.S.
- Genres: R&B; soul; disco; quiet storm
- Occupations: Singer; songwriter; record producer
- Instruments: Vocals; piano
- Years active: 1969–2005
- Labels: Cotillion; Epic; Virgin; J; Sony; Legacy
- Website: luthervandross.com

Luther Ronzoni Vandross Jr. (/ˈvændroʊs/ VAN-drohss; April 20, 1951 – July 1, 2005) was an American R&B and soul singer, songwriter, and record producer. Over his career, he achieved eleven consecutive RIAA-certified platinum albums and sold over 40 million records worldwide. Vandross was recognized by Rolling Stone as one of the 200 greatest singers of all time (2023) and was named one of the greatest R&B artists by Billboard. NPR also included him among its 50 Great Voices. He won eight Grammy Awards, including Song of the Year in 2004 for "Dance with My Father". He has been inducted into the National Rhythm & Blues Hall of Fame, the Grammy Hall of Fame, and the Rock and Roll Hall of Fame.

Vandross began his music career in the late 1960s performing at the Apollo Theater in New York City as part of a local musical ensemble. The group later appeared on the television show Sesame Street in the early 1970s. He eventually established himself as a sought-after backing vocalist, contributing to albums by Roberta Flack, Donny Hathaway, Todd Rundgren, Evelyn "Champagne" King, Judy Collins, Chaka Khan, Bette Midler, Diana Ross, David Bowie, Ben E. King, Stevie Wonder, Laura Branigan, Donna Summer, Chic, and Roxy Music. In 1980, he served as the lead vocalist for the post-disco group Change on their Gold-certified album The Glow of Love, released on Warner/RFC Records.

After Vandross left the group, he was signed to Epic Records as a solo artist and released his debut solo album, Never Too Much, in 1981. In 1982, he was credited as the primary producer on Aretha Franklin's album Jump to it, which topped the Billboard R&B Albums chart. His hit songs include "Never Too Much", "Here and Now", "Any Love", "Power of Love/Love Power", "I Can Make It Better", and "For You to Love". He also recorded several covers of songs originally performed by other artists, including "A House Is Not a Home", "Since I Lost My Baby", "Superstar", "I (Who Have Nothing)", and "Always and Forever".

Vandross collaborated on several notable duets, including "The Closer I Get to You" with Beyoncé, "Endless Love" with Mariah Carey, and "The Best Things in Life Are Free" with Janet Jackson of which the latter two were hit songs in his career. The tribute album So Amazing: An All-Star Tribute to Luther Vandross was released shortly after his death. In 2024, Kendrick Lamar and SZA released the chart-topping single "Luther", paying homage to Vandross and sampling his rendition of "If This World Were Mine", a duet with Cheryl Lynn. In January of that same year, he was the subject of the documentary Luther: Never Too Much, which chronicles his life, career, and legacy. In 2026, Vandross was inducted into the Rock and Roll Hall of Fame.

== Early life ==
Luther Ronzoni Vandross Jr. was born on April 20, 1951, at Bellevue Hospital in the Kips Bay neighborhood of Manhattan, New York City. Vandross was African-American. His birth occurred concurrently with General Douglas MacArthur's ticker-tape parade throughout the city. He was the fourth and youngest son of Mary Ida Vandross and Luther Vandross Sr, and his older siblings were Patricia, Ann, and Anthony. His father was an upholsterer and singer, and his mother was a nurse. Vandross was raised on Manhattan's Two Bridges's neighborhood in the Alfred E. Smith Houses public housing development. At the age of three, having his own phonograph, Vandross taught himself to play the piano by ear.

His father died of diabetes when Vandross was eight years old. In 2003, Vandross wrote the song "Dance with My Father" and dedicated it to him; the title was based on his childhood memories and his mother's recollections of the family singing and dancing in the house. His family moved to the Bronx when he was nine. His older sisters, Patricia "Pat" and Ann, began taking Vandross to the Apollo Theater and to a theater in Brooklyn to see Dionne Warwick and Aretha Franklin perform. Patricia sang with the vocal group The Crests and was featured on the songs "My Juanita" and "Sweetest One".

Vandross graduated from William Howard Taft High School in the Bronx in 1969. He attended Western Michigan University for one-and-a-half semesters before dropping out to continue pursuing a career in music.

== Career ==
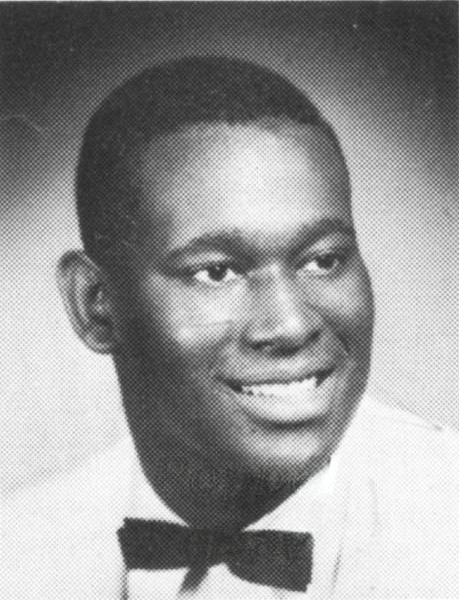
Vandross in his 1969 school yearbook

While in high school, Vandross founded the first Patti LaBelle fan club, of which he was president. He formed a quartet with other students and won a summer talent show. Because each member of the quartet attended a different school, the quartet broke up. Vandross then formed a new group, Shades of Jade, that once played at the Apollo Theater. During his early years in show business, he appeared several times at the Apollo's famous amateur night.

Vandross, along with some members of his previous two groups, joined Listen My Brother, a workshop group based at the Apollo Theater. They released one single "Only Love Can Make a Better World". The group performed in front of tens of thousands at the Harlem Cultural Festival in late August 1969. Directly afterward, the group appeared in the pilot episode and other episodes of the first season of Sesame Street during 1969–1970.

=== Session work and groups ===
Starting in 1972, Vandross began a career as a session vocalist, starting with adding backing vocals to Roberta Flack & Donny Hathaway in 1972, and worked on Delores Hall's Hall-Mark album (1973), duetting with her on the song "Who's Gonna Make It Easier for Me", a song he wrote, and contributed another song, "In This Lonely Hour". In 1974, he began working with British rocker David Bowie on his album, Young Americans. In addition to contributing background vocals, most notably on the title track, which Vandross himself conducted the background, Vandross allowed Bowie to use his composition, "Funky Music (Is a Part of Me)", and he and Bowie re-wrote as "Fascination". Vandross joined Bowie's tour as a backing vocalist in September 1974. Vandross also contributed the song, "Everybody Rejoice", to the Broadway musical, The Wiz (1975). During this era, Vandross would back several artists including Roberta Flack, Chaka Khan, Ben E. King, Bette Midler, Diana Ross, Carly Simon, Barbra Streisand, David Bowie, Cat Stevens, Gary Glitter, Ringo Starr, Sister Sledge, and Donna Summer, and for the bands Mandrill, Chic, Roxy Music, and Todd Rundgren's Utopia.

In 1975, Vandross formed his own band, Luther, which consisted of former Shades of Jade members Anthony Hinton and Diane Sumler, as well as Theresa V. Reed, and Christine Wiltshire. The band signed with Cotillion Records that year and released their self-titled debut, Luther, which featured the relatively successful top 40 R&B singles "It's Good for the Soul" and "Funky Music (Is a Part of Me)", in 1976. A year later, the band dropped their second and final album, This Close to You (1977), featuring the top 40 R&B hit "The Second Time Around". In 1977, the band opened for Marvin Gaye at Radio City Music Hall. Neither of the band's albums sold enough copies to make the charts. After Cotillion dropped the group, Vandross bought back the rights to those albums, preventing them from being re-released. Both albums were eventually re-released in 2024. From 1977 until the early 1980s, Vandross wrote and sang commercial jingles for companies such as NBC, Mountain Dew, Kentucky Fried Chicken, Burger King, and Juicy Fruit. A year prior, in 1976, Vandross' "Everybody Rejoice" was used in a Kodak commercial.

Vandross was noted for his work with the disco group, Chic, heavily conducting background vocals for most of the band's albums, most prominently on songs such as "Dance, Dance, Dance (Yowsah, Yowsah, Yowsah)", "Everybody Dance" and "Le Freak". In 1978, he sang lead vocals for Gregg Diamond's disco band, Bionic Boogie, on the song titled "Hot Butterfly" and sang a duet with Patti Austin on the song "I'm Gonna Miss You in the Morning" on Quincy Jones's Sounds...and Stuff Like That!! that same year. Later, "Hot Butterfly" was covered by Chaka Khan on her 1980 album, Naughty, under the name, "Papillon", in which Vandross contributed background vocals. Around the time of him working on Khan's album, Vandross met a teenage Whitney Houston, who had been brought to the studio by her mother and Vandross' fellow session singing partner Cissy Houston. The two young singers forged a lifelong friendship. In 1980, Vandross had his career breakthrough when he became the featured singer in the pop-dance act, Change, a studio concept created by French-Italian businessman Jacques Fred Petrus. Vandross sang lead vocals on the group's hits, "The Glow of Love" and "Searching". In a 2001 interview with Vibe, Vandross said "The Glow of Love" was "the most beautiful song I've ever sung in my life." Both songs were from Change's debut album, The Glow of Love. Vandross was originally intended to perform on their second and highly successful album Miracles in 1981, but declined the offer as Petrus didn't pay enough money. Vandross's decision led to a recording contract with Epic Records that same year, but he also provided background vocals on "Miracles" and on the new Petrus-created act, the B. B. & Q. Band in 1981.

=== Early solo career ===
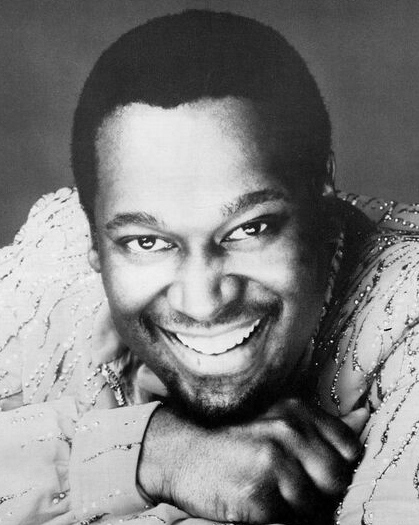
Vandross in 1982

Vandross signed a solo deal with Epic Records shortly after his tenure with Change. Later in 1981, he released his debut album, Never Too Much, which topped the Billboard R&B Albums chart. The self-penned and produced title track was an immediate success, topping the Hot Soul Singles chart for two weeks and peaked at number four on the National Disco Action Top 80 chart, while the post-disco track crossed over to the Billboard Hot 100, peaking inside the top 40. Its follow-up single, "Don't You Know That?", peaked at number 10 on the Billboard soul charts. The album marked the beginning of a songwriting collaboration with bassist Marcus Miller, who played on many of the tracks and would also produce or co-produce several tracks for Vandross. The Never Too Much album was arranged by Vandross's high school classmate, Nat Adderley Jr., a collaboration that would last throughout Vandross's career. It was also notable for his reinterpretation and "radical" re-arrangement of Dionne Warwick's "A House Is Not a Home", which while it didn't chart, became one of his well known songs and would remain a showstopper in Vandross's concert tours for the remainder of his career. Never Too Much would eventually be certified double-platinum by the Recording Industry Association of America and its success led to Vandross winning one of his first Grammy Award nominations for Best New Artist in 1982. During 1982, Vandross began producing for other artists, most notably Cheryl Lynn's Instant Love and Aretha Franklin's Jump to It. On the former, Vandross and Lynn released a slow jam rendition of Marvin Gaye and Tammi Terrell's "If This World Were Mine", which peaked at number four on the newly renamed Black Singles chart. Vandross' work on Franklin's Jump to It led to the title track topping the R&B chart and the album itself became Franklin's first gold-certified album in six years.

His sophomore album, Forever, For Always, For Love, was released in 1982 and topped the R&B Albums chart, going platinum thanks to hits such as "Bad Boy/Having a Party" and his rendition of the Temptations' "Since I Lost My Baby". The song, "She Loves Me Back", was later covered by New Zealand band DD Smash, who had a local hit cover with the song two years later. The title track and "Promise Me" also became popular songs on R&B radio. In 1983, Vandross produced Aretha Franklin's Get It Right, which featured the title track, which topped the R&B charts. In the same year, Vandross worked with his main musical influence, Dionne Warwick, producing Warwick's album, How Many Times Can We Say Goodbye. The title track duet was Vandross's second top 40 pop hit and also reached the top five of the Adult Contemporary chart. On the same album, Warwick recorded the Vandross ballad, "So Amazing", which became a Vandross solo hit several years later. "How Many Times Can We Say Goodbye" was featured on Vandross' third album, Busy Body, released in November 1983 and became his third consecutive number one R&B album and was notable for the ballad "Make Me a Believer" as well as "Superstar"/"Until You Come Back to Me (That's What I'm Gonna Do)", which reached the top five of the Black Singles chart in 1984 and became another signature staple for Vandross. Vandross was the voice of a cartoon character named Zack for ABC's Zack of All Trades, a three Saturday morning animated PSA spots.

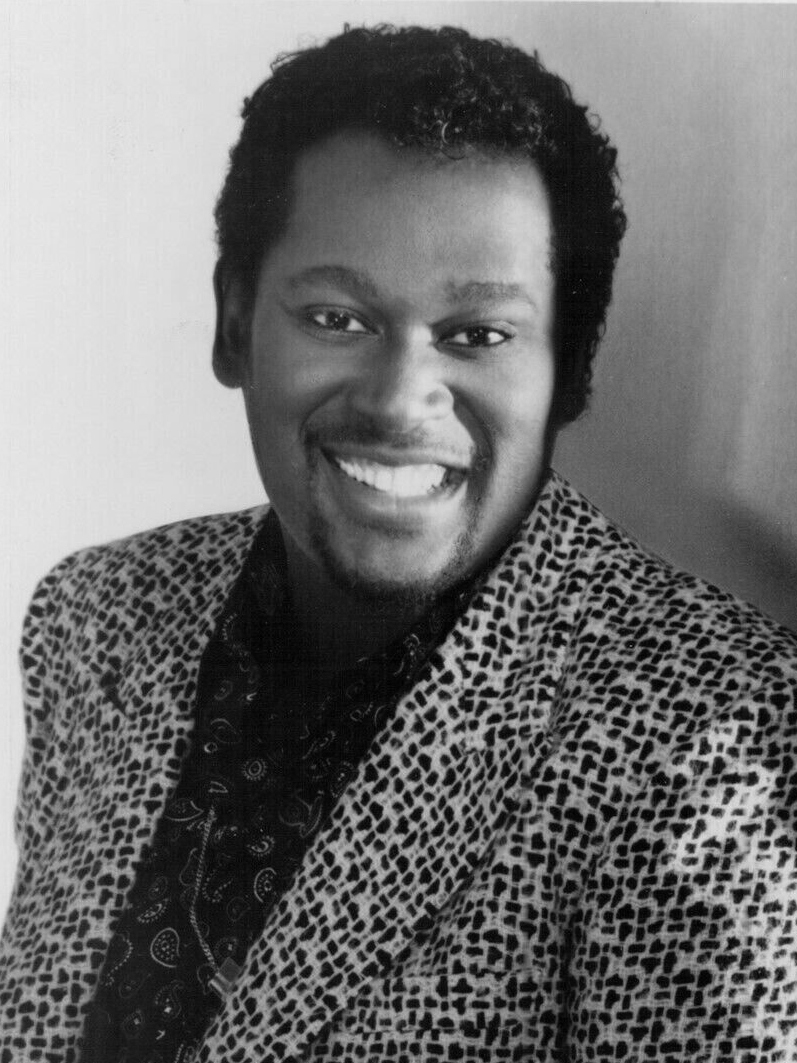
Vandross in 1985

Vandross followed that up with The Night I Fell in Love in 1985, which topped the R&B Albums chart and went double platinum due to singles such as "Til My Baby Comes Home", "It's Over Now", "Wait for Love" and his rendition of Brenda Russell's "If Only for One Night", which was sometimes accompanied by his rendition of Stevie Wonder's "Creepin'", that immediately followed the song on the album. That same year, Vandross added background vocals and ad-libs on Wonder's 1985 hit, "Part-Time Lover". Not too long afterwards, Vandross first spotted the talent of Jimmy Salvemini, who was 15 at the time, on Star Search. He thought Salvemini had the perfect voice for some of his songs and contacted him. He was managed by his brother, Larry Salvemini. A contract was negotiated with Elektra Records for $250,000 and Vandross agreed to produce the album. He contacted longtime friends Cheryl Lynn, Alfa Anderson (of Chic), Phoebe Snow and Irene Cara to appear on the record. Salvemini's album, Roll It, was released in 1986. That same year, he reunited with David Bowie after he added background vocals on Bowie's single "Underground", from the movie Labyrinth. In September 1986, Vandross' fifth solo album, Give Me the Reason, was released and like his previous albums before it, went to number one on the R&B Albums chart, while reaching number 14 on the Billboard 200, his highest peak at the time. The dance-pop song, "Stop to Love", became Vandross' first song to cross over to the top twenty of the Billboard Hot 100, partially due to the success of its music video, which achieved rotation on MTV, a channel Vandross had struggled to get on in the past. It also became his first top 40 hit in the UK peaking at number 24. The title track was a moderate pop success in the US but reached the top 40 in the UK, resulting in the album going two-times platinum in the country, his first album to do so. The album's follow-up hits included "There's Nothing Better Than Love" with Gregory Hines, "I Really Didn't Mean It" and "So Amazing" which, despite its low peak on the US R&B chart, became a well known song in his catalog.

In 1987, Vandross wrote and produced "It's Hard for Me to Say" for Diana Ross from her Red Hot Rhythm & Blues album. Ross performed the song as an a cappella tribute to Oprah Winfrey on her final season of The Oprah Winfrey Show. She then proceeded to add it to her successful 2010–12 "More Today Than Yesterday: The Greatest Hits Tour. Vandross also recorded a version of this song on his Your Secret Love album in 1996. In 1988, Vandross' sixth album, Any Love became his sixth consecutive number one R&B album and also became his first to reach the top ten of the Billboard 200. It went platinum off the strength of the autobiographical title track, the Grammy-nominated dance single "She Won't Talk to Me" and "For You to Love". Vandross ended the decade by releasing the double-disc compilation, The Best of Luther Vandross... The Best of Love, which produced Vandross's biggest pop hit at the time, "Here and Now", which peaked at number six on the Billboard Hot 100, becoming his first top ten pop single. The ballad later won Vandross his first Grammy Award for Best Male R&B Vocal Performance at the 33rd Annual Grammy Awards in 1991, nearly a decade after his first nominations. Upon hearing his name called as the winner, Vandross stood up to accept as the audience gave the singer a standing ovation, noting of Vandross' earlier struggles of winning a Grammy.

=== Later solo career ===
In 1990, Vandross wrote, produced and sang background for Whitney Houston in a song titled "Who Do You Love" which appeared on her album I'm Your Baby Tonight. In the same year, he guest starred in the series finale of the television sitcom 227. In 1991, Vandross' seventh studio album, Power of Love, was released and became his seventh consecutive number one R&B studio album. The album produced two crossover top ten hit ballads, "Power of Love/Love Power" and "Don't Want to Be a Fool" and became his fourth multi-platinum album, with the former track winning Vandross two Grammy Awards at the 34th Annual Grammy Awards in 1992. That same year, Vandross scored an international hit duet with Janet Jackson on the song, "The Best Things in Life Are Free", from the movie Mo' Money. It topped the Hot R&B Singles chart and peaked at number ten on the Billboard Hot 100, while also reaching number two in the United Kingdom. It's notable for being Vandross' final song to top the R&B chart. In 1993, he had a brief non-speaking role in the Robert Townsend movie The Meteor Man. He played a hit man who plotted to stop Townsend's title character. His next album, Never Let Me Go, broke Vandross' streak of number one R&B albums, peaking at number three, though it continued Vandross's streak of platinum albums. That following year, with production from Walter Afanasieff, Vandross released the covers album, Songs, which featured his top ten hit cover of Lionel Richie and Diana Ross's duet "Endless Love" with Mariah Carey, which peaked at number two.

Despite his success with Epic, however, Vandross was beginning to feel neglected by the label as it focused on younger pop artists rather than him. In 1996, he released what would be his final studio release with the label, Your Secret Love. The title track reached the top five of the R&B singles chart and reached number 14 in the UK, while only being moderately successful on the Billboard Hot 100 though it still resulted in another Grammy win in 1997 for Vandross. On January 26, 1997, Vandross sang the American national anthem, "The Star-Spangled Banner", during Super Bowl XXXI at the Louisiana Superdome in New Orleans. It was included in many best-of lists as one of the best versions of the national anthem performed at the Super Bowl. Following the release of a second compilation album, Vandross left Epic that year and signed with Virgin Records, releasing the album, I Know. The album reached number 26 on the Billboard 200 and number nine on the R&B albums chart upon release, becoming his lowest charting studio release of his career and breaking his streak of platinum albums, only going gold. Vandross left Virgin shortly afterwards and remained a free agent until he signed with J Records in 2000. With the label's president Clive Davis at the helm, Vandross worked with contemporary R&B producers on his self-titled album, Luther Vandross. The lead single, "Take You Out", reached number 26 on the Billboard Hot 100, becoming his most successful single in several years, helping the album to go platinum.

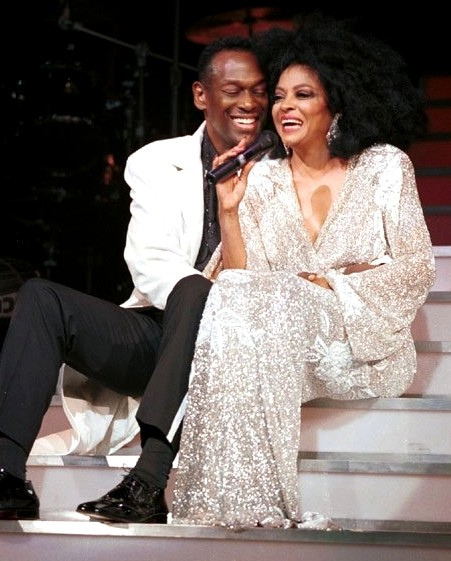
Vandross performing with Diana Ross at Madison Square Garden, July 6, 2000

He made two public appearances at Diana Ross's Return to Love Tour: at its opening in Philadelphia at First Union Spectrum and its final stop at Madison Square Garden on July 6, 2000. In September 2001, Vandross performed a rendition of Michael Jackson's hit song "Man in the Mirror" at Jackson's 30th Anniversary special, alongside Usher and 98 Degrees. In the spring of 2003, Vandross's last collaboration was Doc Powell's song "What's Going On", a cover of Marvin Gaye's seminal 1971 original, from Powell's album 97th and Columbus.

In 2003, Vandross released the album Dance with My Father. It sold 442,000 copies in the first week and debuted at No. 1 on the Billboard 200 album chart, becoming his first album in his career to do so. The title track, which was dedicated to Vandross's childhood memories of dancing with his father, won Vandross and his co-writer, Richard Marx, the 2004 Grammy Award for Song of the Year. The song also won Vandross his fourth and final award in the Best Male R&B Vocal Performance category. The album was his only career No. 1 on the Billboard album chart. The video for the title track features various celebrities alongside their fathers and other family members. The second single released from the album, "Think About You", was the No. 1 Urban Adult Contemporary Song of 2004 according to Radio & Records. In 2003, after the televised NCAA Men's Basketball championship, CBS Sports gave "One Shining Moment" a new look. Vandross, who had been to only one basketball game in his life, was the new singer, and the video had none of the special effects, like glowing basketballs and star trails, that videos from previous years had. This song version is in use today.

=== Posthumous releases ===
J Records released a song in 2006, "Shine" – an upbeat R&B track that samples Chic's disco song "My Forbidden Lover" – which reached No. 31 on the Billboard R&B chart. The song was originally slated to be released on the soundtrack to the movie, The Fighting Temptations, but it was shelved. A later remix of the song peaked at No. 10 on the Club Play chart. "Shine" and a track titled "Got You Home" were previously unreleased songs on The Ultimate Luther Vandross (2006), a greatest hits album on Epic Records/J Records/Legacy Recordings that was released August 22, 2006.

On October 16, 2007, Epic Records/J Records/Legacy Recordings released a 4-disc boxed set titled Love, Luther. It features nearly all of Vandross's R&B and pop hits throughout his career, as well as unreleased live tracks, alternate versions, and outtakes from sessions that Vandross recorded. The set also includes "There's Only You", a version of which had originally appeared on the soundtrack to the 1987 film Made in Heaven. In October 2015, Sony Music released a re-configured edition of its The Essential Luther Vandross compilation containing three unreleased songs: "Love It, Love It" (which made its premiere a year prior on the UK compilation The Greatest Hits), a live recording of "Bridge Over Troubled Water" with Paul Simon and Jennifer Holliday, and a cover of Astrud Gilberto's "Look to the Rainbow".

== Personal life ==
Vandross never married and had no children. His mother outlived all four of her children. Vandross was predeceased by his three elder siblings.

=== Sexual orientation ===
In 2006, Bruce Vilanch, a friend and colleague of Vandross, told Out magazine, "He said to me, 'No one knows I'm in the life.' ... He had very few sexual contacts". According to Vilanch, Vandross experienced his longest romantic relationship with a man while living in Los Angeles during the late 1980s and early 1990s. In December 2017, twelve years after his death, Vandross's friend Patti LaBelle confirmed that he was homosexual and that his sexuality was an open secret in the music industry. LaBelle further stated that "[Vandross] had a lot of lady fans" and "he just didn't want to upset the world".

In December 1985, Vandross filed a libel suit against a British magazine after it attributed his 85-pound weight loss to AIDS. He weighed 325 pounds (147 kg) when he started a diet in May of that year.

=== 1986 car crash ===
After signing Jimmy Salvemini and having completed his debut album Roll It, Vandross, Salvemini, and Salvemini's brother and manager Larry decided to celebrate. On January 12, 1986, they were riding in Vandross's convertible on Laurel Canyon Boulevard, in the north section of Hollywood Hills in Los Angeles. Vandross was driving at 50 mph (80 km/h) in a 35 mph (56 km/h) zone when he veered across the double yellow center line of the two lane street, turned sideways and collided with the front of a southbound car, then swung around and hit another car head on. Vandross and Salvemini were rushed to the Cedars-Sinai Medical Center.

Larry Salvemini, who was in the passenger seat, was killed in the collision. Vandross suffered three broken ribs, a broken hip, several bruises and facial cuts. Jimmy Salvemini, who was in the back of the car, had cuts, bruises, and contusions. Vandross faced vehicular manslaughter charges as a result of Larry's death, and his driving license was suspended for a year. There was no evidence that Vandross was under the influence of alcohol or other drugs; he pleaded no contest to reckless driving. At first, the Salvemini family was supportive of Vandross, but later filed a wrongful death suit against him. The case was settled out of court with a payment to the Salvemini family of approximately $630,000.

== Health problems and death ==
Vandross had diabetes and hypertension. On April 16, 2003, he had a severe stroke at his home in New York City and was in a coma for nearly two months. The stroke affected his ability to speak and sing and required him to use a wheelchair. He later regained the ability to walk as well as speak and sing.

At the 2004 Grammy Awards, Vandross appeared in a pre-taped video segment to accept his Song of the Year Award for "Dance with My Father", saying, "When I say good-bye, it's never for long, because I believe in the power of love" (Vandross sang the last six words). His mother, Mary, accepted the award in person on his behalf. His last public appearance was on May 6, 2004, on The Oprah Winfrey Show.

Vandross died on July 1, 2005, at the JFK Medical Center in Edison, New Jersey, at the age of 54 from a heart attack. Like his father and his three elder siblings, Vandross died due to complications of diabetes and asthma.

Vandross's funeral was held at Riverside Church in New York City on July 8, 2005. Aretha Franklin, Patti LaBelle, Stevie Wonder, Dionne Warwick and Cissy Houston were among the speakers and singers at the service. Vandross was buried at George Washington Memorial Park in Paramus, New Jersey.

== Artistry ==
Possessing a tenor vocal range, Vandross was commonly referred to as "The Velvet Voice", and was sometimes called "The Best Voice of a Generation". He was also regarded as the "Pavarotti of Pop" by many critics.

== Achievements ==
Between Never Too Much in 1981 and Your Secret Love in 1996, all of Vandross' studio releases went platinum or more in the United States. Along with a 1989 greatest hits compilation, Vandross had 12 consecutive million-selling albums, a record at the time for a male R&B artist. Except for his 1998 Virgin album, I Know, all of Vandross' studio releases were certified platinum or more. Of the 13, five of those albums went multiplatinum.

Vandross was also one of the most accomplished charting artists on the Hot R&B/Hip-Hop Songs chart throughout his career. Between 1981 and 1996, Vandross scored at least one top 40 single a year on the chart. Vandross sent 47 songs to the chart between 1981 and 2006, including two posthumous entries, of which 37 peaked inside the top 40, 27 reached the top 10, 18 reached the top five and seven of those songs topped the chart between 1981 and 1992. Between "Any Love" (1988) and "Little Miracles (Happen Every Day)" (1993), Vandross achieved eleven consecutive top ten singles on the chart.

Vandross had a more moderate but still significant success on the Billboard Hot 100, sending 25 songs to the chart between 1981 and 2003, including 12 songs inside the top 40 and six top 10 singles.

== Legacy ==
Vandross has been cited as an inspiration by a number of other artists, including 112, Boyz II Men, D'Angelo, Hootie & the Blowfish, Jaheim, John Legend, Mint Condition, Ne-Yo, Ruben Studdard, and Usher. Stokley Williams, the lead singer of Mint Condition, has said that he has "studied Luther for such a long time because he was the epitome of perfect tone." On his influence, John Legend has said, "All us people making slow jams now, we was inspired by the slow jams Luther Vandross was making."

Emmett Price, professor of ethnomusicology at Boston's Northeastern University, stated that Vandross's vocal range had him singing "one smooth hit after the other, without duplicating a rhythm or style", further explaining, "He was a transitory figure. He was a bridge between the era of Sam Cooke and Otis Redding. He made it relate to a contemporary audience."

In 2008, Vandross was ranked No. 54 on Rolling Stone magazine's List of 100 Greatest Singers of All Time. Fifteen years later, in 2023, the magazine ranked him No. 31 in their list of 200 Greatest Singers of All Time. Mariah Carey said in several interviews that standing next to Vandross while recording their duet "Endless Love" was intimidating. In 2010, NPR included Vandross in its 50 Greatest Voices in recorded history, saying Vandross represents "the platinum standard for R&B song stylings." The announcement was made on NPR's All Things Considered on November 29, 2010.

In 2014, Vandross posthumously received a star on the Hollywood Walk of Fame. In 2021, Vandross was inducted into the National Rhythm and Blues Hall of Fame. Vandross' debut album, Never Too Much, was inducted into the Grammy Hall of Fame in 2025. In February 2026, Vandross received his first nomination for the Rock and Roll Hall of Fame, 19 years after he was first eligible for induction. Vandross was inducted into the Rock and Roll Hall of Fame in April 2026, a few days before what would've been his 75th birthday.

=== Tributes ===
In 1999, Whitney Houston sang Vandross' "So Amazing" as a tribute to Vandross as he sat in the audience during the Soul Train Awards. Johnny Gill, El DeBarge, and Kenny Lattimore provided background vocals. On July 27, 2004, GRP Records released a smooth jazz various artists tribute album, Forever, for Always, for Luther, including ten popular songs written by Vandross. The album featured vocal arrangements by Luther and was produced by Rex Rideout and Bud Harner. Rideout had co-authored songs, contributed arrangements and played keyboards on Vandross's final three albums. The tribute album was mixed by Ray Bardani, who recorded and mixed most of Luther's music over the years. It featured an ensemble of smooth jazz performers, many of whom had previously worked with Vandross.

On September 20, 2005, the album So Amazing: An All-Star Tribute to Luther Vandross was released. The album is a collection of some of his songs performed by various artists, including Patti LaBelle, Stevie Wonder, Aretha Franklin, Mary J. Blige, Usher, Fantasia, Beyoncé, Donna Summer, Alicia Keys, Elton John, Celine Dion, Wyclef Jean, Babyface, John Legend, Angie Stone, Jamie Foxx, and Teddy Pendergrass. Aretha Franklin won a Grammy for her rendition of "A House Is Not a Home", and Stevie Wonder and Beyoncé won a Grammy for their cover of "So Amazing".

On November 21, 2006, saxophonist Dave Koz released a follow-up to the earlier smooth jazz GRP tribute album, this time on his own Rendezvous Entertainment label, an album called Forever, for Always, for Luther Volume II, also produced by Rex Rideout and Bud Harner. Koz played on all the featured Luther Vandross tracks, which were recorded by various smooth jazz artists. On April 20, 2021, Google celebrated his 70th birthday with a Google Doodle of an animated clip that plays Vandross's song "Never Too Much".

The 2024 documentary Luther: Never Too Much chronicles Vandross's life, career, and legacy.

== Discography ==
- Never Too Much (1981)
- Forever, for Always, for Love (1982)
- Busy Body (1983)
- The Night I Fell in Love (1985)
- Give Me the Reason (1986)
- Any Love (1988)
- Power of Love (1991)
- Never Let Me Go (1993)
- Songs (1994)
- This Is Christmas (1995)
- Your Secret Love (1996)
- I Know (1998)
- Luther Vandross (2001)
- Dance with My Father (2003)

== Tours ==
- Luther Tour (1981)
- Forever, for Always, for Love Tour (1982–1983)
- Busy Body Tour (1984)
- The Night I Fell in Love Tour (1985–1986)
- Give Me the Reason Tour (1987)
- The Heat (with Anita Baker) (1988)
- Any Love World Tour (1989)
- Best of Love Tour (1990)
- The Power of Love Tour (1991)
- Never Let Me Go World Tour (1993–1995)
- Your Secret Love World Tour (1997)
- Luther & Vanessa Live! (with Vanessa Williams) (1997)
- Take You Out Tour (2001–2002)
- BK Got Music Summer Soul Tour (with Gerald Levert, Angie Stone and Michelle Williams) (2002)

== Awards ==
Grammy Awards

Year	Nominee / work	Award	Result
1982	Luther Vandross	Best New Artist	Nominated
1982	Never Too Much	Best Male R&B Vocal Performance	Nominated
1983	Forever, For Always, For Love	Best Male R&B Vocal Performance	Nominated
1986	The Night I Fell in Love	Best Male R&B Vocal Performance	Nominated
1987	"Give Me the Reason"	Best Male R&B Vocal Performance	Nominated
1987	"Give Me the Reason"	Best R&B Song (shared with Nat Adderley Jr.)	Nominated
1989	"Any Love"	Best Male R&B Vocal Performance	Nominated
1989	"Any Love"	Best R&B Song (shared with Marcus Miller)	Nominated
1990	"She Won't Talk to Me"	Best Male R&B Vocal Performance	Nominated
1991	"Here and Now"	Best Male R&B Vocal Performance	Won
1992	"Power of Love/Love Power"	Best Male R&B Vocal Performance	Won
1992	"Power of Love/Love Power"	Best R&B Song (with Marcus Miller and Teddy Vann)	Won
1992	"Doctor's Orders" (with Aretha Franklin)	Best R&B Performance by a Duo or Group with Vocals	Nominated
1993	"The Best Things in Life Are Free" (with Janet Jackson)	Best R&B Performance by a Duo or Group with Vocals	Nominated
1994	"How Deep Is Your Love"	Best Male R&B Vocal Performance	Nominated
1994	"Heaven Knows"	Best R&B Song (shared with Reed Vertelney)	Nominated
1994	"Little Miracles (Happen Every Day)"	Best R&B Song (shared with Marcus Miller)	Nominated
1995	"Love the One You're With"	Best Male Pop Vocal Performance	Nominated
1995	"Endless Love" (with Mariah Carey)	Best Pop Collaboration with Vocals	Nominated
1995	"Always and Forever"	Best Male R&B Vocal Performance	Nominated
1995	Songs	Best R&B Album	Nominated
1997	"Your Secret Love"	Best Male R&B Vocal Performance	Won
1997	"Your Secret Love"	Best R&B Song (shared with Reed Vertelney)	Nominated
1998	"When You Call on Me / Baby That's When I Come Runnin'"	Best Male R&B Vocal Performance	Nominated
1999	"I Know"	Best Male R&B Vocal Performance	Nominated
1999	I Know	Best Traditional R&B Performance	Nominated
2003	"Any Day Now"	Best Traditional R&B Performance	Nominated
2004	"Dance with My Father"	Song of the Year (shared with Richard Marx)	Won
2004	"Dance with My Father"	Best Male R&B Vocal Performance	Won
2004	"Dance with My Father"	Best R&B Song (shared with Richard Marx)	Nominated
2004	"The Closer I Get to You" (with Beyoncé)	Best R&B Performance by a Duo or Group with Vocals	Won
2004	Dance with My Father	Best R&B Album	Won
2007	"Got You Home"	Best Male R&B Vocal Performance	Nominated

Soul Train Music Awards

Year	Nominee / work	Award	Result
1987	Give Me the Reason	Best R&B/Soul Album – Male	Won
1987	"Give Me the Reason"	Best R&B/Soul Single – Male	Nominated
1988	"So Amazing"	Best R&B/Soul Single – Male	Nominated
1989	Any Love	Best R&B/Soul Album – Male	Nominated
1990	The Best of Luther Vandross... The Best of Love	Best R&B/Soul Album – Male	Nominated
1990	"Here and Now"	Best R&B/Soul Single – Male	Won
1990	"Here and Now"	Best Song of the Year	Nominated
1992	Power of Love	Best R&B/Soul Album – Male	Won
1992	"Power of Love/Love Power"	Best R&B/Soul Single – Male	Nominated
1994	Never Let Me Go	Best R&B/Soul Album – Male	Nominated
1994	"Heaven Knows"	Best R&B/Soul Single – Male	Nominated
1995	Songs	Best R&B/Soul Album – Male	Nominated
1999	Luther Vandross	Quincy Jones Award for Career Achievement	Honored
2004	Dance with My Father	Best Album of the Year	Nominated
2004	Dance with My Father	Best R&B/Soul Album – Male	Nominated
2004	"Dance with My Father"	Best R&B/Soul Single – Male	Won
2005	"The Closer I Get to You" (with Beyoncé)	Best R&B/Soul Single – Group, Band or Duo	Nominated

American Music Awards

Year	Nominee / work	Award	Result
1986	Luther Vandross	Favorite Soul/R&B Male Artist	Nominated
1986	The Night I Fell in Love	Favorite Soul/R&B Album	Nominated
1988	Luther Vandross	Favorite Soul/R&B Male Artist	Won
1988	Give Me the Reason	Favorite Soul/R&B Album	Nominated
1990	Luther Vandross	Favorite Soul/R&B Male Artist	Won
1992	Luther Vandross	Favorite Soul/R&B Male Artist	Won
1992	Power of Love	Favorite Soul/R&B Album	Won
1994	Luther Vandross	Favorite Soul/R&B Male Artist	Won
1996	Luther Vandross	Favorite Soul/R&B Male Artist	Won
2002	Luther Vandross	Favorite Soul/R&B Male Artist	Won
2003	Luther Vandross	Favorite Soul/R&B Male Artist	Won
2003	Dance with My Father	Favorite Soul/R&B Album	Won

Hollywood Walk of Fame

Year	Nominee / work	Award	Result
2014	Luther Vandross	Hollywood Walk of Fame	Inducted

National Rhythm & Blues Hall of Fame

Year	Nominee / work	Award	Result
2021	Luther Vandross	Rhythm and Blues Music Hall of Fame	Inducted

Grammy Hall of Fame

Year	Nominee / work	Award	Result
2025	Never Too Much	Grammy Hall of Fame	Inducted

Rock and Roll Hall of Fame

Year	Nominee / work	Award	Result
2026	Luther Vandross	Rock and Roll Hall of Fame	Inducted

== See also ==
- List of quiet storm songs
- Luther Burger
- Craig Seymour
- Bronx Walk of Fame
- Luther: Never Too Much
