= Jason Miles =

- Born: June 30, 1951 (age 75); New York City, U.S.
- Genres: Jazz, jazz fusion
- Occupations: Musician, composer, record producer
- Instrument: Keyboards
- Years active: 1974–present
- Labels: Lipstick, Telarc, Narada, Shanachie, Whaling City Sound
- Website: jasonmilesmusic.com

Jason Miles (born June 30, 1951) is an American jazz keyboardist, composer, and record producer. Throughout his career, he has worked with trumpeter Miles Davis, bassist Marcus Miller, and singer Luther Vandross, as well as maintaining a successful solo career.

== Career ==
Miles was born in Brooklyn, New York City, and went to Indiana State University. When jazz fusion was becoming popular in the 1970s, Miles was in New York creating innovative techniques in synthesizer programming and electronic music. He recorded Cozmopolitan (1979), his first album, with Michael Brecker and Marcus Miller, although it wasn't released. During the 1980s he was a session musician who worked with Miles Davis, Aretha Franklin, Whitney Houston, Michael Jackson, Chaka Khan, Diana Ross, David Sanborn, and Luther Vandross.

During the 1990s, he played keyboards on I'm Your Baby Tonight by Whitney Houston, The Power of Love by Luther Vandross, and HIStory by Michael Jackson. He wrote music for the animated film The Snow Queen and People: A Musical Celebration of Diversity on the Disney Channel. He and his wife Kathy Byalick composed Visionary Path, a New Age album with narration by Diana Krall, Roberta Flack, and F. Murray Abraham.

In 2000 Miles released The Music of Weather Report, the first of several tribute albums. During the next year he won a Grammy Award for producing A Love Affair: The Music of Ivan Lins with appearances by Sting and Brenda Russell. His next solo album To Grover, with Love, was a tribute to Grover Washington Jr. that was nominated for Record of the Year by the National Smooth Jazz Awards. He also recorded tributes to Miles Davis and Marvin Gaye.

== Discography ==
- World Tour (Lipstick LIP-89021, 1994)
- Mr. X (Lightyear 54170, 1996)
- Visionary Path: Guided Journeys for the Mind and Spirit (Prophesy 4042, 1997)
- Celebrating the Music of Weather Report (Telarc 83473, 2000)
- A Love Affair: The Music of Ivan Lins (Telarc 83496, 2000)
- To Grover, with Love [a tribute to Grover Washington Jr.] (Q Records 92945, 2001; ARTizen 10014, 2006)
- Brazilian Nights: Rio Wave (Q Records 92961, 2002; Turn Up the Music 1051, 2005) - with Romero Lubambo
- Cozmopolitan (Turn Up the Music 1053, 2005) rec. 1979
- Miles to Miles: In the Spirit of Miles Davis (Narada Jazz 78136, 2005)
- What's Going On? Songs of Marvin Gaye (Narada Jazz 33338, 2006)
- Global Noize (Shanachie 5160, 2008) - with DJ Logic
- Soul Summit: Live at the Berks Jazz Fest! (Shanachie 5770, 2008)
- 2 Grover with Love (Koch KOC-4536, 2008)
- A Prayer for the Planet (Art of Groove/MIG 80132, 2011) - with 'Global Noize'
- Kind of New (Whaling City Sound WCS-073, 2015) - with Ingrid Jensen
- To Grover with Love: Live in Japan (Whaling City Sound WCS-078, 2016) rec. 2010
- Kind of New 2: Blue is Paris (Lightyear, 2017)
- Black Magic (Ropeadope RAD-529, 2020) - with 'Kind of New'
- The Artistry and Volume of Efrayim Fischbacher ( Regal, 2022)'
- 100 Miles for Miles Davis (digital album or limited CD edition on Bandcamp, 1 Mai 2026)
