= Billboard Year-End Hot Black Singles of 1982 =

American music chart

This is a list of Billboard magazine's Top Hot Black Singles of 1982.

| No. | Title | Artist(s) |
|---|---|---|
| 1 | "That Girl" | Stevie Wonder |
| 2 | "Let's Groove" | Earth, Wind & Fire |
| 3 | "Let It Whip" | The Dazz Band |
| 4 | "Love Come Down" | Evelyn King |
| 5 | "Jump to It" | Aretha Franklin |
| 6 | "And I Am Telling You I'm Not Going" | Jennifer Holliday |
| 7 | "Early in the Morning" | The Gap Band |
| 8 | "Call Me" | Skyy |
| 9 | "If It Ain't One Thing, It's Another" | Richard "Dimples" Fields |
| 10 | "I Really Don't Need No Light" | Jeffrey Osborne |
| 11 | "Forget Me Nots" | Patrice Rushen |
| 12 | "It's Gonna Take a Miracle" | Deniece Williams |
| 13 | "Dance Floor" | Zapp |
| 14 | "Street Corner" | Ashford & Simpson |
| 15 | "We Go a Long Way Back" | Bloodstone |
| 16 | "Turn Your Love Around" | George Benson |
| 17 | "The Other Woman" | Ray Parker Jr. |
| 18 | "Let the Feeling Flow" | Peabo Bryson |
| 19 | "One Hundred Ways" | Quincy Jones featuring James Ingram |
| 20 | "Take My Heart (You Can Have It If You Want It)" | Kool & the Gang |
| 21 | "Circles" | Atlantic Starr |
| 22 | "Do I Do" | Stevie Wonder |
| 23 | "Let Me Go" | Ray Parker Jr. |
| 24 | "Tell Me Tomorrow" | Smokey Robinson |
| 25 | "Hit and Run" | Bar-Kays |
| 26 | "Mama Used to Say" | Junior |
| 27 | "Love Is in Control (Finger on the Trigger)" | Donna Summer |
| 28 | "Ebony and Ivory" | Paul McCartney featuring Stevie Wonder |
| 29 | "I Heard It Through the Grapevine" | Roger Troutman |
| 30 | "I Want to Hold Your Hand" | Lakeside |
| 31 | "Too Late" | Junior |
| 32 | "Dance wit' Me" | Rick James |
| 33 | "Planet Rock" | Afrika Bambaataa and the Soulsonic Force |
| 34 | "If You Think You're Lonely Now" | Bobby Womack |
| 35 | "I Can't Go for That (No Can Do)" | Daryl Hall & John Oates |
| 36 | "Standing on the Top" | The Temptations featuring Rick James |
| 37 | "Cutie Pie" | One Way |
| 38 | "You're My Latest, My Greatest Inspiration" | Teddy Pendergrass |
| 39 | "Cool" | The Time |
| 40 | "So Fine" | Howard Johnson |
| 41 | "Make Up Your Mind" | Aurra |
| 42 | "Genius of Love" | Tom Tom Club |
| 43 | "Why Do Fools Fall in Love" | Diana Ross |
| 44 | "Controversy" | Prince |
| 45 | "Let Me Tickle Your Fancy" | Jermaine Jackson |
| 46 | "Murphy's Law" | Chéri |
| 47 | "The Gigolo" | O'Bryan |
| 48 | "The Message" | Grandmaster Flash and the Furious Five |
| 49 | "Just Be Yourself" | Cameo |
| 50 | "Cheating in the Next Room" | Z. Z. Hill |

== See also ==
- 1982 in music
- Billboard Year-End Hot 100 singles of 1982
- List of Hot Soul Singles number ones of 1982
