= List of Luther Vandross concert tours =

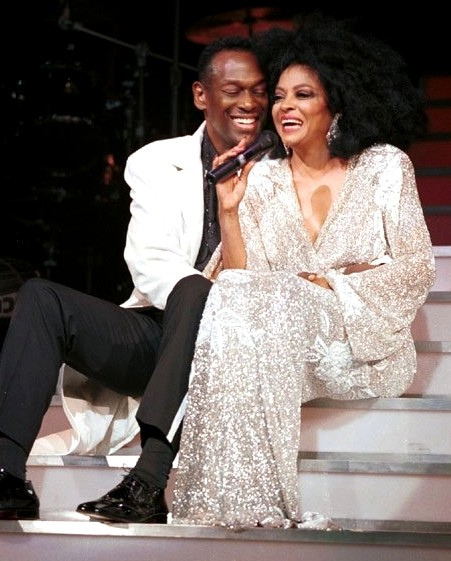
Vandross performing with Diana Ross in New York in July 2000

This is a list of Luther Vandross concert tours. Luther Vandross was an American singer, songwriter and record producer. Throughout his career, Vandross was an in demand background vocalist for several different artists including Chaka Khan, Bette Midler, Diana Ross, David Bowie, Barbra Streisand, and Donna Summer. He later became the lead singer of the group Change which released its certified gold debut album, The Glow of Love, in 1980 on Warner Bros. Records. After Vandross left the group, he was signed to Epic Records as a solo artist and released his debut solo album, Never Too Much in 1981. During his career, Vandross sold over 40 million records worldwide and received eight Grammy Awards.

== Concert tours ==
1980s

- Luther Tour (1981) – Vandross scored his first US No. 1 R&B single "Never Too Much", served as a supporting act for several music artists. After the second single "Don't You Know That?" hit the US R&B top ten, Vandross headlined his first national tour to promote his debut 'platinum' hit album, Never Too Much released in August 1981.
- Forever, for Always, for Love Tour (1982) – This tour was the first major headlining world tour by Vandross, supporting his second platinum-certified album Forever, for Always, for Love. The outing spanned over a year, starting on February 14, in Boston, Massachusetts, visiting several cities across the U.S. and Europe from 1982 to the summer of 1983.
- Busy Body Tour (1984) – Occurred in support of his gold-certified album Busy Body. Following the album release and its first single, "I'll Let You Slide", Vandross kicked off the four-month U.S. tour in early January, visiting several cities across the U.S. to late April. The tour resumed for a second outing with additional dates throughout the summer.
- The Night I Fell in Love Tour (1985) – This tour supported his hit album, The Night I Fell in Love. The U.S. outing started on March 1, 1985, that included dates to late-August 1986, with multiple dates in select cities.
- Give Me the Reason Tour (1987) – This tour supported his platinum-certified album, Give Me the Reason. The U.S. trek started in January 1987 that included dates scheduled for October; with multiple dates in select cities across North America and overseas in Europe.
- The Heat: Luther & Anita Live! (1988) – The trek started on September 28, in Washington, D.C., with singer Anita Baker joining as co-headliner.
- Any Love World Tour (1989) – Held in support of his platinum-certified album Any Love. Following its release, debuting in the top ten pop album charts, Vandross kicked off a three-month tour in the U.S.

1990s

- Power of Love Tour (1991–1992) – This tour supported his hit album, Power of Love. The four-month outing started in Hampton, Virginia on September 11, 1991, to January 1992, visiting 55 cities across North America. The itinerary included four sold-out shows in New York City at Madison Square Garden, and three sold-out shows at the Rosemont Horizon in Chicago, Illinois.
- Never Let Me Go Tour (1993–1994) – This tour supported his platinum-certified album, Never Let Me Go. The five-month tour started on September 8, in Houston, Texas to November 18, in Hershey, Pennsylvania, also visiting Europe in late November.
- An Evening of Songs Tour (January–March 1995)
- Your Secret Love Tour (1997) – Held in support of his album, Your Secret Love. The 1997 U.S. outing started in January to late-March. The second leg U.S. outing resumed in September, and featured co-headliner singer-actress Vanessa Williams; billed as Luther & Vanessa Live! Vandross toured Europe and South Africa from late October to mid-November.

2000s

- Take You Out Tour (2001–2002) – Held in support of his platinum-certified album Luther Vandross. Vandross kicked off the U.S. tour in May, visiting several cities across the U.S. to late-December 2001. The U.S. tour resumed in spring of 2002 with dates scheduled to September, and a European tour in November.
- BK Got Music Summer Soul Tour (2002) – a co-headlining summer concert tour in 2002 by Vandross, Gerald Levert and Angie Stone; and featured special guest Michelle Williams. The tour kicked off on August 15, in Boston, MA, visiting 19 cities across North America. The tour would be Vandross’s final outing throughout his music career before his death in 2005.
- Luther Live! (2003) – Vandross performed two sold-out shows on February 11 and 12 at Radio City Music Hall in New York City. A live album was released in October 2003, titled Live: Radio City Music Hall.
