= List of Billboard number-one R&B albums of 1982 =

These are the Billboard magazine R&B singles chart number one hits of 1982:

== Chart history ==
| Issue date | Album | Artist |
|---|---|---|
| January 2 | Raise! | Earth, Wind and Fire |
| January 9 | Raise! | Earth, Wind and Fire |
| January 16 | Raise! | Earth, Wind and Fire |
| January 23 | Raise! | Earth, Wind and Fire |
| January 30 | Raise! | Earth, Wind and Fire |
| February 6 | Skyy Line | Skyy |
| February 13 | Skyy Line | Skyy |
| February 20 | The Poet | Bobby Womack |
| February 27 | The Poet | Bobby Womack |
| March 6 | The Poet | Bobby Womack |
| March 13 | The Poet | Bobby Womack |
| March 20 | The Poet | Bobby Womack |
| March 27 | Skyy Line | Skyy |
| April 3 | Skyy Line | Skyy |
| April 10 | Skyy Line | Skyy |
| April 17 | Love Is Where You Find It | The Whispers |
| April 24 | Friends | Shalamar |
| May 1 | Friends | Shalamar |
| May 8 | Brilliance | Atlantic Starr |
| May 15 | Brilliance | Atlantic Starr |
| May 22 | Brilliance | Atlantic Starr |
| May 29 | The Other Woman | Ray Parker Jr. |
| June 5 | Stevie Wonder's Original Musiquarium I | Stevie Wonder |
| June 12 | Stevie Wonder's Original Musiquarium I | Stevie Wonder |
| June 19 | Keep It Live | Dazz Band |
| June 26 | Stevie Wonder's Original Musiquarium I | Stevie Wonder |
| July 3 | Gap Band IV | The Gap Band |
| July 10 | Gap Band IV | The Gap Band |
| July 17 | Gap Band IV | The Gap Band |
| July 24 | Gap Band IV | The Gap Band |
| July 31 | Gap Band IV | The Gap Band |
| August 7 | Gap Band IV | The Gap Band |
| August 14 | Gap Band IV | The Gap Band |
| August 21 | Gap Band IV | The Gap Band |
| August 28 | Gap Band IV | The Gap Band |
| September 4 | Jump to It | Aretha Franklin |
| September 11 | Jump to It | Aretha Franklin |
| September 18 | Jump to It | Aretha Franklin |
| September 25 | Jump to It | Aretha Franklin |
| October 2 | Jump to It | Aretha Franklin |
| October 9 | Jump to It | Aretha Franklin |
| October 16 | Jump to It | Aretha Franklin |
| October 23 | Get Loose | Evelyn "Champagne" King |
| October 30 | Get Loose | Evelyn "Champagne" King |
| November 6 | Forever, For Always, For Love | Luther Vandross |
| November 13 | Forever, For Always, For Love | Luther Vandross |
| November 20 | Forever, For Always, For Love | Luther Vandross |
| November 27 | Lionel Richie | Lionel Richie |
| December 4 | Midnight Love | Marvin Gaye |
| December 11 | Midnight Love | Marvin Gaye |
| December 18 | Midnight Love | Marvin Gaye |
| December 25 | Midnight Love | Marvin Gaye |

== See also ==
- 1982 in music
- R&B number-one hits of 1982 (USA)
