= Start of a Romance =

Start of a Romance may refer to:

- "Start of a Romance" (song), a 1989 single by Skyy
- Start of a Romance (album), a 1989 album by Skyy
