= How Many Times Can We Say Goodbye =

Studio album by Dionne Warwick
- Released: September 29, 1983
- Recorded: 1983
- Studio: Record Plant (Los Angeles, California); Mediasound Studios (New York City, New York)
- Genre: R&B
- Length: 35:36
- Label: Arista
- Producer: Luther Vandross

Dionne Warwick chronology
Heartbreaker (1982)	How Many Times Can We Say Goodbye (1983)	The Woman in Red (1984)

Singles from How Many Times Can We Say Goodbye
- 1. "How Many Times Can We Say Goodbye" Released: September 1983; 2. "Got a Date" Released: January 1984

Professional ratings
Review scores
Source	Rating
AllMusic	4/5 stars
The Rolling Stone Album Guide	2.5/5 stars

How Many Times Can We Say Goodbye is a studio album by the American singer Dionne Warwick. It was released by Arista Records on September 29, 1983, in the United States. Recorded during the spring of 1983, Warwick worked with the singer and songwriter Luther Vandross, who also appears on the hit title track. The album includes the original version of the song "So Amazing", which Vandross would record later for his Give Me the Reason album, and a remake of The Shirelles' 1960 hit "Will You Still Love Me Tomorrow", featuring the original group on guest vocals.

Despite strong reviews, How Many Times Can We Say Goodbye failed to reprise the commercial success of its predecessor Heartbreaker (1982) and became a commercial disappointment, stalling at number 57 on the US Billboard 200. Lead single "How Many Times Can We Say Goodbye" hit number 4 on the Adult Contemporary chart and number 27 on the Billboard Hot 100, while the upbeat "Got a Date" peaked at number 45 on the Hot R&B/Hip-Hop Songs chart and number 15 on the Dance Club Songs charts.

== Track listing ==
All tracks produced by Luther Vandross.

Side one
No.	Title	Writer(s)	Length
1.	"Got a Date"	Vandross; Marcus Miller	5:17
2.	"So Amazing"	Vandross	3:43
3.	"I Do It 'Cause I Like It"	Vandross; Miller	5:00
4.	"How Many Times Can We Say Goodbye" (duet with Luther Vandross)	Steve Goldman	3:27

Side two
No.	Title	Writer(s)	Length
5.	"What Can a Miracle Do"	Vandross; Don Grolnick	4:39
6.	"Two Ships Passing in the Night"	Dionne Warwick	5:11
7.	"I Can Let Go Now"	Michael McDonald	2:53
8.	"Will You Still Love Me Tomorrow" (featuring The Shirelles)	Carole King; Gerry Goffin	5:26

2014 re-issue bonus tracks
No.	Title	Writer(s)	Length
9.	"Got a Date" (7” Version)	Vandross; Miller	4:10
10.	"Got a Date" (Special Remix)	Vandross; Miller	6:59
11.	"Got a Date" (Instrumental)	Vandross; Miller	4:56
12.	"Got a Date" (Single Version)	Vandross; Miller	3:29
13.	"Two Ships Passing in the Night" (Instrumental)	Warwick	5:01
14.	"How Many Times Can We Say Goodbye" (Instrumental)	Goldman	3:28

== Personnel and credits ==
Musicians

- Dionne Warwick – vocals, backing vocals (2, 6)
- Nat Adderley Jr. – keyboards
- Cliff Branch – clavinet (1)
- Marcus Miller – synthesizers (1, 3), bass guitar (1–5, 8)
- Skip Anderson – synthesizers (2, 4, 5, 7)
- Doc Powell – guitars (1–5, 8)
- Georg Wadenius – guitars (1–5, 8)
- Peter Frampton – guitar solo (1, 3)
- Paul Jackson Jr. – guitars (6)
- Abraham Laboriel – bass guitar (6)
- Yogi Horton – drums (1–5, 7, 8)
- Carlos Vega – drums (6)
- Sammy Figueroa – congas (1, 3)
- Paulinho da Costa – percussion (1, 3–5, 7, 8)
- Tawatha Agee – backing vocals (1, 3)
- Patti Austin – backing vocals (1, 4)
- Phillip Ballou – backing vocals (1, 4)
- Cissy Houston – backing vocals (1, 4)
- Yvonne Lewis – backing vocals (1, 2, 4)
- Fonzi Thornton – backing vocals (1)
- Luther Vandross – backing vocals (1, 2, 4), vocals (4)
- Brenda White – backing vocals (1, 3, 4)
- Damaris Carbaugh – backing vocals (2)
- Lani Groves – backing vocals (2)
- Louise Bethune – backing vocals (3)
- Michelle Cobbs – backing vocals (3, 4)
- Diana Graselli – backing vocals (3)
- Alfa Anderson – backing vocals (4)
- The Shirelles – backing vocals (8)

Music arrangements

- Marcus Miller – rhythm and synthesizer arrangements (1)
- Luther Vandross – vocal arrangements (1–3), rhythm arrangements (2)
- Nat Adderley Jr. – rhythm arrangements (2, 4–6, 8), synthesizer arrangements (4–7), horn and string arrangements (6)
- Paul Riser – horn and string arrangements (2, 7)
- Jimmy Webb – horn and string arrangements (4, 8)
- Leon Pendarvis – horn and string arrangements (5)

Production

- Luther Vandross – producer, mixing
- Marcus Miller – mixing
- Ray Bardani – mixing, engineer
- Carl Beatty – engineer
- Michael H. Brauer – engineer
- Michael Christopher – engineer, assistant engineer
- Doug Epstein – engineer
- Bill Stein – engineer
- Mark Cobrin – assistant engineer
- Scott Mabuchi – assistant engineer
- Jim Scott – assistant engineer
- Harry Spiridakis – assistant engineer
- Greg Calbi – mastering at Sterling Sound (New York, NY)
- Donn Davenport – art direction
- Frank Laffitte – photography
- Clifford Peterson – hair
- Wynona Price – make-up
- Lisa Daurio – stylist
- G.M.I. – management

== Charts ==
Chart performance for How Many Times Can We Say Goodbye
Chart (1983)	Peak position
Swedish Albums (Sverigetopplistan)	46
UK Albums (Official Charts)	60
US Top LPs & Tape (Billboard)	57
US Black LPs (Billboard)	19
US Top 100 Albums (Cash Box)	77
US Top 75 Black Contemporary Albums (Cash Box)	16
