= If Only for One Night =

Single by Luther Vandross

from the album The Night I Fell in Love
- Released: 1985
- Genre: R&B; soul
- Length: 4:15
- Label: Epic
- Songwriter: Brenda Russell
- Producer: Luther Vandross

Luther Vandross singles chronology
"Wait for Love" (1985)	"If Only for One Night" (1985)	"Give Me the Reason" (1986)

"If Only for One Night" is a song written and originally performed by American singer-songwriter Brenda Russell on her self-titled debut studio album in 1979. In 1988, in Europe, it was issued as the B-side of her single "Gravity".

The song was covered by Luther Vandross in 1985 for his fourth studio album, The Night I Fell in Love, and was also released as a single. Vandross has performed the song on several concert tours, including his The Night I Fell in Love Tour (1985–86).

Other covers were recorded by Roberta Flack and Peabo Bryson on their collaborative album Live & More (1980), by Marilyn McCoo in her role as Tamara Price on a 1986 episode of the soap opera Days Of Our Lives, by Babyface on the tribute album So Amazing: An All-Star Tribute to Luther Vandross (2005), by Marcus Miller on his album Silver Rain (2005) and by Ruben Studdard on his album The Return (2006).

In 2005 the song was sampled on the single "Let Me Hold You" by Bow Wow featuring Omarion, which reached the number four on the Billboard Hot 100. In 2015 the song was also sampled by Tamar Braxton on the track "I Love You" from her fourth studio album, Calling All Lovers. Elements of the song were also sampled one the track "Do It 2 Me" by Janet Jackson, from her 2006 album "20 Y.O.".
