= How Many Times Can We Say Goodbye (song) =

Single by Dionne Warwick and Luther Vandross

from the album How Many Times Can We Say Goodbye and Busy Body
- B-side: "What Can a Miracle Do"
- Released: September 1983 (US)
- Recorded: 1983
- Genre: R&B
- Length: 3:27
- Label: Arista Records AS 1-9073
- Songwriter: Steve Goldman
- Producer: Luther Vandross

Dionne Warwick singles chronology
"All the Love in the World" (June 1983)	"How Many Times Can We Say Goodbye" (Sept 1983)	"Got A Date" (Jan 1984)

Luther Vandross singles chronology
"Since I Lost My Baby" (Jan 1983)	"How Many Times Can We Say Goodbye" (Sept 1983)	"I'll Let You Slide" (Dec 1983)

"How Many Times Can We Say Goodbye" is a 1983 song by Dionne Warwick and Luther Vandross. The ballad was issued as the lead single of Warwick's album How Many Times Can We Say Goodbye, later appearing on Vandross' album Busy Body, both of which were released in 1983.

The single was a top ten hit on both Billboard's Hot Black Singles chart and Billboard's Adult Contemporary Chart, also reaching number 27 on the Billboard Hot 100 and number 36 on the Cash Box Top 100, becoming Luther Vandross' highest charting pop hit at the time until 1986.

== Track listing ==
US Vinyl 7-inch single 45 RPM

- A "How Many Times Can We Say Goodbye" (Dionne Warwick and Luther Vandross) – 3:27
- B "What Can a Miracle Do" (Dionne Warwick) – 4:39

== Personnel ==
- Dionne Warwick – lead vocals
- Luther Vandross – lead and background vocals, vocal arrangement
- Yogi Horton – drums
- Marcus Miller – bass
- Nat Adderley Jr. – keyboards, rhythm arrangement, synthesizer arrangement
- John "Skip" Anderson – synthesizers
- Georg Wadenius, Doc Powell – guitars
- Steve Kroon – congas
- Paulinho da Costa – percussion
- Cissy Houston, Yvonne Lewis, Patti Austin, Alfa Anderson, Michelle Cobbs, Brenda White, Phillip Ballou – background vocals

== Charts ==
Chart (1983)	Peak position
US Adult Contemporary (Billboard)	4
US Billboard Hot 100	27
US Hot R&B/Hip-Hop Songs (Billboard)	7
US Cash Box Top 100	36
UK Singles (Official Charts)	99
Canada Adult Contemporary (RPM)	5
