= So Amazing: An All-Star Tribute to Luther Vandross =

Compilation album by various artists
- Released: September 20, 2005
- Recorded: 2005
- Genres: R&B; soul
- Length: 72:18
- Label: J
- Producers: Babyface; Kerry "Krucial" Brothers; Jerry "Wonder" Duplessis; Hani; Wyclef Jean; Jimmy Jam and Terry Lewis; Alicia Keys; Arif Mardin; Gregg Pagani; Usher Raymond IV; Raphael Saadiq; Dave Tozer; The Underdogs

Professional ratings
Review scores
| Source | Rating |
|---|---|
| The Advocate | Average |
| AllMusic | 3.5/5 stars |
| Billboard | Positive |
| Los Angeles Times | 2/4 stars |
| Stylus Magazine | C |

So Amazing: An All-Star Tribute to Luther Vandross is a tribute album to American singer Luther Vandross, released on September 20, 2005, by J Records, nearly three months after Vandross' death. It consists of cover versions of past songs by Vandross, recorded by R&B, soul, and pop artists. The album debuted at number four on the US Billboard 200 and at number one on the US Top R&B/Hip-Hop Albums chart, selling 104,000 copies in its opening week.

== Track listing ==
| No. | Title | Writer(s) | Producer(s) | Length |
|---|---|---|---|---|
| 1. | "Never Too Much" (performed by Mary J. Blige) | Luther Vandross | Jimmy Jam and Terry Lewis; Big Jim Wright^{[a]} | 5:15 |
| 2. | "Superstar" (performed by Usher) | Bonnie Bramlett; Delaney Bramlett; Leon Russell | Usher Raymond IV; J-Lack^{[a]} | 5:55 |
| 3. | "'Til My Baby Comes Home" (performed by Fantasia) | Vandross; Marcus Miller | Jimmy Jam and Terry Lewis; B.J. Wright^{[a]} | 4:38 |
| 4. | "So Amazing" (performed by Beyoncé and Stevie Wonder) | Vandross; Benjamin Wright | Raphael Saadiq; Jake and the Phatman^{[a]}; Beyoncé Knowles^{[b]} | 4:11 |
| 5. | "A House Is Not a Home" (performed by Aretha Franklin) | Burt Bacharach; Hal David | Arif Mardin | 5:30 |
| 6. | "Power of Love" (performed by Donna Summer) | Vandross; Miller | Hani; The Underdogs^{[b]} | 3:29 |
| 7. | "If This World Were Mine" (performed by Alicia Keys featuring Jermaine Paul) | Marvin Gaye | Kerry "Krucial" Brothers; Keys | 4:56 |
| 8. | "Anyone Who Had a Heart" (performed by Elton John and Luther Vandross) | Bacharach; David | The Underdogs | 4:50 |
| 9. | "Dance with My Father" (performed by Celine Dion) | Vandross; Richard Marx | Jimmy Jam and Terry Lewis; B.J. Wright^{[a]} | 4:38 |
| 10. | "Always & Forever" (performed by Wyclef Jean) | Rodney Temperton | Jean; Jerry "Wonder" Duplessis | 4:35 |
| 11. | "If Only for One Night" (performed by Babyface) | Brenda Russell | Babyface; Gregg Pagani | 4:23 |
| 12. | "Here & Now" (performed by Patti LaBelle) | David Elliott; Terry Steele | The Underdogs | 4:29 |
| 13. | "Love Won't Let Me Wait" (performed by John Legend) | Vinnie Barrett; Bobby Eli | Dave Tozer | 3:55 |
| 14. | "Since I Lost My Baby" (performed by Angie Stone) | Warren Moore; Smokey Robinson | Jimmy Jam and Terry Lewis; B.J. Wright^{[a]} | 5:23 |
| 15. | "Creepin'" (performed by Jamie Foxx) | Wonder | The Underdogs | 6:11 |

=== Notes ===
- ^{^[a]} signifies a co-producer
- ^{^[b]} signifies a vocal producer

== Charts ==
=== Weekly charts ===
Weekly chart performance for So Amazing: An All-Star Tribute to Luther Vandross
| Chart (2005) | Peak position |
|---|---|
| UK Compilation Albums (Official Charts) | 25 |
| UK R&B Albums (Official Charts) | 10 |
| US Billboard 200 | 4 |
| US Compilation Albums (Billboard) | 1 |
| US Top R&B/Hip-Hop Albums (Billboard) | 1 |

=== Year-end charts ===
Year-end chart performance for So Amazing: An All-Star Tribute to Luther Vandross
| Chart (2005) | Position |
|---|---|
| US Top R&B/Hip-Hop Albums (Billboard) | 100 |

== Awards and nominations ==
| Year | Award | Category | Nominated work | Result |
|---|---|---|---|---|
| 2006 | Grammy Awards | Best Male R&B Vocal Performance | "Creepin'" | Nominated |
| 2006 | Grammy Awards | Best Male R&B Vocal Performance | "Superstar" | Nominated |
| 2006 | Grammy Awards | Best R&B Performance by a Duo or Group with Vocals | "So Amazing" | Won |
| 2006 | Grammy Awards | Best R&B Performance by a Duo or Group with Vocals | "If This World Were Mine" | Nominated |
| 2006 | Grammy Awards | Best Traditional R&B Vocal Performance | "A House Is Not a Home" | Won |
| 2006 | NAACP Image Awards | Outstanding Album | So Amazing: An All-Star Tribute to Luther Vandross | Nominated |
