= Sun Won't Shine =

Sun Won't Shine may refer to:

- "Sun Won't Shine", a song by Sentenced from the album Down
- "Sun Won't Shine", a song by Skyy from the album Skyyport
- "The Sun Won't Shine", a song by Angelfish from their self-titled album
- "The Sun Won't Shine", a song by Katrina and the Waves from their self-titled album
