= List of European number-one hits of 1984 =

This is a list of the European Hot 100 Singles and European Top 100 Albums number ones of 1984, as published by Eurotipsheet magazine (renamed Music & Media in April 1986).

== Chart history ==
Issue date	Song	Artist	Album	Artist	Ref.
19 March	"Relax"	Frankie Goes to Hollywood	Thriller	Michael Jackson	
26 March	No chart published				
2 April	No chart published				
9 April	"Street Dance"	Break Machine	Thriller	Michael Jackson	
16 April	"Relax"	Frankie Goes to Hollywood	Thriller	Michael Jackson	
23 April	"Street Dance"	Break Machine	Thriller	Michael Jackson	
30 April	"Relax"	Frankie Goes to Hollywood	Thriller	Michael Jackson	
7 May	"Relax"	Frankie Goes to Hollywood	Thriller	Michael Jackson	
14 May	"Relax"	Frankie Goes to Hollywood	Thriller	Michael Jackson	
21 May	"Relax"	Frankie Goes to Hollywood	Thriller	Michael Jackson	
28 May	"Relax"	Frankie Goes to Hollywood	Thriller	Michael Jackson	
4 June	"Against All Odds (Take a Look at Me Now)"	Phil Collins	Thriller	Michael Jackson	
11 June	"Relax"	Frankie Goes to Hollywood	Thriller	Michael Jackson	
18 June	"Relax"	Frankie Goes to Hollywood	Thriller	Michael Jackson	
25 June	"Relax"	Frankie Goes to Hollywood	Thriller	Michael Jackson	
2 July	"Relax"	Frankie Goes to Hollywood	Thriller	Michael Jackson	
9 July	"Relax"	Frankie Goes to Hollywood	Thriller	Michael Jackson	
16 July (Note: The issue dated 23 July 1984 was a double issue.)	"Self Control"	Laura Branigan	Thriller	Michael Jackson	
23 July	"Self Control"	Laura Branigan	Thriller	Michael Jackson	
30 July	"Self Control"	Laura Branigan	Thriller	Michael Jackson	
6 August (Note: The issue dated 13 August 1984 was a double issue.)	"Self Control"	Laura Branigan	Thriller	Michael Jackson	
13 August	"Self Control"	Laura Branigan	Thriller	Michael Jackson	
20 August (Note: The issue dated 27 August 1984 was a double issue.)	"Self Control"	Laura Branigan	Thriller	Michael Jackson	
27 August	"Self Control"	Laura Branigan	Thriller	Michael Jackson	
3 September	"Self Control"	Laura Branigan	Discovery	Mike Oldfield	
10 September	"Self Control"	Laura Branigan	Discovery	Mike Oldfield	
17 September	"Self Control"	Laura Branigan	Discovery	Mike Oldfield	
24 September	"Self Control"	Laura Branigan	Discovery	Mike Oldfield	
1 October	"I Just Called to Say I Love You"	Stevie Wonder	Victory	The Jacksons	
8 October	"I Just Called to Say I Love You"	Stevie Wonder	Discovery	Mike Oldfield	
15 October	"I Just Called to Say I Love You"	Stevie Wonder	Powerslave	Iron Maiden	
22 October	"I Just Called to Say I Love You"	Stevie Wonder	The Woman in Red	Stevie Wonder	
29 October	"I Just Called to Say I Love You"	Stevie Wonder	The Woman in Red	Stevie Wonder	
5 November	"I Just Called to Say I Love You"	Stevie Wonder	The Woman in Red	Stevie Wonder	
12 November	"I Just Called to Say I Love You"	Stevie Wonder	The Woman in Red	Stevie Wonder	
19 November	"I Just Called to Say I Love You"	Stevie Wonder	Private Dancer	Tina Turner	
26 November	"I Just Called to Say I Love You"	Stevie Wonder	The Woman in Red	Stevie Wonder	
3 December	"I Just Called to Say I Love You"	Stevie Wonder	The Woman in Red	Stevie Wonder	
10 December	"I Just Called to Say I Love You"	Stevie Wonder	Private Dancer	Tina Turner	
17 December (Note: The issue dated 17 December 1984 was a double issue.)	"I Just Called to Say I Love You"	Stevie Wonder	Private Dancer	Tina Turner	
24 December	No chart published				
31 December	No chart published				
