= List of Black Singles number ones of 1982 =

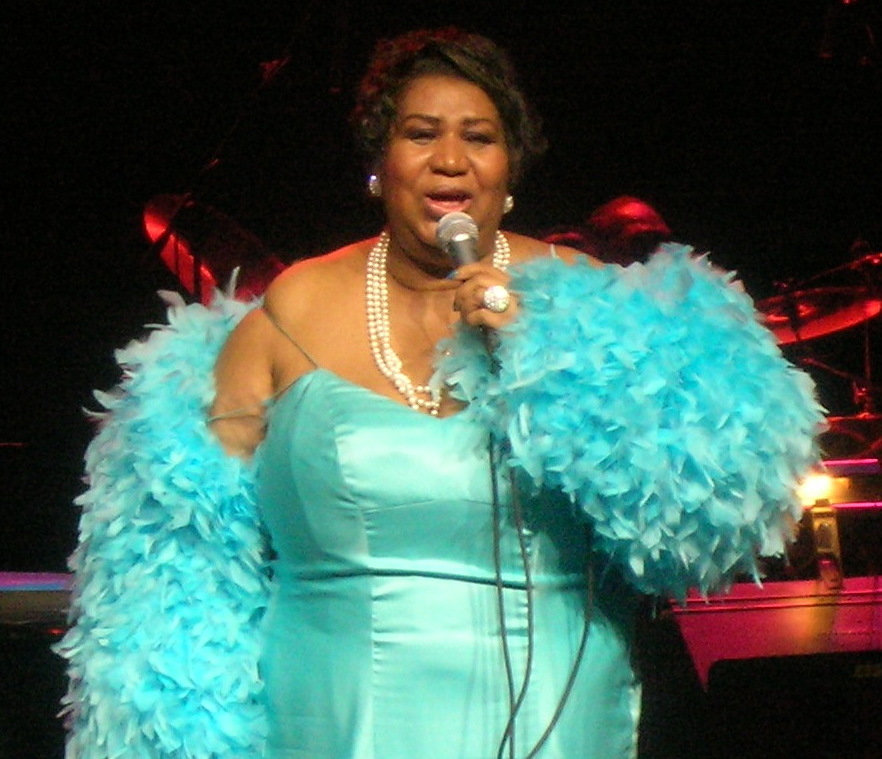
Aretha Franklin (pictured in 2007) surpassed James Brown's record 17 number ones on the chart when "Jump to It" became her 18th chart-topper in September.

Billboard published a weekly chart in 1982 ranking the top-performing singles in the United States in African American-oriented genres; the chart has undergone various name changes over the decades to reflect the evolution of black music and, since 2005, has been published as Hot R&B/Hip-Hop Songs. In 1982, the chart was published under the title Hot Soul Singles through the issue of Billboard dated June 19, and Black Singles thereafter, with an article in the June 26 issue of the magazine stating that the name change was based on the fact that "blacks [sic] have been making and buying pop music of greater stylistic variety than the soul sound since the early 1970s". During the year, 14 different singles topped the chart.

In the issue of Billboard dated January 2, the number-one position was occupied by "Let's Groove" by Earth, Wind & Fire, the song's sixth week in the top spot. The track remained at number one for two further weeks before being replaced by "Turn Your Love Around" by George Benson. During the year, six acts reached number one on the listing for the first time, beginning with two consecutive chart-toppers in January and February, "I Can't Go For That (No Can Do)" by Daryl Hall & John Oates and "Call Me" by Skyy. Richard "Dimples" Fields, Dazz Band, Jennifer Holliday, and Zapp also reached the top position for the first time. Of the six acts who debuted atop the listing in 1982, only Skyy would achieve a second number one on the listing. "I Can't Go For That (No Can Do)" also topped Billboard's pop chart, the Hot 100, the only one of the year's soul/black chart-toppers to do so. In contrast, Fields' "If It Ain't One Thing, It's Another" only reached number 47 on the Hot 100, and "Dance Floor, Part 1" by Zapp did not enter the pop listing at all.

Aretha Franklin, known as the "Queen of Soul", surpassed the record previously held by James Brown for the most number ones since black music sales and airplay were combined into one chart in 1958 when her single "Jump to It" reached the peak position in September, giving Franklin her 18th number one on the listing. The longest reign at the top during 1982 was nine weeks, achieved by "That Girl" by Stevie Wonder; it was Wonder's 14th number one on the chart and the longest-running of his career. "Sexual Healing" by Marvin Gaye spent eight weeks at number one during the year but extended its run to ten in early 1983, making it the longest-running number one on the chart since 1962. It was Gaye's first number one on the chart since 1977 and would prove to be his last before he was killed in 1984.

== Chart history ==
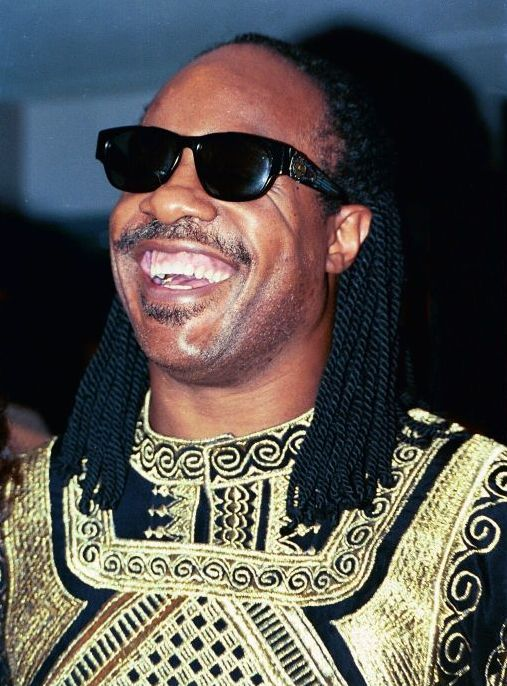
Stevie Wonder (pictured in 1994) had the longest-running number one on the chart of his career with "That Girl".

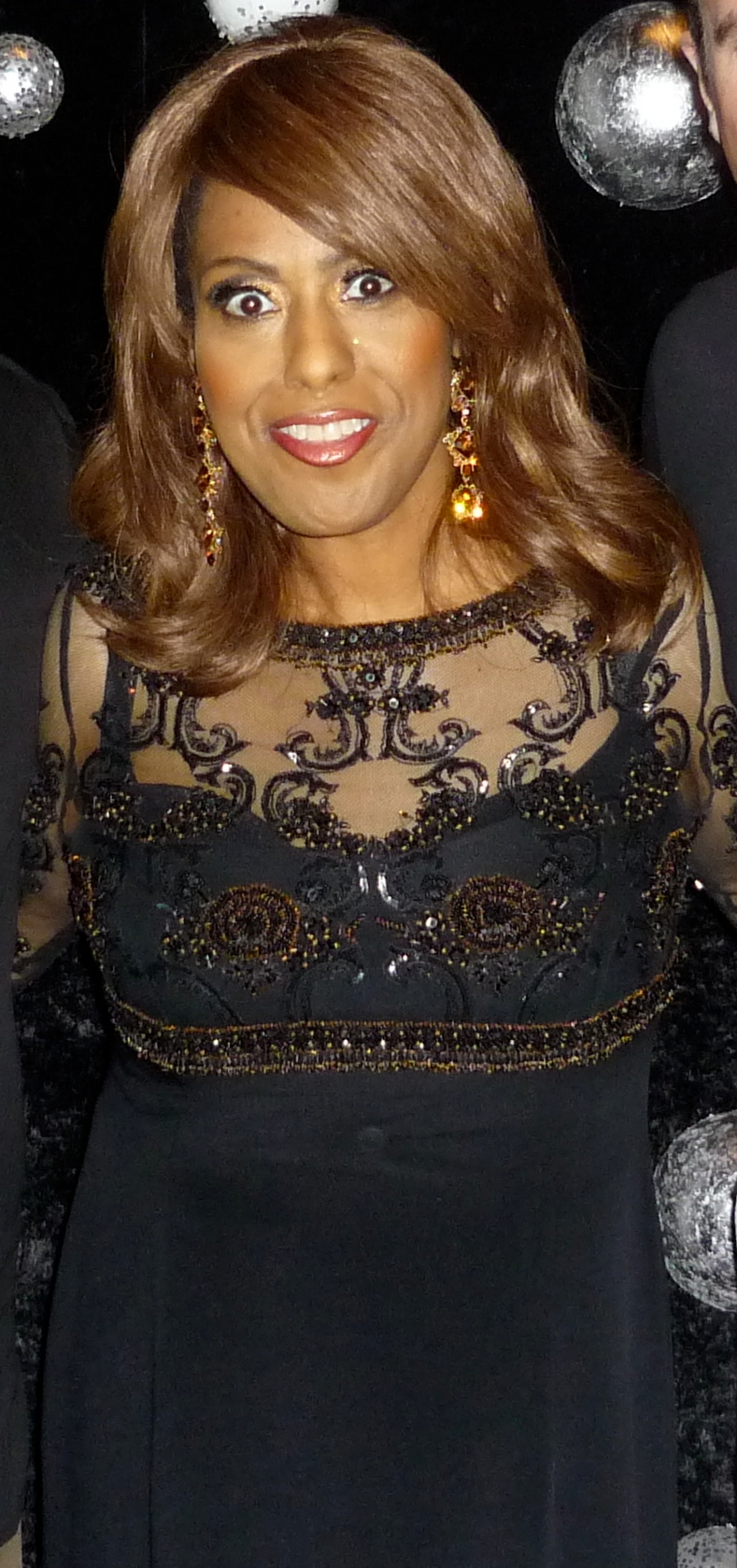
Jennifer Holliday (pictured in 2007) reached number one with "And I Am Telling You I'm Not Going" from the Broadway musical Dreamgirls.

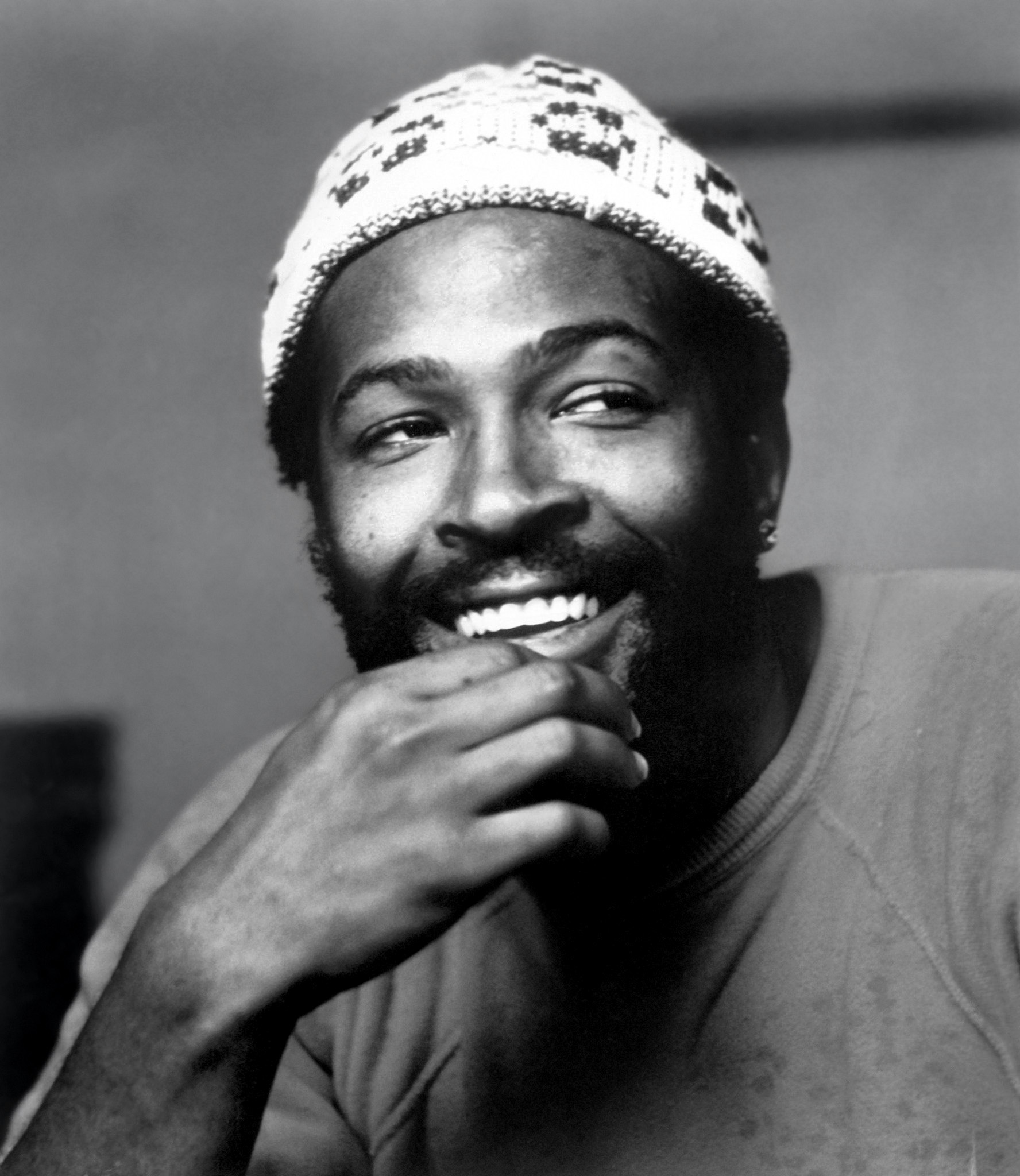
Marvin Gaye (pictured in 1973) ended the year atop the chart with "Sexual Healing".

Key
†	Indicates number 1 on Billboard's year-end soul/black chart

Chart history
Issue date	Title	Artist(s)	Ref.
January 2	"Let's Groove"	Earth, Wind & Fire	
January 9	"Let's Groove"	Earth, Wind & Fire	
January 16	"Let's Groove"	Earth, Wind & Fire	
January 23	"Turn Your Love Around"	George Benson	
January 30	"I Can't Go For That (No Can Do)"	Daryl Hall & John Oates	
February 6	"Call Me"	Skyy	
February 13	"Call Me"	Skyy	
February 20	"That Girl" †	Stevie Wonder	
February 27	"That Girl" †	Stevie Wonder	
March 6	"That Girl" †	Stevie Wonder	
March 13	"That Girl" †	Stevie Wonder	
March 20	"That Girl" †	Stevie Wonder	
March 27	"That Girl" †	Stevie Wonder	
April 3	"That Girl" †	Stevie Wonder	
April 10	"That Girl" †	Stevie Wonder	
April 17	"That Girl" †	Stevie Wonder	
April 24	"If It Ain't One Thing, It's Another"	Richard "Dimples" Fields	
May 1	"If It Ain't One Thing, It's Another"	Richard "Dimples" Fields	
May 8	"If It Ain't One Thing, It's Another"	Richard "Dimples" Fields	
May 15	"It's Gonna Take a Miracle"	Deniece Williams	
May 22	"It's Gonna Take a Miracle"	Deniece Williams	
May 29	"Let It Whip"	Dazz Band	
June 5	"Let It Whip"	Dazz Band	
June 12	"Let It Whip"	Dazz Band	
June 19	"Let It Whip"	Dazz Band	
June 26	"Early in the Morning"	The Gap Band	
July 3	"Let It Whip"	Dazz Band	
July 10	"Early in the Morning"	The Gap Band	
July 17	"Early in the Morning"	The Gap Band	
July 24	"And I Am Telling You I'm Not Going"	Jennifer Holliday	
July 31	"And I Am Telling You I'm Not Going"	Jennifer Holliday	
August 7	"And I Am Telling You I'm Not Going"	Jennifer Holliday	
August 14	"And I Am Telling You I'm Not Going"	Jennifer Holliday	
August 21	"Dance Floor, Part 1"	Zapp	
August 28	"Dance Floor, Part 1"	Zapp	
September 4	"Jump to It"	Aretha Franklin	
September 11	"Jump to It"	Aretha Franklin	
September 18	"Jump to It"	Aretha Franklin	
September 25	"Jump to It"	Aretha Franklin	
October 2	"Love Come Down"	Evelyn "Champagne" King	
October 9	"Love Come Down"	Evelyn "Champagne" King	
October 16	"Love Come Down"	Evelyn "Champagne" King	
October 23	"Love Come Down"	Evelyn "Champagne" King	
October 30	"Love Come Down"	Evelyn "Champagne" King	
November 6	"Sexual Healing"	Marvin Gaye	
November 13	"Sexual Healing"	Marvin Gaye	
November 20	"Sexual Healing"	Marvin Gaye	
November 27	"Sexual Healing"	Marvin Gaye	
December 4	"Sexual Healing"	Marvin Gaye	
December 11	"Sexual Healing"	Marvin Gaye	
December 18	"Sexual Healing"	Marvin Gaye	
December 25	"Sexual Healing"	Marvin Gaye	

== See also ==
- 1982 in music
- Billboard Year-End Hot Black Singles of 1982
- List of Billboard Hot 100 number ones of 1982
