= I'll Let You Slide =

Single by Luther Vandross

from the album Busy Body
- Released: 1983 (U.S.)
- Genre: R&B, soul
- Length: 5:01 single version
- Label: Epic Records
- Songwriter(s): Luther Vandross, Marcus Miller
- Producer(s): Luther Vandross, Marcus Miller

Luther Vandross singles chronology
"How Many Times Can We Say Goodbye" (1983)	"I'll Let You Slide" (1983)	"Superstar (Delaney and Bonnie song)/Until You Come Back to Me (That's What I'm Gonna Do)" (1984)

"I'll Let You Slide" is a song by American recording artist Luther Vandross. The song is from his third studio album Busy Body. Released in 1983, the single reached No. 9 on the Billboard Hot R&B Singles chart.

== Track listing ==
- A "I'll Let You Slide" (Vocal) – 5:18
- B "I'll Let You Slide" (Instrumental) – 5:18

== Personnel ==
- Luther Vandross – lead and background vocals, vocal arrangement
- Yogi Horton – drums
- Marcus Miller – bass, synthesizers, rhythm arrangement, synthesizer arrangement
- Nat Adderley Jr. – keyboards
- Georg Wadenius, Doc Powell – guitars
- Steve Kroon – congas
- Paulinho da Costa – percussion
- Tawatha Agee, Brenda White, Robin Clark, Alfa Anderson, Cheryl Lynn, Paulette McWilliams, David Lasley, Darlene Love – background vocals

== Charts ==
Chart (1983)	Peak position
US Billboard Hot R&B Singles	9
