= List of Billboard number-one R&B albums of 1984 =

These are the Billboard magazine R&B albums that reached number one in 1984.

== Chart history ==
Issue date	Album	Artist
January 7	Can't Slow Down	Lionel Richie
January 14	Can't Slow Down	Lionel Richie
January 21	Can't Slow Down	Lionel Richie
January 28	Can't Slow Down	Lionel Richie
February 4	Can't Slow Down	Lionel Richie
February 11	Can't Slow Down	Lionel Richie
February 18	Can't Slow Down	Lionel Richie
February 25	Can't Slow Down	Lionel Richie
March 3	Can't Slow Down	Lionel Richie
March 10	Thriller	Michael Jackson
March 17	Thriller	Michael Jackson
March 24	Thriller	Michael Jackson
March 31	Thriller	Michael Jackson
April 7	Thriller	Michael Jackson
April 14	Busy Body	Luther Vandross
April 21	Busy Body	Luther Vandross
April 28	She's Strange	Cameo
May 5	She's Strange	Cameo
May 12	Can't Slow Down	Lionel Richie
May 19	Can't Slow Down	Lionel Richie
May 26	Can't Slow Down	Lionel Richie
June 2	Can't Slow Down	Lionel Richie
June 9	Can't Slow Down	Lionel Richie
June 16	Can't Slow Down	Lionel Richie
June 23	Can't Slow Down	Lionel Richie
June 30	Can't Slow Down	Lionel Richie
July 7	Jermaine Jackson	Jermaine Jackson
July 14	Lady	One Way
July 21	Private Dancer	Tina Turner
July 28	Purple Rain	Soundtrack / Prince and The Revolution
August 4	Purple Rain	Soundtrack / Prince and The Revolution
August 11	Purple Rain	Soundtrack / Prince and The Revolution
August 18	Purple Rain	Soundtrack / Prince and The Revolution
August 25	Purple Rain	Soundtrack / Prince and The Revolution
September 1	Purple Rain	Soundtrack / Prince and The Revolution
September 8	Purple Rain	Soundtrack / Prince and The Revolution
September 15	Purple Rain	Soundtrack / Prince and The Revolution
September 22	Purple Rain	Soundtrack / Prince and The Revolution
September 29	Purple Rain	Soundtrack / Prince and The Revolution
October 6	Purple Rain	Soundtrack / Prince and The Revolution
October 13	Purple Rain	Soundtrack / Prince and The Revolution
October 21	Purple Rain	Soundtrack / Prince and The Revolution
October 27	Purple Rain	Soundtrack / Prince and The Revolution
November 3	Purple Rain	Soundtrack / Prince and The Revolution
November 10	Purple Rain	Soundtrack / Prince and The Revolution
November 17	Purple Rain	Soundtrack / Prince and The Revolution
November 24	Purple Rain	Soundtrack / Prince and The Revolution
December 1	Purple Rain	Soundtrack / Prince and The Revolution
December 8	The Woman in Red	Soundtrack / Stevie Wonder
December 15	The Woman in Red	Soundtrack / Stevie Wonder
December 22	The Woman in Red	Soundtrack / Stevie Wonder
December 29	The Woman in Red	Soundtrack / Stevie Wonder

== See also ==
- 1984 in music
- R&B number-one hits of 1984 (USA)
