= List of Cash Box Top 100 number-one singles of 1982 =

This is the list of singles that reached number one on the Cash Box Top 100 Singles chart in 1982, presented in chronological order.

Key
†	Indicates best-performing single of 1982

Issue date	Song	Artist
January 2	"Physical"	Olivia Newton-John
January 9	"Physical"	Olivia Newton-John
January 16	"I Can't Go for That (No Can Do)"	Daryl Hall and John Oates
January 23	"I Can't Go for That (No Can Do)"	Daryl Hall and John Oates
January 30	"Centerfold"	The J. Geils Band
February 6	"Centerfold"	The J. Geils Band
February 13	"Centerfold"	The J. Geils Band
February 20	"Centerfold"	The J. Geils Band
February 27	"Centerfold"	The J. Geils Band
March 6	"Centerfold"	The J. Geils Band
March 13	"Open Arms"	Journey
March 20	"I Love Rock 'n Roll"	Joan Jett and the Blackhearts
March 27	"I Love Rock 'n Roll"	Joan Jett and the Blackhearts
April 3	"That Girl"	Stevie Wonder
April 10	"I Love Rock 'n Roll"	Joan Jett and the Blackhearts
April 17	"I Love Rock 'n Roll"	Joan Jett and the Blackhearts
April 24	"I Love Rock 'n Roll"	Joan Jett and the Blackhearts
May 1	"Chariots of Fire"	Vangelis
May 8	"Chariots of Fire"	Vangelis
May 15	"Ebony and Ivory"	Paul McCartney and Stevie Wonder
May 22	"Ebony and Ivory"	Paul McCartney and Stevie Wonder
May 29	"Ebony and Ivory"	Paul McCartney and Stevie Wonder
June 5	"Ebony and Ivory"	Paul McCartney and Stevie Wonder
June 12	"Ebony and Ivory"	Paul McCartney and Stevie Wonder
June 19	"Ebony and Ivory"	Paul McCartney and Stevie Wonder
June 26	"Don't You Want Me"	The Human League
July 3	"Don't You Want Me"	The Human League
July 10	"Don't You Want Me"	The Human League
July 17	"Don't You Want Me"	The Human League
July 24	"Hurts So Good"	John Cougar
July 31	"Eye of the Tiger" †	Survivor
August 7	"Eye of the Tiger" †	Survivor
August 14	"Eye of the Tiger" †	Survivor
August 21	"Eye of the Tiger" †	Survivor
August 28	"Abracadabra"	Steve Miller Band
September 4	"Abracadabra"	Steve Miller Band
September 11	"Abracadabra"	Steve Miller Band
September 18	"Abracadabra"	Steve Miller Band
September 25	"Abracadabra"	Steve Miller Band
October 2	"Jack and Diane"	John Cougar
October 9	"Jack and Diane"	John Cougar
October 16	"Jack and Diane"	John Cougar
October 23	"Who Can It Be Now?"	Men at Work
October 30	"Who Can It Be Now?"	Men at Work
November 6	"Up Where We Belong"	Joe Cocker and Jennifer Warnes
November 13	"Up Where We Belong"	Joe Cocker and Jennifer Warnes
November 20	"Up Where We Belong"	Joe Cocker and Jennifer Warnes
November 27	"Gloria"	Laura Branigan
December 4	"Truly"	Lionel Richie
December 11	"Truly"	Lionel Richie
December 18	"Maneater"	Daryl Hall and John Oates
December 25	"Maneater"	Daryl Hall and John Oates

== See also ==
- 1982 in music
- List of Hot 100 number-one singles of 1982 (U.S.)
