= Skyy (album) =

Studio album by Skyy
- Released: 1979
- Recorded: 1979 at Music Farm Studios, New York City, New York
- Genre: Soul
- Length: 38:58
- Label: Salsoul
- Producer: Randy Muller, Solomon Roberts, Jr.

Skyy chronology
Skyy (1979)	Skyway (1980)

Skyy is the debut album released by New York City based group Skyy released in 1979 on Salsoul Records.

Professional ratings
Review scores
Source	Rating
Allmusic	4/5 stars

== Track listing ==
Side one
No.	Title	Writer(s)	Length
1.	"This Groove Is Bad"	Solomon Roberts, Jr.	6:20
2.	"First Time Around"	Randy Muller	6:37
3.	"Let's Turn It Out"	Muller	6:37

Side two
No.	Title	Writer(s)	Length
4.	"Fallin' In Love Again"	Roberts, Jr.	4:51
5.	"Stand By Me"	Roberts, Jr.	5:04
6.	"Disco Dancin'"	Muller	4:12
7.	"Let's Get Up (S-k-y-y)"	Roberts, Jr.	5:17

== Personnel ==
- Randy Muller - Flute, Keyboards, Percussion
- Solomon Roberts, Jr. - Drums, Guitar, Vocals
- Gerald Lebon - Bass
- Tommy McConnell - Drums
- Anibal "Butch" Sierra - Guitar
- Larry Greenberg - Keyboards
- Bonny Dunning, Delores Dunning, Denise Dunning Crawford - Vocals

=== Additional Personnel ===
- Andrew Langston - Keyboards
- Kevin Davis - Congas
- Gerald Lebon - Vocals (on Disco Dancin')
- Irving Spice Boys - Strings

== Charts ==
Year	Album	Chart positions	
Year	Album	US	US R&B
1979	Skyy	177	40

=== Singles ===
Year	Single	Chart positions	
Year	Single	US R&B	US Dance
1979	"First Time Around"	20	50
1979	"Let's Turn It Out"	65	—
