= The Night I Fell in Love (album) =

Studio album by Luther Vandross
- Released: March 8, 1985
- Recorded: June–October 1984
- Studio: AIR Studios (Montserrat); Mediasound Studios and Power Station (New York City, New York); Minot Sound (White Plains, New York); Westlake Recording Studios, (Los Angeles, California)
- Genre: R&B, soul
- Length: 41:29
- Label: Epic
- Producer: Luther Vandross; Marcus Miller

Luther Vandross chronology
Busy Body (1983)	The Night I Fell in Love (1985)	Give Me the Reason (1986)

Singles from The Night I Fell in Love
- 1. "Til My Baby Comes Home" Released: January 1985; 2. "If Only for One Night" Released: March 1985; 3. "It's Over Now" Released: June 1985

Professional ratings
Review scores
Source	Rating
AllMusic	4/5 stars
Chicago Tribune	3.5/4 stars
Robert Christgau	B+
Q	4/5 stars
Rolling Stone	(mixed)

The Night I Fell in Love is the fourth studio album by American R&B/soul singer-songwriter Luther Vandross, released on March 8, 1985, by Epic Records. In 1986, Vandross garnered a nomination for the Grammy Award for Best Male R&B Vocal Performance and two American Music Awards, Favorite Soul/R&B Male Artist and Favorite Soul/R&B Album. The first single "'Til My Baby Comes Home" is notable for featuring Billy Preston on organ.

The Night I Fell in Love reached number nineteen on the US Billboard 200 album chart and topped the Top R&B/Hip-Hop Albums charts, it was ranked #93 on Rolling Stone Magazine's list of the 100 best albums of the 1980s. The album was later certified double platinum by the Recording Industry Association of America (RIAA).

== Track listing ==
Side A
No.	Title	Writer(s)	Length
1.	"'Til My Baby Comes Home"	Luther Vandross, Marcus Miller	5:31
2.	"The Night I Fell in Love"	Vandross, Miller	6:06
3.	"If Only for One Night"	Brenda Russell	4:15
4.	"Creepin'"	Stevie Wonder	4:04

Side B
No.	Title	Writer(s)	Length
5.	"It's Over Now"	Vandross, Miller	6:09
6.	"Wait for Love"	Vandross, Nat Adderley, Jr.	5:16
7.	"My Sensitivity (Gets in the Way)"	Vandross	4:10
8.	"Other Side of the World"	Vandross, Adderley	5:58

== Personnel ==
- Luther Vandross – lead vocals, backing vocals, vocal arrangements
- Nat Adderley, Jr. – keyboards, synthesizers, string arrangements, rhythm and synthesizer arrangements (3, 4, 6–8)
- John "Skip" Anderson – synthesizers, synthesizer programming
- Marcus Miller – synthesizers, backing vocals, rhythm and synthesizer arrangements (1, 2, 5), bass (2–8)
- Ed Walsh – synthesizers, synthesizer programming
- Billy Preston – organ (1)
- Doc Powell – guitars
- Georg Wadenius – guitars
- Eluriel Barfield – bass (1)
- Yogi Horton – drums
- Paulinho da Costa – percussion, congas
- Steve Kroon – congas, bongos
- Phillip Ballou – backing vocals
- Fonzi Thornton – backing vocals
- Michelle Cobbs – alto vocals
- Darlene Love – alto vocals
- Paulette McWilliams – alto vocals
- Brenda White King – alto vocals
- Alfa Anderson – soprano vocals
- Lisa Fischer – soprano vocals
- Cissy Houston – soprano vocals
- Yvonne Lewis – soprano vocals

=== Production ===
- Larkin Arnold – executive producer
- Marcus Miller – producer (1, 2, 5)
- Luther Vandross – producer
- Ray Bardani – engineer, mixing
- Matt Butler – assistant engineer
- Ric Butz – assistant engineer
- Iris Cohen – assistant engineer
- Dave Greenberg – assistant engineer
- Alex Haas – assistant engineer
- Garry Rindfuss – assistant engineer
- Tom Roberts – assistant engineer
- Bruce Wildstein – assistant engineer
- Greg Calbi – mastering at Sterling Sound (New York, NY)
- Dominick Celani – production assistant
- Barri Kaye – production manager
- Gordon Elliott – production coordinator
- Sephra Herman – production coordinator, music contractor
- George Corsillo – art direction, design
- Brian Hagiwara – photography
- Ret Turner – clothing
- Cornell Hill – hair stylist
- Jeff Jones – make-up
- Shep Gordon – management
- Daniel S. Markus – management
- Alive Enterprises, Inc. – management company

Studio management

- Diane Alleyne (Power Station)
- Thomas Cimillo (Minot Sound)
- Yvonne Kelly (AIR Studios)
- Paula Marshall (Westlake Studios)
- Susan Planer (Mediasound)
- Bob Walters (Power Station)

== Charts ==
=== Weekly charts ===
Chart (1985)	Peak position
New Zealand Albums (RMNZ)	25
UK Albums (OCC)	19
US Billboard 200	19
US Top R&B/Hip-Hop Albums (Billboard)	1

=== Year-end charts ===
Chart (1985)	Position
US Billboard 200	45
US Top R&B/Hip-Hop Albums (Billboard)	5

Chart (1986)	Position
US Top R&B/Hip-Hop Albums (Billboard)	30

== Certifications ==
Region	Certification	Certified units/sales
United States (RIAA)	2× Platinum	2,000,000^{^}
^{^} Shipments figures based on certification alone.
