= I Just Called to Say I Love You =

1984 single by Stevie Wonder

- French release sleeve

Single by Stevie Wonder

from the album The Woman in Red
- B-side: "I Just Called to Say I Love You (Instrumental)"
- Released: August 1, 1984
- Studio: Frank Farian's Far Studios (Rosbach vor der Höhe, Germany)
- Genre: R&B
- Length: 6:17 (album version); 4:25 (single version); 6:44 (12" version)
- Label: Motown; MCA
- Songwriter: Stevie Wonder
- Producer: Stevie Wonder

Stevie Wonder singles chronology
"Front Line" (1983)	"I Just Called to Say I Love You" (1984)	"Love Light in Flight" (1984)

Audio video
- "I Just Called To Say I Love You" on YouTube

"I Just Called to Say I Love You" is a ballad written, produced, and performed by American R&B singer and songwriter Stevie Wonder. It was a major international hit, and remains Wonder's best-selling single to date, reaching number one in 28 countries worldwide.

The song was the lead single from the 1984 soundtrack album The Woman in Red, along with two other songs by Wonder, and scored number one on the Billboard Hot 100 for three weeks from October 13 to 27, 1984. It also became his tenth number-one on the R&B chart, and his fourth on the adult contemporary chart; it spent three weeks at the top of both charts, and for the same weeks as on the Hot 100. The song also became Wonder's only solo UK number-one success, staying at the top for six weeks, in the process also becoming Motown Records' biggest-selling single in the UK, a distinction it still held as of 2023. In addition, the song won both a Golden Globe and an Academy Award for Best Original Song. The song also received three nominations at the 27th Annual Grammy Awards for Best Male Pop Vocal Performance, Song of the Year, and Best Pop Instrumental Performance.

== Composition ==
The song's lyrics have Wonder surprising someone in his life with an unexpected telephone call. Throughout the song, Wonder lists various events in a yearly calendar that might prompt someone to call a loved one. Yet he explains no special annual event such as New Year's Day or Halloween spurred the call. He simply wants to say that he loves her from the bottom of his heart. Cash Box described the song as "a tender and romantic love letter which captures the ever-present and Wonderous feeling of love and optimism."

There was a dispute among Wonder, his former writing partner Lee Garrett, and Lloyd Chiate as to who actually wrote the song. Chiate claimed in a lawsuit that he and Garrett wrote the song years before its 1984 release. However, a jury ultimately sided with Wonder.

== Personnel ==
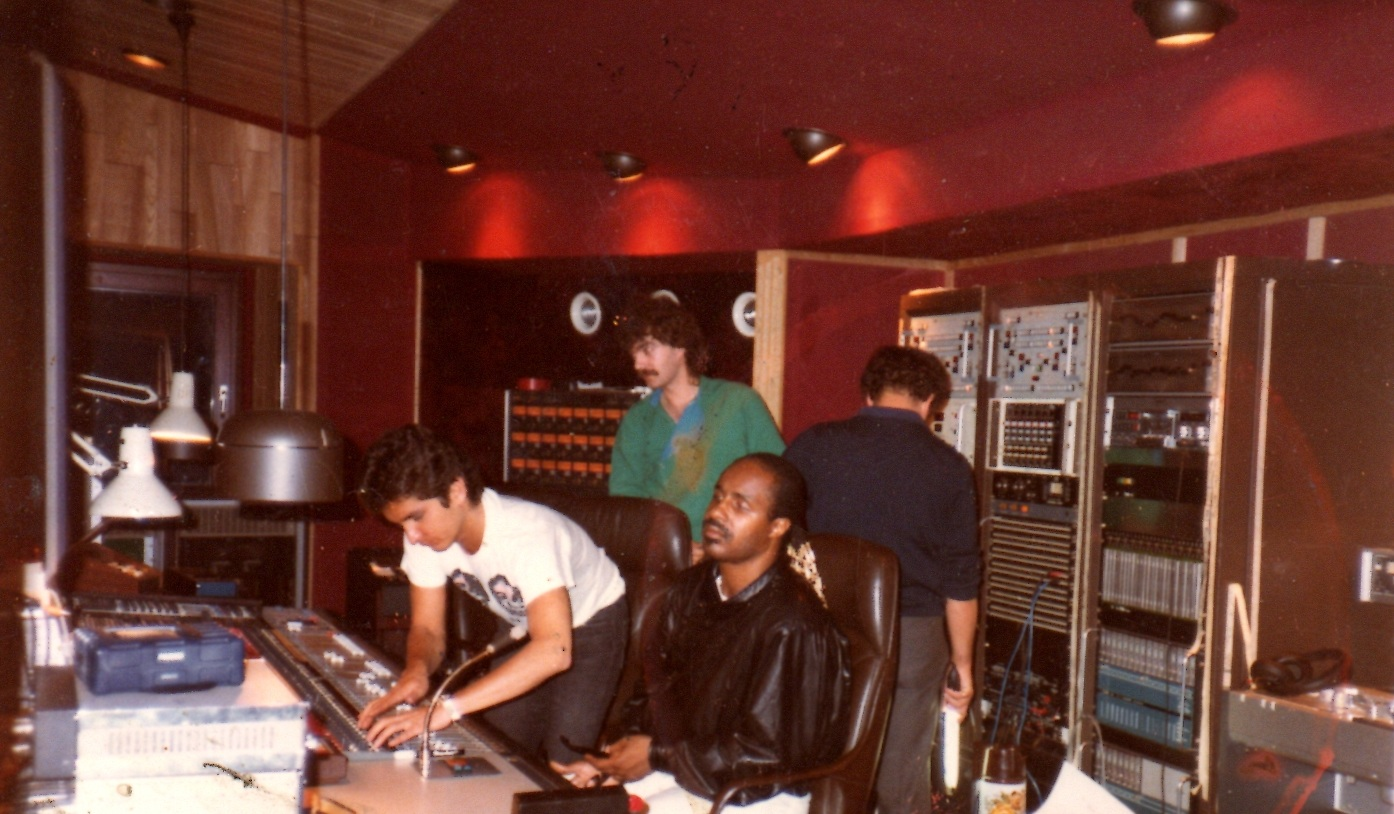
Mixing at Frank Farian's FAR STUDIOS in Germany, 1984

- Stevie Wonder – lead and backing vocals, synthesizers, programming, Roland VP-330, Linn 9000, and Oberheim DMX
- Ralph Rupper – audio engineer
- Gary Olazabal – producer / composer and audio engineer
- Peter Joiko – audio engineer

== Music video ==
A music video of the song has Wonder, during a concert, singing into a telephone receiver while seated at a piano. By the end of the song, he and the audience are standing and swaying to the music. The video features concert footage recorded in Rotterdam Ahoy, in the Netherlands, on August 10, 1984.

== Cover versions ==
The song was covered by John Prine, among many others.

== Charts ==
=== Weekly charts ===
Weekly chart performance for "I Just Called to Say I Love You"
Chart (1984–1985)	Peak position
Argentina (CAPIF)	2
Australia (Kent Music Report)	1
Austria (Ö3 Austria Top 40)	1
Belgium (Ultratop 50 Flanders)	1
Brazil (ABPD)	1
Canada Top Singles (RPM)	1
Canada Adult Contemporary (RPM)	1
Chile (UPI)	1
Costa Rica (UPI)	2
Denmark (Hitlisten)	1
El Salvador (UPI)	4
Europe (European Hot 100 Singles)	1
Finland (Suomen virallinen lista)	1
France (IFOP)	1
Greece (Pop & Rock)	1
Guatemala (UPI)	2
Iceland (RÚV)	2
Ireland (IRMA)	1
Israel (IBA)	2
Italy (FIMI)	1
Japan (Oricon)	35
Netherlands (Dutch Top 40)	1
Netherlands (Single Top 100)	1
New Zealand (Recorded Music NZ)	1
Nicaragua (UPI)	1
Norway (VG-lista)	1
Panama (UPI)	1
Peru (UPI)	1
Portugal (AFP)	1
Puerto Rico (UPI)	1
South Africa (Springbok)	1
Spain (AFYVE)	1
Sweden (Sverigetopplistan)	1
Switzerland (Schweizer Hitparade)	1
UK Singles (Official Charts)	1
Uruguay (UPI)	1
US Billboard Hot 100	1
US Adult Contemporary (Billboard)	1
US Hot R&B/Hip-Hop Songs (Billboard)	1
US Cash Box Top 100	1
Venezuela (UPI)	3
West Germany (GfK)	1
Zimbabwe (ZIMA)	1

Weekly chart performance for "I Just Called to Say I Love You"
Chart (2016)	Peak position
South Korea International (Circle)	26

2019–20 chart performance for "I Just Called to Say I Love You"
Chart (2019–20)	Peak position
Slovenia (SloTop50)	43

=== Year-end charts ===
1984 year-end chart performance for "I Just Called to Say I Love You"
Chart (1984)	Position
Australia (Kent Music Report)	6
Austria (Ö3 Austria Top 40)	9
Belgium (Ultratop)	1
Brazil (ABPD)	3
Canada Top Singles (RPM)	1
Chile (UPI)	3
Italy (FIMI)	1
Netherlands (Dutch Top 40)	1
Netherlands (Single Top 100)	4
New Zealand (Recorded Music NZ)	2
Switzerland (Schweizer Hitparade)	11
UK Singles (OCC)	2
US Billboard Hot 100	25
US Hot R&B/Hip-Hop Songs (Billboard)	23
West Germany (Official German Charts)	6

1985 year-end chart performance for "I Just Called to Say I Love You"
Chart (1985)	Position
Australia (Kent Music Report)	63

2024 year-end chart performance for "I Just Called to Say I Love You"
Chart (2024)	Position
Estonia Airplay (TopHit)	198

2025 year-end chart performance for "I Just Called to Say I Love You"
Chart (2025)	Position
Estonia Airplay (TopHit)	155

=== Decade-end charts ===
Decade-end chart performance for "I Just Called to Say I Love You"
Chart (1980–1989)	Position
Australian Singles Chart	5
UK Singles Chart	3
US Billboard Hot 100	73

=== All-time charts ===
All-time chart performance for "I Just Called to Say I Love You"
Chart	Position
UK Singles (OCC)	13
US Billboard Hot 100 (1958-2018)	370

== Sales and certifications ==
Certifications and sales for "I Just Called to Say I Love You"
Region	Certification	Certified units/sales
Canada (Music Canada)	3× Platinum	408,000
Denmark (IFPI Danmark)	Gold	45,000^{‡}
France (SNEP)	Gold	800,000
Germany (BVMI)	Gold	500,000^{^}
Italy (FIMI)	Gold	50,000^{‡}
Netherlands (NVPI)	Platinum	100,000^{^}
New Zealand (RMNZ)	2× Platinum	60,000^{‡}
Portugal (AFP)	Platinum	170,000
Russia (NFPF) Ringtone	Gold	100,000^{*}
South Korea	—	27,942 (Note: Cumulative sales of "I Just Called to Say I Love You" in South Korea: 2016 (Month 1): 18,009; 2016 (Month 2): 9,933)
United Kingdom (BPI)	Platinum	1,874,225
United States (RIAA)	Gold	1,000,000^{^}
^{*} Sales figures based on certification alone.^{^} Shipments figures based on certification alone.^{‡} Sales+streaming figures based on certification alone.

== See also ==
- List of number-one singles in Australia during the 1980s
- List of RPM number-one singles of 1984
- List of European number-one hits of 1984
- List of number-one hits of 1984 (France)
- List of number-one hits of 1984 (Germany)
- List of number-one singles of 1984 (Ireland)
- List of Dutch Top 40 number-one singles of 1984
- List of number-one singles in 1984 (New Zealand)
- List of number-one hits in Norway
- List of number-one hits (Sweden)
- List of number-one hits of 1984 (Switzerland)
- List of number-one singles from the 1980s (UK)
- List of Hot 100 number-one singles of 1984 (U.S.)
- List of number-one R&B singles of 1984 (U.S.)
- List of number-one adult contemporary singles of 1984 (U.S.)
