= Front Line (song) =

Single by Stevie Wonder

from the album Stevie Wonder's Original Musiquarium I
- B-side: "Front Line (Instrumental)"
- Released: January 1983
- Genre: R&B, soul
- Length: 5:54
- Label: Tamla
- Songwriter: Stevie Wonder
- Producer: Stevie Wonder

Stevie Wonder singles chronology
"Used To Be" (1982)	"Front Line" (1983)	"I Just Called to Say I Love You" (1984)

"Front Line" is a 1983 release written and produced by American R&B singer and songwriter Stevie Wonder, off his greatest hits compilation Stevie Wonder's Original Musiquarium I (1982).

== Critical reception ==
Robert Palmer of the New York Times described Front Line as "a starkly economical, eloquently anguished portrait of a Vietnam veteran's bitterness and dead-end fatalism, and an exciting mixture of guitar rock in a Cream/Hendrix vein with springy funk." Record Mirror's Jim Reid called it a "raunchy mix of rock and funk that does nothing for me, but I'm reliably informed it'll have all the after hours drinkers tapping their feet and getting on down to it."

== Personnel ==
- Stevie Wonder: vocals, keyboards, drums
- Benjamin Bridges: electric guitar
- Nathan Watts: bass

== Charts ==
Chart (1983)	Peak position
UK Singles (OCC)	94
