= Skyyjammer =

Studio album by Skyy
- Released: 1982
- Recorded: 1982 at Blanktapes Studios, New York City, New York; Studio Masters, Los Angeles, California
- Genre: Soul, post-disco, urban
- Label: Salsoul
- Producer: Randy Muller, Solomon Roberts, Jr.

Skyy chronology
| Skyy Line (1981) | Skyyjammer (1982) | Skyylight (1983) |

Professional ratings
Review scores
| Source | Rating |
|---|---|
| Allmusic | 3/5 stars |

Skyyjammer is the fifth album by New York City based group Skyy released in 1982 on Salsoul Records.

== Track listing ==
| No. | Title | Writer(s) | Length |
|---|---|---|---|
| 1. | "Movin' Violation" | Solomon Roberts, Jr. | 4:59 |
| 2. | "Won't You Be Mine" | Randy Muller | 5:33 |
| 3. | "This Song Is For You" | Roberts, Jr. | 4:08 |
| 4. | "Miracle" | Muller | 4:01 |
| 5. | "Skyyjammer" | Roberts, Jr. | 5:08 |
| 6. | "Let Love Shine" | Tommy McConnell | 4:58 |
| 7. | "Together" | Roberts, Jr., Gerald Lebon | 3:55 |
| 8. | "Freak Outta" | Roberts, Jr. | 4:48 |

== Charts ==
| Year | Album | Chart positions | |
| Year | Album | US | US R&B |
|---|---|---|---|
| 1983 | Skyyjammer | 81 | 22 |

=== Singles ===
| Year | Single | Chart positions | | |
| Year | Single | US | US R&B | US Dance |
|---|---|---|---|---|
| 1982 | "Movin' Violation" | — | 26 | — |
| 1983 | "Let Love Shine" | — | 39 | 41 |
