= Start of a Romance (album) =

Studio album by Skyy
- Released: 1989
- Recorded: 1988–1989
- Genre: Soul, R&B, dance music
- Length: 43:43
- Label: Atlantic
- Producer: Randy Muller, Solomon Roberts Jr.

Skyy chronology
From the Left Side (1986)	Start of a Romance (1989)	Nearer to You (1992)

Start of a Romance is the ninth album by the New York-based R&B/soul band Skyy. After a three-year hiatus from the charts, the group appeared to have already passed their peak. However, this album became a major comeback success for the group, featuring two number-one R&B singles, the title track ("Start of a Romance") and "Real Love". "Real Love" also returned Skyy to the pop charts, where it became a top-50 hit.

An additional single, released between the two above mentioned tunes, "Love All the Way", was also a top-50 R&B hit.

The album itself peaked at No. 16 on the R&B albums chart, Skyy's highest placement in this domain since their most successful album, Skyy Line topped the chart in 1982. It peaked at No. 155 on the pop albums chart.

== Track listing ==
No.	Title	Writer(s)	Length
1.	"Start of a Romance"	Tommy McConnell, Joe Williams	4:48
2.	"Love All the Way"	Randy Muller	4:38
3.	"Sendin' a Message"	Muller	5:00
4.	"Sexy Minded"	McConnell, Maurice Wingate	5:25
5.	"Feelin' it Now"	McConnell, Williams	4:33
6.	"Real Love"	Solomon Roberts, Jr.	5:11
7.	"Let's Touch"	Muller	5:25
8.	"Sunshine"	Muller	4:29
