= Love Light in Flight =

1984 single by Stevie Wonder

Single by Stevie Wonder

from the album The Woman in Red
- B-side: "It's More Than You (Instrumental)"
- Released: November 1984
- Recorded: 1984
- Genre: Funk
- Length: 6:54; 4:36 (single)
- Label: Motown
- Songwriter: Stevie Wonder
- Producer: Stevie Wonder

Stevie Wonder singles chronology
"I Just Called to Say I Love You" (1984)	"Love Light in Flight" (1984)	"Don't Drive Drunk" (1984)

"Love Light in Flight" is a song written, produced, and performed by American R&B singer-songwriter Stevie Wonder. It was released in 1984, from The Woman in Red soundtrack. It peaked at number four on the Billboard Black Singles chart, number one on the RPM Adult Contemporary chart, and number 17 on the Billboard Hot 100 on February 2, 1985.

Cash Box called it a return to "sultry funk" that "is certain to delight those Stevie fans (few though they might be) who found 'I Just Called to Say I Love You' a trifle bland compared to vintage Wonder." Billboard similarly said that "old fans may find this one even more enticing than 'I Just Called...'"

== Personnel ==
- Stevie Wonder - synthesizer, drums, vocals
- Lenny Castro - congas
- Antoinette Wood, Finis Henderson, III, Gene VanBuren, Judy Cheeks, Lynn Davis, Portia Griffin, Susaye Greene, Windy Barnes - backing vocals

== Charts ==
Chart (1984–1985)	Peak position
Belgium (Ultratop 50 Flanders)	27
Canada Adult Contemporary (RPM)	1
Canada Top Singles (RPM)	39
Germany (GfK)	54
New Zealand (Recorded Music NZ)	43
UK Singles (Official Charts)	44
US Adult Contemporary (Billboard)	10
US Billboard Hot 100	17
US Hot R&B/Hip-Hop Songs (Billboard)	4
US Dance Club Songs (Billboard)	6
