= It's Over Now (Luther Vandross song) =

Single by Luther Vandross

from the album The Night I Fell in Love
- Released: 1985 (U.S., Europe)
- Genre: R&B, soul
- Length: 6:09
- Label: Epic Records
- Songwriter(s): Luther Vandross, Marcus Miller
- Producer(s): Luther Vandross, Marcus Miller

Luther Vandross singles chronology
"Til My Baby Comes Home" (1985)	"It's Over Now" (1985)	"Wait for Love" (1985)

"It's Over Now" is a song by American recording artist Luther Vandross released in 1985 as the second single from his album The Night I Fell in Love. The single was a top-five hit on Billboard’s Hot R&B Singles chart.

== Charts ==
Chart (1985)	Peak position
US Billboard Hot R&B Singles	4
US Billboard Hot Dance Club Play	36
