= Real Love (Skyy song) =

Single by Skyy

from the album Start of a Romance
- B-side: "Feelin' It Now"
- Released: November 7, 1989
- Genre: R&B
- Label: Atlantic
- Songwriter: Solomon Roberts

Skyy singles chronology
"Start of a Romance" (1989)	"Real Love" (1989)	"Let's Touch" (1990)

"Real Love" is a song by R&B band Skyy, released in late 1989 from their Start of a Romance album. It spent one week at number one on the R&B singles chart in 1990, and was the second consecutive R&B chart-topper off the album. "Real Love" also charted on the Billboard Hot 100, peaking at number forty-seven.

== See also ==
- R&B number-one hits of 1990 (USA)
