= Ribbon in the Sky =

1982 single by Stevie Wonder

Single by Stevie Wonder

from the album Original Musiquarium I
- B-side: "Black Orchid"
- Released: June 13, 1982
- Recorded: October 1981
- Studio: Wonderland (Los Angeles, California)
- Genre: R&B; soul; jazz; soul jazz; smooth soul
- Length: 5:50
- Label: Tamla
- Songwriter: Stevie Wonder
- Producer: Stevie Wonder

Stevie Wonder singles chronology
"Ebony and Ivory" (1982)	"Ribbon in the Sky" (1982)	"Used To Be" (1982)

"Ribbon in the Sky" is a song by American singer Stevie Wonder. The ballad was first featured on the 1982 greatest hits album, Stevie Wonder's Original Musiquarium I, and charted at No. 54 pop, No. 21 Adult Contemporary, and No. 10 R&B in the US when it was released. The song also charted in the United Kingdom, reaching No. 45.

In February 1983, Wonder was nominated for a Grammy Award for Best Male R&B Vocal Performance at the 25th Grammy Awards.

In 2009, Essence magazine included "Ribbon in the Sky" in their list of the "25 Best Slow Jams of All Time".

Wonder performed a version of the song at Whitney Houston's funeral on February 18, 2012.

== Critical reception ==
Upon its release, "Ribbon in the Sky" received mixed reviews from music critics. Simon Hills of British Record Mirror described the track as a "lush ballad," but felt that Wonder's "breathy vocals" were ultimately "ordinary by his standards." However, Hills noted that the song served as a welcome relief to the artist's recent output, writing that "at least it might kill memories of the awful 'Ebony and Ivory'." He was equally critical of the single's B-side, dismissing "Secret Life of Plants" as "disastrous."

== Personnel ==
- Stevie Wonder – vocals, drums, piano, synthesizers
- Benjamin Bridges – acoustic guitar
