= Skyway (album) =

Studio album by Skyy
- Released: 1980
- Recorded: 1980 at Blanktapes Studios & Music Farm Studios, New York City, New York
- Genre: Soul, urban
- Label: Salsoul
- Producer: Randy Muller, Solomon Roberts, Jr.

Skyy chronology
Skyy (1979)	Skyway (1980)	Skyyport (1980)

Professional ratings
Review scores
Source	Rating
Allmusic	3/5 stars

Skyway is the second album by New York City based group Skyy released in 1980 on Salsoul Records.

== Track listing ==
Side one
No.	Title	Writer(s)	Length
1.	"High"	Randy Muller	5:04
2.	"Skyyzoo"	Solomon Roberts, Jr.	4:55
3.	"Dance"	Roberts, Jr.	4:34
4.	"Don't Stop"	Roberts, Jr.	4:16

Side two
No.	Title	Writer(s)	Length
5.	"Love Plane"	Roberts, Jr.	5:25
6.	"You Got Me Up"	Muller	5:07
7.	"Who's Gonna Love Me"	Roberts, Jr.	3:57
8.	"Music, Music"	Muller	4:35

== Personnel ==
- Randy Muller - Flute, Keyboards, Percussion
- Solomon Roberts, Jr. - Drums, Guitar, Vocals
- Gerald Lebon - Bass
- Tommy McConnell - Drums
- Anibal "Butch" Sierra - Guitar
- Larry Greenberg - Keyboards
- Bonny Dunning, Delores Dunning Milligan, Denise Dunning Crawford - Vocals

=== Additional Personnel ===
- Sandy Billups - Backing Vocals

== Charts ==
=== Weekly charts ===
Chart (1980)	Peak position
US Billboard 200	61
US Top R&B/Hip-Hop Albums (Billboard)	17

=== Year-end charts ===
Chart (1980)	Position
US Top R&B/Hip-Hop Albums (Billboard)	42

=== Singles ===
Year	Single	Chart positions		
Year	Single	US	US R&B	US Dance
1980	"High"	—	13	26
1980	"Skyyzoo"	—	32	41
