= Stevie Wonder's Original Musiquarium I =

1982 compilation album by Stevie Wonder

Greatest hits album by Stevie Wonder
- Released: May 4, 1982
- Recorded: 1971–1982
- Genres: Pop; soul; funk; R&B
- Length: 85:47
- Label: Tamla
- Producer: Stevie Wonder

Stevie Wonder chronology
Hotter than July (1980)	Stevie Wonder's Original Musiquarium I (1982)	The Woman in Red (soundtrack) (1984)

Singles from Stevie Wonder's Original Musiquarium I
- 1. "That Girl" Released: December 30, 1981; 2. "Do I Do" Released: February 19, 1982; 3. "Ribbon in the Sky" Released: June 13, 1982; 4. "Front Line" Released: January 1983

Stevie Wonder's Original Musiquarium I is a compilation album by R&B/soul musician Stevie Wonder that was released in 1982 by Motown Records. It collects eleven Top-40 hit singles and one promotional single, along with four previously unreleased tracks, from 1972 to 1982. The album peaked at No. 4 on the Billboard 200, at No. 1 on the Top R&B Albums chart in the U.S., and went to No. 8 in the UK. It has been certified gold by the RIAA. The four new songs were issued as singles to promote the album, with "That Girl" and "Do I Do" reaching the top 10 and top 20 of the US pop chart and number one and two on the R&B chart, respectively.

== Critical reception ==
Professional ratings
Review scores
Source	Rating
AllMusic	5/5 stars

Robert Palmer of The New York Times described Stevie Wonder's Original Musiquarium as "an impressive album" where "the songs flow into one another and are grouped loosely into four categories - protest funk on Side One, sophisticated ballads and lightly swinging rhythm tunes on Side Two, tributes to various influences and inspirations on Side Three, and dance tunes with jazz-like chord structures on Side Four." Stephen Thomas Erlewine of Allmusic wrote "Wonder remains a quintessential album artist, but this record is a terrific snapshot of the highlights."

== Content ==
Eleven previously released tracks were taken as singles from their respective albums, with "Higher Ground" and "Master Blaster (Jammin')" released before the LP. "Isn't She Lovely" was not released as a single from Songs in the Key of Life, while "Superstition", "You Are the Sunshine of My Life", "You Haven't Done Nothin'", "I Wish", and "Sir Duke" all topped the Billboard Hot 100. "Living for the City" and "Boogie On Reggae Woman" appear in slightly different versions to those on their albums, and "You Are the Sunshine of My Life" is the single mix with the horns added.

The double album covers Wonder's "classic period" running from 1972 to 1980, compiling tracks that appeared on every album from Music of My Mind through Hotter than July. It also included four new songs, each tagged on as the last track on each album side: "Front Line"; "Ribbon in the Sky"; "That Girl"; and "Do I Do". The latter track features a solo by bebop jazz trumpeter Dizzy Gillespie. The album's title is a portmanteau of "music" and "aquarium".

== Track listing ==
All songs written by Stevie Wonder except "Front Line" by Wonder and Gary Byrd.

Side one
No.	Title	Album	Length
1.	"Superstition"	Talking Book (1972)	4:25
2.	"You Haven't Done Nothin'"	Fulfillingness' First Finale (1974)	3:29
3.	"Living for the City"	Innervisions (1973)	7:26
4.	"Front Line"	Previously unreleased	5:55
Total length:			21:15

Side two
No.	Title	Album	Length
1.	"Superwoman (Where Were You When I Needed You)"	Music of My Mind (1972)	7:57
2.	"Send One Your Love"	Stevie Wonder's Journey Through "The Secret Life of Plants" (1979)	4:02
3.	"You Are the Sunshine of My Life"	Talking Book (1972)	2:51
4.	"Ribbon in the Sky"	Previously unreleased	5:35
Total length:			20:25

Side three
No.	Title	Album	Length
1.	"Higher Ground"	Innervisions (1973)	3:46
2.	"Sir Duke"	Songs in the Key of Life (1976)	3:52
3.	"Master Blaster (Jammin')"	Hotter than July (1980)	5:08
4.	"Boogie On Reggae Woman"	Fulfillingness' First Finale (1974)	4:55
5.	"That Girl"	Previously unreleased	5:15
Total length:			22:56

Side four
No.	Title	Album	Length
1.	"I Wish"	Songs in the Key of Life (1976)	4:12
2.	"Isn't She Lovely"	Songs in the Key of Life (1976)	6:32
3.	"Do I Do"	Previously unreleased	10:27
Total length:			21:11

== Charts ==
=== Weekly charts ===
Chart (1982–1983)	Peak position
Australian Albums (Kent Music Report)	9
Austrian Albums (Ö3 Austria)	15
Canada Top Albums/CDs (RPM)	18
Dutch Albums (Album Top 100)	15
German Albums (Offizielle Top 100)	33
New Zealand Albums (RMNZ)	5
Swedish Albums (Sverigetopplistan)	19
UK Albums (Official Charts)	8
US Billboard 200	4
US Top R&B/Hip-Hop Albums (Billboard)	1

=== Year-end charts ===
Chart (1982)	Position
New Zealand Albums (RMNZ)	26
US Billboard 200	86
US Top R&B/Hip-Hop Albums (Billboard)	14

== Certifications ==
Region	Certification	Certified units/sales
Australia (ARIA)	Gold	35,000^{^}
New Zealand (RMNZ)	Gold	7,500^{^}
United Kingdom (BPI)	Gold	100,000^{^}
United States (RIAA)	Gold	500,000^{^}
^{^} Shipments figures based on certification alone.

== See also ==
- List of number-one R&B albums of 1982 (U.S.)
