= Wait for Love (song) =

Single by Luther Vandross

from the album The Night I Fell in Love
- Released: August 1985 (U.S., Europe)
- Recorded: 1985
- Genre: R&B
- Length: 5:16
- Label: Epic
- Songwriter(s): Luther Vandross; Nat Adderley, Jr.
- Producer(s): Luther Vandross; Marcus Miller

Luther Vandross singles chronology
"It's Over Now" (1985)	"Wait for Love" (1985)	"Give Me the Reason" (1986)

"Wait for Love" is a 1985 song by American recording artist Luther Vandross released in 1985. The song was released as a single to support his album The Night I Fell in Love. The single peaked to eleven on Billboards Hot R&B Singles chart. Vandross performed the song on the November 22, 1986 episode of Soul Train and on the BET Walk of Fame in 2000.

== Charts ==
Chart (1985)	Peak position
US Billboard Hot R&B Singles	11
