= Skyy Line =

Studio album by Skyy
- Released: 1981
- Recorded: 1981
- Genre: Urban, post-disco
- Length: 37:02
- Label: Salsoul/RCA
- Producer: Randy Muller, Solomon Roberts, Jr.

Skyy chronology
Skyyport (1980)	Skyy Line (1981)	Skyyjammer (1982)

Professional ratings
Review scores
Source	Rating
Allmusic	3/5 stars
Robert Christgau	B−

Skyy Line is the fourth album by New York City-based group Skyy, released in 1981 on Salsoul Records.

== Track listing ==
No.	Title	Writer(s)	Length
1.	"Let's Celebrate"	Tommy McConnell	5:32
2.	"Call Me"	Randy Muller	6:21
3.	"Girl In Blue"	Muller	4:24
4.	"Jam The Box"	Solomon Roberts Jr.	4:54
5.	"When You Touch Me"	Roberts Jr.	3:38
6.	"Gonna Get It On"	Roberts Jr, Gerald Lebon	4:13
7.	"Get Into The Beat"	Muller	4:28

== Personnel ==
- Randy Muller - Flute, Keyboards, Percussion
- Solomon Roberts Jr. - Guitar, Vocals
- Gerald Lebon - Bass
- Tommy McConnell - Drums
- Anibal "Butch" Sierra - Guitar
- Larry Greenberg - Keyboards
- Bonny Dunning, Delores Dunning Milligan, Denise Dunning Crawford - Vocals

== Charts ==
=== Weekly charts ===
Chart (1981–1982)	Peak position
US Billboard 200	18
US Top R&B/Hip-Hop Albums (Billboard)	1

=== Year-end charts ===
Chart (1982)	Position
US Billboard 200	57
US Top R&B/Hip-Hop Albums (Billboard)	5

=== Singles ===
Year	Single	Peak chart positions		
Year	Single	US	US R&B	US Dan
1981	"Call Me"	26	1	3
1982	"Let's Celebrate"	—	16	—
1982	"When You Touch Me"	—	43	—

== See also ==
- List of number-one R&B albums of 1982 (U.S.)
