= Busy Body (album) =

Studio album by Luther Vandross
- Released: November 25, 1983
- Recorded: February–August 1983
- Studios: Mediasound Studios (New York City, New York); Minot Sound (White Plains, New York); Warner Bros. Studios (Burbank, California); Westlake Studios, (Los Angeles, California)
- Genres: R&B; soul; quiet storm
- Length: 41:24
- Label: Epic
- Producers: Luther Vandross; Marcus Miller

Luther Vandross chronology
Forever, for Always, for Love (1982)	Busy Body (1983)	The Night I Fell in Love (1985)

Singles from Busy Body
- 1. "How Many Times Can We Say Goodbye" Released: November 1983; 2. "I’ll Let You Slide" Released: December 1983; 3. "Superstar" Released: March 1984; 4. "Make Me a Believer" Released: May 1984

Professional ratings
Review scores
Source	Rating
AllMusic	4/5 stars
Chicago Tribune	2.5/4 stars
Robert Christgau	C+
Rolling Stone	4/5 stars

Busy Body is the third studio album by American R&B/soul singer-songwriter Luther Vandross, released on November 25, 1983. It hit the number one position on the US Billboard Top R&B/Hip-Hop Albums chart in the week of April 13, 1984 and was certified Platinum by the RIAA in January 1985.

== Track listing ==
Side A
No.	Title	Writer(s)	Length
1.	"I Wanted Your Love"	Luther Vandross, Marcus Miller	5:42
2.	"Busy Body"	Vandross, Miller	4:45
3.	"I'll Let You Slide"	Vandross, Miller	5:21
4.	"Make Me a Believer"	Vandross, Nat Adderley, Jr.	5:26

Side B
No.	Title	Writer(s)	Length
5.	"For the Sweetness of Your Love"	Vandross, Miller	7:28
6.	"How Many Times Can We Say Goodbye?" (Duet with Dionne Warwick)	Steve Goldman	3:25
7.	"Superstar/Until You Come Back to Me (That's What I'm Gonna Do)"	Leon Russell, Bonnie Bramlett, Morris Broadnax, Clarence Paul, Stevie Wonder	9:18

== Personnel ==
- Luther Vandross – lead vocals (1–3, 5–7), backing vocals (1–3, 5–7), all vocals (4), vocal arrangements
- Nat Adderley, Jr. – keyboards, string arrangements (2, 7), horn arrangements (4, 7), rhythm and synthesizer arrangements (4, 6, 7)
- Marcus Miller – synthesizers (1–5, 7), bass guitar, rhythm and synthesizer arrangements (1–3, 5)
- John "Skip" Anderson – synthesizers (4, 6, 7)
- Doc Powell – guitars
- Georg Wadenius – guitars
- Yogi Horton – drums
- Paulinho da Costa – percussion
- Michael White – percussion (7)
- Steve Kroon – congas (1, 3, 5–7), bongos (2, 4)
- Jimmy Webb – horn and string arrangements (6)
- Alfred Brown – horn and string contractor (2, 4, 6, 7)
- Tawatha Agee – backing vocals (1–3, 5, 7)
- Phillip Ballou – backing vocals (1, 2, 5–7)
- Robin Clark – backing vocals (1–3, 5, 7)
- Fonzi Thornton – backing vocals (1, 5)
- Brenda White King – backing vocals (1–3, 5–7)
- Alfa Anderson – backing vocals (2, 3, 6)
- Cissy Houston – backing vocals (2, 6)
- David Lasley – backing vocals (3, 5)
- Darlene Love – backing vocals (3, 5)
- Cheryl Lynn – backing vocals (3, 5)
- Paulette McWilliams – backing vocals (3, 5)
- Yvonne Lewis – backing vocals (5, 6)
- Patti Austin – backing vocals (6)
- Michelle Cobbs – backing vocals (6)
- Dionne Warwick – lead vocals (6)

=== Production ===
- Larkin Arnold – executive producer
- Marcus Miller – producer (1–3, 5)
- Luther Vandross – producer
- Ray Bardani – recording, mixing
- Michael Barbiero – additional engineer
- Carl Beatty – additional engineer
- Michael Christopher – additional engineer, assistant engineer
- Paul Brown – assistant engineer
- Rudy Hill – assistant engineer
- Bruce Robbins – assistant engineer
- Harry Spiridakis – assistant engineer
- Steve Bates – mix assistant
- Greg Calbi – mastering at Sterling Sound (New York, NY)
- Kate Jansen – album administrator
- Dana Lester – album administrator
- George Corsillo – art direction, design
- Brian Hagiwara – front and back photography
- Harry Langdon – photography of Luther Vandross
- Shep Gordon – management
- Daniel S. Markus – management
- Alive Enterprises, Inc. – management company

== Charts ==
=== Weekly charts ===
Chart (1983)	Peak position
UK Albums (Official Charts)	42
US Billboard 200	32
US Top R&B/Hip-Hop Albums (Billboard)	1

=== Year-end charts ===
Chart (1984)	Position
US Top R&B/Hip-Hop Albums (Billboard)	4

== Certifications ==
Region	Certification	Certified units/sales
United States (RIAA)	Platinum	1,000,000^{^}
^{^} Shipments figures based on certification alone.
