= That Girl (Stevie Wonder song) =

Single by Stevie Wonder

from the album Stevie Wonder's Original Musiquarium I
- B-side: "All I Do"
- Released: December 30, 1981
- Recorded: Fall 1981
- Studio: Wonderland (Los Angeles, California)
- Genre: R&B
- Length: 5:13
- Label: Tamla
- Songwriter: Stevie Wonder
- Producer: Stevie Wonder

Stevie Wonder singles chronology
"Did I Hear You Say You Love Me" (1981)	"That Girl" (1981)	"Do I Do" (1982)

"That Girl" is a song by American R&B singer and songwriter Stevie Wonder. It was the leading single from Wonder's 1982 greatest-hits compilation, Stevie Wonder's Original Musiquarium I, as one of four new songs from the collection. The song spent nine weeks at number one on the Billboard R&B singles chart, the longest time a Stevie Wonder single spent at the top spot. It also peaked at number four on the Billboard Hot 100 for three consecutive weeks from March 20 to April 3, 1982.

In 2024, "That Girl" was ranked #39 on Rolling Stone's list of the 50 best Stevie Wonder songs.

== Charts ==
=== Weekly charts ===
Chart (1982)	Peak position
Belgium (Ultratop)	20
Canada Top Singles (RPM)	16
Canada Adult Contemporary (RPM)	4
Finland (Suomen virallinen lista)	14
Netherlands (Single Top 100)	42
New Zealand (Listener)	20
Poland (LP3)	17
UK Singles (OCC)	39
US Adult Contemporary (Billboard)	10
US Billboard Hot 100	4
US Hot R&B/Hip-Hop Songs (Billboard)	1
US Dance Club Songs (Billboard)	27
US Cash Box Top 100	1

=== Year-end charts ===
Chart (1982)	Rank
US Billboard Hot 100	43
US Cash Box Top 100	12

== Other versions ==
The song was covered by Peter Sprague and Leonard Patton on their Dreamwalkin' album. The song was sampled into other recordings, most notably:

- Jade - "Don't Walk Away"
- Tupac Shakur - "So Many Tears"
- Queen Latifah - "Let Her Live"

== See also ==
- List of number-one R&B singles of 1982 (U.S.)
- List of Cash Box Top 100 number-one singles of 1982
