= Til My Baby Comes Home =

Single by Luther Vandross

from the album The Night I Fell in Love
- Released: January 1985 (U.S., Europe)
- Genre: R&B, soul
- Length: 5:30
- Label: Epic
- Songwriters: Luther Vandross, Marcus Miller
- Producers: Luther Vandross, Marcus Miller

Luther Vandross singles chronology
"Superstar/Until You Come Back to Me (That's What I'm Gonna Do)" (1984)	"Til My Baby Comes Home" (1985)	"It's Over Now" (1985)

"Til My Baby Comes Home" is a song by American recording artist Luther Vandross released in 1985 as the lead single in support of his platinum album The Night I Fell in Love.

== Background ==
- The song features an organ solo performed by musician Billy Preston.

== Charts ==
Following its release, Vandross charted five top-five singles when the song peaked to #4 on Billboards Hot R&B Singles chart. The song also became his second top 30 on Billboard's Hot 100.

Chart (1985)	Peak position
US Billboard Hot 100	29
US Billboard Hot R&B Singles	4
