= The Woman in Red (soundtrack) =

1984 soundtrack album by Stevie Wonder and Dionne Warwick

Soundtrack album by Stevie Wonder and Dionne Warwick
- Released: August 28, 1984
- Recorded: 1983–1984
- Genres: R&B; soul; funk; pop
- Length: 41:19
- Label: Motown
- Producers: Stevie Wonder; Gary Olazabal

Stevie Wonder chronology
Stevie Wonder's Original Musiquarium I (1982)	The Woman in Red (1984)	In Square Circle (1985)

Dionne Warwick chronology
How Many Times Can We Say Goodbye (1983)	The Woman in Red (1984)	Finder of Lost Loves (1985)

Singles from The Woman in Red
- 1. "I Just Called to Say I Love You" Released: August 1, 1984; 2. "Love Light in Flight" Released: November 1984

Professional ratings
Review scores
Source	Rating
AllMusic	3/5 stars
Robert Christgau	B+
The Rolling Stone Album Guide	3.5/5 stars

The Woman in Red: Original Motion Picture Soundtrack is the second soundtrack album released by American musician Stevie Wonder on the Motown label. Also featuring Dionne Warwick, the album was released in 1984 for the film of the same name (starring Gene Wilder). It features Wonder's biggest hit, "I Just Called to Say I Love You", which hit number one internationally and won the Academy Award for Best Original Song, and also features the follow-up hit, "Love Light in Flight" (a US top-20 hit) and "Don't Drive Drunk", the song and the accompanying music video for which were used in the Ad Council and the US Department of Transportation's Drunk Driving Prevention public service announcement the following year.

== Track listing ==
All songs written by Stevie Wonder, except where indicated.

Side one
No.	Title	Writer(s)	Length
1.	"The Woman in Red"		4:38
2.	"It's You" (duet with Dionne Warwick)		4:56
3.	"It's More Than You"	Ben Bridges	3:15
4.	"I Just Called to Say I Love You"		6:17

Side two
No.	Title	Length
1.	"Love Light in Flight"	6:54
2.	"Moments Aren't Moments" (solo by Dionne Warwick)	4:33
3.	"Weakness" (duet with Dionne Warwick)	4:13
4.	"Don't Drive Drunk"	6:33

- Note: Later pressings of the compact disc have the single version of "I Just Called to Say I Love You", due to its popularity.

== Personnel ==
- Stevie Wonder – piano, synthesizers, drums, harmonica, vocoder, lead vocals, backing vocals (1–5, 7–8)
- Dionne Warwick – lead vocals (2, 6–7)
- Nathan Watts – bass guitar (2–3,7)
- James Allen – drums (2,7)
- Isaiah Sanders – piano, synthesizer, drums (3,7)
- Ben Bridges – electric guitar (3)
- Lenny Castro – congas (5)
- Larry Gittens – trumpet (6)
- Bob Malach – saxophone (7)

== Commercial performance ==
The album reached number four on the US Billboard 200 chart, number one on the R&B Albums chart (for four weeks) and number two on the UK Albums Chart, where it was kept off the top spot by the albums Now That's What I Call Music 3 and David Bowie's Tonight. Wonder's albums Songs in the Key of Life and Hotter than July also reached number two in the UK and to date he has failed to achieve a number-one album there. However, the single "I Just Called to Say I Love You", taken from The Woman in Red, was a massive hit in the UK, reaching number one and becoming the second best-selling single of 1984 (only behind Band Aid's "Do They Know It's Christmas?") and the third most successful single of the entire 1980s there.

== Charts ==
=== Weekly charts ===
Weekly chart performance for The Woman in Red soundtrack
Chart (1984–1985)	Peak position
Australian Albums (Kent Music Report)	4
Austrian Albums (Ö3 Austria)	2
Canadian Albums (RPM)	4
Dutch Albums (Album Top 100)	2
Japanese Albums (Oricon)	5
New Zealand Albums (RMNZ)	4
Norwegian Albums (VG-lista)	1
Spanish Albums (AFYVE)	1
Swedish Albums (Sverigetopplistan)	1
Swiss Albums (Schweizer Hitparade)	2
UK Albums (Official Charts)	2
US Billboard 200	4
West German Albums (Media Control)	3

=== Year-end charts ===
Year-end chart performance for The Woman in Red soundtrack
Chart (1984)	Position
Australian Albums Chart	51
Austrian Albums Chart	24
Canadian Albums Chart	19
Dutch Albums Chart	27
New Zealand Albums (RMNZ)	48
Spanish Albums Chart	6
UK Albums Chart	30
Chart (1985)	Position
Canadian Albums Chart	83
Japanese Albums Chart	49
Spanish Albums Chart	5
US Billboard 200	53

== Certifications and sales ==
Certifications and sales for The Woman in Red soundtrack
Region	Certification	Certified units/sales
Canada (Music Canada)	2× Platinum	200,000^{^}
Finland (Musiikkituottajat)	Platinum	53,626
Germany (BVMI)	Gold	250,000^{^}
Japan (Oricon)	—	286,000
Hong Kong (IFPI Hong Kong)	Platinum	20,000^{*}
Netherlands (NVPI)	Gold	50,000^{^}
New Zealand (RMNZ)	Gold	7,500^{^}
Portugal (AFP)	Gold	70,000
Spain (Promusicae)	Gold	300,000
United Kingdom (BPI)	Platinum	300,000^{^}
United States (RIAA)	Platinum	1,000,000^{^}
^{*} Sales figures based on certification alone.^{^} Shipments figures based on certification alone.

== Accolades ==
Award	Category	Song	Recipient	Result	Ref.
Academy Awards	Best Original Song	"I Just Called to Say I Love You"	Stevie Wonder	Won	
British Academy Film Awards	Best Original Song Written for a Film	"I Just Called to Say I Love You"	Stevie Wonder	Nominated	
Golden Globe Awards	Best Original Song	"I Just Called to Say I Love You"	Stevie Wonder	Won	
Grammy Awards	Song of the Year	"I Just Called to Say I Love You"	Stevie Wonder	Nominated	
Grammy Awards	Best Pop Vocal Performance, Male	"I Just Called to Say I Love You"	Stevie Wonder	Nominated	
Grammy Awards	Best Pop Instrumental Performance	"I Just Called to Say I Love You"	Stevie Wonder	Nominated	
Grammy Awards	Best R&B Vocal Performance, Male	The Woman in Red	Stevie Wonder	Nominated	

== See also ==
- List of Billboard number-one R&B albums of 1984
