= Start of a Romance (song) =

Single by Skyy

from the album Start of a Romance
- B-side: "Sunshine"
- Released: 1989
- Genre: R&B
- Label: Atlantic
- Songwriters: Tommy McConnell; Joe Williams

Skyy singles chronology
"Love All the Way" (1989)	"Start of a Romance" (1989)	"Real Love" (1989)

"Start of a Romance" is a 1989 single by Skyy and the title track of its 1989 album. The single was the group’s first to place on the Hot Black Singles chart in almost two years. "Start of a Romance" peaked at number one on the Black Singles for two weeks, its first number one since 1982. Although the single did not chart on the Hot 100, it peaked at number forty-one on the dance charts. It was the first of two number one hits from the Start of a Romance album.
