= Call Me (Skyy song) =

1981 single by Skyy

Single by Skyy

from the album Skyy Line
- B-side: "When You Touch Me"
- Released: 1981
- Genre: Post-disco
- Length: 6:21 (12" version)
- Label: Salsoul
- Songwriter: Randy Muller

Skyy singles chronology
"For the First Time" (1981)	"Call Me" (1981)	"Let's Celebrate" (1982)

"Call Me" is a 1981 single by Brooklyn-based funk group Skyy. A popular R&B and dance hit, the single achieved mainstream success by peaking at number twenty-six on the Billboard Hot 100. It was one of only two singles Skyy placed on that chart.

== Track listing ==
Promo 12" vinyl

- US: Salsoul / SG-356
- US: Salsoul / SG-356 DJ

Side A
No.	Title	Length
1.	"Call Me"	6:21

Side B
No.	Title	Length
2.	"Call Me"	6:21

== Chart performance ==
Chart (1982)	Peak position
US Billboard Hot 100	26
US Billboard Black Singles	1
US Billboard Hot Dance Music/Club Play	3

== See also ==
- List of number-one R&B singles of 1982 (U.S.)
