= Skyyport =

Studio album by Skyy
- Released: 1980
- Recorded: 1980
- Genre: Soul, urban
- Label: Salsoul
- Producer: Randy Muller, Solomon Roberts, Jr.

Skyy chronology
Skyway (1980)	Skyyport (1980)	Skyy Line (1981)

Professional ratings
Review scores
Source	Rating
Allmusic	4/5 stars

Skyyport is the third album by New York City based group Skyy released in 1980 on Salsoul Records.

== Track listing ==
No.	Title	Length
1.	"Here's To You"	5:22
2.	"I Can't Get Enough"	5:05
3.	"Superlove"	5:08
4.	"No Music"	2:19
5.	"Easy"	5:18
6.	"Sun Won't Shine"	4:30
7.	"For The First Time"	4:03
8.	"Arrival"	4:06

== Personnel ==
- Randy Muller - Flute, Keyboards, Percussion
- Solomon Roberts Jr. - Drums, Guitar, Vocals
- Gerald Lebon - Bass
- Tommy McConnell - Drums
- Anibal "Butch" Sierra - Guitar
- Larry Greenberg - Keyboards
- Bonny Dunning, Delores Dunning Milligan, Denise Dunning Crawford - Vocals

== Charts ==
=== Weekly charts ===
Chart (1981)	Peak position
US Billboard 200	85
US Top R&B/Hip-Hop Albums (Billboard)	16

=== Year-end charts ===
Chart (1981)	Position
US Top R&B/Hip-Hop Albums (Billboard)	33

=== Singles ===
Year	Single	Chart positions		
Year	Single	US	US R&B	US Dance
1981	"Here's To You"	—	23	24
1981	"Superlove"	—	31	—
