= Do I Do =

1982 single by Stevie Wonder

Single by Stevie Wonder

from the album Stevie Wonder's Original Musiquarium I
- B-side: "Rocket Love"
- Released: February 19, 1982
- Recorded: 1981
- Genre: Post-disco; funk
- Length: 5:02 (single version); 10:30 (album version)
- Label: Tamla
- Songwriter: Stevie Wonder
- Producer: Stevie Wonder

Stevie Wonder singles chronology
"That Girl" (1981)	"Do I Do" (1982)	"Ebony and Ivory" (1982)

Alternative covers
- Alternate 7-Inch single cover

"Do I Do" is a song written and performed by American singer and songwriter Stevie Wonder, first released on the compilation album Stevie Wonder's Original Musiquarium I in 1982. The single peaked at #2 on the US Billboard soul chart and #13 on the Billboard Hot 100. On the Billboard dance chart, "Do I Do" reached number one for two weeks. It reached #10 in the UK.

== Background ==
The album version of the song is ten and a half minutes long and features a rare example of Wonder rapping near the end of the track. Dizzy Gillespie also appears on the track with a trumpet solo. Both of these elements are omitted from the single edit of the song (some longer edits retain the Gillespie solo but exclude the rapping). Wonder audibly counts down at the end of the track. The song is noted by bassists for its intricate bassline, played by Nathan Watts. A commercial success, it received three Grammy Award nominations including for Best Male R&B Vocal Performance and Best R&B Song. The song became the basis for Ja Rule's "Livin' It Up."

== Personnel ==
- Stevie Wonder – lead vocals, piano, harmonica (uncredited in initial liner notes; credited in 2000 reissue), horn arrangements
- Dizzy Gillespie – trumpet
- Nathan Lamar Watts – bass
- Dennis Davis – drums
- Earl DeRouen – percussion
- Rick Zunigar, Benjamin Bridges – guitars
- Isaiah Sanders – Fender Rhodes
- Windy Barnes, Melody McCullough, Shirley Brewer, Alexandra Brown – background vocals
- Eugene Ghee, Janice Robinson, Britt Woodman, Virgil Jones, Anthony Tooley, Victor Paz, Clifton Anderson, Earl McIntyre, Frank Wess, Robert Rutledge, Lorenzo Wyche, J. D. Parran, Robert Eldridge, Alfred Wilson, Larry Gittens – horns
- Paul Riser – string arrangements

== Charts ==
=== Weekly charts ===
Chart (1982–83)	Peak position
Finland (Suomen virallinen lista)	11
Ireland (IRMA)	8
UK Singles (OCC)	10
US Billboard Hot 100	13
US Hot Dance Club Play (Billboard)	1
US Hot Black Singles (Billboard)	2
US Adult Contemporary (Billboard)	25

=== Year-end charts ===
Chart (1982)	Rank
US Top Pop Singles (Billboard)	95

== See also ==
- List of number-one dance singles of 1982 (U.S.)
- List of post-disco artists and songs
