= Richard "Dimples" Fields =

American singer (1942–2000)

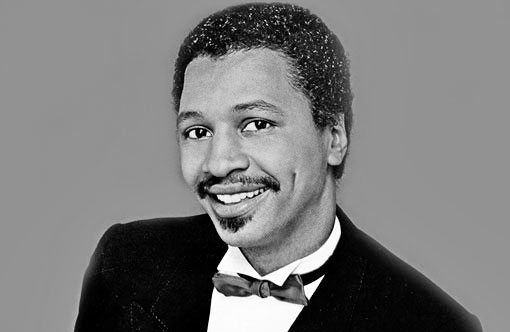
- Richard "Dimples" Fields aka "Mr. Look So Good"

Background information
- Born: March 21, 1942; New Orleans, Louisiana, U.S.
- Died: January 12, 2000 (aged 57) Novato, California, U.S.
- Genres: R&B; soul
- Occupations: Singer; songwriter; producer
- Instruments: Vocals
- Years active: 1973–2000
- Labels: Boardwalk; RCA; Columbia

Richard "Dimples" Fields (March 21, 1942 – January 12, 2000) was an American R&B and soul singer, popular during the 1980s.

== Career ==
Richard "Dimples" Fields was born in New Orleans, Louisiana. He attended Greenville Park School in Hammond, Louisiana. At the age of 9, he moved to Oakland, California with his family.

Field began singing professionally in the early 1970s, purchasing an Oakland cabaret, the Cold Duck Music Lounge, where he headlined. He took his nickname, "Dimples", from a female admirer who remarked that he was always smiling. He began recording for his own DRK label, before signing to Boardwalk Records in 1981. His first minor hit was a cover of The Penguins' "Earth Angel" that year. His first album for Boardwalk also featured the track "She's Got Papers On Me", the lament of a married man wanting his mistress, which was interrupted by his wife, played by Betty Wright, setting out her view of the situation.

Fields' breakthrough single came in 1982 with "If It Ain't One Thing, It's Another", which reached number one for three weeks on the US Billboard R&B chart and number 47 on the Billboard Hot 100. He had first recorded and released the song for DRK in 1975, in which he lamented not only the world's problems, but also those of his own life (from an ugly pregnant girlfriend to the need to read the Bible). Fields was persuaded to re-record and update it by an old friend, including it on his album Mr. Look So Good!, before it was issued as a single. His only entry in the UK Singles Chart occurred in February 1982, when "I've Got to Learn to Say No" peaked at number 56. This song was reworked by George Michael as "Learn to Say No" as a duet with Jody Watley.

While Fields had moderate success on the US R&B chart, both under his name and his nickname, "Dimples", "If It Ain't One Thing, It's Another" was his only Billboard Hot 100 entry. His other big seller was "Your Wife Is Cheating On Us".

He had several less successful follow-ups before Boardwalk Records folded in 1983. He then signed with RCA Records, but was dropped by the label after releasing two unsuccessful albums. Renamed simply "Dimples", he continued to record for the Columbia and Life record labels. He also worked as a record producer with 9.9, and The Ohio Players among others.

Fields died at the Novato Community Hospital in Novato, California, in January 2000, at the age of 57, as the result of a stroke. He is buried at Holly Gardens Cemetery in Hammond, Louisiana.

== Discography ==
=== Albums ===
Year	Title	Peak chart positions		Record label
Year	Title	US	US R&B	Record label
1973	It's Finger Lickin' Good	―	―	Dat Richfield Kat
1974	Spoiled Rotten!	—	―	Dat Richfield Kat
1977	Ready for Anything	―	―	Dat Richfield Kat
1981	Dimples	33	5	Boardwalk
1982	Mr. Look So Good!	63	3	Boardwalk
1982	Give Everybody Some!	―	40	Boardwalk
1984	Mmm...	―	51	RCA Victor
1985	Dark Gable	―	―	RCA Victor
1987	Tellin' It Like It Is	―	―	Columbia
1990	Dimples	―	―	Life Records
"—" denotes releases that did not chart.

=== Singles ===
Year	Title	Peak chart positions			Album
Year	Title	US	US R&B	UK	Album
1981	"She's Got Papers on Me"	―	—	—	Dimples
1981	"Earth Angel"	―	81	―	Dimples
1981	"I've Got to Learn to Say No!"	―	42	56	Dimples
1982	"If It Ain't One Thing...It's Another"	47	1	―	Mr. Look So Good!
1982	"Taking Applications"	―	35	―	Mr. Look So Good!
1982	"People Treat You Funky (When Ya Ain't Got No Money!)"	―	32	―	Give Everybody Some!
1983	"Don't Ever Stop Chasing Your Dreams (Pt.1)"	―	51	―	Give Everybody Some!
1984	"Your Wife Is Cheatin' on Us"	―	32	99	Mmm...
1984	"Jazzy Lady"	―	63	―	Mmm...
1985	"Shake 'Em Down"	―	54	―	Dark Gable
1987	"I Can't Live with or without You"	―	43	―	Tellin' It Like It Is
1987	"Tell It Like It Is"	―	22	―	Tellin' It Like It Is
1991	"They're Tryin' to Take Your Job"	―	67	―	Dimples
"—" denotes releases that did not chart or were not released in that territory.
