= Alfa Anderson =

American singer and educator (1946–2024)

- Anderson in 2015
- Born: September 7, 1946; Augusta, Georgia, U.S.
- Died: December 17, 2024 (aged 78)
- Education: Paine College; Teachers College, Columbia University
- Occupations: Singer; Educator
- Spouse: Eluriel "Tinkr" Barfield

Alfa Anderson (September 7, 1946 – December 17, 2024) was an American singer and educator, best known as one of the lead vocalists of the 1970s band Chic.

== Early life and education ==
Anderson was born in Augusta, Georgia, on September 7, 1946. Her parents named her "Alfa" (from "alpha" the first letter of the Greek alphabet, with the "ph" changed to an "f" in honor of her father's name, Alfonso), because she was their first born child. Musically inclined from a young age, Anderson composed her first song at age three.

Although Anderson showed early talent for music, she pursued a traditional education path. She attended Paine College, followed by Teachers College, Columbia University, where she earned a master's degree in English. She sang in the college choirs of both Paine and Columbia.

== Career ==
=== Early career ===
In 1976, Anderson made her professional debut in Cannonball Adderley's "Big Man — The Legend of John-Henry" sponsored by the Newport Jazz Festival at Carnegie Hall. Her second professional appearance was at Lincoln Center, where she performed in "Children of the Fire" (1974), written by "Hannibal" Marvin Peterson.

Anderson worked as a lecturer at Hunter College in New York City while singing on weekends with Kenny and Everett Brawner, founders of the band, "Raw Sugar". This led to work with other bands, such as Lou Courtney and Buffalo Smoke, where she met Ednah Holt, and later Fonzi Thornton and Michelle Cobbs. Holt introduced Anderson to Luther Vandross, who at the time sang backup for various groups.

Anderson recorded background vocals for Nat Adderley, Roy Buchanan, Dionne Warwick, Odyssey and many others. Her voice appears on the soundtrack to The Wiz (produced by Quincy Jones, 1978) and Atlantic Records' Live at Montreux (produced by Arif Mardin and Herbie Mann in 1978).

=== Chic years ===
In 1977, Vandross encouraged Anderson to audition as a background vocalist for Chic, a new band created by Nile Rodgers and Bernard Edwards. Anderson's and Vandross's background vocals appear on the eponymous debut album Chic, which contained the number one hit "Dance, Dance, Dance" and the Billboard charted "Everybody Dance".

Anderson became a lead singer when one of Chic's original leads, Norma Jean Wright, left the group in 1978. Along with fellow lead Luci Martin, Chic would go on to produce many more charted hits, including the multi platinum "Le Freak" (1978) and "Good Times" (1979), as well as "My Forbidden Lover" (1979). Anderson is the lead vocalist for the top ten hit "I Want Your Love" (1978) and "At Last I Am Free" (1978).

At the height of Chic's fame, Anderson regularly appeared on television shows such as Soul Train, The Midnight Special, and Top of the Pops. She also worked on the Chic-produced sessions of Sister Sledge's "We Are Family" (1979), Diana Ross's Diana (1980), and Johnny Mathis's I Love My Lady (1981).

In 1983, Rodgers and Edwards dissolved the original Chic band. During this time, Anderson began touring internationally with Luther Vandross and from 1982 until 1987, performing with him at venues such as Wembley Stadium in London.

Anderson continued to work with other notable artists, appearing on albums by Bryan Adams, Gregory Hines, Mick Jagger, Teddy Pendergrass, Jennifer Holliday, Billy Squier, Sheena Easton, Jody Watley, Bryan Ferry, and Jonathan Butler.

=== Return to education ===
Anderson earned a second master's degree in educational leadership from Bank Street College in New York, New York. In the 1990s, she became a principal at El Puente Academy for Peace and Justice High School in New York, New York.

== Later work ==
Anderson continued to record and perform. She released the single "Former First Lady of Chic" in 2013 and the album Music from My Heart in 2017.

Anderson toured internationally with a trio she formed with former Chic members Norma Jean Wright and Luci Martin. In 2016, the group sang with Aristofreeks and guest vocalist Kathy Sledge on the song "Get on Up", which reached #2 on Billboard's Club Chart.

Nile Rodgers recreated Chic with new vocalists in 1992. Anderson and Luci Martin appear on the Chic track "I'll Be There" (2015). The song reached number one on Billboard's Hot Dance Club Songs chart.

== Personal life and death ==
Alfa Anderson was married to producer, composer, and bass player Eluriel "Tinkr" Barfield, whom she met while touring with Vandross. In addition to Vandross, Barfield has recorded or performed with Lou Rawls, The B-52's, Jaheim, Roberta Flack, The Roches, Marvin Sease, Doc Powell, Martha Wash, Debbie Gibson, Jennifer Holliday, Ashford and Simpson, as well as many other celebrated artists.

Anderson and Barfield formed a group named Voices of Shalom, dedicated to exploring spiritual themes through original compositions. They released two albums: Messages (1999) and Daily Bread (2005). A single, released in 2005, called "What a Spirit", features Lisa Fischer and Keith Anthony Fluitt.

Anderson died on December 17, 2024, at the age of 78.

== Accolades ==
In 2014, Anderson received the Global Entertainment Media Arts (G.E.M.A.) Foundation's Golden Mic Award as well as a Citation from the City of Philadelphia for her contributions to music.

"Le Freak", featuring Anderson on the lead vocals, was inducted into the 2015 Grammy Hall of Fame. In 2018, the song was added to the National Recording Registry by the Library of Congress.

In 2018, Mayor Hardie Davis Jr. of Augusta, Georgia gave Anderson the Keys to the City and declared May 5 as Alfa Anderson Day.
