= Skyy (band) =

American rhythm and blues group

- Also known as: New York Skyy
- Origin: New York City, United States
- Genres: Disco, R&B, funk, boogie
- Years active: 1977–1993
- Labels: Salsoul, Capitol, Atlantic
- Past members: Solomon Roberts Jr. Anibal "Butch" Sierra; Gerald Lebon; Tommy McConnell; Larry Greenberg; Denise Dunning Wilkinson; Benita "Bonnie" Dunning Williams; Dolores Dunning Milligan; Wayne Wilentz

Skyy (also known as New York Skyy) was an American R&B/funk/disco band based in New York City. The group is perhaps best known for its 1981 hit "Call Me", as well as its 1989 comeback hits "Start of a Romance" and "Real Love".

== Career ==
Skyy was formed in Brooklyn, New York, in 1977. The original line-up consisted of sisters Denise, Delores, and Bonny Dunning as vocalists, with guitarists Solomon Roberts and Anibal Anthony Sierra, keyboardist Larry Greenberg, bassist Gerald Lebon, and drummer Tommy McConnell. In 1978, the band signed with Salsoul Records, releasing its debut album the following year.

After two albums that yielded moderate hits on the R&B charts, the group crossed over to the US pop charts with the release of the Skyy Line album in late 1981. Featured on this album was the single "Call Me," which reached number 26 on the Billboard Hot 100 charts and was its first number-one on the R&B charts. The album was later certified Gold by the RIAA. The band continued to record for the Salsoul label until the release of its 1984 Inner City album.

In the mid-1980s, the band signed with Capitol Records and released its album From the Left Side in 1986. Apart from the top ten R&B single, "Givin' It (to You)", the album saw limited success, and the group left Capitol soon thereafter.

In 1989, after signing with Atlantic Records, Skyy launched a comeback with the release of its Start of a Romance album. This release yielded two number one R&B singles, "Start of a Romance" and "Real Love". "Real Love" also became the group's second and final crossover pop hit peaking at number 47 on the Billboard Hot 100 chart in early 1990. By the release of the Nearer to You album in 1992, the hits were less successful, and the band has not released a new studio album since then.

The sisters have performed consistently since then. In 2007 they attempted to beat a Guinness World Record for the largest kazoo band at the Summerstage Concert Series in Harlem USA, singing their song “Skyyzoo.” Other notable performances have included the Salsoul Reunion Concert, where they performed with former label mates Carol Williams, Double Exposure, Instant Funk, and Joe Bataan in New York City.

== Discography ==
=== Studio albums ===
Year	Title	Peak chart positions				Certifications	Record label
Year	Title	US	US R&B	NZ	UK	Certifications	Record label
1979	Skyy	117	40	—	—		Salsoul
1980	Skyway	61	17	—	—		Salsoul
1980	Skyyport	85	16	40	—		Salsoul
1981	Skyy Line	18	1	—	—	RIAA: Gold	Salsoul
1982	Skyyjammer	81	22	—	—		Salsoul
1983	Skyylight	183	44	—	—		Salsoul
1984	Inner City	—	—	—	—		Salsoul
1986	From the Left Side	—	33	—	85		Capitol
1989	Start of a Romance	155	16	—	—		Atlantic
1992	Nearer to You	—	52	—	—		Atlantic
"—" denotes a recording that did not chart or was not released in that territory.

=== Compilation albums ===
- Skyy Flyy (1982, Salsoul)
- Greatest Hits (1996, The Right Stuff)
- The Anthology (2006, Suss'd)
- Skyyhigh: The Skyy Anthology 1979–1992 (2014, Big Break)

=== Singles ===
Year	Title	Peak chart positions						Album
Year	Title	US	US R&B	US Dan	CAN	NLD	UK	Album
1979	"First Time Around"	—	20	50	49	—	—	Skyy
1979	"Let's Turn It Out"	—	65	—	—	—	—	Skyy
1979	"This Groove Is Bad"	—	—	—	—	—	—	Skyy
1980	"High"	102	13	26	—	—	—	Skyway
1980	"Skyyzoo"	—	32	41	—	—	—	Skyway
1980	"Here's to You"	—	23	24	—	—	—	Skyyport
1981	"Superlove"	—	31	—	—	—	—	Skyyport
1981	"For the First Time"	—	—	—	—	—	—	Skyyport
1981	"Call Me"	26	1	3	—	34	—	Skyy Line
1982	"Let's Celebrate"	—	16	—	—	—	67	Skyy Line
1982	"When You Touch Me"	—	43	—	—	—	—	Skyy Line
1982	"Movin' Violation"	—	26	—	—	—	—	Skyyjammer
1983	"Let Love Shine"	—	39	41	—	—	—	Skyyjammer
1983	"Bad Boy"	—	33	—	—	—	—	Skyylight
1983	"Show Me the Way"	—	35	10	—	—	97	Skyylight
1983	"Married Man"	—	—	—	—	—	—	Skyylight
1984	"Dancin' to Be Dancin'"	—	49	—	—	—	—	Inner City
1986	"Givin' It (To You)"	—	8	42	—	—	83	From the Left Side
1986	"Non-Stop"	—	—	—	—	—	—	From the Left Side
1986	"Love Illogical"	—	—	—	—	—	—	From the Left Side
1989	"Start of a Romance"	—	1	41	—	—	—	Start of a Romance
1989	"Love All the Way"	—	47	—	—	—	—	Start of a Romance
1989	"Real Love"	47	1	—	—	—	—	Start of a Romance
1992	"Up and Over (Stronger and Better)"	—	16	—	—	—	—	Nearer to You
1992	"Nearer to You"	—	73	—	—	—	—	Nearer to You
2014	"Top of the World" (Solidisco featuring Skyy)	—	—	—	—	—	—	—
"—" denotes a recording that did not chart or was not released in that territory.
