= Doc Powell =

American jazz guitarist and composer

Doc Powell is an American jazz guitarist and composer. He was born and raised in Spring Valley, New York. He attended college at University of Charleston.

== Career ==
He has worked with Wilson Pickett, who chose him to be his musical director. He has also worked in the same capacity for Luther Vandross for over a decade. He has also worked with high-profile musicians including Stevie Wonder, Bob James, Grover Washington, Jr., Aretha Franklin, Quincy Jones and Teddy Pendergrass.

Powell's debut album, Love Is Where It's At (1987), received a Grammy nomination for Best R&B Instrumental for his cover of Marvin Gaye's "What's Going On". His credits include work on the music for the feature films The Five Heartbeats and Down and Out in Beverly Hills.

== Discography ==
=== Studio albums ===
Year	Title	Peak chart positions			Record label
Year	Title	US R&B	US Jazz	US Con. Jazz	Record label
1987	Love Is Where It's At	—	—	—	Mercury
1992	The Doctor	—	—	—	Vacuum Tube Log
1996	Laid Back	89	18	16	Discovery
1996	Inner City Blues	—	—	—	Discovery
1997	Don't Let the Smooth Jazz Fool Ya	—	14	9	Discovery
"—" denotes a recording that did not chart or was not released in that territory.
