= The Mind of Gil Scott-Heron =

1978 studio album by Gil Scott-Heron

Studio album by Gil Scott-Heron
- Released: 1978
- Recorded: 1973–78
- Genres: Soul, jazz poetry, proto-rap
- Length: 50:40
- Label: Arista
- Producer: Gil Scott-Heron

Gil Scott-Heron chronology
Bridges (1977)	The Mind of Gil Scott-Heron (1978)	1980 (1979)

Alternative cover
- 2000 reissue cover

The Mind of Gil Scott-Heron (subtitled A Collection of Poetry and Music) is a 1978 album by spoken-word and rap artist Gil Scott-Heron. Like many of Scott-Heron's albums, the album's content primarily addresses political and social issues; however, The Mind of Gil Scott-Heron relies far more on his spoken word delivery than his other albums. Whereas much of the artist's earlier albums contained backup jazz-funk music from Brian Jackson, many of these tracks, which address contemporary issues such as Watergate, the pardon of Richard Nixon and the Attica Prison riot, are either live recordings or studio-recorded songs with little more than sparse drum backing or occasional instrumentation. "Jose Campos Torres" is about Jose Campos Torres, a U.S. Army veteran who was arrested and then murdered and tossed into a bayou by two police officers in Houston in 1978, spurring the Moody Park Riot. Many of the tracks featured were included on previous Gil Scott-Heron albums.

Due to the length of some of the pieces – "The Ghetto Code (Dot Dot Dit Dit Dot Dot Dash)" is nearly 13 minutes long, and four other songs are longer than 7 minutes – the album consists of only seven songs.

One of the distinctive characteristics of Heron's poetry on this album is his use of chemical formulas to refer to certain people and events. For example, he refers to Barry Goldwater as "Barry AuH_{2}O" and Watergate as "H_{2}OGaTe".

The original vinyl release of the album contained a 24-page booklet featuring transcriptions of 22 Gil Scott-Heron compositions. The CD release also features a different cover from the original vinyl release.

== Critical reception ==
Professional ratings
Review scores
Source	Rating
AllMusic	3/5 stars
DownBeat	4/5 stars
The Rolling Stone Album Guide	3.5/5 stars

In 2011, the Chicago Tribune wrote that, "in the lineage of the Last Poets and Oscar Brown Jr., these proto-raps embody Scott-Heron's maxim that 'there are at least 500 shades of the blues.'"

DownBeat reviewer Bob Henschen wrote, "Although Gil Scott-Heron has emerged as a smooth and soulful baritone in recent years, this collection is a straight shot of his scathing wit and socio-political militancy. The commentary wielded here is biting and insightful, possibly inciteful, and the kind of street level sermon that every American should hear from time to time. During these sleepy ’70s the revolution has definitely not been televised and certain unspoken injustices continue apace".

== Track listing ==
All songs written by Gil Scott-Heron

Side A

1. "H2O Gate Blues" – 7:58 (about the Watergate break-in and cover-up) (from Winter in America)
2. "We Beg Your Pardon (Pardon Our Analysis)" – 7:52 (about the pardon of Richard Nixon) (from The First Minute of a New Day)
3. "The New Deal" – 3:10

Side B

1. "Jose Campos Torres" – 2:36
2. "The Ghetto Code (Dot Dot Dit Dit Dot Dot Dash)" – 12:57
3. "Bicentennial Blues" – 8:39 (from It's Your World)

2000 Bonus Track

7. "Space Shuttle" – 7:28

== Personnel ==
- Gil Scott-Heron – narrator

with:

- Danny Bowens – bass on "H2O Blues"; keyboards on "Space Shuttle"
- Brian Jackson – piano on "H2O Blues"
- Bob Adams – drums on "H2O Blues"
- Malcolm Cecil – bass, synthesizer on "Jose Campos Torres"
- Robbie Gordon – bass on "Space Shuttle"
- Paul Weller – keyboards on "Space Shuttle"
