= The Revolution Will Not Be Televised (album) =

1974 compilation album by Gil Scott-Heron

Compilation album by Gil Scott-Heron
- Released: 1974
- Recorded: 1970–72
- Genre: Jazz, funk, R&B, proto-rap, spoken word
- Length: 33:01
- Label: Flying Dutchman
- Producer: Bob Thiele

Gil Scott-Heron chronology
Free Will (1972)	The Revolution Will Not Be Televised (1974)	Winter in America (1974)

Alternative cover
- 1988 reissue cover

The Revolution Will Not Be Televised is a compilation album by American poet Gil Scott-Heron. It was released in 1974 by Flying Dutchman Records and titled after Scott-Heron's 1971 song of the same name.

== Recordings ==
The album features recordings previously featured on Scott-Heron's first three records for Flying Dutchman—Small Talk at 125th and Lenox (1970), Pieces of a Man (1971), and Free Will (1972), which were produced by jazz producer Bob Thiele. The music compiled incorporates funk, jazz, and proto-rap styles.

== Release and reception ==
Professional ratings
Review scores
Source	Rating
AllMusic	5/5 stars
Christgau's Record Guide	B+
The Encyclopedia of Popular Music	5/5 stars
Los Angeles Daily News	A

The Revolution Will Not Be Televised was released in 1974 and charted on Billboard's Top Jazz Albums. It peaked at number 21 on October 12 of that year after spending five weeks on the chart. In a contemporary review, Ebony magazine's Phyl Garland called the album "mind-blowing" and said Scott-Heron "does not merely posture and pacify, but presses one to consider the uncomfortable truths of contemporary blackness."

Since then, The Revolution Will Not Be Televised has received positive reviews from publications such as The Washington Post and Los Angeles Daily News, which said "the roots of rap run deep through this superb retrospective". Village Voice critic Robert Christgau said the compilation abandons the homophobia that plagued Scott-Heron's 1970 debut Small Talk at 125th and Lenox in favor of songs that show artistic progress, including agitprop that sounds less arrogant but still committed and improved singing that reveals his compassion. In To the Break of Dawn: A Freestyle on the Hip Hop Aesthetic (2007), William Jelani Cobb said of its significance in hip hop music:

While The Last Poets and This Is Madness pre-dated the beginnings of hip hop, Gil Scott-Heron's 1974 album The Revolution Will Not Be Televised was released as the art form took its first breaths of South Bronx air. Primarily a jazz album, Revolution's claim to the hip hop pantheon was anchored in a title track that found Scott-Heron delivering verse over a hypnotic, funk-indebted bassline—an approach that was so distinct at that point as to warrant classic status.

In the Encyclopedia of Popular Music (2002), writer Colin Larkin praised Scott-Heron's anger and passion in his spoken-word performances on "No Knock" and the title track. AllMusic's Alex Henderson recommended the album's "innovative R&B and spoken poetry" to listeners interested in "exploring his artistry for the first time".

== Track listing ==
Side one
No.	Title	Writer(s)	Length
1.	"The Revolution Will Not Be Televised"	Gil Scott-Heron	3:03
2.	"Sex Education: Ghetto Style"	Scott-Heron, Brian Jackson	0:48
3.	"The Get Out of the Ghetto Blues"	Scott-Heron, Jackson	4:59
4.	"No Knock"	Scott-Heron	1:27
5.	"Lady Day and John Coltrane"	Scott-Heron	3:32
6.	"Pieces of a Man"	Scott-Heron, Jackson	4:59

Side two
No.	Title	Writer(s)	Length
1.	"Home Is Where the Hatred Is"	Scott-Heron	3:18
2.	"Brother"	Scott-Heron	1:42
3.	"Save the Children"	Scott-Heron	4:22
4.	"Whitey on the Moon"	Scott-Heron	1:26
5.	"Did You Hear What They Said?"	Scott-Heron	3:25

- Sides one and two were combined as tracks 1–11 on CD reissues.

1988 CD bonus tracks
No.	Title	Writer(s)	Length
12.	"When You Are Who You Are"	Scott-Heron, Jackson	3:01
13.	"I Think I'll Call It Morning"	Scott-Heron, Jackson	3:45
14.	"A Sign of the Ages"	Scott-Heron, Jackson	4:05
15.	"Or Down You Fall"	Scott-Heron, Jackson	3:08
16.	"The Needle's Eye"	Scott-Heron, Jackson	4:01
17.	"The Prisoner"	Scott-Heron, Jackson	8:39

== Personnel ==
Musicians

- Ron Carter – bass
- Brian Jackson – piano
- Jerry Jemmott – bass
- Burt Jones – guitar
- Eddie Knowles – percussion
- Hubert Laws – alto saxophone, flute
- Pretty Purdie – drums
- Charlie Saunders – percussion
- Gil Scott-Heron – piano, vocals, songwriter
- David Spinozza – guitar

Production

- Carmine Coppola – reissue artwork
- Joe Lopes – remastering
- Bob Simpson – engineer
- Stephen Sulke – engineer
- Bob Thiele – producer, remastering

== Charts ==
Billboard Music Charts (North America) – The Revolution Will Not Be Televised

- 1974: Top Jazz Albums – No. 21 (5 weeks)

== Release history ==
Information regarding the release history of The Revolution Will Not Be Televised is adapted from Discogs.

Region	Year	Label	Format	Catalog
United States	1974	Flying Dutchman Records	vinyl LP	BDL 1-0613
Spain	1975	RCA Records	vinyl LP, Spanish edition	DBL 1-0613
Germany	1988	BMG	remastered CD	6994-2-RB
United States	1988	RCA	vinyl LP	NL 86994
United States	1988	BMG	vinyl LP	DRL 11798
Germany	1989	RCA	CD	ND86994
United States	1998	BMG	reissued LP	DRL11798

== Sampled appearances ==
The information regarding sampling of songs from The Revolution Will Not Be Televised is adapted from TheBreaks.com.

- "The Revolution Will Not Be Televised"
  - Masta Ace – "Take a Look Around"
  - Professor Griff – "Real African People 'Rap', Pt. 2"
  - Queen Latifah – "The Evil That Men Do"
  - Salt-N-Pepa – "Whatta Man Luvbug Remix 1"
- "Home Is Where the Hatred Is"
  - Kanye West ft. Common – "My Way Home"
- "Pieces of a Man"
  - KMD – "What a Niggy Know?"

== Bibliography ==
- William Jelani Cobb (2007). To the Break of Dawn: A Freestyle on the Hip Hop Aesthetic. NYU Press. ISBN 978-0-8147-1670-0.
- Colin Larkin (2002). Virgin Encyclopedia of Popular Music. Edition 4. Virgin Books. ISBN 1-85227-923-0.
