= Rivers of My Fathers =

Song by Gil Scott-Heron and Brian Jackson

from the album Winter in America
- Released: May 1974
- Recorded: October 15, 1973; at D&B Sound in Silver Spring, Maryland
- Genre: Soul, jazz
- Length: 8:29
- Label: Strata-East
- Songwriter(s): Gil Scott-Heron, Brian Jackson
- Producer(s): Perpis-Fall Music, Inc.

Audio sample
- "Rivers of My Fathers": file; help

"Rivers of My Fathers" is a song by American vocalist Gil Scott-Heron and keyboardist Brian Jackson. It was written and composed by Scott-Heron and Jackson for their first collaborative album, Winter in America (1974). The song was recorded on October 15, 1973 at D&B Sound Studio in Silver Spring, Maryland and produced by Scott-Heron and Jackson with assistance from engineer Jose Williams.

"Rivers of My Fathers" is a soul song with a jazz arrangement. Scott-Heron's Afrocentric lyrics make references to African-American cultural roots and slavery. Although it was not released as a single, the song was recognized by writers for its instrumentation and theme of cultural significance, and regarded as one of Scott-Heron's best compositions.

== Composition ==
=== Musical style ===
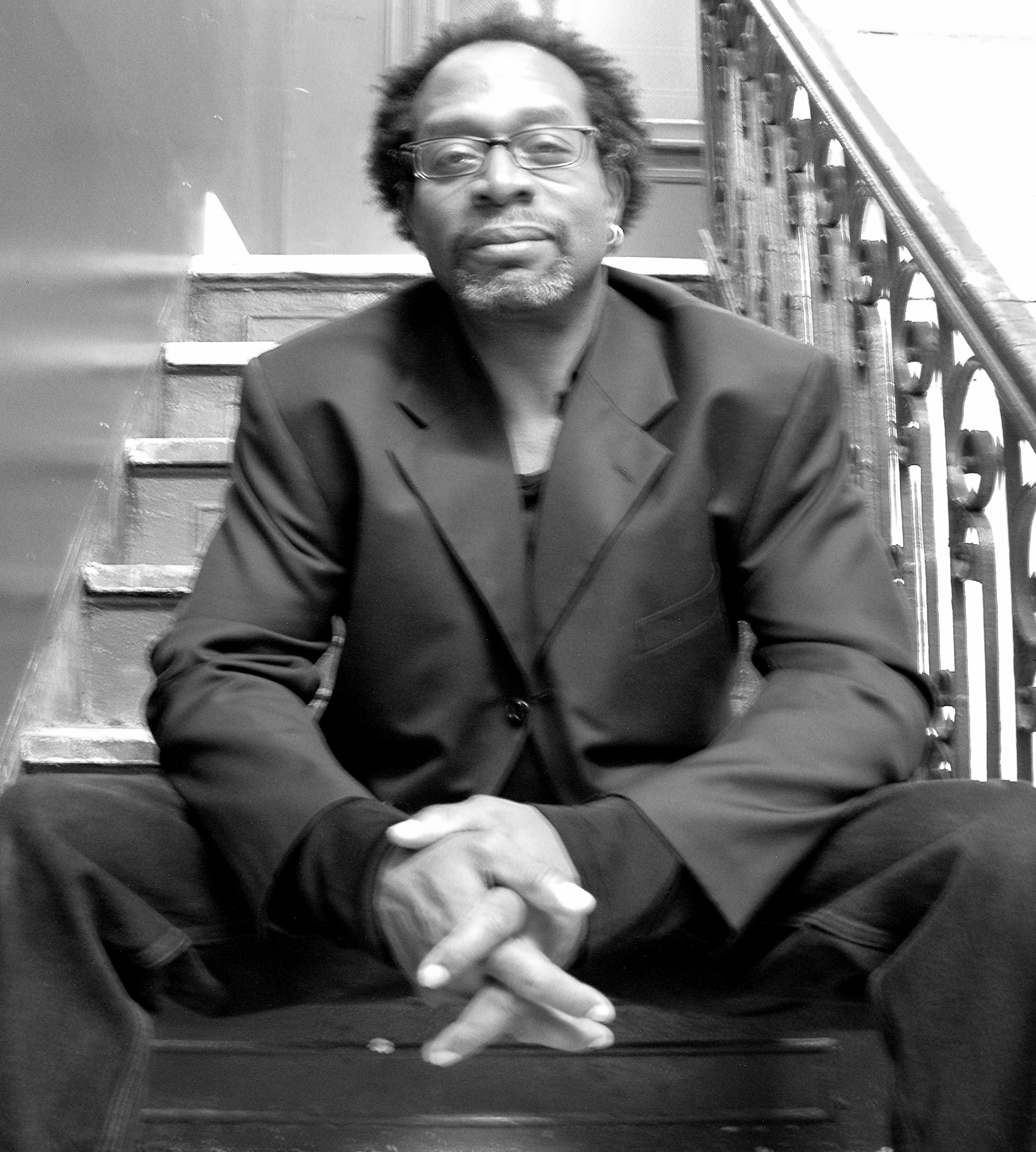
Brian Jackson co-wrote the song and played piano.

"Rivers of My Fathers" is a soul song, performed with a jazz-based arrangement spanning over eight minutes; the longest track issued on Winter in America. Recorded on October 15, 1973 at D&B Sound Studio in Silver Spring, Maryland, the session for the song, as well as Winter, featured a scaled-down lineup of Gil Scott-Heron and Brian Jackson, with drummer Bob Adams and bassist Danny Bowens, as well as a limited personnel for production. With Scott-Heron, Jackson and audio engineer Jose Williams heading production, these circumstances provided an effective forum for a reliance on strong African and R&B influences during the conception of "Rivers of My Fathers". Scott-Heron and Jackson were credited as Perpis-Fall Music, Inc. The song opens with swing-styled rim shots by Bob Adams. The opening instrumentation continues into the first two minutes, before Scott-Heron enters with vocals. Usually a spoken word performer, Scott-Heron's baritone voice accompanies and adds weight to the dark groove by vocalizing poetry, providing the lyrical subject matter to the composition.

=== Lyrical theme ===
Similar to the lyrical themes predominant on Winter in America, Scott-Heron's lyrics are Afrocentric and focus on cultural identity through the use of metaphor. Illustrating the significance of ancestry and cultural roots, "Rivers of My Fathers" features the water motif, a common metaphor in African-American culture, which evokes feelings of home and freedom, to represent faith amid the frustrations of a modern black man. As a metaphor, water was also used to hold the promise of freedom; runaway slaves used the rivers during slavery in the United States both as markers of direction and as a method of disguising their scent from hound dogs.

As the opening verse and chorus suggest, "Looking for a way out of this confusion/I'm looking for a sign, carry me home/Let me lay down by a stream and let me be miles from everything/Rivers of my fathers, could you carry me home." In his interpretation of Scott-Heron's lyrics, music writer and author Mtume ya Salaam explained "Gil sings of 'looking for a way out' out of the cold, hard city; he wants to 'lay down by a stream' that is 'miles away from everything.' But he’s too far away from home, there is no way out—instead of warm, open fields and flowing waters, there is only brick, asphalt and mortar." Following several vocal deliveries of whole choruses, the narrator pleads to the "river" to take him home, the nature of which is revealed in the closing seconds of the song as Scott-Heron intones "Africa".

== Interpretation ==
Due to its lyrical content, critics and music writers have made interpretations and comparisons of the song to Toni Morrison's 1977 novel Song of Solomon, as their themes both adhere to ancestral and cultural identity. Writer Mtume ya Salaam has also made this comparison, as he later stated in an article for the website Kalamu:

In the last passage of one of Toni Morisson’s best-known novels, a young Black man named Milkman Dead steps off of the side of a cliff and either does or does not fly ... The one thing about the book I’ve never forgotten is the final image: that of a Black man flying home ... In African-American culture, the image of a man or woman flying away to some far-off land is as common as it is archetypal. Given the way most Black Americans arrived here in the Americas, it’s easy to understand where and how the myth originated. It isn't as easy to understand it's [sic] persistence. For me, Gil Scott-Heron’s "Rivers Of My Fathers" captures the essence of 'the flying dream' better than anything else I’ve seen or heard save the dream itself. The lyrics, the melody, the arrangement—all of it gives me the same feeling I get whenever I think of Milkman standing high above everything, waiting for weightlessness to spirit him away.

— Mtume ya Salaam

In addition to its recognition for the literary allusion to Songs of Solomon, "Rivers of My Fathers" has been recognized by critics and music writers as one of Winter in America's best recordings, as well as one of Gil Scott-Heron's best compositions.

== Personnel ==
Credits adapted from album liner notes.

- Gil Scott-Heron – vocals, producer
- Brian Jackson – piano
- Danny Bowens – fender bass
- Bob Adams – drums (traps)
- Jose Williams – engineer, production assistance

== Bibliography ==
- Eric Weisbard, Craig Marks (2003). Spin Alternative Record Guide. 1st edi. (Ratings 1-10). Vintage Books, New York, NY. ISBN 0-679-75574-8.
- Gil Scott-Heron, Brian Jackson (1998). Winter in America (Rumal-Gia) CD reissue booklet. liner notes. Ruma-Gia Ltd./TVT Records, 23 E. 4th Street, New York, NY 10003.
