= Nothing New (album) =

Studio album by Gil Scott-Heron
- Released: April 19, 2014
- Recorded: 2005–2009
- Genre: Acoustic
- Length: 32:14
- Label: XL Recordings
- Producers: Gil Scott-Heron; Richard Russell

Gil Scott-Heron chronology
We're New Here (2011)	Nothing New (2014)

Professional ratings
Review scores
Source	Rating
The Irish Times	3/5 stars

Nothing New is a posthumous album of vocal & piano recordings by Gil Scott-Heron released by XL Recordings on April 19, 2014, in conjunction with Record Store Day. The album consists of new, stripped-down versions of a selection of older Scott-Heron songs stretching from 1971's "Pieces of a Man" to 1994's "The Other Side". It was recorded with producer Richard Russell between 2005 and 2009, in the same sessions that led to 2010's I'm New Here.

In the liner notes published on the official website, Russell describes the album as, "carefully curated (and) an excellent introduction to his previous output," adding that, "the album is utterly sparse and devoid of anything that is not completely necessary. All it contains is Gil's singing and piano playing."

On April 1, 2015, the album was released digitally alongside a documentary named Who Is Gil Scott-Heron?.

== Track listing ==
All lyrics are written by Gil Scott-Heron; all music is composed by Gil Scott-Heron, except for "Pieces of a Man"; co-composed by Brian Jackson.

No.	Title	Original album	Length
1.	"Did You Hear What They Said?"	Free Will	4:02
2.	"Better Days Ahead"	Secrets	4:40
3.	"Household Name" (Interlude)		0:12
4.	"Your Daddy Loves You"	Winter in America	4:06
5.	"Changing Yourself" (Interlude)		0:10
6.	"Pieces of a Man"	Pieces of a Man	4:36
7.	"Enjoying Yourself" (Interlude)		0:13
8.	"Alien (Hold On To Your Dreams)"	1980	3:01
9.	"Before I Hit the Bottom" (Interlude)		0:20
10.	"95 South (All of the Places We've Been)"	Bridges	3:12
11.	"The Other Side"	Spirits	3:04
12.	"The On/Off Switch" (Interlude)		0:26
13.	"Blue Collar"	Moving Target	3:54
14.	"On Bobby Blue Bland" (Outro)		0:17
Total length:			32:14

== Charts ==
Chart	Peak position
US Top Jazz Albums (Billboard)	3
US Top Contemporary Jazz Albums (Billboard)	1
