= Johannesburg (song) =

Song by Gil Scott-Heron and Brian Jackson

from the album From South Africa to South Carolina
- Released: November 1975
- Recorded: Summer 1975
- Studio: D&B Sound (Silver Spring, Maryland)
- Genre: Disco; funk; jazz-funk
- Length: 4:52
- Label: Arista
- Lyricist(s): Gil Scott-Heron
- Producer(s): The Midnight Band

Official audio
- "Johannesburg" (live) on YouTube

"Johannesburg" is a song by Gil Scott-Heron and Brian Jackson, with music provided by the Midnight Band. It is the first track on Scott-Heron and Jackson's collaborative album From South Africa to South Carolina, released in November 1975 through Arista Records. The lyrics to "Johannesburg" discussed opposition to apartheid in South Africa, and likened apartheid to the disenfranchisement of African Americans in the United States. The song became a popular hit, reaching No. 29 on the Billboard R&B chart in 1975. According to Nelson George, "Johannesburg" played a role in spreading the cultural awareness of apartheid.

== Background, lyrics, and composition ==
Gil Scott-Heron and Brian Jackson met and began collaborating while they were both students at Lincoln University in Oxford, Pennsylvania. The duo formed the Midnight Band, which Jackson led as a keyboardist. Several members of the Midnight Band had previously played with the Black & Blues, a musical group Scott-Heron and Jackson had formed as students. The Midnight Band played the music on Scott-Heron's 1975 albums The First Minute of a New Day and From South Africa to South Carolina, and was important to their success.

From South Africa to South Carolina explored contentious political issues: "Johannesburg" examined the apartheid system in South Africa. At the time, South Africa was witnessing a struggle between the African National Congress, which sought to dismantle apartheid, and the government of the National Party, which sought to maintain it. Black South Africans were being denied the right to vote, to assemble, and to form trade unions. The lyrics of "Johannesburg" do not criticize apartheid directly, but pose questions, asking whether the listener has heard the news from Johannesburg, and suggesting that black South Africans were rising up. In doing so Scott-Heron makes frequent use of phrases from black vernacular. Musically, the song has been associated with disco, funk protest, and jazz-funk.

The song frequently refers to the scarcity and unreliability of information in the West about opposition to apartheid within South Africa, and calls for a continued awareness of events in South Africa. The refrain "What's the word? Johannesburg!" represents a musical crescendo within the song, during which Scott-Heron engages in a call and response with band members. The refrain parodies a jingle for Thunderbird wine, a cheap wine sold by Gallo: "What's the word? Thunderbird!". Scott-Heron's lyrics expressed his Pan-African and transnational leanings, likening apartheid to the disenfranchisement of African Americans in the United States. The song ends by comparing Johannesburg to a number of cities in the US, thereby noting the "absence of an achieved freedom on American soil", according to scholar Stéphane Robolin.

== Release, reception, and legacy ==
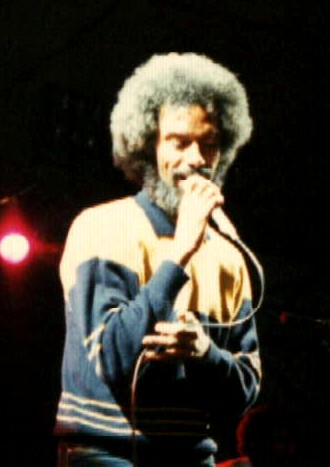
Scott-Heron performing at WOMAD in Bristol, 1986

Scott-Heron initially resisted pressure to release "Johannesburg" as a single, preferring to release complete albums; however, he was persuaded to release the track as a twelve-inch single by Arista Records. In November 1975, the song was released again as the first track on From South Africa to South Carolina. In December 1975 Scott-Heron performed "Johannesburg" on Saturday Night Live. The album was reissued in 1998 via Scott-Heron's Rumal-Gia label, distributed by TVT Records. The reissue included a 1982 live recording of "Johannesburg", on which Scott-Heron induced the audience to playing the part of the chorus on the call and response refrain. Scott-Heron frequently played the song live, including in Johannesburg in 1998, when he and Jackson visited South Africa for the first time: there, they found the song was not well-known, as it had been banned during apartheid.

Unusually for a song with a political message, "Johannesburg" became a popular hit, receiving playtime on the radio and reaching No. 29 on the Billboard R&B chart in 1975. It became one of Scott-Heron's most popular political songs. According to Scott-Heron's biographer Marcus Baram, "Johannesburg" was "arguably the first pop song to address apartheid". It had a particular impact among black Americans and activists. The culture critic Nelson George stated in 2011 that "Johannesburg" played a large role in spreading the cultural awareness of apartheid for him and other young people.

== Sources ==
- Baram, M. (2014). Gil Scott-Heron: Pieces of a Man. St. Martin's Publishing Group. ISBN 978-1-250-01278-4.
- Bolden, T. (2020). Groove Theory: The Blues Foundation of Funk. American Made Music Series. University Press of Mississippi. ISBN 978-1-4968-3063-0.
- Cosgrove, Stuart (2018). Harlem 69: The Future of Soul. The Soul Trilogy. Birlinn. ISBN 978-1-78885-025-4.
- Pollock, Bruce (2014). Rock Song Index: The 7500 Most Important Songs for the Rock and Roll Era. Taylor & Francis. ISBN 978-1-135-46296-3.
- Robolin, Stéphane (2015). Grounds of Engagement: Apartheid-Era African-American and South African Writing. New Black Studies Series. University of Illinois Press. ISBN 978-0-252-09758-4.
