= Studio 150 =

Studio album by Paul Weller
- Released: 14 September 2004
- Studios: Studio 150, Amsterdam; Black Barn Studios, Woking, Surrey
- Genres: Rock, soul
- Length: 45:51
- Label: V2 Records
- Producers: Paul Weller; Jan Kybert

Paul Weller chronology
Fly on the Wall: B Sides & Rarities (2003)	Studio 150 (2004)	As Is Now (2005)

Professional ratings
Aggregate scores
Source	Rating
Metacritic	48/100
Review scores
Source	Rating
AllMusic	3/5 stars
Dotmusic	7/10
Mojo	4/5 stars
NME	2/10
The Observer	3/5 stars
Q	2/5 stars
The Scotsman	3/5 stars
Under the Radar	7/10

Studio 150 is the seventh solo studio album by English singer-songwriter Paul Weller. It comprises covers of songs by a variety of artists, and showcases Weller's myriad musical influences. It was named after the small Amsterdam studio in which it was recorded. Released in September 2004, it entered the UK Albums Chart at No. 2, its overall peak position.

== Track listing ==
1. "If I Could Only Be Sure" (Gabriel Mekler, Nolan Porter)
2. "Wishing on a Star" (Billie Rae Calvin)
3. "Don't Make Promises" (Tim Hardin)
4. "The Bottle" (Gil Scott-Heron)
5. "Black Is the Colour" (Traditional)
6. "Close to You" (Burt Bacharach, Hal David)
7. "Early Morning Rain" (Gordon Lightfoot)
8. "One Way Road" (Noel Gallagher)
9. "Hercules" (Allen Toussaint)
10. "Thinking of You" (Bernard Edwards, Nile Rodgers)
11. "All Along the Watchtower" (Bob Dylan)
12. "Birds" (Neil Young)

=== Original versions ===
1. "If I Could Only Be Sure", a Northern soul song from 1972 by Nolan Porter
2. "Wishing on a Star", originally a 1977 song from Rose Royce that became a hit single in 1978
3. "Don't Make Promises", from Tim Hardin's 1966 debut album
4. "The Bottle", from Scott-Heron's 1974 album Winter in America
5. "Black Is the Color (of My True Love's Hair)", Appalachian folk song with Scottish origins, popularised by Pete Seeger, Nina Simone and Joan Baez around 1960
6. "Close to You", originally sung by Richard Chamberlain in 1963, popularised by The Carpenters in 1970
7. "Early Morning Rain", by Gordon Lightfoot from his 1966 debut album Lightfoot!
8. "One Way Road", originally appeared as a B-side on Oasis' 2000 single "Who Feels Love?"
9. "Hercules", recorded in 1973 by Aaron Neville for a single release
10. "Thinking of You", originally by Sister Sledge from 1979, became a UK hit in 1984
11. "All Along the Watchtower", originally recorded for Dylan's 1967 album John Wesley Harding
12. "Birds", originally from Neil Young's 1970 album After the Gold Rush

== Personnel ==
- Paul Weller – vocals, guitar, keyboards
- Steve Cradock – acoustic and electric guitar (tracks 1, 7, 12)
- Damon Minchella – bass guitar (except 3, 7, 10, 12)
- Steve "Supe" White – drums, percussion (except 7, 12)
- Petra Rosa – harp (2, 6)
- Danny Thompson – double bass (3, 10)
- Dalbir Singh Rattan – tabla (4, 10)
- Eliza Carthy – solo violin (5, 7)
- Bill Newsinger – mandolin (5)
- Stefan Schmid – Moog and Korg synthesizer (5)
- David Kweksilber – clarinet (8)
- The Stands – background vocals (8)
- Carleen Anderson, Sam Leigh Brown, Claudia Fontaine – background vocals (11, 12)
- Horn section (1, 3, 4, 6, 8, 9), arranged by Benjamin Herman and Willem Friede

- Benjamin Herman – alto, tenor and baritone saxophone, flute
- Ray Bruinsma, Jan van Duikeren – trumpet, flugelhorn
- Joeri de Vente – French horn
- Louk Boudesteijn – trombone
- Frans Cornelissen – tuba

- String section (2, 10), arranged by Willem Friede

- Martin de Ruiter, Sarah Koch, Seija Teeuwen, Pauline Terlow, Lorre Trytten, Herman van Haaren – violin
- Mieke Honingh, Aimée Versloot – viola
- Bastiaan van der Werf – cello

=== Production ===
- Recorded and mixed by Joeri Saal at Studio 150 in Amsterdam, Netherlands
- Additional recording for tracks 5, 11 and 12 by Charles Rees at Black Barn Studios, England
- Mastered by Kevin Metcalfe at Sound Masters
- Produced by Jan "Stan" Kybert, Paul Weller
- Co-Producer – Steve "Supe" White (1, 3, 4, 9–11)

== Charts ==
=== Weekly charts ===
Chart (2004)	Peak position
Australian Albums (ARIA)	192
Belgian Albums (Ultratop Flanders)	53
Dutch Albums (Album Top 100)	36
French Albums (SNEP)	155
German Albums (Offizielle Top 100)	35
Irish Albums (IRMA)	5
Italian Albums (FIMI)	29
Scottish Albums (Official Charts)	2
UK Albums (Official Charts)	2

=== Year-end charts ===
Chart (2004)	Position
UK Albums (OCC)	95

== Singles ==
The singles, with B-sides, from Studio 150 were:

- "The Bottle" (2004) - No. 13 UK
  - "Corrina Corrina" (Bo Carter, Mitchell Parish, J. Mayo Williams)
  - "Coconut Grove" (John Sebastian, Zal Yanovsky), originally by The Lovin' Spoonful
- "Wishing on a Star" (2004) - No. 11 UK
  - "Family Affair" (Sly Stone)
  - "Let It Be Me" (Gilbert Bécaud, Pierre Delanoë, Manny Curtis)
- "Thinking of You" (2004) - No. 18 UK
  - "Don't Go to Strangers" (Arthur Kent, Dave Mann, Redd Evans), originally sung by Etta Jones
  - "Needles and Pins" (Jack Nitzsche, Sonny Bono), originally sung by Jackie DeShannon and then The Searchers
- "Early Morning Rain" (2004) - No. 40 UK
  - "Come Together" (Lennon–McCartney)

== DVD ==
Besides the Studio 150 album, there was also a DVD release featuring a studio concert Weller gave at the Riverside Studios in London in 2004. The DVD features most songs from the album and some songs Weller wrote during his career, including a song of The Jam and The Style Council.

It also includes interviews and the video promo for "Wishing on a Star".
