= It's Your World =

It's Your World may refer to:

- It's Your World (album), a 1976 album by Gil Scott-Heron
- "It's Your World" (song), a 2014 song by Jennifer Hudson
