= The Best of Gil Scott-Heron =

Greatest hits album by Gil Scott-Heron
- Released: 1984
- Genre: Spoken word, soul, jazz-funk
- Label: Arista

Gil Scott-Heron chronology
Moving Target (1982)	The Best of Gil Scott-Heron (1984)	The Revolution Will Not Be Televised (1998)

Professional ratings
Review scores
Source	Rating
Allmusic	4/5 stars
The Village Voice	A− link

The Best of Gil Scott-Heron is a 1984 compilation album by American recording artist Gil Scott-Heron, released on the Arista label.

== Track listing ==
All songs written by Gil Scott-Heron.

=== Side One ===
1. "The Revolution Will Not Be Televised" (1974)
2. "The Bottle" (1976)
3. "Winter in America" (1975)
4. "Johannesburg" (1975)
5. "Ain't No Such Thing as Superman" (1974)

=== Side Two ===
1. "Re-Ron" (1984)
2. "Shut 'Em Down" (1979)
3. "Angel Dust" (1978)
4. "B Movie" (1981)
