= Nothing New =

Nothing New may refer to:

- Nothing New (album), a 2014 album by Gil Scott-Heron
- Nothing New, a 2011 EP by Tadpole
- "Nothing New" (song), a 2021 song by Taylor Swift featuring Phoebe Bridgers
- "Nothing New", a song by Ashlee Simpson from the album Autobiography, 2004
- "Nothin' New", a song by Gloria Estefan from the album Cuts Both Ways, 1989
- "Nothin' New", a song by Ab-Soul
- "Nothin' New", a song by 21 Savage from the album Issa Album, 2017
