= The Bottle =

1974 single by Gil Scott-Heron and Brian Jackson

Single by Gil Scott-Heron and Brian Jackson

from the album Winter in America
- B-side: "The Bottle (Drunken mix)"
- Released: 1974
- Recorded: October 15, 1973; D&B Sound (Silver Spring, Maryland)
- Genre: Jazz-funk
- Length: 5:14
- Label: Strata-East
- Songwriter: Gil Scott-Heron
- Producer: Perpis-Fall Music

Gil Scott-Heron singles chronology
"The Revolution Will Not Be Televised" (1971)	"The Bottle" (1974)	"Johannesburg" (1975)

Official audio
- "The Bottle" on YouTube

"The Bottle" is a song by American soul artist Gil Scott-Heron and musician Brian Jackson, released in 1974 on Strata-East Records in the United States. It was later reissued during the mid-1980s on Champagne Records in the United Kingdom. "The Bottle" was written by Scott-Heron and produced by audio engineer Jose Williams, Jackson, and Scott-Heron. The song serves as a social commentary on alcohol abuse, and it features a Caribbean beat and notable flute solo by Jackson, with Scott-Heron playing keyboards.

The song was issued as the first and only single for Scott-Heron's and Jackson's album Winter in America (1974). It became an underground and cult hit upon its release, and the single peaked at number 15 on the R&B Singles Chart. Described by music critics as the album's best recording, the commercial success of "The Bottle" helped lead to Jackson's and Scott-Heron's next recording contract with Arista Records. Similar to other compositions by Scott-Heron, the song has been sampled extensively by hip hop artists.

The song describes the lives of the alcoholics living in the Logan Circle neighborhood of Washington, D.C.

== Composition ==
"The Bottle"
Cited by critics as its album's best recording, the song is a rhythmic social commentary on alcohol abuse.

"The Bottle" is a social commentary on alcohol abuse with a Caribbean beat. Scott-Heron wrote it after seeing men line up every day in front of a liquor store called the Log Cabin in Washington, D.C., bringing back their empty bottles to get a discount on their next purchase. Scott-Heron said of his inspiration for the song in an interview for Newsnight, "I discovered one of them was an ex-physician, who'd been busted for abortions on young girls. There was an air traffic controller in the military - one day he sent two jets crashing into a mountain. He left work that day and never went back."

The song also became a popular song played at parties at the time. French music critic Pierre Jean-Critin later described it as "an epic song ... whose infectious groove can still set dance floors alight over thirty years later." The song's pop/dance sensibilities and social message engendered its appeal to listeners following its release as a single. Scott-Heron later said of the single's success and style, "Pop music doesn't necessarily have to be shit."

Cited by critics and music writers as Winter in America's best track, "The Bottle" also addresses problems of drug addiction, abortion, and incarceration, while featuring Jackson on flute and Scott-Heron on keyboards. While its theme examines the plight of alcoholics and those who have to live with and cope with them, "The Bottle" became a concert favorite and one of Scott-Heron's most popular songs.

== Release and reception ==
"The Bottle" was released in 1974 as the only single for Winter in America. The song became an underground and cult hit upon its release. Scott-Heron and Jackson's version peaked at number 98 on the Billboard Hot Soul Singles on the week ending February 18, 1977. The single's success helped lead to Jackson's and Scott-Heron's next recording contract with Arista Records, where they would enjoy more commercial success.

"The Bottle" has been cited by critics as Winter in America's best song. Paul J. MacArthur of the Houston Press called it a "strong anti-alcohol rant with a funky bass hook and chilly flute fills." "The Bottle" was later ranked number 92 on NME's list of The Top 150 Singles of All-Time and was included in Q magazine's 1010 Songs You Must Own! publication.

== Track listings and formats ==
These are the formats and track listings of the U.K. single releases of "The Bottle":

=== 7" Single ===
A-side

1. "The Bottle" (Album version)

B-side

1. "The Bottle" (Sober mix)

=== 12" Single ===
A-side

1. "The Bottle" (Drunken mix)

B-side

1. "The Bottle" (Short version)
2. "The Bottle" (Sober mix)

== Personnel ==
- Gil Scott-Heron – lead vocals, electric piano
- Brian Jackson – flute
- Danny Bowens – bass
- Bob Adams – drums
- Perpis-Fall Music, Inc. – producer
- Jose Williams – engineer, production assistance

== Charts ==
Chart (1977)	Peak position
US Hot R&B/Hip-Hop Songs (Billboard)	97

== Cover versions ==
Later in 1974, shortly after the release of the original Gil Scott-Heron/Brian Jackson recording, funk/soul group Brother to Brother released their own rendition of "The Bottle" with a similar orchestration as the original but slightly more straightforward and uptempo. The Brother to Brother version peaked at number nine on the Billboard Hot Soul (R&B) Singles chart in the week ending October 5, 1974, and number 46 on the Billboard Hot 100 in the week ending November 16, 1974. To this day, it remains the band's signature tune and their biggest hit song to date.

Joe Bataan covered "The Bottle" as an instrumental for his 1975 album Afrofilipino, though slightly re-titled "The Bottle (La Botella)". It was released as a single and peaked at number 59 on the Billboard Hot Soul (R&B) Singles chart in the week ending April 5, 1975. It became one of his most notable recordings from the album.

C.O.D. released a hit electro version in 1983.

The Christians covered "The Bottle" for their 1992 album Happy in Hell which reached No. 39 in the UK in 1993.

Paul Weller covered "The Bottle" for his 2004 album Studio 150.

British funk band Jamiroquai performed the song during their 1993 Emergency on Planet Earth Tour.
