= Nolan Porter =

American singer (1949–2021)

- Also known as: Nolan, Frederick II, N. F. Porter
- Born: Nolan Frederick Porter; May 10, 1949; Los Angeles, California, U.S.
- Died: February 4, 2021 (aged 71)
- Genres: Soul, rock
- Occupations: Singer, songwriter
- Years active: 1968–2021
- Labels: Lizard, Vulture, ABC-Dunhill, Probe

Nolan Frederick Porter (May 10, 1949 – February 4, 2021) was an American R&B singer and songwriter who recorded two albums and six singles in the early 1970s. His best known song is "Keep On Keeping On", which became popular on the northern soul scene. In 1978 the band Joy Division used the guitar riff from Porter's song for their song "Interzone" on their debut album Unknown Pleasures. (Note: Bernie Binnick, former record owner and impresario for RCA wanted a punk band to record a version of Porter's "Keep On Keeping On".)

== Biography ==
Based in Los Angeles, Porter's first recorded song (as Nolan) was a version of Van Morrison's "Crazy Love" released on the Lizard label in 1971. Two other 45s were released on Lizard, including "Keep On Keeping On" before he switched to the larger imprint ABC for two final 45 releases. The first of these, "If I Could Only Be Sure" would become a popular song in UK northern soul dance halls. It was covered by Paul Weller and released on his Studio 150 album in 2004. Porter also recorded "Groovin' (Out On Life)" as Frederick II on Gabriel Mekler's Vulture label and earned a small R&B hit. Porter was also married to Frank Zappa's sister Candy.

Porter died at his home in Van Nuys, Los Angeles, on February 4, 2021, at age 71.

== Album releases ==
Porter released two albums. The first, No Apologies, appeared in 1970 on Mekler's Lizard imprint and features songs by Steve Cropper, Booker T Jones and Randy Newman as well as Porter originals. The musicians for much of the album consisted of former members of Frank Zappa's Mothers of Invention. Lowell George contributes guitar parts. Reviewing in Christgau's Record Guide: Rock Albums of the Seventies (1981), Robert Christgau said: "A black singer whose idiom is rock-influenced soul (or vice versa) turns Randy Newman's 'Let's Burn Down the Cornfield' into a song about smoldering sharecropper unrest (well, sort of) and finds good ones by David Blue (well, sort of) and Booker T. Plus writing wise, witty, rocking songs of his own, songs that belong in this company, many of them about racial identity. Formally, this is the Rod Stewart strategy, and the artistic achievement is comparable. But does he have Stewart's backing on the radio or in the express? Well, no."

In August 1972, Porter returned to the studio to record his second and last album, Nolan. The album contained four new songs and re-recorded mixes of older songs such as "Groovin (Out On Life)" and "If I Could Only Be Sure". The album and an accompanying single "Singer Man" resulted in few takers. Mekler's labels collapsed towards the end of 1973 and Porter's short recording career came to an end. Material he recorded later in the decade was not released.

Porter continued working in Los Angeles nightclubs as a musician and comedian. He also performed in clubs in his home country and overseas in Spain and United Kingdom.

Posthumously the British retro soul band Stone Foundation released a live album recorded at the famed 100 Club in London. Stone Foundation backs Porter from a show in 2012.
