= From South Africa to South Carolina =

Studio album by Gil Scott-Heron and Brian Jackson
- Released: November 1975
- Recorded: June–July 1975
- Studios: D&B, Silver Spring, Maryland
- Label: Arista
- Producers: Perpis-Fall Music, Inc., Jose Williams, Midnight Band

Gil Scott-Heron and Brian Jackson chronology
| The First Minute of a New Day (1975) | From South Africa to South Carolina (1975) | It's Your World (1976) |

From South Africa to South Carolina is a studio album by the American vocalist Gil Scott-Heron and the keyboardist Brian Jackson. It was released in November 1975 by Arista Records. Scott-Heron performed "Johannesburg" and "A Lovely Day" on Saturday Night Live in December 1975. The album was reissued in the late 1990s via Scott-Heron's Rumal-Gia label, distributed by TVT Records.

The album peaked at No. 103 on the Billboard 200. "Johannesburg" was a moderate "disco" hit.

== Production ==
The music was provided by the Midnight Band, led by Jackson.

== Critical reception ==
Professional ratings
Review scores
| Source | Rating |
|---|---|
| AllMusic | 4/5 stars |
| Christgau's Record Guide | B+ |
| The Commercial Appeal | 3.5/4 stars |
| The Encyclopedia of Popular Music | 4/5 stars |
| The Rolling Stone Album Guide | 3.5/5 stars |

The Houston Press, reviewing a reissue, wrote that the album's "best moments are the beautiful lament 'Beginnings', which is rife with bittersweet harmonies, and 'A Lovely Day', a light, poppish, medium-tempo number that builds to a smart climax." The Chicago Tribune thought that it was one of a handful of albums that "brought a new depth and political consciousness to the urban vision of the '70s." The Wire praised "Essex", calling the song "probably the most out thing this team ever tried: freeform intro, mordantly twining vocals, Jackson's darting, flickering flute."

== Track listing ==
Side one

1. "Johannesburg" 4:52
2. "A Toast to the People" 5:47
3. "The Summer of '42" 4:42
4. "Beginnings (The First Minute of a New Day)" 6:23

Side two

1. "South Carolina (Barnwell)" 3:45
2. "Essex" 9:17
3. "Fell Together" 4:30
4. "A Lovely Day" 3:29

Bonus tracks

CD reissue bonus tracks

1. "South Carolina (Barnwell)" (Live from the No Nukes concert at Madison Square Garden) 6:29
2. "Save the Children" (Live from Blues Alley, Washington DC) 4:23
3. "Johannesburg" (Live from Gil Scott-Heron: Black Wax) 11:14
4. "Let Me See Your I.D." (from Sun City: Artists Against Apartheid) 7:30

== Personnel ==
- Gil Scott-Heron – vocals, electric piano
- Brian Jackson – vocals, flute, keyboards, synthesizer
- Victor Brown – vocals, tambourine, bells
- Bilal Sunni Ali – saxophone, flute, harmonica
- Danny Bowens – bass
- Bob Adams – drums
- Charlie Saunders – congas, Chinese drum
- Barnett Williams – congas, djembe drums, shekere
- Adenola – congas

"Let Me See Your I.D." performed by Big Youth, Ray Barretto, Brian Jackson, Duke Bootee, Peter Garrett, Grandmaster Melle Mel, and Gil Scott-Heron
