= Winter in America =

1974 studio album by Gil Scott-Heron and Brian Jackson

Studio album by Gil Scott-Heron and Brian Jackson
- Released: May 1974
- Recorded: September 4–5, 1973; October 15, 1973
- Studios: D&B Sound (Silver Spring, Maryland)
- Genres: Soul; blues; jazz fusion; soul jazz; progressive soul
- Length: 44:27
- Label: Strata-East
- Producers: Gil Scott-Heron; Brian Jackson

Gil Scott-Heron chronology
The Revolution Will Not Be Televised (1974)	Winter in America (1974)	The First Minute of a New Day (1975)

Singles from Winter in America
- 1. "The Bottle" Released: 1974

Winter in America is a studio album by American vocalist Gil Scott-Heron and keyboardist Brian Jackson. It was recorded in September to October 1973 at D&B Sound Studio in Silver Spring, Maryland, and released in May 1974 by Strata-East Records. Scott-Heron and Jackson produced the album in a stripped-down fashion, relying on traditional African and R&B sounds, while Jackson's piano-based arrangements were rooted in jazz and the blues. The subject matter on Winter in America deals with the African-American community and inner city in the 1970s.

The album serves as Scott-Heron and Jackson's debut release for Strata-East, following a dispute with their former label and departure. It proved to be their sole release for the independent jazz label. Upon its release, Winter in America featured limited distribution in the United States and quickly became rare in print. However, with promotional help from its only single "The Bottle", it obtained considerably larger commercial success than Scott-Heron's and Jackson's previous work. The album debuted at number six on Billboard's Top Jazz Albums chart and eventually sold over 300,000 copies in the United States.

While it was critically overlooked upon its release, Winter in America earned retrospective acclaim from several writers and music critics as Scott-Heron's and Jackson's greatest work together. Along with its critical recognition, it has been noted by several critics for its influence on derivative music forms such as neo soul and hip hop music, as many artists of the genres have been influenced by Scott-Heron's and Jackson's lyrical and musical approach on the album. On March 10, 1998, Winter in America was reissued on compact disc for the first time in the United States through Scott-Heron's Rumal-Gia Records.

== Background ==
After leaving his former label Flying Dutchman Records, Gil Scott-Heron signed with the New York City jazz-based Strata-East label in early 1973, accompanied by jazz keyboardist and songwriter Brian Jackson, with whom he had worked on his previous studio albums, Pieces of a Man (1971) and Free Will (1972). While some sources allege this may have been over financial or creative differences, Scott-Heron maintained the switch was due to producer Bob Thiele's unwillingness to give Jackson co-billing. By the time of their move to Strata-East, Scott-Heron and Jackson had achieved underground notice among R&B and soul music listeners, particularly for the political and social nature of their music's themes, as well as Scott-Heron's emphasis on African-American culture and social plight in his compositions. Their musical fusion of jazz, blues, soul and spoken word styles helped them earn some notice among less-mainstream black music listeners at the time.

Social circumstances and musical events preceded Scott-Heron's and Jackson's signing with Strata-East. After the decline of popularity in traditional jazz forms during the Civil Rights Movement and Black Power movement, black pride and Afrocentric sentiment by many black Americans emerged. During 1970 to 1974, the Black Panther Party organization had been neutralized and pan-Africanism came into vogue. Following the free jazz and avant-garde breakthroughs of Ornette Coleman and John Coltrane, a creative stasis among most jazz musicians set in during the decade that led to an eclecticism where no style or conception of jazz maintained a zeitgeist among players. However, jazz fusion had gained mainstream notice for its stylistic adoption of rock and funk music, despite being the subject of controversy in jazz purist circles. Highlighted by the works of Roy Ayers, Herbie Hancock, and Donald Byrd, jazz-funk also emerged in response to the growing popularity of funk, leading to a trend of funk rhythms among jazz musicians formerly of the hard bop tradition as an attempt to reconnect with their African-American audience. This factored into the popularity of Scott-Heron's and Jackson's work in the black underground scene, with the former obtaining a reputation as a "street poet", while his work with Jackson served as an early recording of jazz poetry.

Scott-Heron had looked to expand on his socially conscious, pro black-oriented themes and independently produce a more conceptual album than his previous work had envisioned. Scott-Heron's and Jackson's search for more creative control over their recordings prompted them to sign with Strata-East Records. Established in 1971 by jazz musicians Charles Tolliver and Stanley Cowell, in response to major record companies' lack of interest in their recordings, the Strata-East label had become known for signing artists who recorded with diverse styles of jazz music with themes of social consciousness and black nationalism, as well as "minimal but eye-grabbing graphic design" for its releases.

The label had also been known for carrying out the management concept of "condominium". Originally conceived and penned by Cowell, it gave artists authority and responsibility over their recorded material independently, as well as the ability to assign the master tapes over to the label for distribution. Strata-East artists had more control over their recordings than major labels at the time had offered. Music journalist Kevin Moist later wrote of the label's "condominium" concept, "The idea was to try and develop an independent cultural space outside of the mainstream that could function self-sufficiently and be genuinely participatory for its members. The goal was to live in an engaged way where art, society, spirituality, and politics could all come together holistically in an integrated existence. That (sub)cultural renewal is embodied in the kind of music midwifed by Strata-East." The label's philosophy for artist management and recording ethic worked to the advantage of artists such as Gil Scott-Heron and Brian Jackson. Scott-Heron and Jackson were able to release more aesthetically personalized recordings for Strata-East than most mainstream labels would allow.

== Recording and production ==
To record the album, Jackson suggested a small studio located outside of Washington, D.C., in Silver Spring, Maryland. The sessions took place in September and October 1973 at Silver Spring's D&B Sound Studios. According to Scott-Heron, the studio's main room was so small that when the two musicians recorded, Jackson was forced out next to the cooler, playing flute in the studio's hallway while Scott-Heron sang in the main room. However, Scott-Heron felt comfortable in the small studio. Jose Williams was enlisted as the recording engineer for the album. Williams assisted Scott-Heron and Jackson, who were credited for production under the title Perpis-Fall Music, Inc., with production, and he engineered the album's recordings entirely himself.

The recording sessions served as the first production credit for Scott-Heron, Jackson, and Jose Williams. As the third unofficial collaboration between Scott-Heron and Jackson, the album's recording featured more of Jackson's input than before. Jackson recounted the experience in an interview for All About Jazz, stating: "He had this way with words and I thought to myself, 'People have to hear this stuff'. What I had to offer was the music and I figured if we can take his words and make this tribal knowledge rhythmic and musical, we can draw people to hear it."

In contrast to their Flying Dutchman recordings and subsequent Arista recordings, Winter in America utilized a sparse production quality and small number of sessions musicians. A small supporting line-up, featuring drummer Bob Adams and bassist Danny Bowens, contributed on a few cuts. Adams and Bowens, who studied with Scott-Heron at Lincoln University, arrived from the Pennsylvania-based college on the last day of recording on October 15, 1973. Scott-Heron and Jackson handled most of the vocals, songwriting, and instrumentation, and they were assisted by Williams with the production.

The September 4 and 5 sessions featured only Jackson and Scott-Heron playing and recording. The limited personnel during these sessions allowed them to rely mostly on traditional African and R&B sounds and influences, along with more creative and artistic control of the project. More than half of the album's songs were co-written and produced by Jackson. His input also helped solidify his partnership with Scott-Heron, leading to further records together before their split in 1978.

== Music and lyrics ==
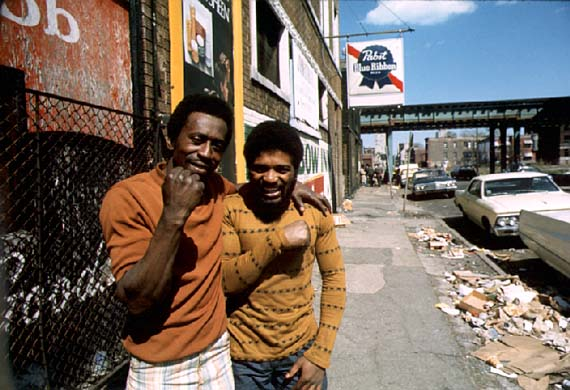
Winter in America's subject matter deals with the African-American community and inner-city life in the 1970s. (photo by John H. White, documenting African-American life on Chicago's South Side in May 1974)

Similar to his studio debut album Pieces of a Man, Winter in America has Scott-Heron exercising his baritone and deep tenor-singing abilities with some spoken-word elements. The album served as a move into more conventional song structures, in contrast to the Scott-Heron's debut live album, A New Black Poet - Small Talk at 125th and Lenox (1970), which was composed entirely of spoken-word poetry, and the rapping style of his previous album Free Will. According to music writer Karl Keely, Pieces of a Man and Winter in America exhibit further departure by Scott-Heron from his prominent "angry and militant poet" persona. BBC Online writer Daryl Easlea wrote that it "captures Scott Heron at a turning point, largely leaving his heavier raps behind in favour of a floating ambience, with his poetry and song being illuminated by Jackson's superb instrumentation". In addition, the album features more themes of social commentary, Afrocentrism and balladry than Pieces of a Man. Winter in America features a more stripped-down production and melancholy mood along with songs that exceeded four minutes, as opposed to Free Will, which was criticized for its brevity and time constraints.

Scott-Heron's characteristic sound on the album is rooted in the blues, jazz, and soul music. He referred to his mellow fusion of style as "bluesology, the science of how things feel." Scott-Heron's and Jackson's compositions for Winter in America incorporate elements of African music, heavy percussion, and chants. They also feature scene-setting, spoken word intros and mystical interludes, which were influenced by the free jazz stylings of contemporary artists such as Pharoah Sanders and Abdullah Ibrahim. Jackson wrote arrangements that tended to be more straight-ahead material, incorporating classic jazz bridges in his compositions. Scott-Heron, as the main lyricist and vocalist, exhibited more pop sensibilities with his compositions and created indelible hooks that were influenced by the black popular music of the time. By combining their distinct approaches to composing, Scott-Heron and Jackson produced a multicultural, diffused sound that evoked the afrobeat and world music style of artists such as Fela Kuti during the African music scene's popularity.

Winter in America juxtaposes themes of nostalgic hope to the social problems of the early 1970s, particularly in the African-American community and inner cities. Also a prominent theme in Scott-Heron's lyrics is people's faith in their culture in a bleak, impoverished environment. The album features Scott-Heron's examination of maintaining one's cultural roots in a discouraging environment. Other themes include love, fatherhood, freedom, alcoholism, and political scandal. The themes of social disillusionment and the human condition featured on the album are also depicted on the Winter collage, representing the grim, sullen images of poverty, decay, and death in generally urban areas and ghettos. Created by artist Peggy Harris, the collage was featured on the original LP's inner sleeve and in the liner booklet of Winter in America's CD reissue.

=== Songs ===
"Peace Go with You, Brother"
The song features bluesy, mellow instrumentation and critical lyrics about cultural roots and disillusionment. It is reprised on the closing track.

The album's style and themes are exemplified by the bookending track "Peace Go with You, Brother", with Scott-Heron's bluesy, jazzy vocals and Afrocentric lyrics accompanied by Jackson's soulful piano arrangements. It features a dreamy, moody soundscape, produced by Jackson's Rhodes electric piano, which evokes the In a Silent Way-era jazz of Miles Davis. "Peace Go with You, Brother" has Scott-Heron criticizing the selfishness of certain members of his generation, as well as people for forgetting their common humanity. The song continues to examine the significance of a person's cultural roots, regardless of where they prove to blossom. "Rivers of My Fathers" is the album's longest track and features drummer Bob Adams' swing-style drum rim shots and pianist Jackson's wide, blocky chords, play in a blue-influenced style. Scott-Heron uses the water motif, a common metaphor in African-American culture, to evoke feelings of home and freedom and represent faith, amid the frustrations of a modern black man. As the opening verse and chorus suggest, "Looking for a way out of this confusion/I'm looking for a sign, carry me home/Let me lay down by a stream and let me be miles from everything/Rivers of my fathers, could you carry me home." The narrator beseeches the "river" to deliver him home; its identity being revealed in the last seconds of the song as Scott-Heron intones "Africa".

The melancholy, nostalgic love song "A Very Precious Time" contains an uplifting timbre of Jackson's flute with joyful singing by Scott-Heron. While his lyrics depict a requiem to innocence and first love, the song's general message explores the concept of nostalgia as a means to remain in the present, despite the loss of hope or faith that can be brought on by the struggle of the present as opposed to the past. The tempo of the album is picked up by the opening vamp of "Back Home", which contains the concept of family and its positive values. "The Bottle" is a commentary on alcohol abuse with a Caribbean beat and flute harmonies by Jackson. It became a popular song played at parties at the time. French music critic Pierre Jean-Critin calls it "an epic song [...] whose infectious groove can still set dance floors alight over thirty years later." The song's dance and popular music sensibilities and social message engendered its appeal to listeners following its release as a single. Scott-Heron later said of the single's success and style, "Pop music doesn't necessarily have to be shit." "The Bottle" also addresses problems of drug addiction, abortion, and incarceration, and features Scott-Heron on keyboards. Despite its grim observations, "The Bottle" became a concert favorite and one of Scott-Heron's most popular songs. It is followed by soulful, low-tempo tracks "Song for Bobby Smith" and "Your Daddy Loves You"; the latter is an introspective ballad and ode to Scott-Heron's daughter Gia Louise.

During the October 15, 1973 session, drummer Bob Adams and bassist Danny Bowens contributed to the tracks "Peace Go with You", "Rivers of My Fathers", "Back Home", and "The Bottle". Adams, however, was disappointed that "H_{2}Ogate Blues" was to be left off the album. The song originally served as an opening monologue concerning the Watergate incident used by Scott-Heron at his concerts, and it contains proto-rap and talking blues elements, in which rhythmic speech or near-speech is accompanied by a free melody and strict rhythm. The studio version, which was recorded during the album's sessions, was not intended to be for the album prior to Adams' objection, as Scott-Heron said that "nobody outside of Washington seemed to know what the hell I was talking about." Scott-Heron later revisited the experience in the liner notes of the album's 1998 reissue. On Adams' opinion of "H_{2}Ogate Blues", he wrote that "His reply was that even if people didn’t understand the politics it’s still funny as hell." On the recording, Scott-Heron stated:

So we sat up to do one take, a 'live ad-lib' to a blues backing ... and the poem was done with a few index cards with notes to be sure I got the references straight without stumbling. (I still stumbled anyway) After we got through it we listened to it play back with an open studio mike and became the audience ... The poem worked well. It felt like what the album had been missing. Not just the political aspect, but as Bob has said, for the laughs. The Watergate incident itself was not funny and neither were its broader implications, but as a release, a relief of tension of Winter in America it provided a perfect landing.

The resulting track features sharp criticism by Scott-Heron of then-US president Richard Nixon and his vice-president Spiro Agnew, among other politicians involved in the scandal; the Watergate incident had yet to reach its conclusion when the song was recorded. Scott-Heron introduces the song with a short speech discussing the blues and referencing current events: "But lately we had Frank Rizzo with the 'Lie Detector Blues'/We done had the United States government talkin bout the 'Energy Crisis Blues'". The final chorus line directly references Nixon and the scandal: "And there are those who swear that've seen King Richard/Beneath that cesspool–Watergate". His lyrics range from humor to critical diatribes of political corruption and social issues. It shares lyrical similarities to Stevie Wonder's anti-Nixon song "You Haven't Done Nothin'" (1974). The album concludes with a reprisal of the opening track. Music writer Karl Keely said of its significance, "The return of the refrain from 'Peace Go with You Brother' adds a sense of wholeness to end the record, an idea that the album has travelled through Gil Scott-Heron's worries, fears, pleasures, hopes, and finally, his pronounced disliking of Richard Nixon, before returning to the opening statement, in the hopes that the record may have made that selfish brother think more about his world and those in it, instead of moving along in a self-imposed bubble."

"Winter in America (Live)"
The live recording has a mystic jazz style and themes of social disillusionment, a dystopian state, and references to democracy and the environment.

The title track, which was not featured on the original LP, was recorded after the album's release at the suggestion of Peggy Harris, the artist who designed the Winter collage for the inner sleeve of the LP. Initially, Scott-Heron and Jackson meant for Winter in America to lack a title track, which contrasted their previous label's trend of having their work include title tracks. The album title's purpose meant only to describe the general theme of Winter in America's songs. According to Scott-Heron, a title track "separates from the rest of the lyrics, better, or worse or different." The studio version of "Winter in America" was released on his following album, The First Minute of a New Day (1975), while a live version, recorded in 1982 at Washington, D.C.'s Black Wax Club, was included on the 1998 CD reissue of Winter in America. The song features Scott-Heron's poetic references and lyrics that portray America in a dystopian state where "democracy is rag-time on the corner", "the forest is buried beneath the highway", "robins are perched in barren treetops", and, in conclusion, "no one is fighting because no one knows what to save."

== Title and packaging ==
The original name of the album was intended to be Supernatural Corner, named after the cover art, but was later changed to Winter in America by Scott-Heron. Both the title and the song "Supernatural Corner" were left off the album, as the name would not be understandable to people who had not seen the house to which the title was alluding. According to Gil Scott-Heron, the original title referred to what appeared to him to be a haunted house in the Logan Circle neighborhood of Washington, D.C., in which Scott-Heron and Jackson moved into prior to recording in 1973. The cover artwork features a collage-type painting with oriental graphic designs and a small figure version of whom appears to be Brian Jackson. It was created by Eugene Coles, a friend and colleague of Jackson's and Scott-Heron's from the historically black college Morgan State University. Supernatural Corner by Coles was used as the album's cover art, as Scott-Heron had originally commissioned Coles to design the collage.

The revised title of Winter in America was intended to represent Scott-Heron's use of the season of winter as a metaphor and concept of his view of the issues facing society during his time. The title was also meant to represent the urban sociological themes featured on the album, which had surfaced on most of Scott-Heron's previous work. Scott-Heron referred to the title as the "overall atmosphere of the album", as well as the metaphor for the overall theme of the album. Winter was conceived amid social, economic and political issues in the United States during the early 1970s, including stagflation, the 1973 oil crisis that had great effect during the winter, the 1973 stock market crash, the Watergate scandal, and urban decay. He further elaborated on the social concept of winter and Afrocentricism, as it relates to living during times such as these and how the title reflects on the time itself, in the original LP liner notes:

At the end of 360 degrees, Winter is a metaphor: a term not only used to describe the season of ice, but the period of our lives through which we are travelling. In our hearts we feel that spring is just around the corner: a spring of brotherhood and united spirits among people of color. Everyone is moving, searching. There is a restlessness within our souls that keeps us questioning, discovering and struggling against a system that will not allow us space and time for fresh expression. Western iceman have attempted to distort time. Extra months on the calendar and daylight saved what was Eastern Standard. We approach winter the most depressing period in the history of this industrial empire, with threats of oil shortages and energy crises. But we, as Black people, have been a source of endless energy, endless beauty and endless determination. I have many things to tell you about tomorrow’s love and light. We will see you in Spring.

In a February 2009 interview with Jalylah Burrell of Vibe magazine, Gil Scott-Heron discussed the album's concept and title, as well as the social and political atmosphere at the time of Winter in America's recording. In retrospect, he stated "We felt as though we had come across something that people did not understand or did not recognize but that's the season that we were going into, not for three months but for an extended period of time. A lot of the folks who represented summer and spring and fall had been killed and assassinated. The only season left is winter. ...Bobby Kennedy and Dr. King and John Kennedy, those were folks who represented spring and summer, and they killed them. So we wanted to do an album about where we were. And we weren't trying to depress people, hell, they were living it, they already knew but we were trying to describe it and were certainly not alone... we felt as though a part of it was the folks in charge of the political structure. They were snowmen..."

== Release and reception ==
Retrospective professional reviews
Review scores
Source	Rating
AllMusic	5/5 stars
Christgau's Record Guide	C+
DownBeat	4.5/5 stars
Pitchfork	9.3/10
Uncut	4/5 stars

Upon its original stereo LP release in May 1974, the album had a short supply and distribution due to the Strata-East label's independent distribution policy of their artists' releases. Consequently, Winter in America became considered by many fans to be the great "lost" Gil Scott-Heron album, before a proper reissue on compact disc thirty years following its original issue. The album served as the first of their collaborations to have Jackson receive co-billing for a release. Unlike Scott-Heron's previous albums, Winter in America experienced some commercial success with the help of promotional resources in the form of underground music deejays and club promoters, in spite of the album's limited distribution. While it did not chart on the U.S. Billboard Pop Albums chart, the album charted on the Top Jazz Albums chart and peaked at number six. Winter in America entered the Top Jazz Albums on June 29, 1974, and remained there for 40 weeks, until March 29, 1975. According to a 1990 Los Angeles Times article on Scott-Heron, the album ended up selling more than 300,000 copies.

Winter in America's only single release, "The Bottle", soon became an underground and cult hit following its issue. The song peaked at number 98 on the Billboard Hot Soul Singles on the week ending February 18, 1977. According to an article on Scott-Heron for a November 1974 issue of Billboard, the success of the single "has made his most recent album, 'Winter in America', a national best-seller and heralds his wide-ranging appeal." The success of "The Bottle" also helped lead to Jackson's and Scott-Heron's following recording contract with Arista Records, which had been established in late 1974, the label at which they would enjoy further success and a larger amount of commercial notice. Upon signing them, Arista executive Clive Davis said of Scott-Heron in an interview with Rolling Stone, "Not only is he an excellent poet, musician and performer—three qualities I look for that are rarely combined—but he's a leader of social thought." Along with approval from Arista executives, Winter in America was well received by the underground music scene, in which Scott-Heron earned the majority of his fan base, and added to Scott-Heron's reputation as a socially aware and conscious artist.

In retrospective reviews, Winter in America was well received by critics, who cite it as one of Scott-Heron's best albums. Uncut magazine's Barney Hoskyns praised the album, calling it an "introspective seasonal offering from black poet-singer and collaborating pianist". He also lauded its critical content and called it "a masterwork of ghetto melancholia and stark political gravitas". Ron Wynn of AllMusic wrote of Scott-Heron's performance, in that he was "at his most righteous and provocative on this album", while acknowledging Jackson's contributions as well. BBC Online's Daryl Easlea called the album "an affecting work" and wrote that its title track "should be played as standard on all modern history courses as a snapshot of the stilted hopes and aspirations in the post Watergate and Vietnam War mid 70s America". The Washington Post's Richard Harrington cited "The Bottle" and "H_{2}Ogate Blues" as "classic Scott-Heron works" in a review of its reissue. Los Angeles Times writer Mike Boehm viewed that its title track "sounded a sad death-knell for '60s hopes of transforming change", while calling it a "wonderful mood piece, capturing what it's like to feel oppressed in your soul by outer-world events that seem out of control". Danny Eccleston of Mojo called it an "alloy of Rhodes-laden souljazz with [Scott-Heron]'s razor-sharp beat-poetry" and quipped, "Anger, radicalism, humour and funk from the proto-rapper, thankfully restored to health and liberty."

Dream magazine columnist Kevin Moist stated that the album "further jazzified his mixture of street poetry, soulful spirit, political commitment, and Black cultural expression." He also noted the history of the Strata-East label, and summed up Winter in America's significance, stating "Radically charged but musically mostly stark and low-key, melodic and soulful as hell, sometimes full band flow while at others just voice and piano, all hanging tight under a melancholy cloud of belatedness [...] Thematically, the album reaches back even further than its predecessors in drawing on Black cultural energy as a source of power for facing down the coming political/cultural Ice Age in America. But Scott-Heron was never a one-dimensional ranter, and his pen is as double-edged here as it ever was, slicing into the growing self-destructiveness and sell-out/buy-in tendencies that were fragmenting the Black community, as incisively as it stabs at the jowls of evil in the White House. As badass as it is understated, and really hasn’t dated just a little bit." The Observer called the album a "jazz fusion pillar stone, with a social conscience to boot". Music writer Karl Keely praised Scott-Heron's vocal maturity from his previous work, and noted Jackson's influence for improving and expanding the music's melodic content. Keely commented that it demonstrates "the evolution of Scott-Heron from politicised poet to soulful singer". Pitchfork writer Michael A. Gonzales applauded its humanistic qualities, saying it "boldly proclaims how much we really matter through big pictures and intimate snapshots translated into the mediums of jazz, blues, soul, and literature."

However, Houston Press writer Paul J. MacArthur expressed a mixed response towards its production quality and called Winter in America the "most dated" of the Scott-Heron reissues. The Village Voice critic Robert Christgau said with the exception of the danceable "The Bottle", Scott-Heron "had a better beat and just slightly less melody" when he was reciting in spoken word. In a separate piece, he applauded the 1975 recording of the album's title track as "an evocation of our despondency that is as flawless as it is ambitious".

== Legacy and influence ==
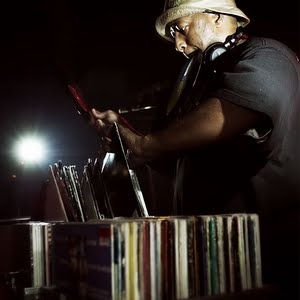
The album's songs have been sampled by several hip hop artists.

Winter in America has been recognized by music writers as one of the prominent examples of early rap, along with the early work of The Watts Prophets and The Last Poets. "The Bottle" was covered by latin soul musician Joe Bataan for his album Afrofilipino (1975). Recordings featured on the album, along with other Scott-Heron/Jackson compositions, were sampled by hip hop artists. This further expanded Scott-Heron's legacy as one of the progenitors of hip hop. The diverse sound and mellow instrumentation featured on the album, referred to by Scott-Heron as bluesology, later inspired neo soul artists in the 1990s and helped solidify Scott-Heron's and Jackson's legacy in the genre. On Jackson's legacy, All About Jazz described him as "one of the early architects of the neo-soul", while citing his early work with Scott-Heron as "an inspirational and musical Rosetta stone for the neo-soul movement". Pierre Jean-Critin of the French music magazine Vibrations wrote of Scott-Heron and the album, stating "As an artist who conceives his albums as newspapers and similar testimonies, Gil Scott-Heron is one of America's finest observers and commentators of social reality as well as being one of the most creative and influential figures in African-American music, and this landmark album announced his arrival."

The album also marked the transition of Scott-Heron from beat poet to singer-songwriter with a full-scale band. He further developed this melodic approach with his following work with Brian Jackson, The First Minute of a New Day (1975) and From South Africa to South Carolina (1976). While the album did not have a direct impact on the black music scene at the time, it proved to become one of the Strata-East label's most successful LP releases, in terms of sales and appeal to their target audience. While serving as Scott-Heron's and Jackson's only album for the independent label, Winter in America helped Strata-East Records achieve considerable notability among other New York City distributors of soul and jazz music during the 1970s, while the latter genre had been viewed by many jazz purists to be in a period of creative confusion and decline. In describing the label and its issued musical works, Dream magazine's Kevin Moist stated "The diversity and experimentation of the music, plus the great quality of many of those experiments, make it seem like more like a creative golden age in which the dominant idea was new ideas mixing and blending cultural styles and artistic genres or pushing existing styles into new extremes." According to Nick Dedina of Rhapsody, Winter in America had impact elsewhere, stating "this deeply felt (and sometimes deeply funky) album helped break the pioneer of protest jazz-soul and rap to the general public with hit single 'The Bottle'".

The album was re-released with previously unreleased bonus material by Scott-Heron's Rumal-Gia label in 1998, following a reissue project headed by Scott-Heron after he had received ownership of his 1970s recordings. The record's significance and influence in music has led to much retrospective favor of it among music writers and critics, as shown in Winter's rankings in several "best of" publication polls. Winter in America was ranked number 67 on New Nation's June 2004 list of The Top 100 Black Albums. The album was also listed in the music reference book 1001 Albums You Must Hear Before You Die (2006). "The Bottle" was later ranked number 92 on NME magazine's list of the "Top 150 Singles of All-Time" and was included in Q magazine's 1010 Songs You Must Own! publication. The title track was included on music writer Bruce Pollock's 2005 list of the "7,500 Most Important Songs of 1944–2000", and it was ranked number 82 on Blow Up's list of "100 Songs to Remember". In June 2026, CBS News included the title track, "Winter in America", in its list of the 250 essential American songs of the past 250 years.

== Track listing ==
Side one
No.	Title	Writer(s)	Length
1.	"Peace Go with You, Brother (As-Salaam-Alaikum)"	Gil Scott-Heron, Brian Jackson	5:27
2.	"Rivers of My Fathers"	Scott-Heron, Jackson	8:19
3.	"A Very Precious Time"	Scott-Heron, Jackson	5:17
4.	"Back Home"	Scott-Heron, Jackson	2:51

Side two
No.	Title	Writer(s)	Length
1.	"The Bottle"	Scott-Heron	5:14
2.	"Song for Bobby Smith"	Scott-Heron	4:38
3.	"Your Daddy Loves You"	Scott-Heron	3:25
4.	"H_{2}Ogate Blues"	Scott-Heron	8:08
5.	"Peace Go with You Brother (Wa-Alaikum-Salaam)"	Scott-Heron, Jackson	1:10

- Sides one and two were combined as tracks 1–9 on CD reissues.

1998 CD bonus tracks
No.	Title	Writer(s)	Length
10.	"Winter in America" (Live at the Wax Museum, 1982)	Scott-Heron	8:23
11.	"Song for Bobby Smith" (Alternate take)	Scott-Heron	4:46
12.	"Your Daddy Loves You" (Live at Blues Alley, 1981)	Scott-Heron	4:25
13.	"The Bottle / Guan Guanco" (Live at Blues Alley, 1981)	Scott-Heron	11:56

== Personnel ==
Credits for Winter in America adapted from liner notes.

Musicians

- Gil Scott-Heron – vocals, electric piano
- Brian Jackson – electric piano, acoustic piano, flute, vocals
- Danny Bowens – fender bass
- Bob Adams – drums (traps)

Production

- Perpis-Fall Music, Inc. – producer
- Jose Williams – engineer
- Malcolm Cecil – remastering
- Vera Savcic, Adam Shore – reissue exec. producer
- Eugene Coles – cover painting
- Peggy Harris – liner collage
- Monique de la Tour/Rumal-Gia, David Lau – reissue art direction
- Scott Townsend – reissue design
- Tony Cerrante, Gary Price – liner photos

== Charts ==
U.S. Billboard Music Charts (North America) – Winter in America

- 1974: Top Jazz Albums – No. 6

U.S. Billboard Music Charts (North America) – "The Bottle"

- 1977: Hot Soul Singles – No. 98

== Release history ==
Winter in America was originally released as a 12" vinyl record, in stereo format only. Released in May 1974 with a limited supply, the record remained out of print for nearly 25 years in the United States until 1998, when Scott-Heron acquired ownership of his recordings, with the exception of his material for the Flying Dutchman label. Afterwards, he initiated a reissue project through his own Rumal-Gia label, which had obtained a distribution deal with TVT Records. The compact disc reissue contains bonus tracks, including the live version of the title track, and the original and new liner notes written by Gil Scott-Heron. Prior to this, a German release of Winter in America was issued in 1992 as was a remastered LP in 1996. However, they did not include these features. Other remasters were also released in Europe, as listed below.

Region	Year	Label	Format	Catalog
United States	May 1974	Strata-East Records	stereo vinyl LP	SES-19742
Germany	1992	Bellaphon Records	CD	660-51-015
United Kingdom	1996	Snapper Music, Charly Records	digipack CD	SNAP103CD
United States	March 10, 1998	Rumal-Gia Records, TVT Records	CD	TVT-4320-2
United States	1998	Rumal-Gia, TVT	remastered LP	TVT-4320
Italy	2001	Get Back Records	CD	GET-8004
Italy	2004	Get Back	remastered LP	GET-98004

== Bibliography ==
- Robert Dimery (2006). 1001 Albums You Must Hear Before You Die. Universe. ISBN 0-7893-1371-5.
- Jason Koransky (2000). Down Beat: Jazz, Blues and Beyond. Vol. 1-3. Elmhurst, IL: Maher Publications.
- Nick Johnstone (1999). Melody Maker History of 20th Century Popular Music. Bloomsbury, London, UK. ISBN 0-7475-4190-6.
- Gary Graff, Josh Freedom du Lac, Jim McFarlin (1998). Musichound R&B: The Essential Album Guide. foreword by Huey Lewis, Kurtis Blow. London, UK: Omnibus Press. ISBN 0-8256-7255-4.
- Staff (1987). Philip W. Goetz (ed.). The New Encyclopædia Britannica. Edition 15, v. 11. Encyclopædia Britannica. ISBN 0-85229-443-3.
- Eric Weisbard; Craig Marks (2003). Spin Alternative Record Guide. 1st edi. (Ratings 1-10). New York, NY: Vintage Books. ISBN 0-679-75574-8.
- Colin Larkin (2002). Virgin Encyclopedia of Popular Music. Edition 4. Virgin Books. ISBN 1-85227-923-0.
- Gil Scott-Heron; Brian Jackson (1998). Winter in America. CD reissue liner notes. New York: Ruma-Gia Ltd./TVT Records.
- Gil Scott-Heron; Pierre Jean-Critin (2001). Winter in America. CD reissue liner notes. London, UK: Charly Licensing Aps/Artistry Music Ltd./Snapper Music Plc.
