= The First Minute of a New Day =

Studio album by Gil Scott-Heron, Brian Jackson and the Midnight Band
- Released: January 1975
- Recorded: June–July 1974
- Studio: D&B Sound in Silver Spring, Maryland
- Genre: Jazz, R&B, progressive soul
- Length: 47:52
- Label: Arista
- Producer: Gil Scott-Heron, Brian Jackson

Gil Scott-Heron and Brian Jackson chronology
Winter in America (1974)	The First Minute of a New Day (1975)	From South Africa to South Carolina (1976)

The First Minute of a New Day is an album by American vocalist Gil Scott-Heron, keyboardist Brian Jackson, and the Midnight Band—an eight-piece musical ensemble. It was released in January 1975 on Arista Records. The recording sessions took place in the summer of 1974 at D&B Sound in Silver Spring, Maryland. It was the follow-up to Scott-Heron's and Jackson's critically acclaimed collaboration effort Winter in America. The First Minute of a New Day was the first album to feature "Winter in America", the title track of Scott-Heron's previous album which was not featured on its original LP release. The album was reissued on compact disc by Scott-Heron's label Rumal-Gia Records in 1998.

== Music and lyrics ==
The First Minute of a New Day served as Jackson's and Scott-Heron's debut for the Arista label and featured the eight-piece Midnight Band. With the Midnight Band and better financial support from Arista, the album benefited from a larger supporting cast and slicker production, in contrast to the sparse production on Winter in America. The Midnight Band would later be featured on following Scott-Heron albums, assisting in production and back-up instrumentation.

The songs on The First Minute of a New Day, which feature themes ranging from spirituality ("Offering") to revolution ("The Liberation Song") and oppression ("Winter in America"), contain jazz melodies by the Midnight Band and funk influences. "Winter in America" featured themes of struggle and had Scott-Heron singing of social, geographical and environmental oppression. The album's only spoken word cut, also a live take, "Pardon Our Analysis" was a sequel to Winter in America's "H2O Gate Blues" as a criticism of President Richard Nixon's pardon, though this time the track did not feature a musical backing of any kind.

== Reception ==
Professional ratings
Review scores
Source	Rating
AllMusic	4/5 stars
Christgau's Record Guide	B
Houston Press	(favorable)
Rolling Stone	(favorable)
The Village Voice	B

Following the little commercial success experienced by Scott-Heron's previous LPs, the album had multi-chart success, which seemed promising for their new record label. Even though Scott-Heron's previous albums, in specific Pieces of a Man and Winter in America, featured singles, they did not chart. However, no singles were released for The First Minute of a New Day, off the album or for promotion.

Following heavy promotion by Arista, the album entered the Top Jazz Albums chart at number 17 on February 8, 1975. It later peaked at number 5 before falling off the charts on July 19, 1975, 24 weeks after its original appearance. The First Minute of a New Day also peaked at number 8 on the Black Albums chart and number 30 on the Pop Albums chart. While not as critically acclaimed as Jackson's and Scott-Heron's previous effort Winter in America, The First Minute of a New Day gave Scott-Heron wider recognition among fans and critics, due in part to its heavy promotion. Tim Sheridan of AllMusic called it "solid, decidedly left-of-center jazz-R&B" and wrote:

This output, with the opening meditation of "Offering" and the right-on "Ain't No Such Thing as Superman," solidifies Heron's place in the pantheon of jazz poets.

Music critic Neil Tesser described Scott-Heron's singing voice for the album as "mahogany, sunshine, and tears." The contributions by the Midnight Band were also praised by critics. Robert Christgau of The Village Voice noted that "the free-jazz-gone-populist band generates so much rhythmic energy that it carries over the weak spots".

== Track listing ==
All songs written by Gil Scott-Heron and Brian Jackson, except where noted.

Side one

1. "Offering" – 3:34
2. "The Liberation Song (Red, Black and Green)" – 6:18
3. "Must Be Something" (Jackson, Danny Bowens, Scott-Heron, Bob Adams) – 5:16
4. "Ain't No Such Thing as Superman" (Scott-Heron) – 4:13
5. "Pardon Our Analysis (We Beg Your Pardon)" – 8:01

Side two

1. "Guerilla" (Scott-Heron) – 7:49
2. "Winter in America" (Scott-Heron) – 6:09
3. "Western Sunrise" (Bilal Sunni Ali) – 5:16
4. "Alluswe" – 5:04

=== Bonus tracks ===
All bonus cuts for the CD reissue were managed and produced by Malcolm Cecil.

1. "A Talk: Bluesology / Black History / Jaws / The Revolution Will Not Be Televised" - Live at The Wax Museum 1982 – 10:41
2. "Winter in America" - 1978 Solo Version – 6:26

== Charts ==
Billboard Music Charts (North America) – The First Minute of a New Day

- 1975: Jazz Albums – #5
- 1975: Black Albums – #8
- 1975: Pop Albums – #30

== Personnel ==
=== Musicians ===
- Gil Scott-Heron – vocals, piano, electric piano, guitar
- Brian Jackson – synthesizer, keyboards, flute, vocals
- Bilal Sunni Ali – flute, harmonica, saxophone
- Danny Bowens – bass
- Eddie Knowles − percussion, conga
- Barnett Williams − percussion
- Victor Brown – percussion, vocals
- Charlie Saunders – congas, drums
- Bob Adams – drums
- Victor Bowens – tambourine, vocals, bells

=== Additional personnel ===
- Perpis-Fall Music, Inc. – producer
- Jose Williams – engineer, production assistance
- David Lau – artwork
- Vera Savcic, Adam Shore – reissue exec. producer
- Malcolm Cecil – remastering, reissue engineer
