= Free Will (Gil Scott-Heron album) =

1972 studio album by Gil Scott-Heron

Studio album by Gil Scott-Heron
- Released: August 1972
- Recorded: March 2–3, 1972
- Studio: RCA (New York, New York)
- Genre: Progressive soul, jazz-funk
- Length: 36:43
- Label: Flying Dutchman/RCA; FD-10153
- Producer: Bob Thiele

Gil Scott-Heron chronology
Pieces of a Man (1971)	Free Will (1972)	The Revolution Will Not Be Televised (1974)

Professional ratings
Review scores
Source	Rating
AllMusic	3/5 stars
DownBeat	4/5 stars
The Guardian	4/5 stars
The Philadelphia Inquirer	3/5 stars
PopMatters	(favorable)
The Rolling Stone Album Guide	3/5 stars
The Virgin Encyclopedia of Popular Music	3/5 stars

Free Will is the second studio album by the American poet and musician Gil Scott-Heron, released in August 1972 on Flying Dutchman Records. The album was produced by Bob Thiele, with the recording sessions taking place on March 2 and 3, 1972, at RCA Studios in New York City. It is the follow-up to Scott-Heron's critically acclaimed studio debut, Pieces of a Man (1971), and it is the second album to feature him working with keyboardist Brian Jackson. Free Will is also Scott-Heron's final studio album for Flying Dutchman. The album reissued on compact disc in 2001 by Bluebird Records with alternative takes of eight tracks from the original album.

== Music ==
Free Will featured a format that divides the LP's two sides, musically. The first side is made up of five recordings done by Scott-Heron and the entire band, which once again featured Brian Jackson playing a major role as he did on the previous album, Pieces of a Man. The title track opens up the album with a meditation on personal responsibility. One of Scott-Heron's best known performances, "The Get out of the Ghetto Blues" is a moving ghetto warning and features bluesy instrumentation by pianist Brian Jackson and guitarist David Spinozza. The second side functions more as a live rap session with Brian Jackson on flute and a couple of percussionists. "Ain't No New Thing" emphasizes Scott-Heron's black pride, which he previously displayed on his debut album, by presenting an argument about the placement of black culture into the American mainstream:

We used to white people tryin' to rob us
Why don't they try stealing some of this poverty
It ain't no new thing … anything they don't understand
They try to destroy
We used to having black innovators
copied and sent back to us
We used to having people try to rob us,
it ain't no new thing

— Gil Scott-Heron, "Ain't No New Thing"

"Wiggy" is a haiku-like appreciation of natural black hair. The themes of police brutality, violence, and self-exploration are still present as they were on Scott-Heron's previous albums. "No Knock", a reference to a police policy whereby knocking is not required before entering a house, and "... And Then He Wrote Meditations", a tribute to John Coltrane, continue these themes.

== Track listing ==
Side one
No.	Title	Writer(s)	Length
1.	"Free Will"	Gil Scott-Heron, Brian Jackson	3:30
2.	"The Middle of Your Day"	Scott-Heron, Jackson	4:30
3.	"The Get out of the Ghetto Blues"	Scott-Heron, Jackson	5:04
4.	"Speed Kills"	Scott-Heron, Jackson	3:15
5.	"Did You Hear What They Said?"	Scott-Heron, Jackson	3:28

Side two
No.	Title	Writer(s)	Length
6.	"The King Alfred Plan"	Scott-Heron	2:45
7.	"No Knock"	Scott-Heron	2:12
8.	"Wiggy"	Scott-Heron	1:38
9.	"Ain't No New Thing"	Scott-Heron	4:29
10.	"Billy Green Is Dead"	Scott-Heron	1:30
11.	"Sex Education: Ghetto Style"	Scott-Heron	0:50
12.	"... And Then He Wrote Meditations"	Scott-Heron	3:14

2001 reissue bonus tracks
No.	Title	Writer(s)	Length
13.	"Free Will" (Alternate take)	Scott-Heron, Jackson	3:02
14.	"Speed Kills" (Alternate take)	Scott-Heron, Jackson	3:25
15.	"The King Alfred Plan" (Alternate take)	Scott-Heron	3:01
16.	"No Knock" (Alternate take)	Scott-Heron	2:04
17.	"Wiggy" (Alternate take)	Scott-Heron	1:35
18.	"Ain't No New Thing" (Breakdown take)	Scott-Heron	3:34
19.	"Billy Green Is Dead" (Breakdown take)	Scott-Heron	2:57
20.	"Free Will" (Breakdown take)	Scott-Heron, Jackson	2:53

== Personnel ==
Musicians

- Gil Scott-Heron – vocals (all tracks)
- Horace Ott – conductor, arranger
- Brian Jackson – acoustic and electric pianos, vocals, flute, bells (1–5)
- Gerald Jemmott – bass (1–5)
- Bernard Purdie – drums (1–5)
- Eddie Knowles – percussion (6–12)
- Charles Saunders – percussion (6–12)
- David Spinozza – guitar (1–5)
- Hubert Laws – flute, piccolo (1–5)

Production

- Bob Thiele – producer
- Bob Simpson – mixing
- Charles Stewart – cover photo
