= It's Your World (album) =

Studio album / Live album by Gil Scott-Heron & Brian Jackson
- Released: November 1976
- Recorded: July 1–4, 1976
- Studio: Paul's Mall (Boston, Massachusetts); Electric Lady (New York, New York); American Star (Merrifield, Virginia)
- Genre: Soul, jazz-funk, funk, jazz, spoken word
- Length: 73:17
- Label: Arista; AL-5001
- Producer: Perpis-Fall Music, Inc.

Gil Scott-Heron & Brian Jackson chronology
From South Africa to South Carolina (1975)	It's Your World (1976)	Bridges (1977)

It's Your World is an album by American vocalist Gil Scott-Heron and keyboardist Brian Jackson, released in November 1976 by Arista Records. It contains live and studio material. The recording sessions took place in July 1976 at Paul's Mall in Boston, Massachusetts, Electric Lady Studios in New York City, and American Star Studios in Merrifield, Virginia. Scott-Heron and Jackson recorded the album with the former's backing ensemble, the Midnight Band. It's Your World was released on vinyl and re-released in 2000 on compact disc by Scott-Heron's Rumal-Gia label.

== Critical reception ==
Professional ratings
Review scores
Source	Rating
AllMusic	4.5/5 stars
Boston Herald	4/4 stars
Christgau's Record Guide	A−
Sounds	4/5 stars
Virgin Encyclopedia of Popular Music	4/5 stars

In a contemporary review, Mick Brown of Sounds gave the album 4 out of 5 stars and stated: "Gil Scott-Heron takes another step in carving out his singular niche as jazz musician/rhetorician extraordinaire – number one in a field of one". Lawrence Journal-World writer Marshall Fine commended the "fluid aggregation of musicians" and praised the album's "integrity, intelligence and an involving musical style that belies the often-bitter nature of their lyrics". Village Voice critic Robert Christgau said, "If anything proves how serious Scott-Heron has become, it's the infectious groove running through all four sides of this concert album".

In a retrospective review, Maurice Bottomley of PopMatters complimented the album's incorporation of "ballads, poetry, jazz solos, Latin breaks and a hip funkiness", stating "It is raw, passionate and powerful, and at all times the rhythmic pulse and the solo explorations complement the lyrical wizardry". Bottomley viewed that It's Your World features Scott-Heron, Jackson, and backing ensemble The Midnight Band "at their collective peak" and wrote that it "functions both as a document of a particular historical moment and as a fresh musical experience today". U.S. News & World Report hailed it a "masterpiece", complimenting its "mellow funk" and "heartbreaking sonic portraits [...] seething with indignation and sorrow". Boston Herald writer Brian Coleman perceived "an upbeat and compassionate side" to Scott-Heron on the album and cited it as "arguably Scott-Heron's most fully realized work, tempering his early-70s anger with soulful wisdom and uplifting words". AllMusic writer Hal Horowitz called the album "a moving listening experience" and commended its themes with respect to "its Centennial-centric time frame", writing that it "loses little of its impact... [T]hese tunes have lost none of their lyrical edge or incisiveness throughout the years". Horowitz cited it as "one of Gil Scott-Heron's best albums as well as a compelling musical time capsule ... proof of the artist's musical and lyrical acuity".

== Track listing ==
All lyrics are written by Gil Scott-Heron, except for those noted.

Side A (Just Before Sundown)

No.	Title	Lyrics	Music	Length
1.	"It's Your World"	Brian Jackson	Brian Jackson	3:52
2.	"Possum Slim"		Gil Scott-Heron	6:00
3.	"New York City"		Scott-Heron	4:45
Total length:				14:37

Side B (Nightfall)

No.	Title	Music	Length
4.	"17th Street"	Adenola (Eddie Knowles), Bilal Sunni-Ali, Jackson	5:45
5.	"Tomorrow's Trane"	Alice Coltrane	7:20
6.	"Must Be Something"	Jackson, Bob Adams, Danny Bowens	5:20
Total length:			18:25

Side C (Late Evening)

No.	Title	Music	Length
7.	"Home Is Where the Hatred Is"	Scott-Heron	12:10
8.	"Bicentennial Blues"		8:40
Total length:			20:50

Side D (Midnight and Morning)

No.	Title	Music	Length
9.	"The Bottle"	Scott-Heron	13:30
10.	"Sharing"	Brian Jackson	5:55
Total length:			19:25

== Personnel ==
- Gil Scott-Heron – vocals, electric piano
- Brian Jackson – piano, electric piano, synthesizer, flute, vocals
- Danny Bowens – electric bass, vocals
- Victor Brown – vocals on track 10
- Bilal Sunni Ali – tenor saxophone, flute
- Barnett Williams – congas, percussion on track 9
- Tony Duncanson – congas, bongos, timbales on track 9
- Reggie Brisbane – drums (traps), percussion
- Delbert Taylor – trumpet

Technical

- Malcolm Cecil – remastering
