= Small Talk at 125th and Lenox =

1970 live album by Gil Scott-Heron

Live album by Gil Scott-Heron
- Released: 1970
- Venues: 125th & Lenox Nightclub (New York, New York)
- Genres: Jazz poetry, proto-rap, spoken word
- Length: 44:01
- Labels: Flying Dutchman/RCA; FD-10143
- Producer: Bob Thiele

Gil Scott-Heron chronology
Small Talk at 125th and Lenox (1970)	Pieces of a Man (1971)

Alternative cover
- 2001 reissue cover

Professional ratings
Review scores
Source	Rating
AllMusic	4.5/5 stars
Billboard	(favorable)
Uncut	7/10
The Virgin Encyclopedia of Popular Music	4/5 stars

A New Black Poet – Small Talk at 125th and Lenox, also known simply as Small Talk at 125th and Lenox, is a live album and the first release of recording artist Gil Scott-Heron, released in 1970 on Flying Dutchman Records. Recording sessions for the album were originally said to have taken place live at a New York nightclub located on the corner of 125th Street and Lenox Avenue, but liner notes included in the 2012 box set The Revolution Begins: The Flying Dutchman Masters, Scott-Heron himself insists that a small audience was brought to "the studio" and seated on "folding chairs". By the time of the recordings, Scott-Heron had published a volume of poetry and his first novel, The Vulture. Well received by music critics, who found Scott-Heron's material imaginative, Small Talk at 125th and Lenox has been described as "a volcanic upheaval of intellectualism and social critique" by AllMusic editor John Bush.

== Track listing ==
All tracks are written by Gil Scott-Heron.

Side one
No.	Title	Length
1.	"Introduction/The Revolution Will Not Be Televised"	3:17
2.	"Omen"	1:45
3.	"Brother"	2:35
4.	"Comment #1"	4:26
5.	"Small Talk at 125th & Lenox"	1:20
6.	"The Subject Was Faggots"	3:10
7.	"Evolution (And Flashback)"	3:20

Side two
No.	Title	Length
1.	"Plastic Pattern People"	2:50
2.	"Whitey on the Moon"	1:57
3.	"The Vulture"	2:00
4.	"Enough"	8:37
5.	"Paint It Black"	0:30
6.	"Who'll Pay Reparations on My Soul?"	4:20
7.	"Everyday"	4:20

- "Who'll Pay Reparations on My Soul?" runs at 5:14 on CD reissue.

== Personnel ==
- David Barnes – percussion, vocals
- Charlie Saunders, Eddie Knowles – congas
- Gil Scott-Heron – guitar, piano, vocals

Technical

- Charles Stewart – cover art
- Bob Thiele – producer

== Legacy ==
"Comment #1" is prominently sampled in the songs "Lost in the World" and “Who Will Survive In America” from Kanye West’s fifth studio album, My Beautiful Dark Twisted Fantasy (2010).

Leon Bridges performed a new rendition of "Whitey on the Moon" in the 2018 Damien Chazelle film First Man, which was also included on the film's soundtrack album.
