= Perpis-Fall Music, Inc. =

Perpis-Fall Music, Inc. or Perpis-Fall Music (pur-puhs fawl) is a pseudonym and production credit for the musical partnership of:

- Gil Scott-Heron, a soul poet/musician and hip hop pioneer, and
- Brian Jackson, a keyboardist and neo soul pioneer

== See also ==
- Winter in America
