= Pieces of a Man =

1971 debut studio album by Gil Scott-Heron

Studio album by Gil Scott-Heron
- Released: 1971
- Recorded: April 19–20, 1971
- Studios: RCA, New York
- Genres: Soul; jazz-funk; progressive soul
- Length: 48:03
- Label: Flying Dutchman
- Producer: Bob Thiele

Gil Scott-Heron chronology
Small Talk at 125th and Lenox (1970)	Pieces of a Man (1971)	Free Will (1972)

Singles from Pieces of a Man
- 1. "Home Is Where the Hatred Is" Released: 1971

Pieces of a Man is the debut solo studio album by the American poet and musician Gil Scott-Heron. It was recorded in April 1971 at RCA Studios in New York City and released later that year by Flying Dutchman Records. The album followed Scott-Heron's debut live album Small Talk at 125th and Lenox (1970); it departed from that album's spoken word performance, instead featuring more conventional popular song structures, with Scott-Heron singing and backed by a full band.

Pieces of a Man marked the first of several collaborations between Scott-Heron and songwriter Brian Jackson, who also played piano on the album. It is one of Scott-Heron's most critically acclaimed albums and one of the Flying Dutchman label's best-selling LPs. Earning modest success after its release, Pieces of a Man has received retrospective praise from critics. Music critics have suggested that Scott-Heron's combination of R&B, soul, jazz-funk, and proto-rap influenced the development of electronic dance music and hip hop. The album was reissued on compact disc by RCA in 1993.

== Background and recording ==
Before pursuing a recording career, Scott-Heron focused on a writing career. He published a volume of poetry and his first novel, The Vulture, in 1970. Subsequently, Scott-Heron was encouraged by jazz producer Bob Thiele to record and released a live album, Small Talk at 125th and Lenox (1970). It was inspired by a volume of poetry of the same name and was well received by music critics.

Pieces of a Man was recorded at RCA Studios in New York City on April 19 and 20 in 1971. The album's first four tracks were written by Scott-Heron, and the last seven tracks were co-written by Scott-Heron and keyboardist Brian Jackson, who backs Scott-Heron with Bernard Purdie & the Playboys. The album was produced by Thiele, who was known for working with jazz artists such as Louis Armstrong and John Coltrane.

== Music and lyrics ==
"Lady Day and John Coltrane"
The ode to jazz legends Billie Holiday and John Coltrane demonstrates Scott-Heron's blend of jazz-funk and blues.

The album's music is rooted in the blues and jazz influences, which Scott-Heron referred to as "bluesology, the science of how things feel." The album features Gil Scott-Heron exercising his singing abilities in contrast to his previous work with poetry. It also contains more conventional song structures than the loose, spoken-word feel of Small Talk.

On the album's jazz elements, music critic Vince Aletti wrote, "the songs have a loose, unanchored quality that sets them apart from both R&B and rock work. Scott-Heron sings straight-out, with an ache in his voice that conveys pain, bitterness and tenderness with equal grace and, in most cases, subtlety. Frequently the nature of the jazz backing is so free that the vocals take on an independent, almost a cappella feeling which Scott-Heron carries off surprisingly well." Uncut writes that "Heron adopts his trademark jazz-funk sound, underpinned by the great Ron Carter on bass, with Hubert Laws' flute fluttering about like an elusive bird of paradise". Sputnikmusic's Nick Butler notes its latter eight songs as "in line with the soul of the very early '70s - think a Curtis that replaces an orchestra with a chamber band, or a What's Going On that replaces head-in-the-clouds wistfulness with earthy indignation, or a There's A Riot Goin' On without the drugs".

"The Revolution Will Not Be Televised"
The opening track features hip hop elements such as spoken word lyricism, minimalist production and heavy drumbeats.

"Home Is Where the Hatred Is"
The song contains socially conscious lyrics, and is one of Scott-Heron's most well-known compositions.

"Lady Day and John Coltrane" was written by Scott-Heron as an homage to influential jazz musicians Billie Holiday and John Coltrane. His lyrics discuss the ability of music to rid people of the personal problems of alienation and existentialism in the modern world. The album features two of Scott-Heron's most well-known songs, "Home Is Where the Hatred Is", which was later a hit for R&B singer Esther Phillips, and "The Revolution Will Not Be Televised", which was originally featured on his debut album Small Talk in spoken word form. "Home Is Where the Hatred Is" is a melodic, somber composition of the narrator's dangerous and hopeless environment, presumably of the ghetto, and how its effects take a toll on him. Scott-Heron's lyrics demonstrate these themes of social disillusionment and hopelessness in the first verse and the chorus.

Unlike other songs on the album, "Save the Children" and "I Think I’ll Call It Morning" are optimistic dedications to joy, happiness, and freedom. The title track, described by journalist and music writer Vince Alleti as the album's best song, is a lyrically cinematic account of a man's breakdown after losing his job as witnessed by his son. Scott-Heron's lyricism on the album has been acclaimed by critics, as the lyrics for "Pieces of a Man" received praise for its empathetic narration. The album's opening track, "The Revolution Will Not Be Televised", is a proto-rap track with lyrics criticizing the United States government, corporations, and mass media; Scott-Heron is backed only by flute, bass guitar, and drums on the track. The song's structure and musical formula would later influence the blueprint of modern hip hop. Because of the song's spoken word style and critical overtones, it has often been referred to as the birth of rap.

== Release and reception ==
Professional ratings
Review scores
Source	Rating
AllMusic	4.5/5 stars
Billboard	4/4 stars
The Encyclopedia of Popular Music	3/5 stars
The Guardian	5/5 stars
Melody Maker	4/5 stars
Pitchfork	9.0/10
Sputnikmusic	3.5/5
Tom Hull – on the Web	B+
Uncut	4/5 stars

Pieces of a Man was released in 1971 by Flying Dutchman Records and fared better commercially than Small Talk at 125th and Lenox. Sales began to increase two years after its release, following Scott-Heron's and Jackson's departure from Flying Dutchman to Strata-East before they recorded Winter in America (1974). Pieces of a Man entered the Top Jazz Albums chart on June 2, 1973. The album peaked at number 25 on the chart and remained on the chart for six weeks until July 7, 1973. "Home Is Where the Hatred Is" was released as a radio single with "The Revolution Will Not Be Televised" as the b-side. However, it did not chart. Pieces of a Man was reissued in the United States in 1993 on compact disc by RCA.

Despite little mainstream success or critical notice during its release, music journalist Vince Aletti of Rolling Stone praised the album in a July 1972 article, stating: "Here is an album that needs discovering. It's strong, deeply soulful and possessed of that rare and wonderful quality in this time of hollow, obligatory "relevance" – intelligence.... the material is tough and real, "relevant" while avoiding, on the one hand, empty cliche and, on the other, fierce rhetoric, its own kind of cliche.... It may not be easy to find, but it's an involving, important album (especially so because of its successful and accessible use of jazz) and it's worth looking for." The following year, Roger St. Pierre of NME hailed the album as "the sound of the black revolution".

Later, the album gained much critical acclaim for Scott-Heron's lyrics, political awareness, and its influence on hip hop. Adam Sweeting of The Guardian praised the album in an August 2004 article, calling it a "pioneering mix of politics, protest and proto-rap poetry, set to a musical jazz-funk hybrid." David O'Donnell of BBC Online described Pieces of a Man as a "great example of [Scott-Heron's] lyrical prowess [which] perfectly showcases the depths of his vocal talent."

== Legacy and influence ==
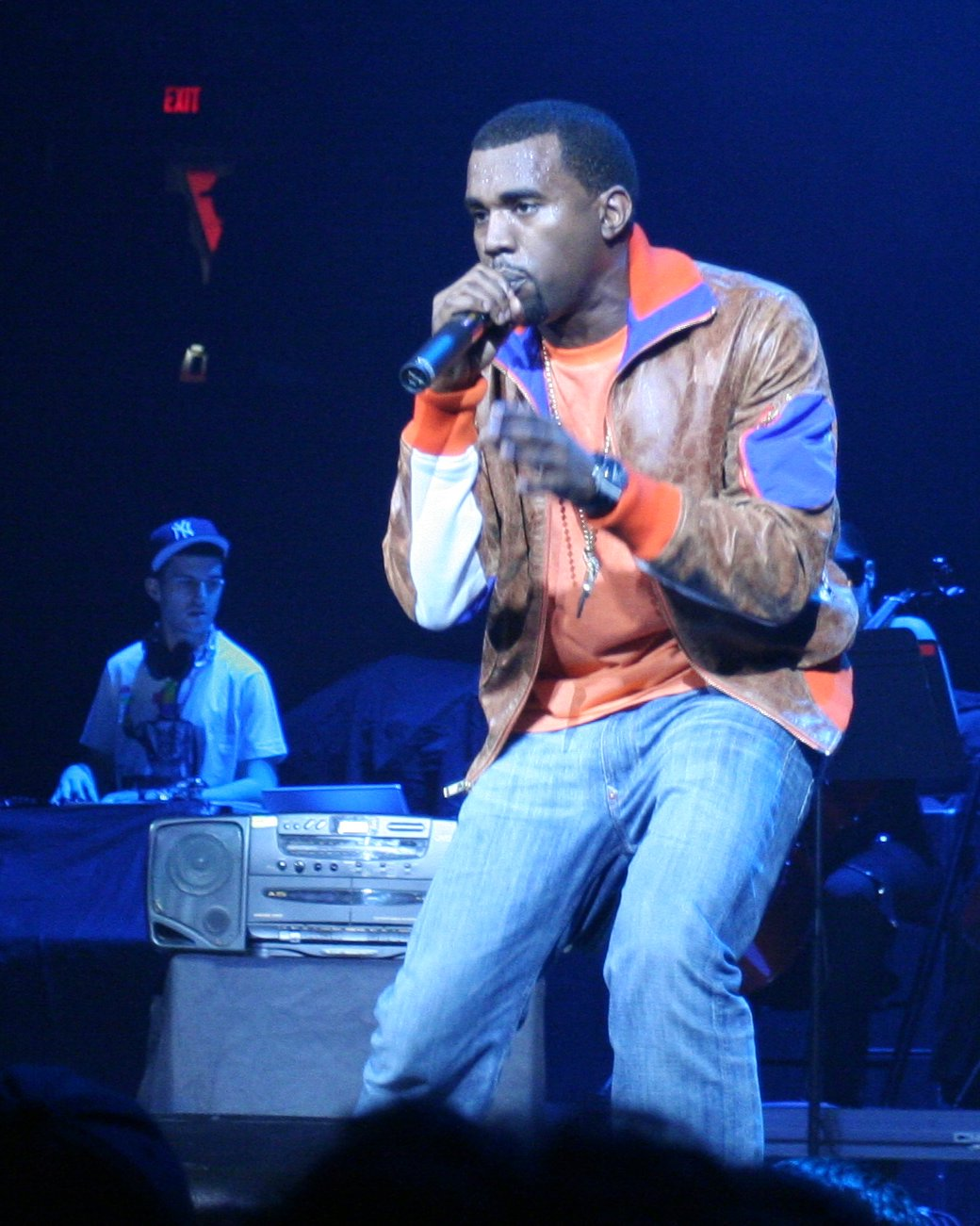
Kanye West sampled "Home Is Where the Hatred Is" on his song "My Way Home", featuring rapper Common.

The album has earned a larger legacy thanks to the influential proto-rap song "The Revolution Will Not Be Televised". In a 1998 interview with the Houston Press, Scott-Heron discussed how much of the album was overshadowed by the controversial song:

[It] was the only political piece [on the album].... Very few people heard 'Save the Children', 'Lady Day and John Coltrane' or 'I Think I Call It Morning'. They just missed the point. The point became one of the 11 pieces. The least inventive one on the album was the one that was the most heralded.... Maybe people were intimidated by the things that we felt were normal to comment on because they were part of our lives.... To ignore part of your life and not speak on it because it might intimidate somebody is not to be very mature.

In a review of the album, Nick Dedina of Rhapsody noted the album's influence on modern music forms, stating "Dance and hip-hop have borrowed (or stolen) so much from this album that it's easy to forget how original Scott-Heron's mix of soul, jazz, and pre-rap once was." In 1996, radio station WXPN ranked Pieces of a Man number 100 on its list of The 100 Most Progressive Albums, and in 2005 it was included in Blow Up's list of The 600 Essential Albums. The blend of sound and instrumentation featured on Pieces of a Man later inspired many neo-soul artists in the 1990s.

Scott-Heron's works have greatly impacted and influenced hip-hop; in 2018, rapper Mick Jenkins titled his sophomore studio album after this album as an homage to Scott-Heron.

== Track listing ==
All tracks are written by Gil Scott-Heron and Brian Jackson except where noted.

Side one
No.	Title	Writer(s)	Length
1.	"The Revolution Will Not Be Televised"	Scott-Heron	3:10
2.	"Save the Children"	Scott-Heron	4:28
3.	"Lady Day and John Coltrane"	Scott-Heron	3:37
4.	"Home Is Where the Hatred Is"	Scott-Heron	3:23
5.	"When You Are Who You Are"		3:24
6.	"I Think I'll Call It Morning"		3:31

Side two
No.	Title	Length
1.	"Pieces of a Man"	4:55
2.	"A Sign of the Ages"	4:04
3.	"Or Down You Fall"	3:14
4.	"The Needle's Eye"	4:51
5.	"The Prisoner"	9:26

== Personnel ==
=== Musicians ===
- Gil Scott-Heron – guitar, piano, vocals
- Hubert Laws – flute, saxophone
- Brian Jackson – piano
- Burt Jones – electric guitar
- Ron Carter – bass guitar, double bass
- Bernard Purdie – drums
- Johnny Pate – conductor

=== Production ===
- Bob Thiele – production
- Bob Simpson – mixing
- Charles Stewart – cover photo

== Charts ==
Chart performance for Pieces of a Man
Chart	Peak position
Belgian Albums (Ultratop Flanders)	168
US Top Jazz Albums (Billboard)	25

== Bibliography ==
- Nick Johnstone (1999). Melody Maker History of 20th Century Popular Music. Bloomsbury, London, UK. ISBN 0-7475-4190-6.
- Gary Graff; Josh Freedom du Lac; Jim McFarlin (1998). Musichound R&B: The Essential Album Guide. foreword by Huey Lewis, Kurtis Blow. Omnibus Press, London, UK. ISBN 0-8256-7255-4.
- Pieces of a Man album liner notes by Gil Scott-Heron and Alex Dutilh. Sony Music Entertainment Inc.
