= Brian Jackson (musician) =

American musician

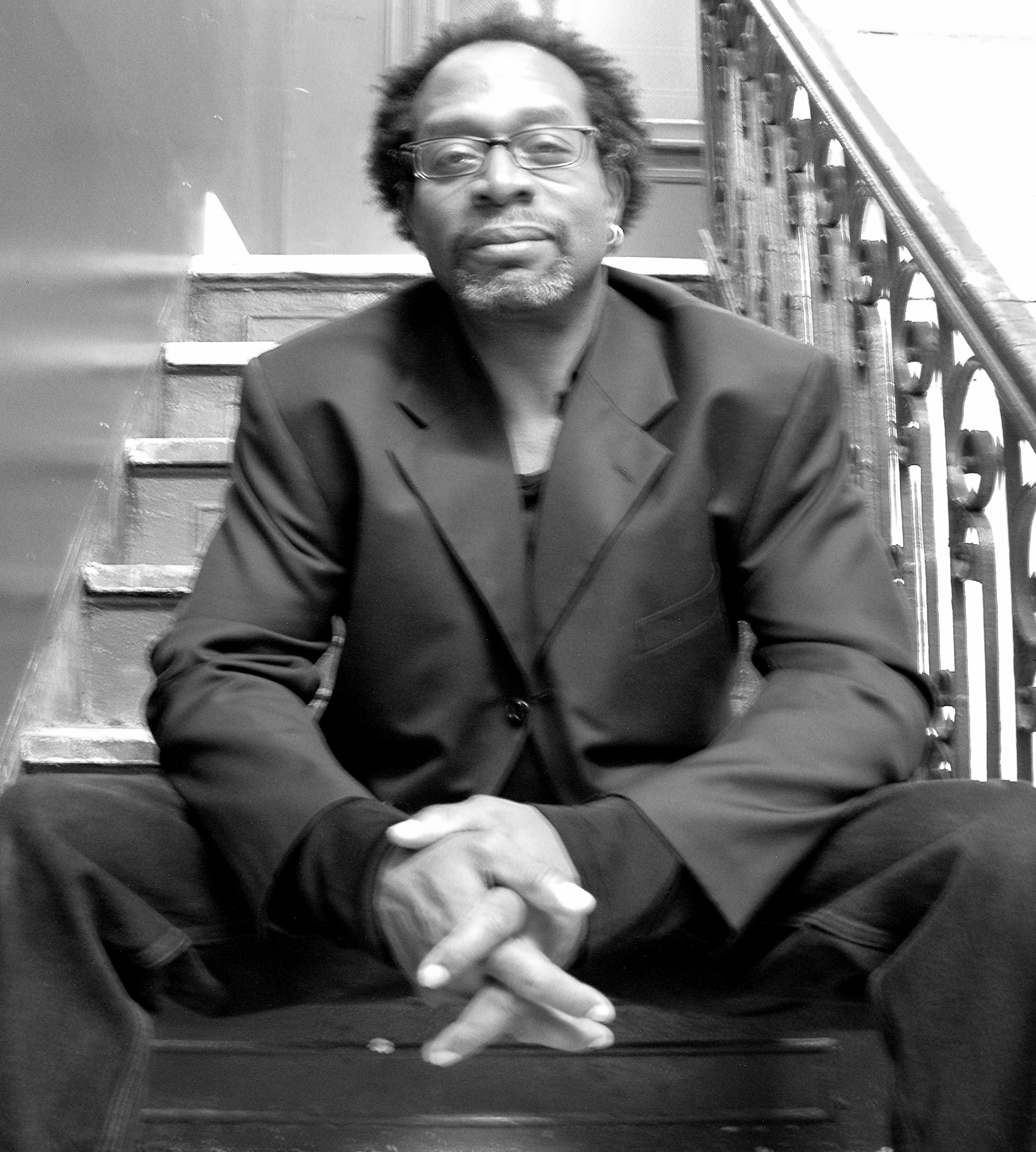
- Jackson in 2005

Background information
- Born: Brian Robert Jackson; October 11, 1952 (age 73); Brooklyn, New York, U.S.
- Genres: Jazz, soul
- Occupation: Musician
- Instruments: Keyboards, flute, vocals
- Years active: 1971–present
- Website: brianjackson.net

Brian Robert Jackson (born October 11, 1952) is an American keyboardist, flautist, singer, composer, and producer known for his collaborations with Gil Scott-Heron in the 1970s. The sound of Jackson's Rhodes electric piano and flute accompaniments featured prominently in many of their compositions, most notably on "The Bottle" and "Your Daddy Loves You" from their first official collaboration Winter in America.

== Early life ==
Jackson was born in Brooklyn, New York, United States, to Clarence and Elsie Jackson, respectively a New York State parole officer and a librarian at the Ford Foundation. He spent the first two years of his life in Bedford-Stuyvesant, Brooklyn, later sharing a house in the Flatbush section of Brooklyn with his uncle Howard, wife Dorothy and young cousin Sidney until his parents separated by the time he was five.

Unable to take on the responsibility of sharing mortgage payments alone, Elsie was forced to move to a one-bedroom apartment in Crown Heights, Brooklyn until she remarried in 1968.

Jackson studied music in Fort Greene with his mother's childhood teacher, Hepzibah Ross (fondly called 'Aunt Heppie') with whom he took lessons for seven years. When Elsie was unable to continue payments for lessons, Aunt Heppie granted him a scholarship, simply stating that Jackson showed 'great promise.'

His mother later married Alvin S. Lovell, a general practitioner from Bedford-Stuyvesant who often donated his services to uninsured residents in the community. In 1968, their daughter and Brian's sister, Alison Lovell, was born.

From 1965 until 1969, Jackson attended Brooklyn's Erasmus Hall High School, where he met other musicians and began to form bands on the outside while participating in school music programs.

== Career ==
Jackson met Gil Scott-Heron while the two were attending Lincoln University (Pennsylvania). They began a decade-long writing, producing, and recording partnership. Jackson composed most of the music that he and Scott-Heron together performed and recorded. In 1971, the two released their first album together, Pieces of a Man, with Ron Carter on bass. Other notable albums include Free Will (1972) and Winter in America (1974), which was the first to have Jackson receive co-billing, and which was later described by Barney Hoskyns in UNCUT as "a masterwork of ghetto melancholia and stark political gravitas". His biggest hit was with Scott-Heron, 1974's "The Bottle". By 1979, they had recorded ten albums, with other unreleased material surfacing on subsequent Scott-Heron releases following their 1980 split.

Jackson continued to be active in the 1980s and 1990s, working with Earth, Wind & Fire, Will Downing and Gwen Guthrie. Jackson's first solo album, Gotta Play (released October 2000), included guest performances by Roy Ayers and Scott-Heron. Jackson's other credits include work with Roy Ayers, Kool and the Gang, Janis Siegel (of Manhattan Transfer), Will Downing, Gwen Guthrie, Pete Miser of (Radio Free Brooklyn) on his solo album, Camouflage is Relative, Alabama 3 MOR, and Carl Hancock Rux (Homeostasis).

From 1983 to 2017 Jackson was a programmer and project manager in the IT Division of the City of New York.

Jackson worked with Ali Shaheed Muhammad and Adrian Younge on a project called Jazz is Dead. It was released in 2021.

In 2022, Brian Jackson released his first solo album in over 20 years, This Is Brian Jackson. It was produced by Phenomenal Handclap Band founder Daniel Collás and released on BBE Music.

== Discography ==
=== Brian Jackson ===
- Gotta Play (2000), RMG
- Evolutionary Minded (with M1 and the New Midnight Band) (2013), Motéma
- This Is Brian Jackson (2022), BBE

=== Gil Scott-Heron & Brian Jackson ===
==== Albums ====
- Winter in America (1974), Strata East – Billboard Jazz No. 6
- The First Minute of a New Day (1975), Arista – Billboard Jazz No. 5, R&B No. 8
- From South Africa to South Carolina (1975), Arista – Billboard Jazz No. 12, R&B No. 28
- It's Your World (live) (1976), Arista – Billboard Jazz No. 20, R&B No. 34
- Bridges (1977), Arista – Billboard Jazz No. 16
- Secrets (1978), Arista – Billboard Jazz No. 3, R&B No. 10
- 1980 (1980), Arista – Billboard Jazz No. 7, R&B No. 22

==== Singles ====
- "Ain't No Such Thing as Superman" (Arista, 1975)[7"]
- "(What's the Word) Johannesburg" (Arista, 1975)[7"]
- "The Bottle" (Arista, 1976)[7"]
- "Hello Sunday, Hello Road" (Arista, 1977)[7"]
- "Under the Hammer" (Arista, 1978)[7"]
- "Angel Dust" (Arista, 1978)[7"]
- "Show Bizness" (Arista, 1978)[7"]
- "Shut 'Um Down"" (Arista, 1980)[7/12"]
- "Willing" (Arista, 1980)[7"]
- "The Bottle (drunken mix)" (Inferno, 1980)[7/12"]

=== As sideman ===
With Will Downing

- Will Downing (Island/Polygram, 1988)
- Come Together as One (Island/Polygram, 1989)

With Gil Scott-Heron

- Pieces of a Man (Flying Dutchman, 1971)
- Free Will (Flying Dutchman, 1972)

With others

- Alabama 3, M.O.R. (One Little Indian, 2007)
- Roy Ayers, Drive (Ichiban, 1988)
- Escort, City Life (Escort, 2019)
- Gwen Guthrie, Hot Times (Reprise, 1990)
- Kool & The Gang, Something Special (De-Lite, 1981)
- Charnett Moffett, Bright New Day (Motéma, 2019)
- Les Nubians, Nü Revolution (Shanachie, 2011)
- Carl Hancock Rux, Homeostasis (CD Baby 2013)
- Ali Shaheed Muhammad and Adrian Younge, Brian Jackson JID008 (Jazz Is Dead 2021)

== Personal life ==
Brian Jackson is married and has five children. Brian plans to move with his family to France in the summer of 2024.
