= Secrets (Gil Scott-Heron and Brian Jackson album) =

Studio album by Gil Scott-Heron and Brian Jackson
- Released: September 1978
- Recorded: April–June 1978
- Studio: TONTO, Santa Monica, California
- Genre: Jazz-funk; soul
- Length: 37:38
- Label: Arista
- Producer: Gil Scott-Heron; Brian Jackson; Malcolm Cecil

Gil Scott-Heron and Brian Jackson chronology
Bridges (1977)	Secrets (1978)	1980 (1980)

Singles from Secrets
- 1. "Angel Dust" Released: July 1978; 2. "Show Bizness" Released: October 1978

Secrets is a 1978 studio album by American vocalist Gil Scott-Heron and keyboardist Brian Jackson.

== Release ==
Secrets was released in September 1978 by Arista Records. It was the duo's fifth album for the label. Secrets debuted at number 31 on the Billboard's jazz chart on September 9, peaking at number 11 on September 23. The album reached number 61 on the Billboard 200. Like its predecessor Bridges, sales of Secrets were regarded as unimpressive and continued a gradual slide into commercial obscurity for Scott-Heron, who would eventually be dropped from Arista's roster in 1985.

The album's release was preceded by the single "Angel Dust" in July, later followed by "Show Bizness" in October. "Angel Dust" and "Show Bizness" reached numbers 15 and 83, respectively, on the Billboard Hot Soul Singles chart. According to Arista founder Clive Davis, the album was Scott-Heron's first since 1975's The First Minute of a New Day to reach the top 100 of Billboard's top albums chart, while the single "Angel Dust" nearly became a hit. "Angel Dust" was Scott-Heron's most commercially successful single while he was signed to Arista between 1975 and 1985. Scott-Heron said the song's level of commercial success was comparable to his previous hits "The Bottle" and "The Revolution Will Not Be Televised".

After three decades out of print, the British label Soul Brother Records reissued the album on compact disc.

== Music and lyrics ==
Compared to the duo's earlier works, Secrets introduces a synthesizer-heavy sound influenced by disco. Jackson first recorded with TONTO the prior year on "We Almost Lost Detroit" for Bridges. On Secrets, Jackson took the band's sound in the direction of funk, away from the "Afro jazz vibe" found on earlier records like The First Minute of a New Day and From South Africa to South Carolina. Secrets also marked the first appearance of female backup vocalists as performers with the Midnight Band, and these same vocalists also played with the band on the ensuing tour.

Scott-Heron's lyrics on Secrets largely concern socially conscious political themes, in line with most of his works from the mid-to-late 1970s. However, his decision to double-down on directly political lyrics was somewhat at odds with the expectations of Arista executives, who desired a more commercially accessible direction and had begun scheduling his live act as an opener for chart-toppers like KC and the Sunshine Band and the Spinners. Meanwhile, Jackson strived for more extended musical explorations; though he agreed with Scott-Heron's political message, he felt musically restrained by the emphasis on lyrics. Speaking about the Secrets era in their career, Jackson said:

Solos would last forever. Gil did spend a lot of time on the side playing tambourine, and in retrospect maybe that wasn't so cool. At one point he told me, "I'm a blues singer, y'know." My job was to help Gil express himself, and when I wasn't able to do that any more I felt a little ashamed.

The songs on Secrets cover a variety of topics and social issues. "Angel Dust" takes on the topic of addiction, returning to a theme Scott-Heron had previously explored on "The Bottle". "Angola, Louisiana" tackles prison conditions in the United States. Taking its title from the Louisiana State Penitentiary's nickname "Angola", the protest song decries the wrongful imprisonment of Gary Tyler. At the time of his conviction, Tyler was the youngest person on death row. "Three Miles Down" is about the issue of coal mining safety, while "Madison Avenue" and "Show Bizness" critique the advertising and entertainment industries, respectively.

== Critical reception ==
Professional ratings
Review scores
Source	Rating
AllMusic	3.5/5 stars
Christgau's Record Guide	B+
The Great Rock Discography (2006, 8th ed.)	6/10
The New Rolling Stone Record Guide (1983, 2nd ed.)	3/5 stars
Virgin Encyclopedia of 70s Music	3/5 stars

A review in Black Stars by Julie Ellis praised the album's lyrical storytelling, socially conscious messages, and broad appeal to pop, R&B, and jazz listeners alike; writing for the same magazine, Roy Betts said Secrets "exemplifies a real purpose—exploring the problems of the poor, the downtrodden, the people who seek refuge in drugs and not the betterment of their social condition." Reviewing for The Village Voice in 1979, Robert Christgau lamented the lack of hooks on songs such as "Third World Revolution" but appreciated "Show Bizness" for its "tribulations-of-stardom" theme and "educational refrain". Christgau's main point of praise was for Scott-Heron's political flair, writing that he "stokes the protest-music flame more generously than any son of Woody, and in sheer agitprop terms 'Angel Dust,' one of those black-radio hits that somehow never crossed over, is his triumph—haunting music of genuine political usefulness." People appreciated the record's jazz sounds from Jackson and the Midnight Band, calling Secrets "another angry, robust collection of song-poems, this time exploring injustice, drug addiction and revolution".

Retrospective assessments have identified Secrets as a transitional work in the recording careers of Scott-Heron and Jackson, with mixed appraisals of its stylistic departures. Rashod Ollison of The Virginian-Pilot wrote that, with Secrets, Scott-Heron's "storytelling deepened and became more insightful and colorful" than it had been on his records for Flying Dutchman Records in the early 1970s, while Jackson's "innovative use of fat synthesized basslines ... presaged the G-Funk era of '90s West Coast hip-hop." Mark Sinker of The Wire found the use of synthesizers on the record "every bit as funky, smart and subtle as Wonder's or Gaye's or Kashif's", yet for Sinker the overall sound was "just not really happening somehow; feels soft-centered, losing the words their edge. Although suggesting that the words are as hard as ever maybe hits on another fault: they're so very much the same as ever." Tristan Bath of The Quietus said the record departed from the jazzy sound and Afrocentric themes of Scott-Heron and Jackson's previous recordings together in favor of "disco and futurist dance music tropes", a sonic detour that would grow "increasingly tacky and saccharine" on the duo's followup album, 1980.

Printed record guides have assigned Secrets positive scores, but typically place it within the lower range of Scott-Heron's discography. Dave Marsh rated the album three out of five stars for The New Rolling Stone Record Guide (1983), and Colin Larkin gave the same score in his Virgin Encyclopedia of 70s Music (2002). AllMusic assigned it three-and-a-half stars on its website and three stars in the print All Music Guide to Soul (2003), but omitted a review in both instances. Martin C. Strong's eighth edition of The Great Rock Discography (2006) provided a rating of 6/10, with a scoring system based on Strong balancing his own judgment against his impression of general critical consensus and reader feedback.

== Legacy ==
In a 2010 interview promoting his final record, I'm New Here, Scott-Heron cited Secrets and Winter in America as "some of my best work", noting his preference for studio sessions when "there weren't a whole lot of people in the studio. Just a whole lot of good music got played, even if it was just a piano and a vocal or something like that." Reviewing Scott-Heron's career for Mojo, James Maycock noted that the success of "Angel Dust" had "helped [Scott-Heron, Jackson, and the Midnight Band] survive the decadent disco era whose insatiable appetite for the fluffy mangled most of their contemporaries' careers."

"Angola, Louisiana" was sampled by hip-hop group P.M. Dawn on the song "Paper Doll" from their 1991 debut album Of the Heart, of the Soul and of the Cross: The Utopian Experience. The album track "Better Days Ahead" was later reworked and released on Scott-Heron's 2014 posthumous compilation Nothing New.

== Track listing ==
All tracks are written by Gil Scott-Heron, except where noted.

Side one
No.	Title	Writer(s)	Length
1.	"Angel Dust"		4:13
2.	"Madison Avenue"	Scott-Heron, Brenda Morocco, Brian Jackson	3:06
3.	"Cane"		3:31
4.	"Third World Revolution"	Scott-Heron, Jackson	4:22
5.	"Better Days Ahead"		3:28

Side two
No.	Title	Writer(s)	Length
1.	"Three Miles Down"	Scott-Heron, Jackson	4:18
2.	"Angola, Louisiana"		5:32
3.	"Show Bizness"		2:48
4.	"A Prayer for Everybody / To Be Free"	Jackson	6:20
Total length:			37:38

== Personnel ==
Credits are adapted from the album's liner notes.

- Gil Scott-Heron – production, vocals, rhythm piano (tracks 2, 3, 6, 7, and 8)
- Brian Jackson – production, flute, piano, keyboard bass (synthesizer), TONTO synthesizer, drums (tracks 3 and 4)
- Malcolm Cecil – associate producer, production assistance, engineering, and mixing
- Lenny Peterzell – production assistance, engineering, and mixing
- Barnett "The Doctor" Williams – congas, Batá drums, assorted percussion
- Leon Williams – tenor saxophone (tracks 4 and 9)
- Harvey Mason – drums (tracks 2, 6, 7, and 8)
- Greg Phillinganes – electric piano, Polymoog synthesizer, TONTO synthesizer
- Alvin Taylor – drums (track 1)
- Ralph Penland – drums (tracks 5 and 9)
- Julia Waters – backing vocals
- Marti McCall – backing vocals
- Maxine Waters Waddell – backing vocals

Technical

- Donn Davenport – art direction
- Trevor Brown – photography

== Charts ==
Chart (1978–79)	Peak position
U.S. Billboard 200	61
U.S. Top Jazz Albums (Billboard)	11
U.S. Top Soul Albums (Billboard)	45
