= Philip E. Branton =

Canadian molecular biologist (1943–2023)

Philip E. Branton (June 8, 1943 – September 16, 2024) was a Canadian molecular biologist who researched viral oncogenesis. He was the founding scientific director of the Institute for Cancer Research (ICR) at the Canadian Institutes of Health Research (CIHR) and was involved in the establishment of the Canadian Cancer Research Alliance (CCRA) and the Terry Fox Research Institute.

In 2014, he was appointed an Officer of the Order of Canada.

== Early life and education ==
Philip E. Branton was born in Toronto, Ontario. In his early life, he learned the saxophone and played in a jazz band called the Jazz Couriers.

Branton studied microbiology at the University of Toronto. He completed his PhD in medical biophysics in 1972 under the supervision of biochemist Rose Sheinin. He subsequently undertook a postdoctoral fellowship at the Massachusetts Institute of Technology (MIT).

== Career ==
Branton began his academic career at the University of Sherbrooke. In 1975, he joined the Cancer Research Group at McMaster University, where he remained for 15 years. In 1990, he became the chair of the Department of Biochemistry at McGill University, a position he held for ten years before continuing as the Gilman Cheney Professor of Biochemistry.

Branton held several national leadership positions in Canadian cancer research. He was the founding scientific director of the CIHR Institute for Cancer Research. He conceived of the Canadian Cancer Research Alliance (CCRA), a consortium of over 40 research funding organizations established to coordinate a national research strategy. He also assisted in the establishment of the Terry Fox Research Institute in 2007 and was the chair of its Scientific Advisory Committee. In his later career, he led initiatives to promote research in palliative care.

== Research ==
Branton's research focused on viral oncogenesis, the process by which viruses can cause Cancer. His work investigated the mechanisms that viruses use to disable cellular tumor-suppressing functions and included studies on adenoviruses.

In 1997, Branton co-founded Gemin X Biotechnologies with his colleague Gordon Shore to develop drugs based on their research.

== Personal life ==
Branton married his first wife, Sharon Leah Herzog, in 1966. They had one son, Jason, and separated in 1984.

In 1989, he married Johanne Landry, a former graduate student from the University of Sherbrooke. They remained together until her death from amyotrophic lateral sclerosis (ALS) in 2018.

Branton died from medical complications on September 16, 2024. He was survived by his son, a stepdaughter, and three grandchildren.

== Honors and awards ==
Branton received multiple awards during his career, including:

- Officer of the Order of Canada (2014)
- Fellow of the Royal Society of Canada (2002)
- Queen Elizabeth II Diamond Jubilee Medal
- R.M. Taylor Medal from the Canadian Cancer Society
- Medal for Exceptional Academic Achievement from McGill University
