= Real Eyes =

Studio album by Gil Scott-Heron
- Released: 1980
- Genre: R&B, jazz
- Label: Arista
- Producer: Gil Scott-Heron, Malcolm Cecil

Gil Scott-Heron chronology
1980 (1980)	Real Eyes (1980)	Reflections (1981)

Real Eyes is an album by the American poet and musician Gil Scott-Heron, released in 1980. It was Scott-Heron's first album since 1970 to be made without input from his musical collaborator Brian Jackson.

The album peaked at No. 159 on the Billboard 200.

== Production ==
Real Eyes was produced by Scott-Heron and Malcolm Cecil. A photograph of Scott-Heron and his daughter Gia appears on the album cover; the album's closing track is dedicated to her. "A Legend in His Own Mind" was inspired by the boasting of a friend. "Not Needed" is about the concerns of older, poorer citizens.

== Critical reception ==
Professional ratings
Review scores
Source	Rating
AllMusic	3/5 stars
Robert Christgau	B+
The Encyclopedia of Popular Music	3/5 stars
The Rolling Stone Album Guide	3/5 stars

Robert Christgau wrote that "the switch from Brian Jackson's supportive groove to Carl Cornwell's elliptical horn charts adds intellectual and historical weight to the songs that merely say good things as well as those that put them pungently." The Boston Globe thought that "Scott-Heron has shaken off the pop coating and built his arrangements carefully, usually around one dominant instrument." Billboard opined that "Carl Cornwell's sax and flute work is top notch." The Citizens' Voice called Real Eyes "a powerful statement by one of today's most significant performers."

AllMusic wrote: "Scott-Heron's love of jazz serves him well on 'A Legend in His Own Mind' and the smoky 'Combinations', but make no mistake: Real Eyes is an R&B album more than anything." In a retrospective article, The Wire thought that "much of it sounds like outtakes from Stevie Wonder's albums of the period—even words seem to desert [Scott-Heron], falling away into disengaged rhetoric or weak personal concerns."

== Track listing ==
No.	Title	Length
1.	"The Train from Washington"	4:46
2.	"Not Needed"	3:55
3.	"Waiting for the Axe to Fall"	4:47
4.	"Combinations"	3:37
5.	"A Legend in His Own Mind"	3:40
6.	"You Could Be My Brother"	6:21
7.	"The Klan"	4:48
8.	"Your Daddy Loves You (For Gia Louise)"	3:18
