= Spirits (Gil Scott-Heron album) =

Studio album by Gil Scott-Heron
- Released: 1994
- Recorded: April 1993
- Genre: Jazz, poetry, blues
- Length: 56:34 (CD)
- Label: TVT
- Producer: Gil Scott-Heron, Ali Shaheed Muhammad, Malcolm Cecil

Gil Scott-Heron chronology
Moving Target (1982)	Spirits (1994)	I'm New Here (2010)

Professional ratings
Review scores
Source	Rating
AllMusic	3.5/5 stars
Christgau's Consumer Guide	(neither)

Spirits is the 1994 album by Gil Scott-Heron. The title track is an interpretation of the John Coltrane piece Equinox, and "The Other Side" is a live version of Scott-Heron's 1971 track "Home is Where the Hatred Is" with a new arrangement and many new verses that expand the original to nearly twenty minutes. It was later sampled for "Home" on the 2011 Jamie XX collaboration album, We're New Here.

In the liner notes, Scott-Heron discusses the new, jazzier tone of the record, and the attempts to define his sound:

What do you call reggae, blues, African vibration, jazz, salsa, chants and poetry?... Seriously trying to define it, I've said it's Black music. Or Black American music. Because Black Americans are now a tremendously diverse essence of all the places we've come from and the music and rhythms we brought with us.

This was Scott-Heron's first album in twelve years, and it would be sixteen more years before he would release another. "Lady's Song" and "Work for Peace" were omitted from the vinyl issue, while other songs were edited slightly for runtime.

== Track listing ==
All lyrics and music composed by Gil Scott-Heron; except where indicated

=== CD ===
1. "Message to the Messengers" (4:57)
2. "Spirits" (John Coltrane) (7:49)
3. "Give Her a Call" (5:44)
4. "Lady's Song" (3:14)
5. "Spirits Past" (music: Brian Jackson) (3:00)
6. "The Other Side, Part I" (5:25)
7. "The Other Side, Part II" (6:11)
8. "The Other Side, Part III" (6:40)
9. "Work for Peace" (7:33)
10. "Don't Give Up" (music: Ali Shaheed Muhammad) (5:58)

=== LP ===
1. "Message to the Messengers"
2. "Spirits"
3. "Give Her a Call"
4. "Spirits Past"
5. "The Other Side" (Parts I-III)
6. "Don't Give Up"

== Personnel ==
- Gil Scott-Heron - vocals, piano
- Ed Brady - guitar
- Fima Ephron, Robbie Gordon - bass guitar
- Malcolm Cecil - bass guitar, piano
- Brian Jackson, Kim Jordan, Vernard Dickson - piano
- Rodney Youngs - drums
- Larry McDonald, Tony Duncanson - percussion
- Leon William, Ron Holloway - saxophone
- Ibrahim Shakur - flute
