= Tubbs (album) =

Studio album by Tubby Hayes
- Released: May 1961
- Recorded: March 1961
- Studio: Philips (London)
- Genre: Jazz
- Length: 43:18
- Label: Fontana; TFL 5142 (mono); STFL 562 (stereo)
- Producer: Jack Baverstock

Tubbs (issued as Introducing Tubbs by Epic in the US) is an album by British jazz saxophonist Tubby Hayes. Recorded in June 1961 and released later the same year, Tubbs was the first studio album Hayes recorded under his recording contract with Fontana Records. The album features Hayes in both a quartet and big band setting, and includes two tracks on which Hayes moves to vibraphone.

== Reception ==
Upon release it was noted that Tubbs was bigger and more ambitious than anything Hayes had hitherto recorded for Tempo, an aspect made possible by his recent signing to Fontana. Writing in 1961 for Jazz News, Benny Green reported that "no other albums have been made [in the UK] with which I can draw comparisons [..] this album is unique". Contemporary reviews considered Tubbs to be the "best demonstration of [Hayes's] skills" and "an album of which everyone can be proud". Intended as an introduction to US audiences, Hayes's interpretation of the ballad "The Folks Who Live on the Hill", was even singled out for praise by Sonny Rollins in a private conversation with Hayes during his Half Note Club residency in New York. However, an oft cited point of criticism was that Hayes's vibes playing on Tubbs presented a pale counterpoint to his extraordinary saxophone playing, and that his appearances in a quartet setting were preferable to the big bands tracks, the arrangements for which were considered "conventional" and lacking originality.

Recent reappraisals of Tubbs have been more favourable on the question of Hayes's big band arrangements and on the wider merits of the album, with the Jazz Journal considering Hayes's first album with Fontana to be "a scorcher". A preference for Hayes in a quartet setting is nevertheless reiterated in other reviews, while others question his decision to present three different performance settings as a difficult introduction to new listerners of Hayes's music.

== Track listing ==
All tracks were written by Tubby Hayes, except where noted.

1. "The Late One"
2. "Love Walked In" (Ira Gershwin and George Gershwin)
3. "S'Posin'" (Andy Razaf & Paul Denniker)
4. "Tubbsville"
5. "R.T.H."
6. "Cherokee" (Ray Noble)
7. "Falling In Love With Love" (Richard Rodgers and Lorenz Hart)
8. "The Folks Who Live on the Hill" (Jerome Kern and Oscar Hammerstein II).
9. "Wonderful! Wonderful!" (Ben Raleigh and Sherman Edwards)

== Personnel ==
Personnel for "The Late One", "R.T.H.", "Falling in Love with Love", and "Wonderful! Wonderful!":

- Tubby Hayes – Tenor saxophone
- Terry Shannon – Piano
- Jeff Clyne – Bass
- Bill Eyden – Drums

Personnel for "Love Walked In", "Tubbsville", and "Cherokee":

- Tubby Hayes – Tenor saxophone
- Bobby Pratt, Stan Roderick, Eddie Blair, Jimmy Deuchar – Trumpets
- Don Lusher, Jimmy Wilson, Keith Christie, Ray Premru – Trombones
- Alfie Rees – Tuba
- Johnny Scott – Piccolo
- Terry Shannon – Piano
- Jeff Clyne – Bass
- Bill Eyden – Drums

Personnel for "S'posin'" and "The Folks Who Live on the Hill":

- Tubby Hayes – Vibraphone
- Dave Goldberg – Guitar
- Johnny Scott – Flute and alto flute
- Bill Skeets – Flute and clarinet
- Bob Burns – Clarinet and bass clarinet
- Al Newman – Clarinet and bass clarinet
- Harry Meyers – Oboe
- Terry Shannon – Piano
- Jeff Clyne – Bass
- Bill Eyden – Drums
- Jack Baverstock – Producer
- Chris Smith – Recording engineer
