= Giles Farnaby =

English composer

Giles Farnaby (c. 1563 – November 1640) was an English composer and virginalist whose music spans the transition from the Renaissance to the Baroque period.

== Life ==
Giles Farnaby was born about 1563, perhaps in Truro, Cornwall or near London. His father, Thomas, was a Cittizen and Joyner of London, and Giles may have been related to Thomas Farnaby (c. 1575–1647), the famous schoolmaster of Kent, whose father was a carpenter. But it was his cousin Nicholas Farnaby (c. 1560–1630), who may have turned him to music. Nicholas was a virginal maker, at this time a generic word that included the entire family of plucked keyboard instruments: the harpsichord, virginal, muselar and doubtless the clavichord, and it is for these instruments that Farnaby's compositions are best known. Like his father however, Giles trained as a joiner or cabinet-maker, starting his apprenticeship in about 1583, and gave this trade as his occupation for most of his life.

He married Katherine Roane on 28 May 1587, and first lived in the parish of St. Helen's Bishopsgate, in London. The couple had a daughter, Philadelphia, baptised on 8 August 1591, when the Farnabys moved to the neighbouring parish of St Peter's, Westcheap, and later a son, Richard Farnaby (1594–1623). After Philadelphia's premature death, prior to 1602, the Farnabys had three more children: a son Joy (1599), a daughter, also baptised Philadelphia (1602), and a last son, Edward (1604).

In spite of his social background, hardly suited at this time to a university education, he graduated from Christ Church, Oxford on 7 July 1592, receiving a Bachelor's degree in music. This was the very same day that John Bull, his eminent fellow composer to be, obtained his degree: Bull evidently knew Farnaby, and influenced his musical style considerably.

In 1602 the family moved to Aisthorpe in Lincolnshire, where they remained until at least 1610. Farnaby obtained a position in the household of Sir Nicholas Saunderson of Fillingham, as music teacher to his children. By 1614 the Farnabys had returned to London, registered at Grub Street, Cripplegate in 1634, where Giles died in 1640 and was buried on 25 November.

== Works ==
Farnaby is considered one of the great English virginalists, together with William Byrd, John Bull, Orlando Gibbons, Peter Philips and Thomas Tomkins among others. Unlike them however, he is the only one not to have been a professional musician.

His best known works are included in the Fitzwilliam Virginal Book, which contains 51 of his 52 surviving pieces. Notable among them are 11 fantasias, a wonderful and technically demanding set of variations called Woody-Cock, and short but charming descriptive pieces such as Giles Farnabys Dreame, His Rest, Farnabyes Conceit and His Humour. There are also four pieces by his son, Richard. His entire keyboard works and a biography are available in a modern edition.

In addition to his keyboard compositions, Farnaby also composed madrigals, canzonets and psalms.

== Adaptations ==
- Five improvisations on Farnaby's virginal pieces were written by Edmund Rubbra (1901—1986).
- Two songs by Giles Farnaby appear in a jazz format on a UK CBS record album (63512) from 1969 by The London Jazz Four (a.k.a. LJ IV): "The Old Spagnoletta" and "Bony Sweet Robin". A reissue of this LP on UK label harkit Records HRKCD 8385 is due to be published in September 2011
- "Giles Farnaby Suite: Selected from the Fitzwilliam Virginal Book for Symphonic Band and freely transcribed by Gordon Jacob" was published in 1970 by Boosey & Hawkes, Inc. It is an arrangement of 11 of Giles Farnaby's compositions: 1. Fantasia 2. The Old Spagnoletta 3. Giles Farnaby's Dreame 4. Farnaby's Conceit 5. His Rest 6. His Humour 7. Tell Mee, Daphne 8. Rosasolis 9. A Toye 10. Loth to Depart 11. Tower Hill
- In 1973 an LP called Giles Farnaby's Dream Band was released on Argo Records UK. The band consisted of a one-off collaboration between three respected British early music ensembles: St. George's Canzona, Trevor Crozier's Broken Consort and the choral group The Druids. Backing them were three jazz musicians: Jeff Clyne (bass guitar), Dave MacRae (electric piano) and Trevor Tomkins (drums).
- A song entitled Giles Farnaby's Dream, based on Giles Farnaby's Dreame by Farnaby, appears on the 1976 album Music From The Penguin Cafe by the Penguin Cafe Orchestra.
