= Turning Point (UK band) =

British rock band

Turning Point were formed in 1976. The British rock band was formed by Jeff Clyne (bass) and Brian Miller (keyboards), who had played together in Isotope, Dave Tidball on saxophone and Paul Robinson (drums/percussion), and Pepi Lemer (wordless vocals). They recorded two albums: Creatures of the Night (1977) and Silent Promise (1978), both on the Gull label.
