= Jeff Clyne =

British jazz bassist (1937–2009)

Jeffrey Ovid Clyne (29 January 1937 – 16 November 2009) was a British jazz bassist (playing both bass guitar and double bass).

Clyne worked with Tubby Hayes and Ronnie Scott in their group the Jazz Couriers for a year from 1958, and was part of the group of musicians who opened Ronnie Scott's Jazz Club in November 1959. He was a regular member of Hayes' groups from 1961.

Clyne accompanied Blossom Dearie, Stan Tracey (on his Jazz Suite Inspired by Dylan Thomas's "Under Milk Wood" album), Ian Carr, Gordon Beck (on Experiments With Pops, with John McLaughlin), Dudley Moore, Zoot Sims, Norma Winstone, John Burch and Marion Montgomery. He was a member of Nucleus, Isotope, Gilgamesh, Giles Farnaby's Dream Band and Turning Point in the 1970s. He often worked with drummer Trevor Tomkins.

Jeff Clyne died from a heart attack on 16 November 2009, at the age of 72.

== Discography ==
=== As leader ===
- Springboard with Ian Carr (Polydor, 1969)
- Twice Upon a Time with Phil Lee (Cadillac, 1988)

=== As sideman ===
With Neil Ardley

- Greek Variations & Other Aegean Exercises (Columbia, 1970)
- A Symphony of Amaranths (Regal Zonophone, 1972)
- On the Radio: BBC Sessions 1971 (Dusk Fire, 2017)

With Gordon Beck

- Conversation Piece Part 1 & 2 (View, 1980)
- Experiments with Pops (Major Minor, 1968)
- Gyroscope (Morgan, 1969)
- When Sunny Gets Blue (Turtle, 2018)

With Roy Budd

- Budd 'n' Bossa (Pye, 1970)
- Fear Is the Key (Pye, 1972)
- Get Carter (Odeon, 1971)
- The Internecine Project (Trunk, 2019)

With Blossom Dearie

- Blossom Time at Ronnie Scott's (Fontana, 1966)
- That's Just the Way I Want to Be (Fontana, 1970)
- Live in London Vol. 2 (Harkit, 2004)

With Bob Downes

- Diversions (Openian, 1971)
- Hells Angels (Openian, 1975)
- 5 Trios (Openian, 2010)

With Tubby Hayes

- Tubby's Groove (Tempo, 1960)
- Tubbs (Fontana, 1961)
- Night and Day (Magnum America, 1996)
- 100% Proof (Fontana, 1967)
- England's Late Jazz Great (IAJRC, 1987)
- 200% Proof (Master Mix, 1992)
- Live in London (Harkit, 2004)
- Commonwealth Blues (Art of Life, 2005)
- Intensity: The 1965 Tapes (Tentoten, 2008)
- Tubby's New Groove (Candid, 2011)

With Nucleus

- Elastic Rock (Vertigo, 1970)
- We'll Talk About It Later (Vertigo, 1971)
- The Pretty Redhead (Hux, 2003)
- Hemispheres (Hux, 2006)
- Live 1970 (Gearbox, 2014)

With John Stevens

- Chemistry (Vinyl, 1977)
- Freebop (Affinity, 1982)
- Blue (Culture Press, 1998)

With Trevor Watts & Amalgam

- Prayer for Peace (Transatlantic, 1969)

With others

- Acoustic Alchemy, Simon James & Nicholas Webb Guitar Duo (Mastermime, 1981)
- Acoustic Alchemy, Early Alchemy (GRP, 1992)
- Kevin Ayers, Joy of a Toy (BGO, 1989)
- Pete Brown, The Not Forgotten Association (Deram, 1973)
- John Burch, Jazzbeat (Rhythm & Blues, 2019)
- Ian Carr, Solar Plexus (Vertigo, 1971)
- Roy Castle, Songs for A Rainy Day (Columbia, 1966)
- Centipede, Septober Energy (RCA, Neon 1971)
- Mike Cooper, Places I Know (Dawn, 1971)
- Julie Driscoll, 1969 (Polydor, 1971)
- Georgie Fame, The Two Faces of Fame (CBS, 1967)
- Giles Farnaby, Giles Farnaby's Dream Band (Argo, 1973)
- Michael Gibbs, Tanglewood 63 (Deram, 1971)
- Gilgamesh, Gilgamesh (Caroline, 1975)
- Gilgamesh, Arriving Twice (Cuneiform, 2000)
- Barry Guy & the London Jazz Composers Orchestra, Ode (Incus, 1972)
- Jim Hall, Live in London (Harkit, 2019)
- John Horler, Lost Keys (Master Mix, 1993)
- Linda Hoyle, Pieces of Me (Vertigo, 1971)
- Isotope, Isotope (Gull, 1974)
- Isotope & Gary Boyle, Live at the BBC (Hux, 2004)
- The Jazz Couriers, Tippin': The Jazz Couriers Live in Morecambe 1959 (Gearbox, 2012)
- Marian Montgomery, On Stage! (Cube, 1978)
- Marion Montgomery, Nice and Easy (Jazz House, 1990)
- Dudley Moore, Keep It Up (Decca, 1969)
- Dudley Moore, The Dudley Moore Trio (Decca, 1969)
- Tony Oxley, The Baptised Traveller (CBS, 1969)
- Tony Oxley, 4 Compositions for Sextet (CBS, 1970)
- Tom Paxton, How Come the Sun (Reprise, 1971)
- Annette Peacock, X-Dreams (Aura, 1978)
- Gilles Peterson, Impressed 2 with Gilles Peterson (Universal/Impressed Re-pressed 2004)
- Prince Lasha, Insight (CBS, 1966)
- Don Rendell & Ian Carr, Change Is (Columbia, 1969)
- Ronnie Scott & Tubby Hayes, The Couriers of Jazz (London American, 1958)
- Ronnie Scott, BBC Jazz Club (Gearbox, 2013)
- Zoot Sims, Zoot at Ronnie Scott's (Fontana, 1962)
- Spontaneous Music Ensemble, Challenge (Eyemark, 1966)
- Spontaneous Music Ensemble, Oliv & Familie (Emanem, 2014)
- The The, Infected (Epic, 1986)
- Keith Tippett, You Are Here... I Am There (Polydor, 1970)
- Stan Tracey, Jazz Suite (Columbia, 1965)
- Stan Tracey, Alice in Jazz Land (Resteamed, 2007)
- Theo Travis, View from the Edge (33 Jazz, 1994)
- Turning Point, Creatures of the Night (Gull, 1977)
- Turning Point, Silent Promise (Gull, 1978)
- James Tyler, Ragtime (Desto, 1979)
- Steve Waterman, Destination Unknown (ASC, 1995)
- Working Week, Compañeros (Virgin, 1986)
- Working Week, Payday (Venture/Virgin, 1988)
- Robert Wyatt, Flotsam Jetsam (Rough Trade, 1994)
