= Giles Farnaby's Dream Band =

Studio album by Giles Farnaby's Dream Band
- Released: 1973
- Genre: British folk rock - Medieval folk rock
- Label: Argo (ZDA158)
- Producer: Kevin Daly

Giles Farnaby's Dream Band was a collaboration between the early music ensemble St. George’s Canzona, Derby-based folk group The Druids, and Trevor Crozier’s 'Broken Consort'. They were backed by three jazz musicians: Jeff Clyne (bass guitar), Dave MacRae (electric piano) and Trevor Tomkins (drums).

The album title is a pun on the piece ‘Giles Farnabys Dreame’ by the renaissance composer Giles Farnaby.

The album largely consists of renaissance dance tunes played on a combination of early and modern instruments. This prefigures some of the work later undertaken by the Albion Band and Home Service. It is chiefly notable for its experimental nature, demonstrating some of the diverse attempts at fusion at the time which resulted in subgenres such as folk jazz and medieval folk rock. It is most similar in its sound to medieval folk and progressive rock bands like Gryphon and Gentle Giant. The rarity of the album has made it the subject of enthusiasm for some collectors.

The song ‘Newcastle Brown’ was subsequently released as a single (Argo, AFW112, 1973).

The album was reissued as a CD in 2004 (Walhalla, WH90324, 2004)

== Musicians ==
- St. George’s Canzona
- The Druids
- Trevor Crozier’s Broken Consort
- Jeff Clyne (bass guitar)
- Dave MacRae (electric piano)
- Trevor Tomkins (drums)

== Track listing ==
1. "The Hare's Maggot"
2. "Rufty Tufty"/"Beau Stratagem"/"Appley House"
3. "The Hole in the Wall"/"The Chirping of the Nightingale"
4. "Pastime with Good Company"
5. "Daphne"/"Nonsuch"/"Jack's Maggot"/"Childgrove"
6. "Shrewsbury Lasses"
7. "Newcastle Brown"
8. "Helston Furry Dance"/"Picking of Sticks"/"The Butterfly"
9. "The Indian Queen"
10. "The Happy Clown"
11. "Ratcliffe Highway"
12. "The Twenty Ninth of May"
13. "The Black Nag"/"Poor Robins' Maggot"/"Greensleeves"
14. "Portabella"
15. "The Draper's Maggot"/"Tower Hill"
16. "Mr. Beveridge's Maggot"/"The British Toper"/"London's Glory"
