= Tubbs in N.Y. =

Studio album by Tubby Hayes
- Released: 1962
- Recorded: 3–4 October 1961
- Studio: New York City
- Genre: Jazz
- Length: 39.45
- Label: Fontana; TFL.5183 (mono); STFL 595 (stereo)
- Producer: Unknown

Tubbs in N.Y. (issued as Tubby the Tenor in the US) is an album by British jazz saxophonist Tubby Hayes, recorded in October 1961 and released on Fontana Records in 1962. It was the first New York studio session to arise from Hayes's debut residency at the Half Note Club, made possible through a unique exchange of Hayes and Zoot Sims by the British and American musician unions. Though a prolific composer, none of Hayes's own compositions were selected for inclusion on the album. Instead those selected were either originals composed by session contributor, Clark Terry, or interpretations of jazz standards by Sonny Rollins and George Gershwin.

== Reception ==
Professional ratings
Review scores
Source	Rating
Jazzwise	4/4 stars
Jazz Journal	4/5 stars

Despite garnering respect from New York's jazz elite as a result of his Half Note residency, the album made minimal impact in the US upon release, where reviews of the album were less favourable. A more positive reception was found in the UK but was tempered by resentment in the UK jazz scene at Hayes's transatlantic successes.

Recent reappraisals of Tubbs in N.Y. (Tubby the Tenor) have remarked on the speed, dexterity, and fluency of Hayes's performance. Biographer, Simon Spillett, noted that Hayes "really appears to be dragging the likes of Parlan and Clark Terry along on his coat-tails" and that his playing during this period "represented the finest virtues of tenor saxophone". Critics have also tended to favour Tubbs in N.Y. over Return Visit!, the second and final of Hayes's New York recordings.

Hayes considered the session to be one of his finest, owing to the strong contributions from the New York based rhythm section, which included Horace Parlan, George Duvivier, and Dave Bailey. Terry, in particular, later recalled his session with Hayes to be "one of my albums that I like best".

== Track listing ==
1. "You For Me" (Bob Haymes) - 4:43
2. "A Pint Of Bitter" (Clark Terry) - 7:03
3. "Airegin" (Sonny Rollins) - 8:57
4. "Opus Ocean" (Clark Terry) - 7:34
5. "Soon" (George Gershwin) - 7:36
6. "Doxy" (Sonny Rollins) - 9:15

== Personnel ==
- Tubby Hayes – Tenor saxophone
- Clark Terry – Trumpet
- Eddie Costa – Vibraphone
- Horace Parlan – Piano
- George Duvivier – Bass
- Dave Bailey - Drums
