= Gary Boyle =

British jazz fusion guitarist (born 1941)

Gary Winston Boyle (born 24 November 1941) is a British jazz rock guitarist.

== Biography ==
Boyle was born in Patna, Bihar, India, on 24 November 1941. He attended the Leeds College of Music in the early 1960s and then joined the folk-rock band Eclection. He also played in The Echoes, Dusty Springfield's band in the mid-1960s, and recorded with Brian Auger and Julie Driscoll. In the early 1970s he worked as a session musician with musicians Keith Tippett, Mike Gibbs, Mike Westbrook, Stomu Yamashta, Bert Jansch and Norma Winstone.

In 1973, Boyle founded the jazz fusion band Isotope with Jeff Clyne (bass), Brian Miller (keyboards) and Nigel Morris (drums). This line-up gigged around the United Kingdom extensively.

== Discography ==
With Isotope

- Isotope - 1974
- Illusion - 1974 (re-issued in 2011 by Cherry Red Records, Esoteric Recordings Label)
- Deep End - 1976
- Isotope & Gary Boyle: Live at the BBC - 2004
- Golden Section - 2008

=== Under his name ===
- The Dancer (Montreux Jazz/Pop Award) - 1978
- Electric Glide - 1978
- Step Out - 1981
- Friday Night Again - 1986
- Triple Echo - 1994
- Games - 2003

=== Other projects ===
- "Sketch" with Maggie Boyle and Dave Bowie CD 2007
- Gig with the band Soft Machine NDR Jazz Workshop 1973
