= Return Visit =

Return Visit!

Studio album by Tubby Hayes And The All Stars
- Released: 1963
- Recorded: 23 June 1962
- Studio: New York City
- Genre: Jazz
- Length: 34.67
- Label: Fontana; TL 5195 (mono); STL 5195 (stereo)
- Producer: Quincy Jones

Return Visit! (issued as Tubby's Back In Town by Smash in the US) is an album by British jazz saxophonist Tubby Hayes, recorded in June 1962 and released on Fontana Records in 1963. Produced by Quincy Jones and featuring the "All Stars" of Roland Kirk, James Moody, Walter Bishop, Jr., Sam Jones, and Louis Hayes, the session is notable for being Hayes's second to be recorded in the United States, following Tubbs in N.Y. in 1962. The line-up unusually includes three tenor saxophonists, all of whom double on other instruments.

Unlike Tubbs in N.Y., the session for Return Visit! was an impromptu one, with the "All Stars" assembling at the studio immediately prior to recording. Walter Bishop Jr. was the only player to have performed with Hayes prior to the recording date, and both Sam Jones and Louis Hayes had been performing as members of the Cannonball Adderley Sextet until late the night prior. With the exception of two Roland Kirk compositions, all other tracks on the album are reinterpretations of popular jazz standards, including one from Sonny Stitt.

James Moody was under contract to Argo at the time of recording and so was listed on the release under the pseudonym "Jimmy Gloomy".

== Reception ==
Professional ratings
Review scores
Source	Rating
Jazzwise	4/4 stars

Hayes wrote in the sleeve notes to the UK release that, "My feelings were somewhat mixed, possibly apprehensive. I was about to record with great American jazz men who knew nothing about the date until the day before and whom, apart from the piano player, I had never met." Though well received upon its release and generally rated highly in present-day reappraisals, it is often suggested that Return Visit! it is not as strong as its previous New York session, Tubbs in N.Y.. The impromptu nature of the recording and Hayes's self-confessed 'apprehensiveness' about the session has been cited as a possible cause.

== Track listing ==
1. "Afternoon in Paris" (John Lewis) - 5.47
2. "I See With My Third 'I'" (Roland Kirk) - 9.28
3. "Lady 'E'" (Roland Kirk) - 3.15
4. "Stitt's Tune" (Sonny Stitt) - 9.52
5. "Medley" - 7.25
  1. "If I Had You" (Ted Shapiro, Jimmy Campbell & Reg Connelly)
  2. "Alone Together" (Arthur Schwartz & Howard Dietz)
  3. "For Heaven's Sake" (Don Meyer, Elise Bretton & Sherman Edwards)

== Personnel ==
- Tubby Hayes – Tenor saxophone, vibraphone
- James Moody – Tenor saxophone, flute
- Roland Kirk – Tenor saxophone, manzello saxophone, nose flute
- Walter Bishop, Jr. – Piano
- Sam Jones – Bass
- Louis Hayes - Drums
