= Reflections (Gil Scott-Heron album) =

Studio album by Gil Scott-Heron
- Released: 1981
- Studio: TONTO
- Label: Arista
- Producer: Gil Scott-Heron, Malcolm Cecil

Gil Scott-Heron chronology
Real Eyes (1980)	Reflections (1981)	Moving Target (1982)

Reflections is an album by the American poet and musician Gil Scott-Heron, released in 1981. It was his second album without Brian Jackson. Scott-Heron supported the album with a North American tour. The album peaked at No. 106 on the Billboard 200.

Arista Records mailed a copy of "'B' Movie'" to every member of Congress. "'B' Movie" was a hit on Black radio stations.

== Production ==
Recorded at TONTO Studio, the album was coproduced by Malcolm Cecil. Scott-Heron was backed by the Amnesia Express, the band he formed following his period leading the Midnight Band. "'B' Movie" is a criticism of Ronald Reagan, whose image appears on the album cover in one of the lenses of Scott-Heron's glasses. "Inner City Blues" is a version of the Marvin Gaye song. "Grandma's Hands" is a cover of the Bill Withers song.

== Critical reception ==
Professional ratings
Review scores
Source	Rating
AllMusic	2.5/5 stars
Robert Christgau	B+
The Encyclopedia of Popular Music	4/5 stars
The Guardian	3/5 stars
Knight Ridder	7/10
The Rolling Stone Album Guide	3/5 stars

Robert Christgau called "'B' Movie" Scott-Heron's "smartest political rap ever"; Knight Ridder deemed it "a bitter tour de force." The Tucson Citizen labeled the album Scott-Heron's "slicing philosophy of America's determined return to the years before social conscience and civil rights." The Philadelphia Daily News praised the "brilliantly articulated bad-tidings."

The Independent deemed the album "a classic." The Guardian concluded that, "unlike some of those he influenced, Scott-Heron had enough intellectual and musical flexibility to ensure that his medium wasn't crushed under the ponderous weight of his message." AllMusic wrote that the cover of "Inner City Blues" "swings convincingly, [but] has a lengthy spoken-word riff that fails to embellish on the pain implicit in the original."

== Track listing ==
No.	Title	Length
1.	"Storm Music"	4:51
2.	"Grandma's Hands"	5:24
3.	"Is That Jazz?"	3:43
4.	"Morning Thoughts"	4:37
5.	"Inner City Blues (Poem: 'The Siege of New Orleans')"	5:46
6.	"Gun"	4:00
7.	"'B' Movie"	12:10

== Charts ==
Chart (1980)	Peak position
US Billboard 200	106
US Soul LP's (Billboard)	21

Chart (2022)	Peak position
UK Dance Albums (OCC)	38

Chart (2026)	Peak position
US Top Contemporary Jazz Albums (Billboard)	6
US Top Jazz Albums (Billboard)	21
