= Gary Tyler =

American former prisoner

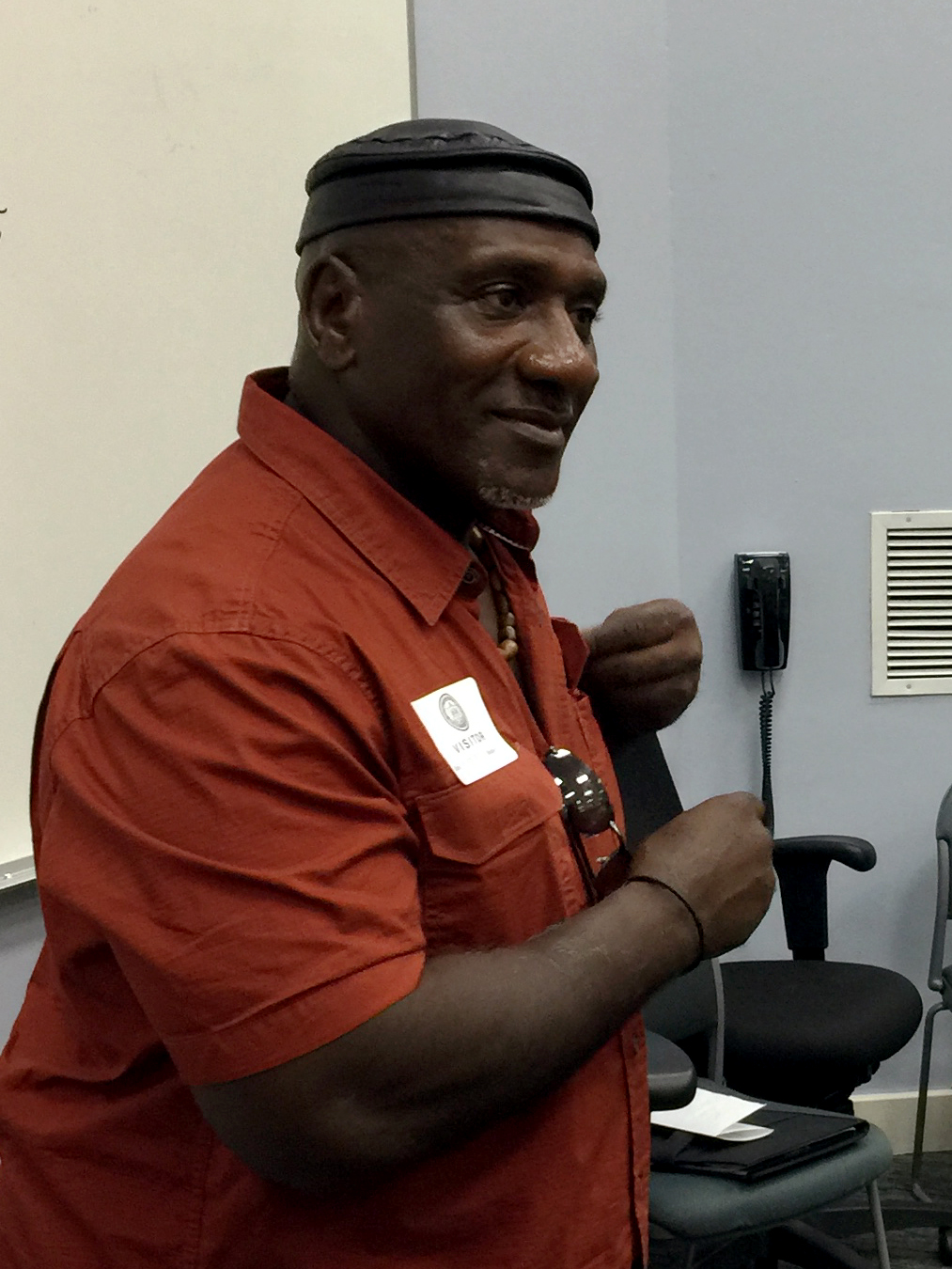
- Gary Tyler, speaking at the University of California, Hastings College of the Law in 2017
- Born: July 19, 1958 (age 68); United States
- Status: Released April 29, 2016
- Convictions: First degree murder; reduced to manslaughter in a plea agreement
- Penalty: Death; commuted to life imprisonment; further commuted to 21 years imprisonment
- Website: freegarytyler.com

Gary Tyler (born July 19, 1958), from St. Rose, Louisiana, is an African-American man who was convicted of first-degree murder and sentenced to death for the October 7, 1974, shooting death of a white 13-year-old boy and the wounding of another at Destrehan High School in St. Charles Parish, Louisiana. At the time, he was the youngest person on death row. Many observers believed that Tyler was wrongfully convicted, especially after several key witnesses recanted their testimony. Tyler's cause was taken up again in 2007 by human rights organizations and a variety of public figures after his case was highlighted by columnist Bob Herbert in The New York Times. In 2016, after serving 41 years in prison, Tyler pleaded guilty to manslaughter, and was resentenced to the maximum term for that crime of 21 years; since he had already served nearly twice that, he was released.

== Background ==
Gary Tyler is one of eleven children of Juanita and Uylos Tyler of St. Rose, Louisiana. His father was a maintenance worker who sometimes held three jobs; his mother worked as a domestic. His father died in 1989 of heart trouble. Tyler and his siblings attended local schools, which were segregated into the 1970s. When he was 16, he began to take the bus to Destrehan High School. Previously all-white, the school had conducted court-ordered desegregation since 1968, bussing black students to the school. In the school sessions in 1974, racial tensions had been rising, with fights breaking out in the halls and at games. The white community continued to resist desegregation and black students were harassed at the school by white students.

== Events ==
In 1974 formerly all-white Destrehan High School in St. Charles Parish was filled with racial tensions among the students as the administration reluctantly integrated, 20 years after the ruling of Brown v. Board of Education (1954). The school board bussed black students to the school to achieve this.

On the evening of Friday, October 5, 1974, black-white fistfights broke out between students at a football game. When classes resumed on Monday, October 7, the morning was marked by "general turmoil, fighting, stabbing and other acts of violence." School officials decided to dismiss all students early due to the racial clashes.

Earlier that morning, Tyler had been suspended from school. He and a companion were picked up later that day on a road leading to the school by a Deputy Sheriff who suspected they were truants. The Deputy Sheriff, upon taking them to the school to verify his suspicions, learned of Tyler's suspension, and due to the disturbances then in progress, Tyler was instructed to go home immediately.

Tyler got on bus 91, which was filled with other black students bound for the St. Rose area. As the buses were leaving the school grounds, it was necessary for them to pass groups of white students, together with some parents and relatives who had come to pick them up, assembled along the school driveway and along the edge of the street leading from the school. In all, some 100–200 whites were there. Among the crowd were 13-year-old freshman Timothy J. Weber, his parents, and Roland LaBranche.

As the buses started moving, several objects were thrown from the buses and towards the buses, including rocks and a wine bottle. As the crowd outside drew closer to bus 91, a shot was fired from one of its windows. The bullet shot Timothy Weber through the head and the same bullet hit Roland LaBranche in the arm, wounding him. Weber died in hospital several hours later.

The bus was taken to a sheriff's office under guard with all the pupils aboard. A .45-caliber automatic was later found in the bus. All the students from the bus were taken to the police station and interrogated under extreme pressure.

Tyler was arrested for disturbing the peace when he talked back to a police officer; he was soon charged with the murder of 13-year-old Weber. His mother Juanita Tyler and he said that he was beaten severely by the police in an attempt to make him confess, but he refused. Other witnesses later told of being intimidated and threatened by the police. As columnist Bob Herbert wrote in 2007, "A white boy had been killed and some black had to pay. Mr. Tyler, as good a black as any, was taken to a sheriff’s substation where he was beaten unmercifully amid shouted commands that he confess. He would not."

Archbishop Philip Hannan presided at Weber's funeral, calling on the mourners to "restore harmony and make this again the model community that it was for many, many years." The racially charged atmosphere had been heightened by the arrival of members of the Ku Klux Klan in Destrehan, led by national director David Duke, for the professed purpose of protecting whites. Two Klansmen were arrested on October 9 for allegedly carrying a stolen gun. The intervention of the KKK led Governor Edwin Edwards to declare that he would order "whatever force is needed" to maintain peace in the town. Attorney General William J. Guste remarked, "I think the KKK has no business being there. It's not going to add anything to help the situation, it can only irritate the situation. I would hope law enforcement authorities would handle keeping the peace in that area and that amateurs would not get themselves involved in something they have no business to do."

== Trial and conviction ==
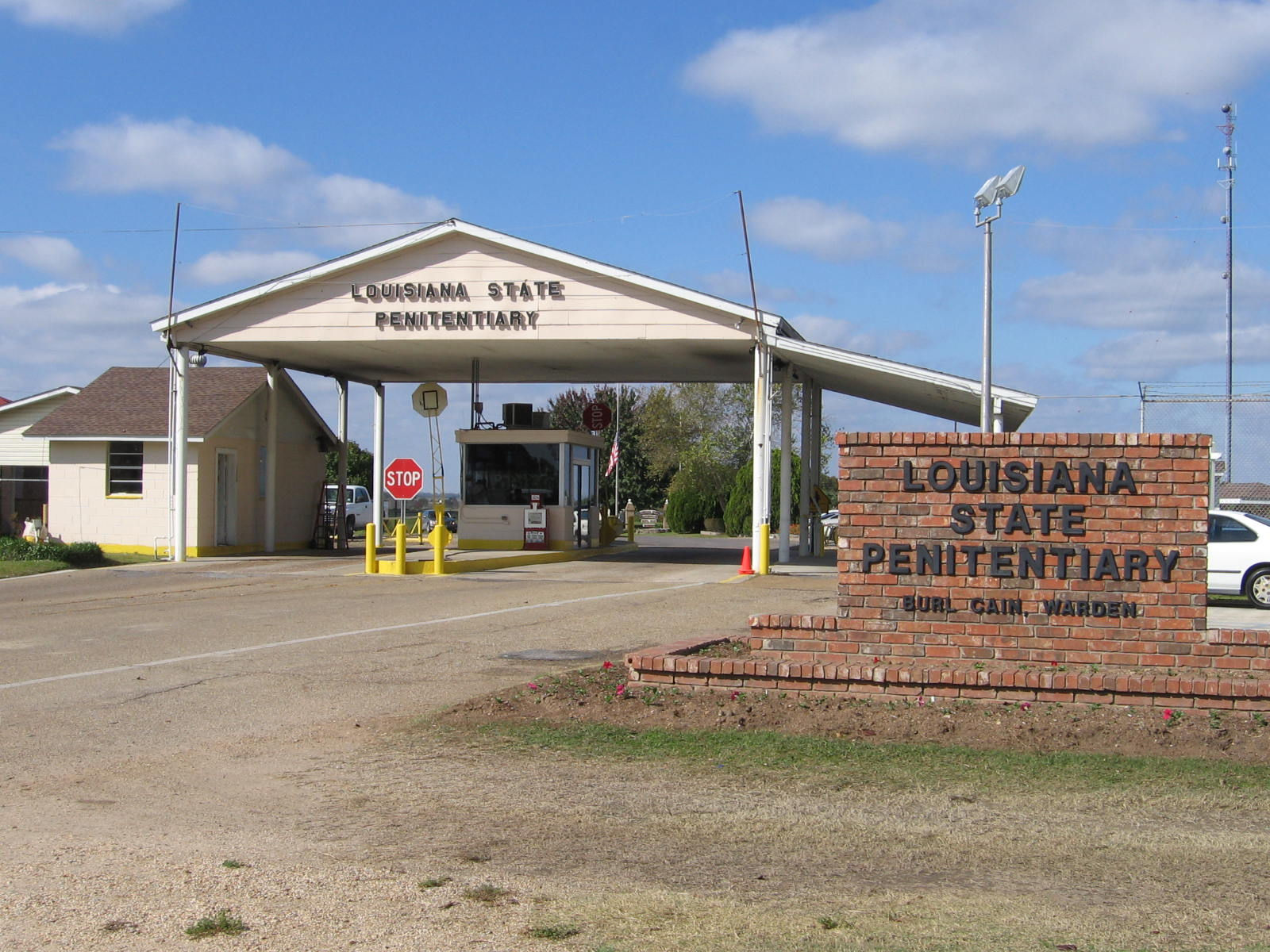
Louisiana State Penitentiary, where Tyler was held

Had Tyler been seventeen years old at the time of the shooting, he could have been charged in the district court with any felony, including second-degree murder, which would mean "the killing of a human being when the offender has the specific intent to kill or to inflict great bodily harm." As a sixteen-year-old juvenile, he would have had to be charged with second-degree murder in the juvenile court, where the maximum penalty to which he would be exposed would have been juvenile supervision until age twenty-one at a juvenile detention facility. Although the facts of the case made it difficult for the State to prove the mens rea necessary for a conviction of first-degree murder, which was "specific intent to kill or to inflict great bodily harm upon more than one person," Tyler was charged with first-degree murder, as the only way to impose a harsher penalty than juvenile detention was to charge him with a capital crime.

Tyler's trial in the 29th Judicial Court began with jury selection on November 5, 1975, with Judge Ruche Marino presiding. Security was intense in the small, second-floor courtroom, and Judge Marino said that some witnesses had reported being threatened.

After three days of jury selection, opening arguments were held on November 10. The prosecution sought to enter into evidence a pair of gloves which they alleged had been worn by Tyler on the day of the shooting, and contained traces of gunpowder. Tyler's attorney, Jack Williams, objected that the results of laboratory tests on the gloves had only been made available to him the week before, the day before the trial began. Furthermore, Williams said that he had been assured by the prosecution that the gloves would not be used in the trial. The prosecution said they had only told Williams the gloves would not be used so far as any lab tests were concerned—adding that that assurance was given before the tests were conducted.

Deputy Gary Zeringue testified that he had been given the gloves on the day of Tyler's arrest, without indicating where he got them. He said he kept them for about two months before handing them over to the Southeast Louisiana Crime Laboratory in Jefferson Parish on December 4, 1974, and did not receive the lab report until October 31, 1975. Assistant District Attorney Norman Pitre said Zeringue first notified him about the report on November 3. Calling the delay "terrible," Judge Marino said, "this epitomizes the situation in this parish. I think if we're going to develop a criminal case we should do it right." Marino excluded the gloves from evidence, saying, "if you don't like it you can go to the Supreme Court."

The trial was then halted as the prosecution made an interlocutory appeal to the Louisiana Supreme Court. The Louisiana Supreme Court held an emergency hearing on the evening of November 10 and reversed Marino's ruling the next day, specifying that Williams had the option of having independent tests performed on the gloves. Officers testified that they had taken the gloves from Tyler when he was arrested aboard the school bus. Herman L. Parrish, director of the Southeast Louisiana Criminalistics Laboratory, testified that he had had the gloves in a vault at the laboratory since December 4, but did not get around to testing them for powder flash until two weeks earlier. He also said that he had scraped off most of the gunpowder in making tests and doubted another scraping could be obtained; to Williams' question, "would it do me any good to have the gloves examined by someone else?", Parrish replied, "I question that it would." In light of this testimony, Williams said he would not have an independent test conducted.

On Wednesday, November 12, Maj. Charles Faucheaux of the St. Charles Sheriff's office testified that he was standing near the bus when he heard a shot; he saw a gloved hand holding a smoking pistol out the window of the bus, and then saw Weber fall to the ground. The bus driver, Ernest Cojoe, testified that as a 23-year veteran of the Army, he was familiar with firearms, and he did not believe the gunshot he had heard had come from a .45-caliber pistol fired inside the bus, as the report would have sounded louder. Cojoe then heard someone shout that a shot had been fired from the third seat from the rear of the bus, but he was unsure what had actually happened. Larry Dabney, 17, testified that he had been sitting next to Tyler in the third seat from the rear of the bus when he heard a popping noise, then turned and saw his friend holding a gun; the gun was then passed around a number of students and back to Tyler, who hid it in the stuffing of a bus seat. Sgt. Harvey Kimble told the court that Tyler was one of the passengers taken off the bus and searched after Cojoe drove it to a safe location; no weapon was found aboard the bus at that time, but Zeringue testified that after Cojoe drove the bus to New Sarpy, a more exhaustive search turned up a .45-caliber pistol concealed in a seat near the rear of the bus.

On Thursday, Natalie Marie Blanks, 16, testified that she was sitting next to Tyler and saw him hold the gun out the window and fire the shot; "I saw everything," she said. In hesitant, halting testimony, Blanks said that Tyler told her to get down, then rolled down the window and fired; afterward, he slashed the seat with a knife and hid the gun in the stuffing. Her testimony contradicted Dabney's, who had said that he and another student were sitting in the same seat as Tyler; on cross-examination, Blanks said of Dabney that "he is lying. He has to be." The prosecution rested its case after calling its 18th witness, Kenneth Gaillot, a firearms expert who testified that the bullet which killed Timothy Weber had come from the .45 hidden in the seat.

The defense called six witnesses, including Tyler himself; he spent 75 minutes on the witness stand. Tyler said that he had been suspended from school earlier that day, but returned by sheriff's deputies. He said he boarded the bus to take his little brother home safely. Williams asked him whether he saw the gun. "Well, something was passed to me, but I'm not sure," Tyler responded. "Gary, you would know whether a gun was passed to you, wouldn't you?", Williams asked. Tyler replied, "yeah." When Williams asked, "did you fire the gun?", Tyler replied, "no sir. I'm not a crazy person."

In closing arguments on Friday, November 14, Pitre said that Tyler "intended to kill as many people as possible" on the day of the shooting. L. J. Hymel of the state attorney general's office said the State had proven beyond a doubt that Tyler fired the gun out the window of the bus. Tyler had testified in a loud voice and with obvious indignation; Williams asked the jury to excuse what he called his client's "belligerence," which he said stemmed from the police brutality to which he had been subjected. Williams argued that the credibility of Blanks, the only witness who testified to having seen Tyler fire the gun, was doubtful, because her testimony that she was sitting next to Tyler was contradicted by all of the other witnesses, who said Tyler was sitting next to someone else. Williams argued, "I don't see how you can not have a reasonable doubt about where she sat. And if you have a reasonable doubt, you cannot believe her."

The prosecutor in his closing statement, and the judge in his charge to the jury, approved as relevant to the case the legal presumption "that the defendant intended the natural and probable consequence of his act." Williams made no objection to this statement by the prosecutor, or to Marino's charge to the jury. The all-white jury, composed of seven women and five men, found Tyler guilty after deliberating for two hours. Tyler stood quietly with hands folded as the verdict was read in the heavily guarded courtroom, showing no emotion.

Under Louisiana law, the penalty for first degree murder was a mandatory death sentence, to be accomplished by electrocution, which Judge Marino imposed at sentencing on November 18. Tyler said that the jury "didn't understand the laws." Asked outside of court whether the conviction and death sentence made him bitter, he said, "oh no, I feel like, my lawyer, he'll appeal and they're going to make things look right this time." Arguing that the prosecution had presented no evidence the gunpowder-stained gloves belonged to him, Tyler said, "my hope is high and I figure that I've got a good chance, and I want everybody else to know that too." Tyler was taken to Louisiana State Prison, where at age 17, he was the youngest inmate on death row.

== Appeals ==
=== Direct appeal ===
In March 1976, Natalie Blanks went to Tyler's mother and repudiated her testimony. She said that she had lied on the witness stand, that actually she had not seen anything happen on the bus, and that she had testified falsely because the prosecuting attorney had threatened to charge her with perjury and with being an accessory to murder if she did not. Mrs. Tyler and Miss Blanks went to Tyler's appellate counsel, Jack Peebles, and her statement was recorded in a sworn affidavit.

Blanks stated in the affidavit, "When I got over to court, they (the prosecutors) gave me a paper and told me that I had to read it. And I didn't say that, you know. Like, that wasn't my version. That was their version, what was on the paper. They wrote something down on the paper and they told me when I got on the stand to read it. You know, so I read it, and it wasn't the truth." Norman Pitre reacted with incredulity to Blanks' claim that she had read her testimony off a paper prepared by the prosecution, asking, "do you think any judge in the country would allow his court to be run like that?"

One of the other students who had testified that she had seen Tyler holding a gun in the bus, Loretta London Thomas, also executed an affidavit saying she had been coerced by police into signing a statement saying she had seen the gun on the bus when actually she had not seen it. Thomas said she had been questioned by the police on three occasions on the day of the shooting, and during the third interrogation, a sheriff's deputy told her he was "going to send her to jail for 99 days" if she didn't sign a statement saying that a gun had been passed around the bus. At this time, Peebles began to theorize that Weber was not shot from the bus at all and may have even been killed by someone in or behind the crowd who was shooting at the bus.

Peebles filed a motion for a new trial based on newly discovered evidence on March 10, 1976. After an extensive hearing, the district court denied the motion on April 28.

=== Federal appeals ===
In 1980 the United States Court of Appeals for the Fifth Circuit held that Tyler had been "convicted on an unconstitutional charge" (per the 1976 USSC Roberts decision) and that the trial was "fundamentally unfair". They noted that his attorney had failed to object to the judge making an improper charge to the jury, instructing them to "find that the defendant, Tyler, had intended 'the natural and probable consequences of his act', i.e. to kill or inflict great bodily harm on more than one person." The court vacated Tyler's conviction and remanded the case to the lower court, ordering a new trial. But the state appealed this decision based on his attorney's failure to object to the judge's instruction, which normally prevents redress of the conviction. In 1981 the Appeals Court reversed its earlier ruling. While reiterating its judgment that the trial had been unfair, it withdrew its instruction for another trial, because of his attorney's error. The US Supreme Court did not accept this case for hearing.

=== Changes in Eighth Amendment jurisprudence ===
In Roberts v. Louisiana (1976), the United States Supreme Court ruled that Louisiana's death penalty statute was unconstitutional as it made the death penalty mandatory for certain murders, and it did not allow for consideration of mitigating factors or the exercise of mercy to spare a defendant's life. The USSC directed the Louisiana Supreme court to review the cases of all inmates on death row and commute their sentences to life in prison without parole, the next lower level of punishment. As a result, the Louisiana Supreme Court sentenced Tyler to life imprisonment without parole for at least 20 years. He joined the general prison population at Angola to serve his sentence.

The US Supreme Court ruled in Miller v. Alabama (2012), that mandatory life sentences without parole for persons convicted as minors was unconstitutional for all juvenile offenders, even for persons convicted of murder. The court ruled that this decision had to be applied retroactively, potentially affecting nearly 3000 persons nationally who had been convicted as minors and received such sentences.

Tyler gained freedom following Louisiana Supreme Court review and consultation with the St. Charles Parish district attorney's office on his case. The DA and court agreed to vacate Tyler's conviction for first-degree murder if Tyler agreed to enter a guilty plea to manslaughter. The judge sentenced him to the maximum of 21 years for that charge. Since Tyler had already served 41 years, nearly twice that time, he was finally released from prison on April 29, 2016. Tyler told the Weber family at the hearing that he was "truly sorry for their loss and pain," saying, "I accept responsibility for my role in this."

== Public activism ==
In 1989, the Louisiana Board of Pardons recommended that Tyler's sentence be commuted to 60 years. However, Governor Buddy Roemer rejected the recommendation. Roemer was running for reelection against David Duke at the time. He refused to consider the pardon as the election was racially charged. He feared a backlash from white voters if he freed Tyler.

Human-rights organizations, including Amnesty International, have argued that the legal process and procedures were flawed by the racially charged atmosphere of the period and by police intimidation of Tyler and witnesses. Due to the racial and political issues when Tyler was convicted, in 1994 Amnesty International described him as a "political prisoner".

In 2007 Bob Herbert of The New York Times wrote three columns about the case and the injustice committed against Tyler. His work helped raise the visibility of Tyler's plight. Amnesty International, a coalition of sports figures, and other groups made a renewed effort to gain executive clemency for Tyler. In 2007 his attorneys filed a petition with the Louisiana Parole Board requesting that they commute his life sentence to a defined number of years, which was necessary by state law in order to gain approval by the governor for executive clemency. Tyler did not gain a pardon; he had by then served 32 years in prison.

Tyler's supporters have claimed that there was a miscarriage of justice in his case. Some of the issues include:

- The white community of Destrehan High School, like others in the Deep South, was vehemently against integration and was anti-black. The school board had reluctantly adopted busing to achieve integration of the school 20 years after the Supreme Court ruled that segregation of public schools was unconstitutional. On the day of the shooting, 100-200 white students had been involved in a violent protest against black students.
- The bus driver has insisted that he believes the shot was fired from outside of the bus.
- The bus driver observed the first search of the bus, and said that no gun was found on it.
- The gun which the police claim was used in the murder (and produced as evidence at the trial), was a Colt .45 government-issue. It was identified by officers of the parish sheriff's department as having been stolen from their firing range. The gun later disappeared from the sheriff's evidence room.
- Tyler's trial counsel, Jack Williams, "had never handled a murder case, much less a death penalty case. He kept his meetings with his client to a minimum and would later complain about the money he was paid."
- The jury for Tyler's trial was all white; black people had been excluded by the prosecution.
- The 1981 US Court of Appeals, Fifth Circuit, ruled that the trial was based on an unconstitutional charge as it required a mandatory sentence (given the USSC's decision in Roberts v. Louisiana (1976) and was "fundamentally unfair", flawed by the trial judge's improper charge to the jury that the jury must find that the defendant, Tyler, had "intended the natural and probable consequences of his act".
- A person standing next to Timothy Weber suffered a minor injury when Weber was killed. The prosecution claimed that Tyler had acted "with a specific intent to kill or to inflict great bodily harm on more than one person" in order to convict him of the capital charge of first-degree murder.
- Four major witnesses against Tyler have recanted their testimony since the trial, claiming they were terrorized and pressured by police. For example, Larry Dabney, the key witness in the case against Tyler, was a student sitting beside Tyler on the school bus when the shooting occurred. He described his experience with officers at the all-white police department:
  They didn’t even ask me what I saw, they told me flat out that I was going to be their key witness. They told me I was going to testify that I saw Gary with a gun right after I heard the shot and that a few minutes later I had seen him hide it in a slit in the seat. That was not true. I didn’t see Gary or anybody else in that bus with a gun.
  Such statements are typical of the other witnesses used to convict the young Tyler.

== Popular culture ==
- Gil Scott-Heron sang about Tyler in the song "Angola, Louisiana," on the 1978 album Secrets.
- British reggae band UB40 opened their 1980 debut album, Signing Off with the song "Tyler". The song name-checks the subject only as "Tyler" but they have often given Tyler's full name when introducing the song live. The band revisited the subject on the song "Rainbow Nation" on their 2008 album TwentyFourSeven.
- The British band Chumbawamba included the song "Waiting for the Bus" on their 2008 album The Boy Bands Have Won. The song tells the story from the imagined view of Tyler.

== Quilting ==
Gary Tyler is a fiber artist. He became a hospice volunteer at Angola Prison, by quilting as a way to raise money for the prison's hospice program, drawing inspiration from the sewing traditions of his mother and grandmother.

Tyler uses his quilts and his 2025 memoir, Stitching Freedom, to speak for himself and ensure his story is never forgotten.
