= 1980 (album) =

Studio album by Gil Scott-Heron and Brian Jackson
- Released: February 1980
- Recorded: August–October 1979
- Genres: Jazz-funk; electronic; disco; dance
- Length: 35:57
- Label: Arista
- Producers: Malcolm Cecil; Brian Jackson; Gil Scott-Heron

Gil Scott-Heron chronology
Secrets (1978)	1980 (1980)	Real Eyes (1980)

Singles from 1980
- 1. "Shut 'Um Down" Released: March 1980; 2. "Willing" Released: May 1980

1980 is a studio album by American singer-songwriter Gil Scott-Heron and keyboardist Brian Jackson. Their ninth album together, it was recorded from August to October 1979 during a period of creative tension between the two musicians and released in February 1980 by Arista Records.

Scott-Heron and Jackson produced 1980 with Malcolm Cecil and performed with a host of studio musicians, including drummer Harvey Mason, guitarist Marlo Henderson, and trombonist Bill Watrous. They incorporated sounds from contemporary pop music, such as disco, dance, and new wave, into their established jazz-funk style. Jackson arranged the songs and played a number of instruments, including Cecil's TONTO synthesizer, which was featured in the album's cover photo. Scott-Heron's lyrics explore contemporary concerns in US society, such as nuclear power and racism, as well as pressures in life and fear of the future. Several songs address the idealism held among African Americans amid the declining Black Power movement.

The album charted at number 82 on the Billboard Top LPs & Tape chart while also impacting the R&B and jazz charts. A critical success, it received praise for its musical qualities and Scott-Heron's subject matter. 1980 proved to be Scott-Heron and Jackson's last album together.

== Background ==
In the 1970s, Gil Scott-Heron established himself as a prominent vocalist, spoken-word poet, and songwriter in African-American music. Debuting with the spoken-word recording Small Talk at 125th and Lenox (1970), he wrote poignant commentaries on contemporary social issues affecting black people at the turn of the decade, such as racial inequality. He began setting his lyrics to music composed and recorded with keyboardist Brian Jackson on studio albums such as Pieces of a Man (1971) and Winter in America (1974), among the nine albums the two would record together, eventually with a backing ensemble called the Midnight Band. Scott-Heron's performance of spoken-word vocals over funk rhythms helped pioneer hip hop music, which was emerging in the mainstream by the latter half of the decade.

By the late 1970s, however, the duo's creative relationship was deteriorating as Scott-Heron increasingly encroached on Jackson's musical direction of the Midnight Band and dominated their songwriting contributions, eventually relegating Jackson to arrangement and performance roles. While critically successful, their albums had sold modestly amidst a growingly apathetic political climate in the US, leading Clive Davis (the head of their Arista record label) to enlist Malcolm Cecil for 1978's Secrets, which further strained the duo's partnership. A renowned and eccentric producer with credits on 1970s albums by Stevie Wonder, Billy Preston, and Weather Report, Cecil had developed the TONTO studio system featuring a wall-to-wall set-up of both vintage and custom modular synthesizers. His new electronic direction for the Midnight Band excited Jackson, who saw it as an opportunity to experiment with different elements and jazz improvisation, to the discontent of the more blues- and acoustic-minded Scott-Heron. While Jackson found his creative partner too insecure as a musician to leave his comfort zone, Scott-Heron accused him of exploiting the situation to advance his own career, portending further arguments on a tense concert tour promoting Secrets.

Amidst the duo's creative differences and Arista's growing impatience for a hit song, Scott-Heron found emotional support and escape in his relationship with the actress Brenda Sykes, whom he married in December 1978 and shared homes with on both the East and West Coasts. While largely focused and energetic for shows when close to her, Scott-Heron spent most of their marriage away on tour and often resorted to alcohol and drug abuse. As his drug use escalated toward the end of the Secrets tour, the Midnight Band began to break up with concerns over pay and the duo's growing tension.

== Recording and production ==
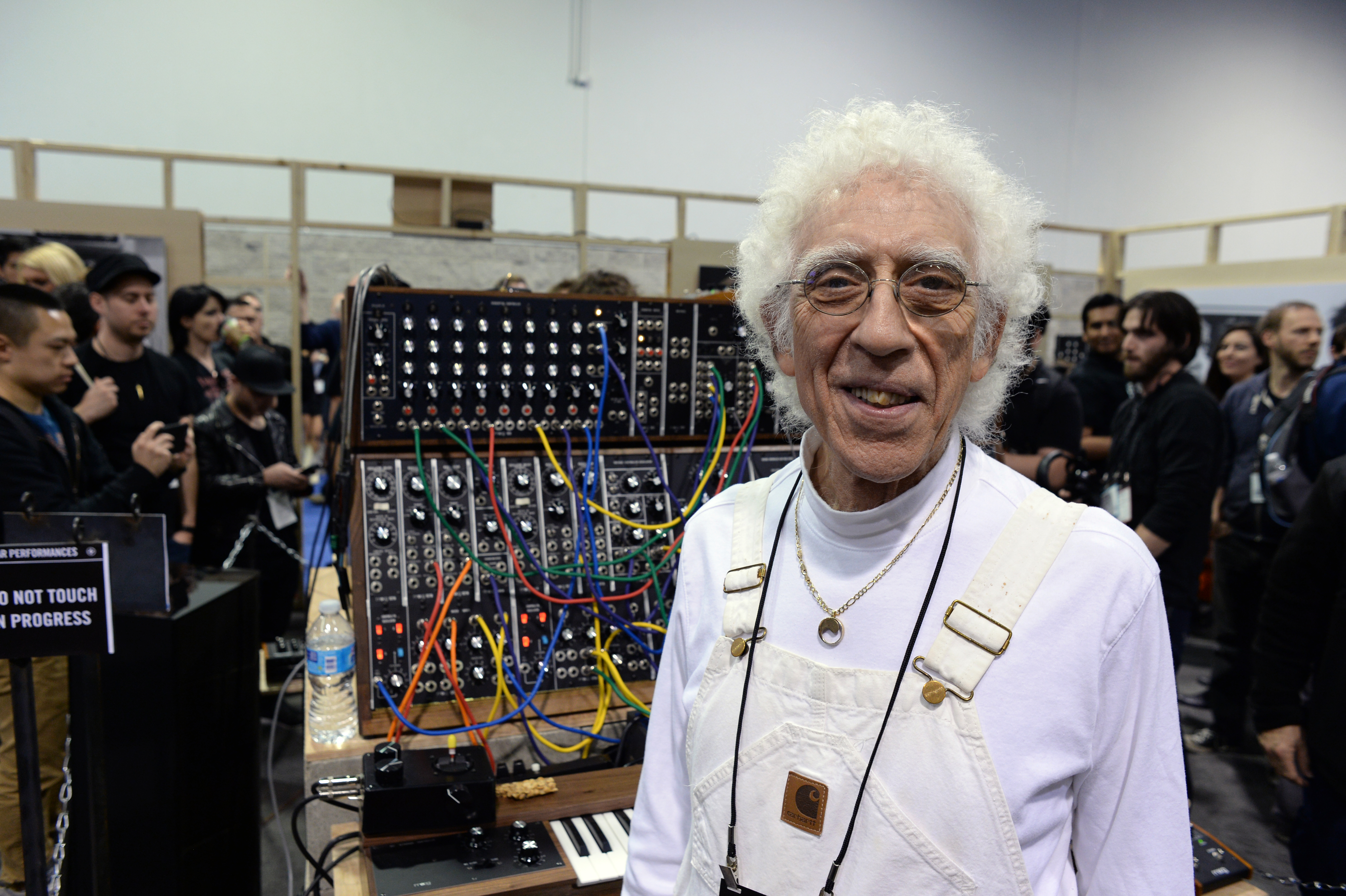
Malcolm Cecil with the TONTO synthesizer in 2015

Scott-Heron and Jackson recorded 1980 from August to October 1979. Scott-Heron composed most of the songs, while Jackson arranged them all. Both musicians produced the album, alongside co-producer Malcolm Cecil. They were accompanied by a team of musicians that included drummer Harvey Mason, guitarist Marlo Henderson, and trombonist Bill Watrous.

With 1980, Scott-Heron embraced electronic sounds popularized in contemporary music styles like R&B and hip hop. According to The Quietus journalist Tristan Bath, as with Secrets, 1980 departed from the jazz chords, faint keyboards, and Afrocentric themes of Scott-Heron and Jackson's previous recordings together in favor of "disco and futurist dance music tropes". Both records, Pitchfork's Nate Patrin says, found the musicians adopting contemporary music's "synthesized, dancefloor-driven" trends and "funky, disco-beat" settings for their "pop-friendly protest songs". In the opinion of Exclaim!'s David Dacks, this resulted in "a more overtly synthetic sound" for Scott-Heron, who tried to "incorporate changing musical trends into his earthy jazz-funk".

"Corners"
A sample of the song, featuring retro funk riffs with synthesizer sounds from contemporary new wave music

Scott-Heron sang forcefully and emotionally over a relaxed beat on the title track, over jazz-influenced rhythms and smooth guitar playing on "Push Comes to Shove", and over a production on "Shah MOT (The Shah Is Dead/Checkmate)" that melds African- and funk-rooted rhythms with synthesizer sounds. On "Corners", the wah-wah guitar and heavy bass riffs from 1970s funk are fused with the "spacey" synthesizers that would characterize 1980s new wave music. "Shah MOT (The Shah Is Dead/Checkmate)" and "Late Last Night" were recorded with Jackson playing the TONTO synthesizer, which produced warm timbres and sub-bass tones. "Corners" was the last song Scott-Heron composed with Jackson.

== Lyrics and themes ==
To those of us living in 1979, it felt like 1980 was the twenty-first century. With 1984, the Orwellian doomsdate, right around the corner, we were concerned… Even though the Vietnam War was years away, many of us still saw a glimmer of hope in the seventies. But now there really wasn't, as Gil laments in the song '1980,' 'Even no way back to '75, much less 1969.'

— Brian Jackson's liner notes to the album

1980 continues in the socially-conscious thematic vein of Scott-Heron's previous albums, addressing prominent concerns of its era such as nuclear power and big business ("Shut 'Um Down"), racism ("Willing"), and governmental oppression ("Shah MOT"). "Shut 'Um Down" features an anti-nuclear message, while "Alien (Hold On to Your Dreams)" promotes the plight of illegal Mexican immigrants in California. The title track voices feelings of alienation and disillusionment with the future alongside reflections on the past. According to AllMusic's Jeff Schwachter, "Scott-Heron's focus at the close of the decade is strikingly similar to his focus on his 1970 debut, Small Talk at 125th and Lennox; namely that social and political change has yet to come to many Americans, despite the advancements in technology and other seemingly less significant realms."

Scott-Heron's lyrics also explore the ideals held among African Americans in the wake of the Black Power movement's decline. "1980" presents "the sound of a Black man who's striving in a creative way to keep the Black movement alive", according to Umoja Sasa of US Black Engineer & IT magazine, who cites the song's refrain: "It's 1980, and there ain't no way back to '75 much less 1969 / It's 1980 and ain't nobody asked me no time lately how we gonna open the door for 1984." The song also references the exploitation and eventual discarding of African-American cultural innovations ("Boogie-Woogie's somewhere in the lost and found"). In "Shah MOT (The Shah Is Dead/Checkmate)", the African-American social movement is related to the concerns of the 1979 Iranian Revolution, which overthrew the Shah Mohammad Reza Pahlavi. "My name is what's your name / Our's is a single aim and we can double recognize the need form; Take it to the streets! Tell everybody you meet! Do whatever you do whenever you hear the war drums beat! Put it in the air! Spread it everywhere! Do whatever you do whenever you know you've got to be there", Scott-Heron sings, before asking in the song, "Shah Mot! Look closely, who does it resemble?"

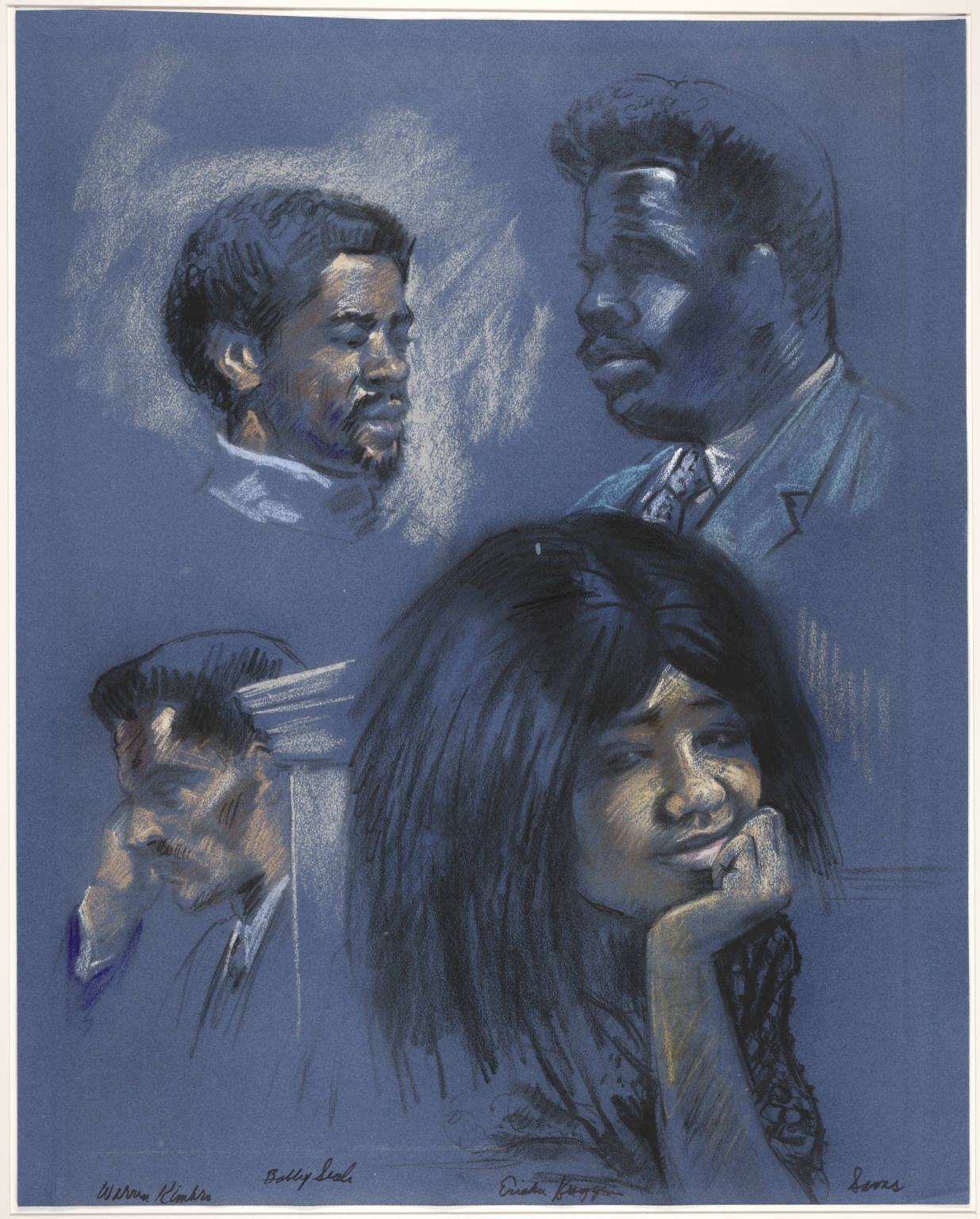
A courtroom sketch by Robert Templeton of defendants in the New Haven Black Panther trials, 1971. The decline of the Black Power movement serves as a subtext to songs such as "1980" and "Push Comes to Shove".

Further concerns of black social-consciousness are explored in "Push Comes to Shove", which touches on how African Americans by 1980 had been affected by the deaths or imprisonments of prominent black leaders from the 1960s. Thematizing the need for compromise in life, Scott-Heron relates this to the successful transition by some blacks into mainstream American life.

Nobody should ride you about the commitment you had.
'Cause they done learned you and they done burned you;
showed you idealistic is all you wuz;
everybody gotta realize that we all had to compromise;
had to put on suits and ties when push came to shove.
Push comes to shove once in your lifetime.
Push comes to shove to find out just what's on your mind.
Push comes to shove to find exactly what you're made of.

— Scott-Heron, "Push Comes to Shove", 1980

Both "Push Comes to Shove" and "Willing" express Scott-Heron's philosophy to pressures in life. The album's final track "Late Last Night" was inspired by his touring life and the process of writing music, featuring an account of waking up in a hotel room with an idea for a song but being unable to find a paper or instrument to compose. The narrative finds him fighting with staff to use the hotel's lounge piano and, in the distraction, losing memory of the song's melody and lyrics.

Scott-Heron's lyrics throughout the album are described by Alex Suskind in Wax Poetics as "fearful of what the future holds, but conscious of the effort we as individuals need to make in order to keep society functioning for all." On "Corners", Scott-Heron "signals an impending sense of doom for the upcoming decade", according to Suskind, who cites the lyrics: "The turning of the decade like a marker hung in space / is a man-made definition like the bending of a page". Robert Christgau summarizes 1980's subjects as "compromise (necessary), 'surviving' (cop-out), aliens (surviving), the shah (dead), the road (long), and the future (here)."

== Cover photo ==
For the album's front cover, Scott-Heron and Jackson were photographed sitting alongside each other and in front of the TONTO synthesizer. Commenting on the photo in retrospect, Mark Sinker from The Wire said the two musicians appeared "foolish" wearing "Star Trek boots and Gary Numan overalls, posing in front of banks of computer technology". But he extended his interpretation of the photo to the creative "rut" Scott-Heron and Jackson might have been in during this period: "Their worship at the shrine of the small, warm and private, and a unified acoustic space in real time, has worked for them; but it must have begun to seem retro – they want to move on."

== Reception and legacy ==
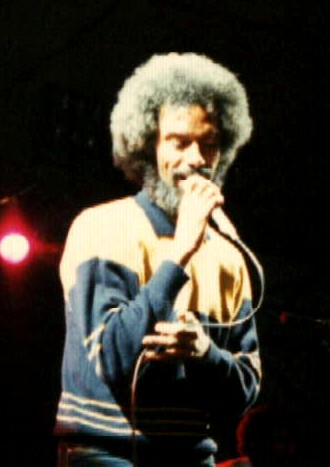
Scott-Heron in the 1980s

1980 was released on LP by Arista Records in February 1980. "Shut 'Um Down" and "Willing" were released as singles in March and May, respectively. The former single reached the number 68 position on the R&B singles chart.

Reviewing the album in March 1980 for The Village Voice, Christgau named it his "pick hit" for the month and the best record yet from Scott-Heron and Jackson. He applauded the lyrics and said, while "the melodies are only functional", "the rhythms are seductive and the singing is warm." Geoff Brown from Black Music & Jazz Review said Scott-Heron's songs were one of the few remedies for alleviating the "creeping suspicion which must afflict us all from time to time", as well as the idea "that black artists can only write convincingly these days about the topics of love and dancing." At the end of 1980, Christgau ranked it as the 32nd best record of the year in a list accompanying the annual Pazz & Jop critics poll.

Professional ratings
Review scores
Source	Rating
AllMusic	4/5 stars
Black Music & Jazz Review	4/5 stars
The Great Rock Discography	6/10
The New Rolling Stone Record Guide	3/5 stars
The Village Voice	A−
DownBeat	5/5 stars

The album proved to be Scott-Heron and Jackson's last together, as Jackson left the partnership that year to pursue other musical projects in New Jersey. Scott-Heron's subsequent recordings expanded on 1980's political commentary, which would progress to harsh attacks on Ronald Reagan's presidency during the 1980s. As the US "advanced into a new and uncertain decade", the album's abundance of observations proved "perceptive and poignant", according to Schwachter. In his opinion, the production retained past musical styles amidst exceptional arrangements of synthesizers, horns, and background vocals, all of which gave the record "a quality that matched the aura of the period", especially on "Alien (Hold On to Your Dreams)".

1980 was reissued in CD format by Soul Brother Records on November 17, 2009. On April 26, 2011, in commemoration of the Chernobyl disaster's 25th anniversary, The Nation published a list of the ten best anti-nuclear songs, ranking "Shut 'Um Down" at number one.

== Track listing ==
All songs were written and composed by Gil Scott-Heron, except where noted.

Side one

1. "Shut 'Um Down" – 5:28
2. "Alien (Hold On to Your Dreams)" – 4:09
3. "Willing" – 4:16
4. "Corners" (lyrics by Scott-Heron; music by Brian Jackson) – 4:47

Side two

1. "1980" – 6:20
2. "Push Comes to Shove" – 3:37
3. "Shah MOT (The Shah Is Dead/Checkmate)" – 4:04
4. "Late Last Night" – 4:25
- Sides one and two were combined as tracks 1–8 on the CD reissue.

== Personnel ==
Credits are adapted from the album's liner notes.

- Ed Brady – guitar (side two: tracks 1 and 2)
- Malcolm Cecil – engineering, mixing, production, production assistance
- Carl Cornwell – flute, saxophone (side two: tracks 1 and 2)
- Donn Davenport – art direction
- John Ford – cover photo
- Gordon Goodwin – horns
- Marlo Henderson – guitar (side one: tracks 1, 2, 4; side two: track 4)
- Brian Jackson – acoustic piano, arrangements, backing vocals (side one: track 1), drums (side one: track 1), electric piano, kettle drums (side two: track 3), keyboard bass, production, synthesizer, TONTO synthesizer (side two: track 3)
- Ron Kellum – art direction
- Harvey Mason – drums (side one: tracks 2 to 4; side two: tracks 1 to 4)
- Marti McCall – backing vocals
- Gil Scott-Heron – production, vocals
- Denis Sirias – horns
- Julia Waters – backing vocals
- Maxine Waters Waddell – backing vocals
- Bill Watrous – horns

== Charts ==
Chart (1980)	Peak position
U.S. Billboard Top LPs & Tape	82
U.S. Top R&B Albums (Billboard)	22
U.S. Top Jazz Albums (Billboard)	7

== See also ==
- Post–civil rights era in African-American history
- Progressive soul
