= Moving Target (Gil Scott-Heron album) =

Studio album by Gil Scott-Heron
- Released: September 1982
- Recorded: March–June 1982
- Length: 37:33
- Label: Arista
- Producer: Malcolm Cecil, Gil Scott-Heron

Gil Scott-Heron chronology
Reflections (1981)	Moving Target (1982)	Spirits (1994)

Professional ratings
Review scores
Source	Rating
Sounds	4/5 stars

Moving Target is a studio album by American spoken-word poet and blues musician Gil Scott-Heron.

== Background, production, release ==
The album, released on Arista in 1982, was to be his last for more than a decade. On Moving Target, Scott-Heron and his band "The Amnesia Express" recorded their "typical, tastefully jazzy R&B and funk grooves", though flavored with "more exotic sounds" and influenced by reggae (there are echoes of Bob Marley in some songs). The final song, the almost ten-minute long "Black History/The World", is in part a spoken-word performance by Scott-Heron ending with a "plea for peace and world change".

The album, co-produced by Malcolm Cecil, was released in September 1982 on LP (#204921), and issued as a CD in February 1997, under the same number. Robert Christgau gave the album a B.

== Track listing ==
All tracks composed by Gil Scott-Heron; except where indicated

1. "Fast Lane" (lyrics: Scott-Heron; music: Robbie Gordon) – 4:55
2. "Washington D.C." – 4:13
3. "No Exit" – 4:08
4. "Blue Collar" – 5:18
5. "Explanations" – 4:12
6. "Ready or Not" (lyrics: Scott-Heron; music: Larry McDonald) – 4:33
7. "Black History/The World" – 9:42

== Personnel ==
- Gil Scott-Heron – vocals; electric piano on "Washington D.C."
- Vernon James – alto saxophone; flute on "Ready or Not"
- Robbie Gordon – bass
- Kenny Powell – drums
- Ed Brady – guitar
- Glen Turner – keyboards
- Carl Cornwell – tenor saxophone (tracks 2, 3, 7)
- Ron Holloway – tenor saxophone
- Kenny Sheffield – trumpet
- Larry McDonald – percussion
- "High Note" Harry Kim – trumpet on "Washington D.C."
- Malcolm Cecil – horn arrangement on "Fast Lane"

Technical personnel

- Malcolm Cecil - engineer, co-producer
- Alan Douglas - second engineer
- Richard Mannering - second engineer
- Denis Heron - coordinator, production assistant
- Bob Carboni - mastering
- Donn Davenport - artwork
- John Ford - photography
- Recorded at Bias Studio, Springfield, Virginia (March 25–27 and May 28–29, 1982); Townhouse Studios, London (April 9–12, 1982); The Manor Studio, Oxford (April 19–21, 1982); and Record Plant, Los Angeles (June 7–17, 1982). Mixed at Record Plant. Mastered at A&M Studios, Los Angeles (July 1982).
