= Isotope (band) =

British 1970s jazz rock band

Isotope was a British jazz rock band, fronted by the guitarist Gary Boyle.

Boyle founded the band in June 1972 and a first album, Isotope, was largely composed by their keyboardist Brian Miller. Jeff Clyne played bass and Nigel Morris played drums. Clyne and Miller left in 1974, however, and were replaced by Hugh Hopper and Laurence Scott (born 7 February 1946) respectively. After touring, this new line-up recorded the band's second album, Illusion. In late 1974, the band appeared on film on BBC 2's The Old Grey Whistle Test, playing "Spanish Sun" from the album.

Further touring followed and there were various personnel changes. Deep End was recorded in 1975 with two keyboardists; Zoe Kronberger and Frank Roberts. Hopper played on one track, but the bass was otherwise played by Dan K. Brown. Morris Pert also played percussion.

Boyle subsequently focused on a solo career.

The band also appeared on a 2004 nine-track, 48-minute compilation CD Live at the BBC, issued by Eclectic Records / Hux Records, presenting material from three BBC sessions.

== Discography ==
- Isotope (Gull, 11 April 1974)
- Illusion (Gull, 1974)
- Deep End (Gull, 1975)
- Live at the BBC (Hux, 2004)
- Golden Section (Cuneiform, 2008)
