= St George's Canzona =

British musical ensemble

St. George's Canzona is a British musical ensemble.

== Early years: Musica Reservata and the Harlow Ensemble ==
In Britain at least, it may be said that the early-music movement was initiated by Arnold Dolmetsch (b. 1858) and his family who (it seems) are all but forgotten today, even though their influence lingered on until the 1960s. Following the Dolmetschs came a second wave, in which Michael Morrow's group, Musica Reservata (see Thomson, J. M.; Sothcott, John; Fallows, David; Page, Christopher (August 1994). "Michael Morrow Obituory". Early Music. 22 (3): 537–539. doi:10.1093/earlyj/xxii.3.537. JSTOR 3128106.) was the foremost influence, and of which John Sothcott was a highly accomplished recorder player and founder member. Initially, Morrow's field of activity was medieval music, and possibly the first occasion upon which they came into prominence was whilst touring in Brian Trowell's production of The Raising of Lazarus, a medieval miracle play (1962). Leading the procession of disciples, they leapt straight out of a Bruegel painting; the three virtuoso minstrels - Michael Morrow, John Beckett and John Sothcott - followed by the impressive figure of Jeremy Montague, who beat an all-pervasive staccato accompaniment on the nakers (a small pair of drums hung at the waist). Thus they demonstrated exactly how such music might be lifted from the ancient manuscript, and be made to live and breathe again.

But in spite of such success, Michael began to harbour doubts regarding his tough approach to the performance of Medieval music. In his search for authenticity therefore, a change of direction became imperative, so that he now steered his vessel into the better charted waters of the Renaissance. His first venture into this period was a highly ambitious one, namely the Florentine Intermedii, which served as light musical interludes between the extravagantly staged acts of some 16th. century plays. These were scored in the multi-layered polychoral manner, and therefore required the participation of perhaps forty artists. Consequently, the assembled company came to include young performers who would constitute the next prominent generation of early musicians, including Phil Pickett and the ill-fated David Munrow. But also amongst those who would subsequently strike out on their own was John Sothcott himself who - living in Essex - had formed the Harlow Canzona Ensemble. Made up of local enthusiasts, it was originally simply a recorder consort, but soon acquired a veritable arsenal of other period instruments, regarding which Mike Oxenham's impressive array of autophones deserves a special mention. Consequently, this group was called upon to participate in the forthcoming concert and its attendant recording for Decca.

== The beginnings of St George's Canzona ==
Amongst those who attended that night at the Royal Festival Hall was an actor - George Murcell - whose ambition it was to convert a disused Victorian church (St. George's Church, Tufnell Park, London) into a Shakespearean theatre-in-the-round, like the original Globe Theatre. This was a project which needed funds, a contribution to which was to come from the sales of a record featuring various extracts from the works of the Bard. For this George had already recruited a formidable array of talent - actors such as Paul Scofield, Dorothy Tutin and Christopher Plummer, the last being hot from his success in the film, The Sound of Music; and it was this last element that George needed to leaven his loaf! Musica Reservata (he thought) would fill the bill admirably. But Michael Morrow - for reasons of his own - would have none of it. So Frank Grubb - a member of the Sothcott group - promised George Murcell that - in the event of Michael's continuing intransigence - the Canzona Ensemble would step into the breach. An so it transpired that Frank - being already Musica Reservata's recording agent - would form a partnership with John Sothcott for the purpose of making records which would operate amicably during the creation of a dozen future albums. Subsequently, changing its name to suit that of the budding theatre, the St. George's Canzona now turned professional by virtue of being featured on Decca's ARGO label.

At the time, Frank Grubb was also contracted to PYE Records, for whom he was setting up albums of Early Music with other artists, as a consequence of which he was able to secure the services of PYE's celebrated recording engineer, Bob Auger, solely on the promise of royalties from this unknown group. In the event, Bob made two recordings for the Canzona, namely The Music of Henry VIII and To Drive the Cold Winter Away (the latter 1975), in respect of which, and to his amazement, royalties actually began to plop onto his doormat.

== Stringed instruments ==
Meanwhile, John Sothcott began to make his own stringed instruments, initially rebecs (for which the only exemplars were Medieval illustrations) but shortly afterwards he turned his attention to the vielle. For this the evidence was slender indeed; but of it, the Medieval theorist Grocheo had observed that this instrument included within itself all other instruments. Such words eventually convinced John that the vielle was an early form of fiddle whose bowed strings were concordantly tuned (e.g., G D g d), but to which was added a fifth drone string, so affixed to the peg box that it might be plucked rhythmically with the thumb of the left hand. By this means, the performer became a kind of one man band. John then proceeded to claim this instrument for his very own, so that - whilst others have since attempted to simulate its sound by other means - nobody else has actually mastered the vielle itself.

== St George's Canzona recordings ==
At about this time (1970), another recording engineer - John Boyden - had been signed up by EMI to their ‘Classics for Pleasure’ label. A Canzona release on this label would clearly be a step forward, but a ‘demo’ disc was needed. This was compiled from tracks made for the Elizabethan Appeal album, and achieved with the help of one of the Skeapings (who appropriately lived in a house named ‘Findings’!) and who possessed the necessary technical know-how and equipment. Received by John Boyden with the suggestion that his brand would benefit from an injection of medieval music, the outcome was a Christmas album entitled A Tapestry of Early Christmas Carols. For this, the choir was made up from the ‘orchestra wives’, whilst young up-and-coming soloists such as Philip Langridge (who died in 2010), Mike Rippon and David Thomas (but to whose distinguished company the Canzona's own counter-tenor, Derek Harrison, needed to yield nothing!) were engaged to spice up the credits. It was a great success, and demand necessitated a second pressing before the end of the festive season. A follow-up was required whose title track was England be Glad, and which featured music from the period of the Hundred Years War. It did not, however, enjoy the success of the previous record, partly (it would seem) on account of a less striking cover illustration by means of which to attract buyers.

== Spin-off projects ==
A further spin-off from the album for St. George's was the Canzona's folk-rock record, ‘Giles Farnaby's Dreame Band’. This was the brainchild of A & R man Kevin Daly who also worked for the ARGO label, but on the folk side of the house. His idea was to combine the Canzona with a group of folk singers (The Druids), bass guitar and drums, and for good measure an unconventional and musically illiterate folk group called ‘The Broken Consort’. These hailed from the West Country, and their principal, Trevor Crozier, actually signed on at a London Job Centre as a shepherd! How exactly this programme of folk songs and tunes from Playford's ‘English Dancing Master’ was to be made was indeed perplexing; but the ever-resourceful John Sothcott solved the problem by handing out four-part settings of the music, to which the Broken Consort simply busked along. As for bass and drums, these were added ‘ad hoc’ during this early eight track recording. The outcome was a foot-tapping, infectiously rhythmic rendering of England's best loved and most popular 17th. century songs and dances.

== The Tapestry recordings ==
However, satisfying as it most certainly was, to have made the foregoing albums, the Canzona's dream was to secure a contract guaranteeing a whole series of recordings. This, when it materialised, came quite unexpectedly; for by the mid-seventies, John Boyden had taken off from EMI to found his own classical label, Enigma. He needed from us (it transpired) a series of half-a-dozen albums, each with a specific historical theme. For these, John now re-used that Tapestry concept; and in the event, Tapestries were to be made for Robin Hood and his Merry Men, Christopher Columbus and his Crew, Good King Wenceslas and his Page, The Black Prince and his Knights, and for good measure, a double Civil War Album for Cromwell and his Roundheads, and for ‘King Charles and his Cavaliers’. (Recording for this series commenced in 1976, and the project was completed in three years.)

The first two Tapestries went well enough, although perhaps the resultant albums were not quite of top drawer quality; but by now the Canzona was getting fully into its stride, going on to create four further albums of a standard seldom surpassed in the world of Early Music. So far as John Sothcott was concerned, the Wenceslas album was something of a gift, for whereas Michael Morrow had felt unsure of his approach to Medieval music, John had always been certain that the clues to its authentic performance had been preserved down the ages by folk musicians, particularly those from Eastern Europe, which (of course) was Wenceslas territory. And so research for this record included the assembling of a suite of such music, this eventually serving as an exciting, up beat conclusion to the album, to which Ray Attfield's distinctive, ‘folksy’ voice made an indispensable contribution. But in spite of John Sothcott's preference for the robust kind of delivery which had originally characterised Musica Reservata's performances, music for the Black Prince Tapestry dictated that it should be performed with a lighter touch. After all, much of it dated from the period when the fashion was for intricate carving and flamboyant window tracery. It was, in fact, Gothic music; and therefore many of its tracks sparkle like cobwebs glistening with the morning dew.

Now, some time ago, Frank Grubb's son John had made his debut appearance with the Canzona at the youthful age of sixteen, during the making of the folk-rock disc. Currently of more mature years, he was about to join his father and John Sothcott in their search for suitable recording material. In fact, from about this time, the Canzona became increasingly involved in the production of its own albums, John Sothcott and Frank Grubb editing them jointly, following which Frank would sequence the master tapes and compile suitable sleeve notes. But having committed to those tapes the Medieval music which John Boyden rightly regarded as the Canzona's forte, the group had reached that apparently insuperable hiatus, the Civil War. Indeed, the initial session went so badly that Boyden expressed his doubts as to whether the Canzona was, after all, up to the task. They were out of their depth, the music being from a period for which they were totally unsuited and ill-equipped.

Desperately in need of inspiration, John Sothcott and Frank Grubb took themselves off to the site of the Battle of Edge Hill, hoping perhaps that the ghosts of those who had died there in 1642 would help them. There, at the - summit of the hill, there now stood -appositely - a mock castle, built in the 18th. century by the Gothic Revivalist Sanderson Miller (and now an inn), whereas at the foot nestled the village of Radway, (with which John had family connections) and where - on that freezing autumn night, lives of the wounded had been saved (it is said) by the sharp frost which staunched their wounds. This had been the first pitched battle of the war, and it left its mark on those who witnessed it, so that the Royal Commission of 1643 reported that in this place ‘are heard and seen fearful and strange apparitions of spirits, and sounds heard of drums and trumpets, with the discharging of canons and muskets, to the terror and amazement of the beholders’. In humble and reflective mood, John and Frank went their separate ways to dream up a fresh and viable approach to the task ahead of them.

Well (it was decided), if the Canzona was not constituted to perform the Art music of the period, it could most certainly cope with the more popular material. It was therefore Playford again who came to the rescue, lyrics for whose tunes were to be found in the Thomason Tracts - a collection of literally thousands of Civil War pamphlets and broadsheets (the Holy Grail for students of the subject) currently held in the British Library. To these sources were added the martial tunes of the time (notably Prince Rupert's March), and popular songs, of which When the King enjoys his own again, was thought by many to have contributed in no small measure to the Restoration of the monarchy. Finally, organ and harpsichord music was added to the mix by a new recruit, Mike Frith. Thereby having dispelled all his doubts, the triumphant Canzona now left John Boyden positively purring like a contented cat!

However, the initial release of these last four ‘Tapestries’ by Enigma was not the last that would be seen of them. During their making, WEA - who wished to acquire a classical label - purchased Enigma but soon tired of it, selling its tapes on to Academy Sound and Vision, of which (incidentally) Kevin Daly was a founder board member. They then re-released the Civil War albums on vinyl, but afterwards were persuaded to condense the last four ‘Tapestries’, as compilations, onto two CDs, namely ‘A Medieval Banquet’ and ‘Music for Roundheads and Cavaliers’ (1994). (The greater capacity of the CD over the LP meant that little was sacrificed.) After this, it seems that the masters went to Sanctuary Records, but then disappeared from sight. Whether and where they will ever surface again remains to be seen.

== Later developments ==
But to return to the 1980s, Frank Grubb now retired in favour of his son John, who secured two further recording contracts from CRD, again engineered by Bob Auger. These were ‘Merry it is while Summer Lasts’ (to complement the ‘Winter’ album which CRD had previously released) and ‘Medieval Songs and Dances’ (1983/84). These also were CDs, and they at least equalled in stature the many other albums of Early Music which were currently flooding onto the market. Again, at about this time, John Grubb formed his own group, ‘The Noise of Minstrels’ - an eventuality which the other John had long since foretold. Like the Canzona, these also leaned somewhat towards folk music, playing drone-based instruments, such as the hurdy-gurdy and the bagpipes; and Bob Auger's goodwill was unhesitatingly extended to this next generation of Grubbs, by making for the group their debut album, ‘Pass the Hat’, once more on a purely speculative basis. Thus the torch of Early Music, lit by the Dolmetsch family and passed to Michael Morrow and John Sothcott, was received by those whose task it would be to keep the flame alight, and to take it onwards into the 21st. century - a cause to which the Canzona would make its own contribution by joining Phil Pickett in a very successful tour of Italy and Greece, lasting several weeks. This, however, was to be its swan song.

So ends this history of ‘The St. George's Canzona’, its origins and its outcomes - doubtless similar to the many other stories which might be recounted by such other musicians as have made it their business to see that Early Music enters the mainstream of our present day musical consciousness.

== Discography ==
There are three items missing from the discography of the Canzona to be found on its website.

These are:

- An early undated recording made for and by Denis Stevens under the name of the Canzona Ensemble
- The Elizabethan Appeal - the album made for the St. George's Theatre. (ARGO ZPL 1154 - undated)
- Giles Farnaby's Dream Band - (ARGO ZDA 158, dated 1973)
- Pass the Hat - Noise of Minstrels, (Unicorn-Kanchana DKP (CD) 9060, dated 1987)

See also the discography on AllMusic.

== Sources ==
- Early Music Today (December 2014 – February 2015), "Tributes to John Sothcott and Selene Mills", page 9.
