= The Jazz Couriers =

British jazz quintet

The Jazz Couriers were a British jazz quintet formed in April 1957 and which disbanded in August 1959.

The quintet's first line-up consisted of Tubby Hayes and Ronnie Scott on tenor saxophones, with Terry Shannon (piano), Malcolm Cecil (bass) and Bill Eyden (drums) and made their debut on the opening night at the new Flamingo Club in Wardour Street, Soho. They shared the gig with Tony Kinsey's Quintet featuring Joe Harriott. The Jazz Couriers were chosen by the National Jazz Federation to play the opening sets when the Dave Brubeck Quartet made their first tour of the UK in February 1958.

Cecil had been replaced by Phil Bates on bass for their first recording, which also included two tracks with Jimmy Deuchar on trumpet.

By August 1958, Bates had been replaced by Jeff Clyne, who would in turn be replaced by Spike Heatley. The band disbanded in August 1959, shortly before Scott opened his own club, Ronnie Scott's, just around the corner in Gerrard Street, in October that year.

They recorded four albums and appeared on some BBC radio and TV broadcasts.

== Original albums ==
- The Jazz Couriers (1957)
- In Concert (1958)
- The Last Word (US title The Message From Britain) (1958)
- The Couriers of Jazz (1959)
