= Tempo Records (UK) =

British jazz record label

UK Tempo label c. 1950

Tempo Records was an independent British jazz record label.

The label was founded in 1946 by Ron Davies, and Colin Pomroy, with premises on Piccadilly Arcade, London (run by Stephen Appleby).

This label had two periods of activity. In the late 1940s and early 1950s Tempo re-released a series of discs of recordings made c. 1930 for Paramount and a series of discs of musicians working in the revivalist idiom recorded for the marque.

From about 1955, after the label was sold, modernists such as Jimmy Deuchar, Tubby Hayes, and Dizzy Reece were recorded. The last recording session took place in late 1960, and the label was shut down.

== See also ==
- List of record labels
