= Tubby Hayes =

British jazz saxophonist (1935–1973)

- Tubby Hayes c. 1959

Background information
- Born: Edward Brian Hayes; 30 January 1935; St Pancras, London, England
- Died: 8 June 1973 (aged 38) Hammersmith, London, England
- Genre: Jazz
- Occupation: Musician
- Instruments: Saxophones, flute, vibraphone
- Years active: 1951–1973
- Formerly of: Ronnie Scott, The Jazz Couriers

Edward Brian "Tubby" Hayes (30 January 1935 – 8 June 1973) was a British jazz multi-instrumentalist, best known for his virtuosic musicianship on tenor saxophone and for performing in jazz groups with fellow sax player Ronnie Scott and trumpeter Jimmy Deuchar. He is widely considered to be one of the finest jazz saxophonists to have emerged from Britain.

== Early life ==
Hayes was born in St Pancras, London, England, and grew up in Raynes Park, south-west London. His father was a BBC studio violinist who gave his son violin lessons from an early age. By the age of ten, Hayes was playing the piano, and started on the tenor sax at 11. Dizzy Gillespie was an early influence:

I always used to listen to swing music in the early 'Forties and, in fact, I was just a kid at the time. I did not really intend becoming a tenor player, though I always liked tenor. I think maybe Dizzy influenced me more than Parker because he was sort of more accessible, he caught your attention more. As far as my influences over the years are concerned, Getz was it at one stage in the proceedings, and later Rollins, Coltrane, Hank Mobley and, to a lesser degree, even Zoot [Sims].

Hayes attended Rutlish School (1946–1951) in Merton Park. After a period spent playing with various semi-professional bands around London, Hayes left school and started playing professionally at the age of 16.

== Career ==
=== 1951–1958 ===
Hayes's youthful promise on tenor saxophone was recognised in 1951 when, aged 16, he joined Kenny Baker's sextet, and later for big-band leaders such as Ambrose, Terry Brown, Tito Burns, Roy Fox, Vic Lewis and Jack Parnell. With the assistance of music impresario Tito Burns, Hayes formed his own octet in 1955, known as Tubby Hayes & His Orchestra. The group toured the UK extensively and recorded several sessions for Tempo Records but disbanded in 1956 as Hayes pursued other musical opportunities, including his own quartet.

Hayes's voracious musical interests resulted in his learning the vibraphone in early 1957, after having tried Victor Feldman's instrument on a gig. Although the vibes became an occasional instrument on some of his recordings, Hayes eventually became frustrated at lacking "the technique to do half the things I can do on the saxophone" and recorded his final solo on the instrument in 1966. Instead, Hayes's interest remained focused on woodwind instruments; in 1958 Hayes began learning flute and made his recording debut on the instrument a year later. He continued to feature the flute alongside his saxophone performances to the end of his recording career.

Hayes's breakthrough came in 1957 when he joined fellow tenor saxophonist Ronnie Scott to co-lead the Jazz Couriers, whose East Coast jazz aesthetic was influential within the British jazz scene and beyond. Scott, who would later also become known as a noted raconteur, had originally met Hayes in 1950 and was immediately impressed by the "fat kid's" virtuosity. The encounter was a story Scott would relate frequently: "This little boy came up, not much bigger than his tenor sax. Rather patronisingly I suggested a number and off he went. He scared me to death". Considered one of the most successful British jazz groups of its era, the Jazz Couriers would record a series of highly regarded albums and would engage in a successful tour with the Dave Brubeck Quartet.

=== 1959–1967 ===
By 1959, Hayes had reformed his quartet, resulting in the recording of Tubby's Groove. Released in the spring of 1960, Tubby's Groove was widely considered to be Hayes's best session to date, selling well and acquiring positive attention from the music press for its "maturity". It was during this time that Hayes attracted attention from Alfred Lion, co-founder of Blue Note Records. Through arrangement with Blue Note, Hayes's producer, Tony Hall, had successfully licensed a session by Dizzy Reece. This session was later issued by Blue Note in 1959 as Blues in Trinity and featured Reece and Hayes alongside Art Taylor and Donald Byrd. The appearance of both Reece and Hayes on a US jazz recording was considered as a "major coup" for British jazz and one that raised their profile such that both were "short-listed" by Art Blakey for membership in the Jazz Messengers, although neither worked with Blakey. Hall sought a similar arrangement with Blue Note for Hayes as Reece but instead of negotiating an arrangement for what was deemed to be Hayes's best LP, Tubby's Groove, Hall sent a separate collection of tracks gathered from the same session recordings. Lion had it sequenced into an album for future release, but never issued it. The tapes of the un-issued session were thought to be lost until US jazz producer Michael Cuscuna discovered them among Lion's personal effects in 2008. The session was later issued as Tubby's New Groove.

Hayes signed to Fontana Records in 1961, quickly releasing his debut for the label, Tubbs. Fontana afforded Hayes greater international exposure as well as recording confidence, but would not yield the exposure he desired in the United States. Hayes would nevertheless remain with the label until his untimely death, releasing a series of highly regarded albums. Shortly after his signing to Fontana, Hayes was invited to play a residency at the Half Note Club in New York City as part of a new transatlantic Musicians' Union agreement negotiated by Pete King, with Zoot Sims performing at Ronnie Scott's as part of the exchange. While in the United States, Hayes recorded his next release,Tubbs in N.Y., with Clark Terry, Eddie Costa, and Horace Parlan. Hayes would return to the United States for extended visits throughout the early 1960s, bringing him into the orbit of many noted New York jazzmen, such as Paul Desmond, Miles Davis, Donald Byrd, Sonny Rollins, and Al Cohn. When visiting in 1962, Hayes recorded a session produced by Quincy Jones, released by Fontana as Return Visit!, with James Moody, Roland Kirk, Walter Bishop Jr, Sam Jones and Louis Hayes, and performed at the Washington Jazz Festival and the Half Note. Hayes played at the Half Note once again in 1964, at the Boston Jazz Workshop the same year, and at Shelly Manne's Manne-Hole in Los Angeles in 1965. Back in London, Hayes formed his own big band, working in television, film and radio, and even having his own television series (1961–1963). He stood in for Paul Gonsalves in February 1964 (with whom he also recorded twice: Just Friends recorded in February 1964, issued by Columbia, and Change of Setting recorded a year later), when the Ellington orchestra played at the Royal Festival Hall.

As well as leading his own bands and recording under his own name, Hayes also appeared on recordings by other UK-based jazz musicians, such as the Harry South Big Band and the Ian Hamer Sextet. However, by the mid-1960s opportunities for regular jazz performance were in decline as UK jazz haunts changed their allegiance to R&B and rock and roll. The British jazz circuit went 'a bit quiet' for a time and Hayes increasingly found himself working abroad, as well as cultivating a reputation as a session musician in diverse genres, including on such left-field recordings as Music in a Doll's House, the 1967 debut album by rock band Family.

Hayes appeared in a number of films, including All Night Long with Dave Brubeck and Charles Mingus, and (with his group) in A King in New York directed by Charlie Chaplin, The Beauty Jungle and Dr. Terror's House of Horrors. His contribution to film also included soundtrack appearances, including of the 1963 British film Stolen Hours, starring Susan Hayward.

=== 1968–1973 ===
Hayes's issues arising from the downturn in the UK jazz circuit were made worse by a combination of relationship, alcohol and narcotics issues, which by 1968 had begun to publicly affect his career. He was arrested at his home in Chelsea in August 1968 for possession of heroin and, owing to his difficulties with addiction, was given a suspended sentence. By the end of the following year, he had begun to experience breathing difficulties when playing, the latest in a long series of afflictions. In July 1971, he underwent open heart surgery to replace the mitral valve. This operation was successful and he began his comeback with an overseas tour, including a successful trip to Scandinavia in February 1972 where he performed with his Scandinavian quartet, featuring Staffan Abeleen, Niels-Henning Ørsted Pedersen and Alex Riel. A live performance of this quartet was captured on Tubby Hayes Quartet In Scandinavia, issued by Storyville.

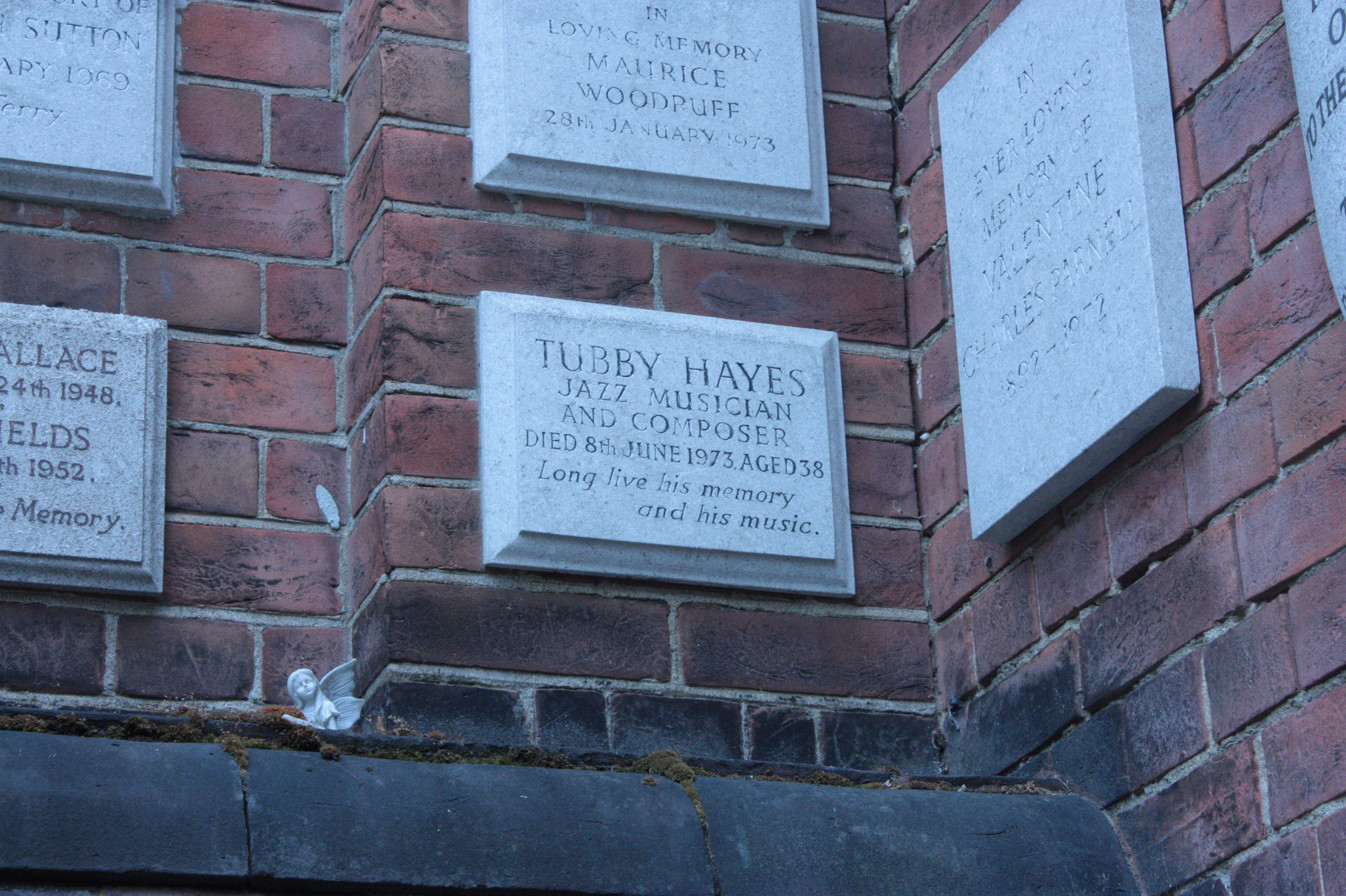
Memorial to Tubby Hayes, Golders Green Crematorium

Hayes died in June 1973, during a second heart operation at the Hammersmith Hospital, at the age of 38. He was cremated and the ashes interred at the Golders Green Crematorium, where there is a white stone memorial plaque affixed to one of the walls. The epitaph reads "Long Live His Memory And His Music."

== Legacy ==
Hayes left a legacy of recordings which became sought-after collector's items, almost all of which have been re-issued on CD. Despite a rumour that some early Tempo master tapes owned by Decca were discarded by the company, it was discovered that certain masters did still exist, including those for Tubby's Groove. Further tapes from this session were sent to Blue Note Records for consideration in 1960 but were subsequently lost until they were rediscovered in 2008. These were included in the album Tubby's New Groove, issued by Candid in 2011.

A full-length biography, The Long Shadow of The Little Giant: The Life, Work and Legacy of Tubby Hayes, by Simon Spillett, was published in 2015. The book received praise in both the specialist and non-specialist press, and was nominated among the top books of 2015 by The Guardian. Spillett has also catalogued Hayes's private tape archive and has organised the release of many previously unheard Hayes sessions on labels including Art Of Life, Rare Music, Fontana, Harkit, Tentoten, Savage Solweig, Gearbox, Trunk Records, Candid, Jasmine, Proper, Acrobat, Fantastic Voyage, Avid and Real Gone Jazz.

A documentary film, Tubby Hayes: A Man In A Hurry, was released in 2015. Directed by Lee Cogswell and produced by Mark Baxter, with narration by actor Martin Freeman, the film explored Hayes's life and influence on the UK jazz music scene of the 1950s and 1960s. The film was received favourably by critics as an affectionate but tragic portrait of Hayes.

== Discography ==
- 1955: The Little Giant, Volume 1 – Tubby Hayes and His Orchestra (Tempo EXA 14 [7-inch EP])
- 1955: The Little Giant, Volume 2 – Tubby Hayes and His Orchestra (Tempo EXA 17 [7-inch EP])
- 1955: The Swinging Giant, Volume 1 – Tubby Hayes Quartet (Tempo EXA 27 [7-inch EP])
- 1955: The Swinging Giant, Volume 2 – Tubby Hayes Quartet (Tempo EXA 28 [7-inch EP])
- 1955–56: Little Giant of Jazz – Tubby Hayes Quartet/Quintet (Imperial LP 9046)
- 1956: British Modern Jazz Scene 1956 – Tubby Hayes and His Orchestra (Tempo TAP 2)
- 1956: ...After Lights Out – Tubby Hayes Quintet (Tempo TAP 6)
- 1957: The Jazz Couriers Featuring Ronnie Scott and Tubby Hayes (Tempo TAP 15) – with Ronnie Scott, Terry Shannon, Phil Bates, Bill Eyden
- 1958: In Concert – The Jazz Couriers (Tempo TAP 22)
- 1958: The Eighth Wonder – Tubby Hayes (Tempo EXA 82 [7-inch EP]) – with Phil Bates, Bill Eyden
- 1959: England's Greatest Combo...The Couriers of Jazz! (London LTZ-L 15188)
- 1959: The Last Word – The Jazz Couriers (Tempo TAP 26) [also released as The Message From Britain (Jazzland JLP 934)]
- 1959: London Jazz Quartet (Tempo TAP 28) – with Alan Branscombe, Jack Fallon, Tony Crombie [rel. 1960]
- 1959: Tubby's Groove – Tubby Hayes Quartet (Tempo TAP 29) [rel. 1960]
- 1959: Tubby's New Groove – Tubby Hayes Quartet [rel. 2011]
- 1961: Tubbs (Fontana TFL 5142) [also released as Introducing Tubbs (Epic BA 17019)]
- 1961: Palladium Jazz Date [live] (Fontana TFL 5151) – album shared with Cleo Laine; Laine is on Side A, Hayes' quartet is on Side B.
- 1961: All Night Long (soundtrack) (Fontana TFL 5179/STFL 591) – with Dave Brubeck, Johnny Dankworth, Charles Mingus [rel. 1962]
- 1961: Tubbs in N.Y. (Fontana TFL 5183/STFL 595) [also released as Tubby The Tenor (Epic BA 17023)] – Tubby Hayes Sextet (including Clark Terry, Eddie Costa, Horace Parlan)
- 1962: Return Visit! (Fontana TL 5195) [also released as Tubby's Back In Town! (Smash SRS 67026)] – Tubby Hayes and The All Stars (including James Moody, Roland Kirk, Walter Bishop Jr.) [rel. 1963]
- 1962: Late Spot At Scott's [live] (Fontana TL 5200) – Tubby Hayes Quintet [rel. 1963]
- 1962: Down In The Village [live] (Fontana 680 998 TL) – Tubby Hayes Quintet [rel. 1963]
- 1963: A Tribute: Tubbs [live] [rel. 1981]
- 1963–65: Live In London (includes an interview with Hayes by Les Tomkins at The Old Place in Gerrard Street, London) [rel. 2004]
- 1963–66: Night And Day [live] [rel. 1995]
- 1964: Tubbs' Tours [not live] (Fontana STL 5221) – The Tubby Hayes Orchestra
- 1964: Dancing In The Dark [live] – Tubby Hayes Quintet [rel. 2011] ***note: sub-titled 'The Tubby Hayes Archive...Volume 02' (Savage Solweig SS-002CD)
- 1965: Commonwealth Blues (BBC recordings) [rel. 2005]
- 1965: Live At The Hopbine [rel. 2006]
- 1965: Intensity: The 1965 Tapes [live] [rel. 2008]
- 1966: Jazz Tête à Tête – with Les Condon Quartet [rel. 1994]
- 1966: Addictive Tendencies [live] [rel. 2005]
- 1966: Live At The Dancing Slipper [rel. 2005]
- 1967: 100% Proof (Fontana STL 5410) – The Tubby Hayes Orchestra
- 1967: Mexican Green (Fontana SFJL 911) – Tubby Hayes Quartet [rel. 1968]
- 1967: For Members Only: '67 Live – Tubby Hayes Quartet [rel. 1993]
- 1967–70: Lament [live] – Tubby Hayes Quartet [rel. 2010] ***note: sub-titled 'The Tubby Hayes Archive...Volume 01' (Savage Solweig SS-001CD)
- 1968: The Syndicate: Live At The Hopbine 1968, Vol. 1 [rel. 2005]
- 1969: Grits, Beans and Greens: The Lost Fontana Studio Sessions 1969 – Tubby Hayes Quartet (Fontana) [rel. 2019]
- 1969: Live 1969 – Tubby Hayes Quartet [rel. 1986]
- 1969: 200% Proof (BBC broadcast) – The Tubby Hayes Orchestra [rel. 1992]
- 1969: Rumpus [live] – The Tubby Hayes Big Band [rel. 2015] ***note: sub-titled 'The Tubby Hayes Archive...Volume 03' (Savage Solweig SS-003CD)
- 1970: The Orchestra – The Tubby Hayes Orchestra (Fontana 6309 002)
- 1972: Tubby Hayes Quartet In Scandinavia [live] [rel. 1998]
- 1972: Symphony: The Lost Session [live] [rel. 2015]
- 1972: Split Kick: Live In Sweden 1972 [rel. 2016] ***note: sub-titled 'The Tubby Hayes Archive...Volume 04' (Savage Solweig SS-004CD)

With Jack Costanzo

- Equation In Rhythm (Fontana TFL 5190/STFL 598, 1962)

With Tony Crombie and His Men

- Atmosphere (Columbia EMI 33SX 1119, 1959)

With Johnny Dankworth and His Orchestra

- What the Dickens! (Fontana TL 5203, 1963)

With Jimmy Deuchar

- Pub Crawling (Contemporary C 3529, 1957)

With Georgie Fame and The Harry South Big Band

- Sound Venture (Columbia EMI SX 6076, 1966)

With Victor Feldman

- Suite Sixteen (Contemporary C 3541, 1955 [rel. 1958])

With Paul Gonsalves

- Just Friends (Columbia EMI SX 6003, 1964)
- Change of Setting (World Record Club ST 631, 1965 [rel. 1967])

With Dizzy Reece

- Changing The Jazz At Buckingham Palace (Savoy MG 12111, 1956)
- Blues in Trinity (Blue Note BLP 4006/BST 84006, 1958)

With Lalo Schifrin

- The Liquidator (soundtrack) (MGM E 4413, 1965)

With The Stan Tracey Big Band

- Alice In Jazz Land (Columbia EMI SX 6051, 1966)

== Bibliography ==
- Carr, Ian, Digby Fairweather, & Brian Priestley – The Rough Guide To Jazz (ISBN 1-85828-528-3)
- Massarik, Jack – "Mr. 100 Percent", Jazzwise 90, September 2005
- Spillett, Simon – The Long Shadow of The Little Giant: The Life, Work and Legacy of Tubby Hayes (ISBN 978-1781791738)
