= Malcolm Cecil =

English musician and record producer (1937–2021)

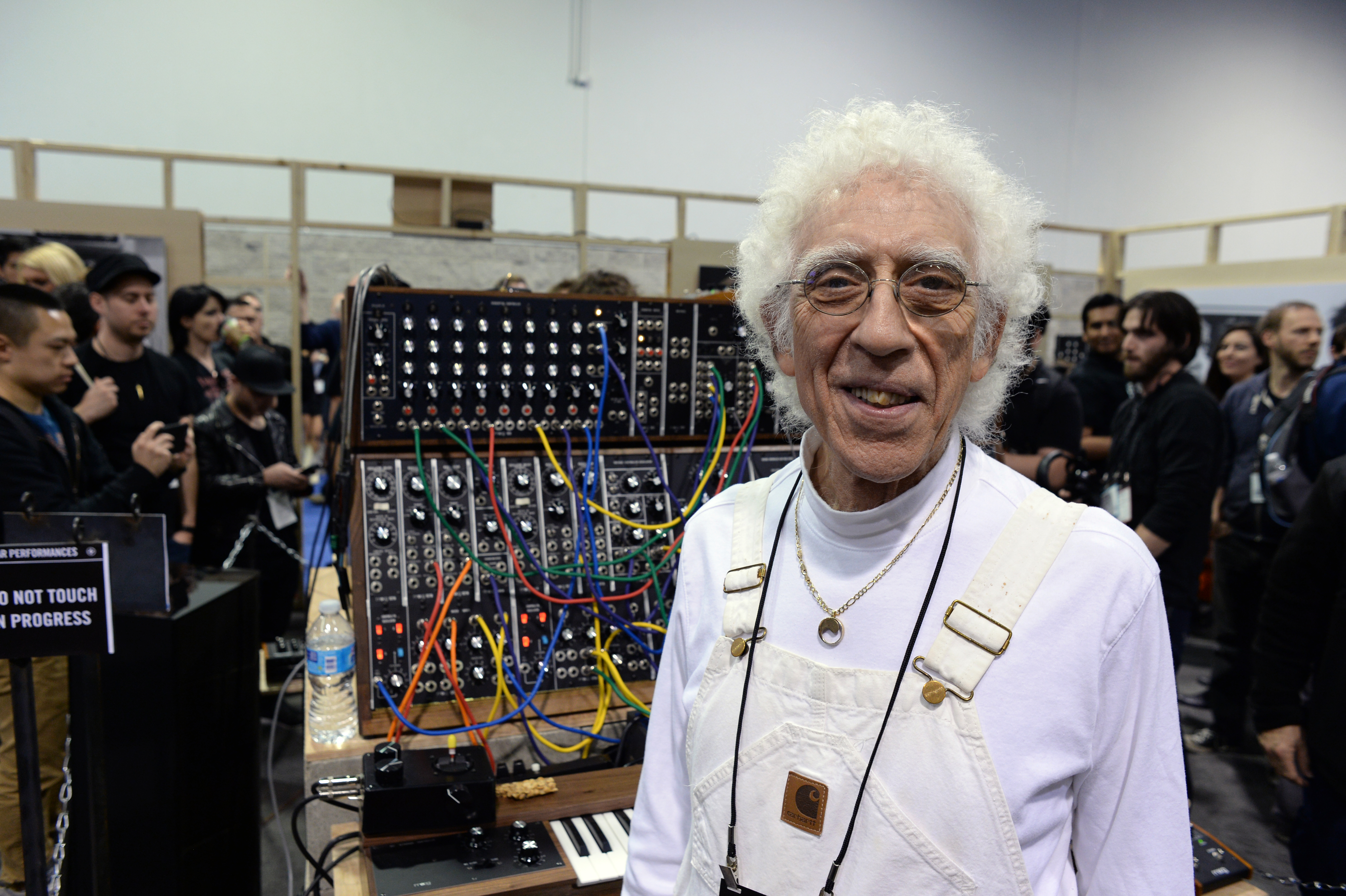
- Cecil in 2015

Background information
- Born: 9 January 1937; London, England
- Died: 28 March 2021 (aged 84) Saugerties, New York, USA
- Genres: Jazz; electronic; pop; rock; funk
- Occupations: Audio engineer; bassist; electrical engineer; record producer
- Instruments: Bass guitar; double bass; synthesizer

Malcolm Cecil (9 January 1937 – 28 March 2021) was a British jazz bassist, record producer, engineer, electronic musician and teacher. He was a founding member of a leading UK jazz quintet of the late 1950s, the Jazz Couriers, before going on to join a number of British jazz combos led by Dick Morrissey, Tony Crombie and Ronnie Scott in the late 1950s and early 1960s. Cecil subsequently collaborated with Robert Margouleff to form the duo TONTO's Expanding Head Band, a project based on a unique combination of synthesizers which led to them collaborating on and co-producing several of Stevie Wonder's Grammy-winning albums of the early 1970s. The TONTO synthesizer was described by Rolling Stone as "revolutionary".

== Early life and jazz career ==
Cecil was born in London on 9 January 1937. His parents taught him piano at the age of four and he took up the double bass at 16. He became a ham radio enthusiast by age nine. He studied physics at the London Polytechnic from 1957-58 and worked as an engineer in the Royal Air Force from 1958-61. During this time he was learning to be a professional jazz musician as a bass player.

From 1956 Cecil was playing with Dizzy Reece on European tours. He then joined the Jazz Couriers, performing with Ronnie Scott and Tubby Hayes, and playing in bands led by Don Rendell, Dill Jones and Tony Crombie. In 1959 he became a founding member of the Emcee Five, which from 1960 also included Mike and Ian Carr. Others he worked with in the early 1960s included Peter King and in the Jazz Five with Vic Ash and Harry Klein. He also joined Cyril Davies and Alexis Korner to form the original line-up of Blues Incorporated. From 1961 Cecil was working full time as an electronics consultant, but continued to perform, with Dick Morrissey, Bobby Wellins and Chris Barber among others. In 1963 he was playing with the Stan Tracey Trio at Ronnie Scott's.

In 1964 with Mike Jeffery he set up a jazz club in Newcastle, the Downbeat, and there he recorded a performance of House of the Rising Sun which later inspired The Animals to record their hit version. For the BBC he built a recording studio at the Marquee Club in London.

Cecil suffered from serious lung problems. Having been told he had only three years to live he moved to South Africa in 1967 in search of a better climate, before relocating to San Francisco. After a stint at the Los Angeles recording studio of Pat Boone, Cecil settled in New York City and began to modulate.

== Electronic music ==
With Robert Margouleff, Cecil formed the duo TONTO's Expanding Head Band, a synthesizer-based project. The duo were closely associated with Stevie Wonder's Talking Book (1972), sharing the Best Engineered Album, Non-Classical award as well as collaborating on and co-producing classic Wonder albums such as Music of My Mind, Innervisions and Fulfillingness' First Finale. Cecil is credited, with Margouleff, as engineer for the Stevie Wonder-produced album Perfect Angel (1974), by Minnie Riperton.

Cecil and Margouleff began constructing "The Original New Timbral Orchestra" (TONTO) in 1968. It became the largest analog synthesizer, as well as the most advanced one at the time. It had a height of 6 feet (1.8 m), a maximum diameter of 25 feet (7.6 m), and a mass of one ton. The massive synthesizer with Malcolms revolutionary newly designed joy stick modular and pioneering a way to make the multiple keyboards to play more than one key at a time and could talk to each other for the first time made revolutionizing the way synthesizers could be played forever. TONTO's debut was the pair's first album Zero Time (1971). Their unique sound made them highly sought-after and they went on to collaborate with, amongst others, Quincy Jones, Bobby Womack, the Isley Brothers, Billy Preston, Gil Scott-Heron, Weather Report, Stephen Stills, the Doobie Brothers, Dave Mason, Little Feat, Joan Baez, and Steve Hillage. TONTO also appeared in Phantom of the Paradise (1974), although Cecil was reportedly incensed because he had not approved of its use in the film and only used it as a prop.

The vocalist Gil Scott-Heron, who wrote that he considered Cecil a creative genius, along with keyboardist Brian Jackson enlisted Cecil and his TONTO synthesizer for the production of their collaborative album, 1980. Scott-Heron and Jackson were featured on the album cover with the synthesizer. TONTO was described as "revolutionary" by Rolling Stone, but it eventually fell behind more modern synthesizers that were simpler to utilize.

== Later life ==
Cecil sold TONTO in 2013 to the National Music Centre in Calgary. Through John Leimseider, the museum finished a complete restoration of the synthesiser five years later, with Leimseider dying shortly afterwards. TONTO continued to be on display there at the time of Cecil's death.

Cecil died on 28 March 2021. He was 84 and suffered from an unspecified long illness prior to his death.

Malcolm was survived by his wife of 63 years, Poli Cecil, and their son, Milton "Moonpup" Cecil.

== Honours and recognition ==
Cecil was nominated for and won a Grammy Award in 1973 for best engineered recording – non-classical. This was in recognition for the work he did with Margouleff on Wonder's Innervisions. He and Robert Margouleff beat Pink Floyd's The Dark Side of the Moon and Elton John's seminal Goodbye Yellow Brick Road. Malcolm and Margouleff were also nominated for best Engineer (non-Classical) in 1973 for Talking Book. Cecil was later bestowed the Unsung Hero award for lifetime achievement by Q magazine in 1997.

== Discography ==
As leader/co-leader

=== Solo ===
- 1981 Radiance

=== With TONTO's Expanding Headband ===
- 1971: Zero Time
- 1974: It's About Time
- 1996: TONTO Rides Again (compilation of above)

As sideman

- 1961: It's Morrissey, Man! – Dick Morrissey Quartet
- 1961: The Tony Crombie Orchestra
- 1961: Let's Take Five – Emcee Five
- 1962: Bebop from the East Coast – Emcee Five
- 1971: Dixie Chicken - Little Feat
- 1971: Where Would I Be? – Jim Hall Trio
- 1973: 3+3 – The Isley Brothers
- 1974: Live It Up – The Isley Brothers
- 1975: The Heat Is On – The Isley Brothers
- 1976: Harvest for the World – The Isley Brothers
- 1978: Secrets – Gil Scott-Heron (with Brian Jackson)
- 1980: 1980 – Gil Scott-Heron (with Brian Jackson)
- 1980: Real Eyes – Gil Scott-Heron
- 1981: Reflections – Gil Scott-Heron
- 1982: Moving Target – Gil Scott-Heron
- 1983: Shut 'Um Down; Angel Dust (singles) – Gil Scott-Heron
- 1994: Spirits – Gil Scott-Heron
- 1996: A Jazzy Christmas – Bill Augustine
- 2009: A Jazzy Christmas 2 – Bill Augustine
- 2011: We're New Here – Gil Scott-Heron (with Jamie xx)
- 2018: ‘’The Malcolm Cecil Project’’ - Eric Binder Trio

== Production, programming, and/or engineering ==
As producer, programmer, and/or engineer:

=== With Stevie Wonder ===
- 1972: Music of My Mind
- 1972: Talking Book
- 1973: Innervisions
- 1974: Fulfillingness' First Finale
- 1991: Jungle Fever

=== Various ===
- Dave Mason – It's Like You Never Left (1973)
- Mandrill – Beast From The East (1975)
- Billy Preston – It's My Pleasure (1975)
- Billy Preston – Billy Preston (1976)
- Steve Hillage – Motivation Radio (1977)
- Savoy Brown – Kings of Boogie (1989 – recording engineer)
- Neil Norman – Greatest Science Fiction Hits lV (1998)
- Pete Bardens – Watercolours (2002)
