= Michael Carvin =

American jazz drummer

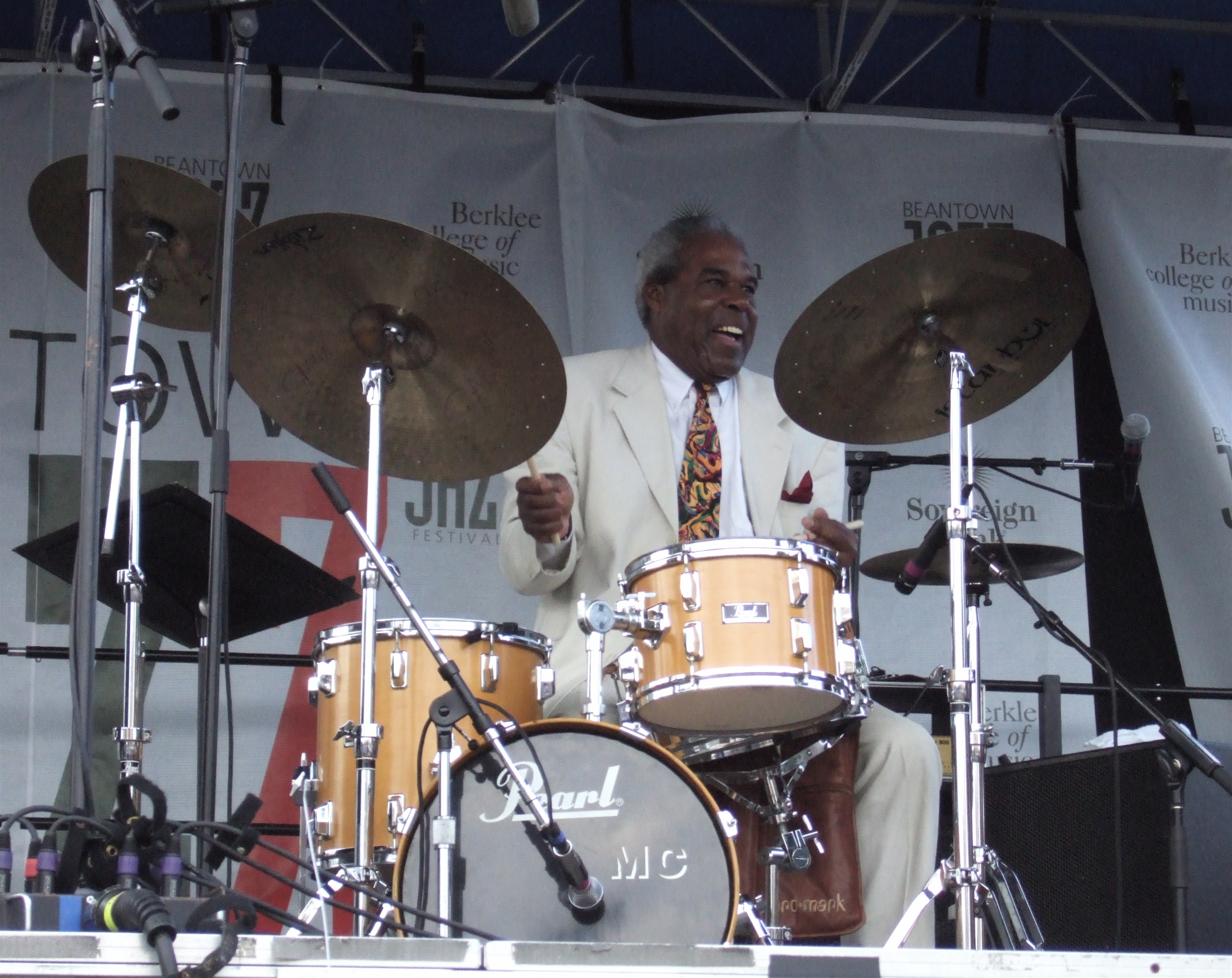
- Carvin in 2005

Background information
- Born: Michael Wayne Carvin; December 12, 1944 (age 81); Houston, Texas, U.S.
- Genre: Jazz
- Occupation: Musician
- Instrument: Drums
- Years active: 1970–present
- Labels: SteepleChase, Muse

Michael Wayne Carvin (born December 12, 1944) is an American jazz drummer.

== Biography ==
Born in Houston, Texas, Carvin began his musical training at the age of six with his father, one of the top drummers in Houston. By the age of twelve, Carvin began playing professionally and won what would be the first of five consecutive Texas rudimental championships. Carvin's career has included two years as a staff drummer with Motown Records, as well as studio and television work on the West Coast.

Joining Freddie Hubbard's band in 1973, Carvin moved to New York City, where he gained a reputation as one of the most formidable drummers on the jazz scene. A prime example of his work with Hubbard can be seen on the Mosaic Records/Jazz Icons DVD, released in late 2011 featuring Carvin with Hubbard's first touring group.

In addition to leading his own bands, Carvin has played and recorded with Dizzy Gillespie, Dexter Gordon, Jackie McLean, Hank Jones, McCoy Tyner, Illinois Jacquet, Pharoah Sanders, Bobby Hutcherson, James Moody, Hampton Hawes, Ruth Brown, Johnny Hartman, Abbey Lincoln, Jimmy Smith, Hugh Masekela, Alice Coltrane, Cecil Taylor, Charles Brown, Terumasa Hino, Bobby Watson, Billy Bang, and many others.

Carvin has recorded on more than 250 albums. He is also a drum teacher and clinician.

== Discography ==
- The Camel (SteepleChase, 1975)
- Antiquity with Jackie McLean (SteepleChase, 1975)
- First Time (Muse, 1988)
- Between Me and You (Muse, 1989)
- Revelation (Muse, 1991)
- Each One Teach One (Muse, 1994)
- Drum Concerto at Dawn (Mapleshade, 1996)
- Marsalis Music Honors Michael Carvin (Marsalis Music/Rounder, 2006)
- Flash Forward (Motema, 2014)

=== As sideman ===
With Billy Bang

- Vietnam: The Aftermath (Justin Time, 2001)
- Vietnam: Reflections (Justin Time, 2005)

With Henry Franklin

- The Skipper (Black Jazz, 1972)
- Blue Lights (Ovation, 1976)

With Hampton Hawes

- This Guy's in Love with You (Freedom, 1974)
- A Little Copenhagen Night Music (Freedom, 1977)

With Terumasa Hino

- Live in Warsaw (Century, 1991)
- Unforgettable (Blue Note, 1992)

With Hannibal Lokumbe

- Hannibal (MPS, 1975)
- Live in Lausanne (Baystate, 1978)

With Lonnie Liston Smith

- Expansions (RCA/Flying Dutchman, 1975)
- Visions of a New World (RCA/Flying Dutchman, 1975)
- Live! (RCA Victor, 1977)

With Dakota Staton

- Darling Please Save Your Love for Me (Muse, 1992)
- No Man Is Going to Change Me (GP, 1985)

With others

- Luther Allison, Night Life (Gordy, 1976)
- Ernie Andrews, No Regrets (Muse, 1993)
- Hamiet Bluiett, If You Have to Ask...You Don't Need to Know (Tutu, 1991)
- Cecil Bridgewater, I Love Your Smile (Bluemoon, 1992)
- Doug Carn, Infant Eyes (Black Jazz, 1971)
- Charles Davis, Super 80 (Nilva, 1984)
- Will Downing, A Dream Fulfilled (Island, 1991)
- Bill Easley, Business Man's Bounce (18th & Vine, 2007)
- Bunky Green, Visions (Vanguard, 1978)
- Della Griffin, Travelin' Light (Muse, 1994)
- Friedrich Gulda, Tales of World Music (Amadeo, 1979)
- Billy Hart, Enchance (Horizon, 1977)
- Julius Hemphill, The Boyé Multi-National Crusade for Harmony (New World, 2021)
- Randy Johnston, Jubilation (Muse, 1994)
- Frank Lacy, Tonal Weights and Blue Fire (Tutu, 1991)
- Frank Lowe, Lowe-Down & Blue (CIMP, 2002)
- Johnny Lytle, Possum Grease (Muse, 1995)
- Pat Martino, Starbright (Warner Bros., 1976)
- Cecil McBee, Mutima (Strata-East, 1974)
- Jackie McLean, New York Calling (SteepleChase, 1975)
- Pharoah Sanders, Elevation (Impulse!, 1974)
- Frank Strozier, Remember Me (SteepleChase, 1977)
- Reggie Workman, Conversation (Denon, 1979)
