= Joe Beck =

American jazz guitarist (1945–2008)

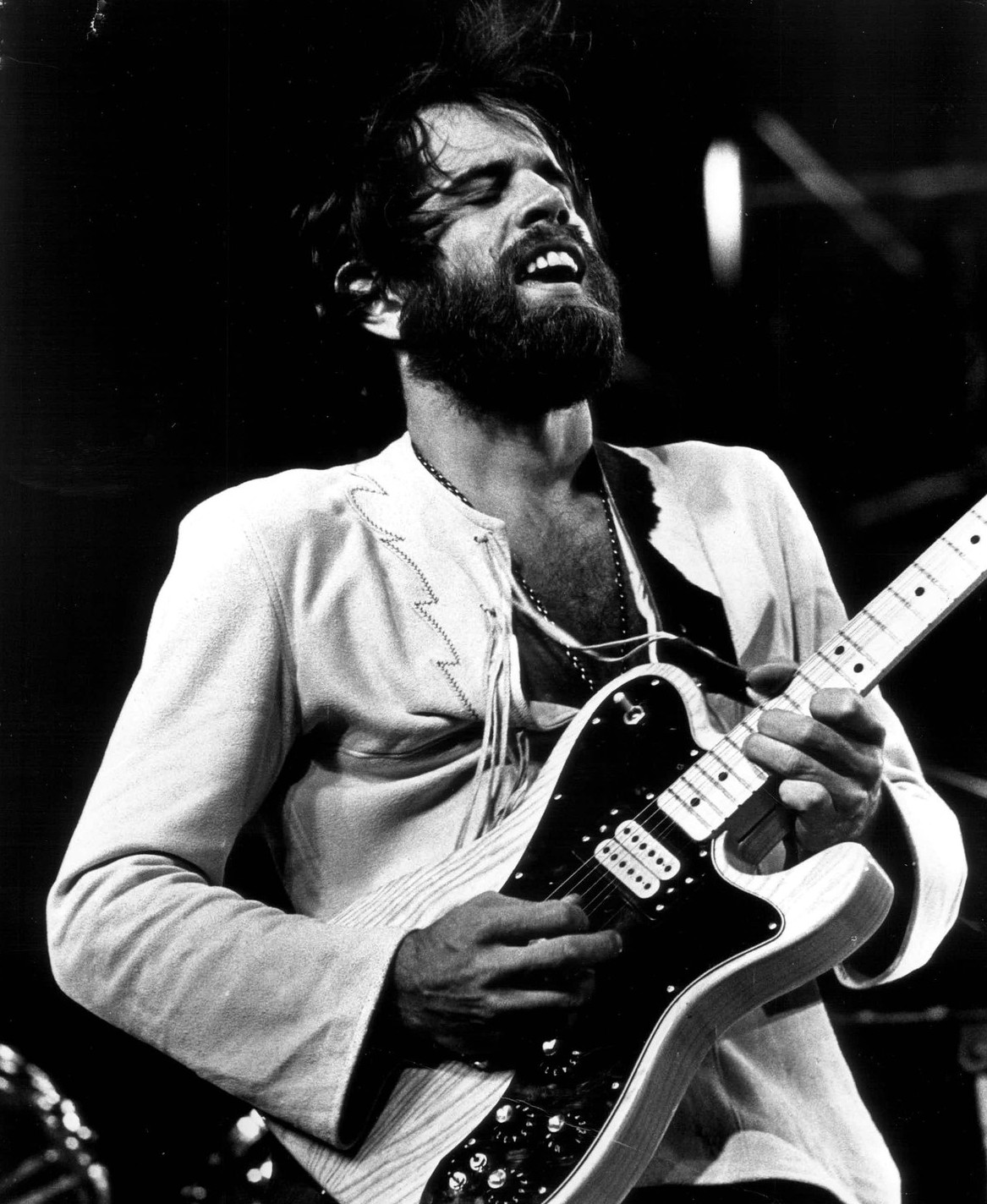
- Beck in 1977

Background information
- Born: July 29, 1945; Philadelphia, Pennsylvania, U.S.
- Died: July 22, 2008 (aged 62) Woodbury, Connecticut
- Genres: Jazz, jazz fusion, jazz funk, funk, soul jazz
- Occupation: Musician
- Instrument: Guitar
- Years active: 1960s–2008
- Labels: Kudu, DMP, Whaling City Sound

Joe Beck (July 29, 1945 – July 22, 2008) was an American jazz guitarist who was active for over 40 years.

== Biography ==
Born in Philadelphia, Beck moved to Manhattan in his teens, playing six nights a week in a trio setting, which gave him an opportunity to meet various people working in the thriving New York music scene. By the time he was 18, Stan Getz hired him to record jingles, and in 1967 he recorded with Miles Davis. By 1968, at age 22, he was a member of the Gil Evans Orchestra. Beck described his early success in an interview near the end of his life:

My career happened because I happened to be in the right place at the right time in a very unique time of jazz music. ...when I would finish a gig around two in the morning I would go around the corner to the Playboy Club and sit in with Monty Alexander and let Les Spann take a breather and I would finish the gig for him. Then we would go and listen to Kenny Burrell play around the corner or we would go up to Mintons and listen to Wes Montgomery and sit in with him ...

Beck played in a variety of jazz styles, including jazz fusion, post bop, mainstream jazz, and soul jazz, but also respected rock stylists and cross-over players (he was good friends with Larry Coryell) and briefly flirted with rock music styles himself in the late 1960s and early 1970s.

In 1970 Polydor released Rock Encounter, a fusion collaboration with flamenco guitarist Sabicas. In 1975 he released an eponymous album (upon which he simply referred to himself as "Beck") while recording the Esther Phillips album, What a Diff'rence a Day Makes, both for Kudu. Beck was subsequently reissued as Beck & Sanborn to cash in on the success of alto saxophonist David Sanborn. In 1971, Beck left music for three years to become a dairy farmer, citing frustration with his career.

In 1978, he went for more of a rock sound by forming a band named "Leader". They performed in the Northeast and recorded demos at Sound Ideas Studios in New York City, but soon disbanded when the band's gear was stolen after a gig at Joyous Lake in Woodstock, New York. In the 1980s Beck recorded for DMP including with flautist Ali Ryerson. In 1988, Beck left music again for a return to farming, but was touring again by 1992. Beck toured and recorded with duos and small groups, releasing two more solo albums (1988, 1991). In 2000, he collaborated with guitarist Jimmy Bruno on Polarity, which extensively featured Beck's alto guitar, and in 2008 on Coincidence with John Abercrombie.

Beck worked as a sideman or session guitarist with a wide variety of well-known jazz, rock, and fusion musicians, including Louis Armstrong, Duke Ellington, Buddy Rich, Woody Herman, Miles Davis, Maynard Ferguson, Howard Roberts, Tommy Tedesco, Larry Coryell, John Abercrombie, Tom Scott, Jeremy Steig, and Gábor Szabó. In mid-life Beck spent less time playing and worked more as a composer of commercial jingles and as an arranger, writing arrangements for Frank Sinatra and Gloria Gaynor. Joe also arranged and produced many records including projects for Frank Sinatra, Gloria Gaynor, and two albums for Esther Phillips including her hit single, "What A Difference A Day Makes". Over the years, Joe was signed to contracts with Columbia, Polydor, Verve, Gryphon, CTI, and MGM Records.

Joe Beck played guitar on James Brown's singles and albums in 1974. The National Academy of Recording Arts and Sciences honored Beck five times with its Most Valuable Player Award. Beck also recorded with the Royal Philharmonic Orchestra in London, the Milan Philharmonic in Italy, and The Paris String Ensemble in France.

Beck's first wife, Sigi, was a model and later married an internationally renowned economist, Dr. Zoran Hodjera. At Beck's death, he was married to Marsi Beck and was survived by five children.

Beck died in Woodbury, Connecticut, of complications from lung cancer. His album Get Me Joe Beck was posthumously released in 2014.

== Alto guitar ==
In 1992 Beck began touring as a duo with flutist Ali Ryerson. To fill out the sound he wanted to present—bass lines, harmony, and melody—in a duo setting, he developed what he called the "alto guitar". This began as a standard, full-body, electric jazz guitar with a unique stringing pattern and reentrant tuning. As described by Beck:

It's pretty straight-ahead, really. Take your whole guitar and tune it down a fifth to the key of A, and then tune the middle two strings up an octave. What I've done is take the normal tuning of the guitar and changed it so that I have bass strings for my thumb; sort of a banjo register for my first two fingers, and then a low melody register for my other two fingers. [...] So you don't have to change any of your fingerings; it's the same intervals as in normal tuning, just in the key of A, so it's A-D-G-C-E-A."

While devising the tuning Beck realized that some restringing was going to be needed to obtain optimal resonance from the strings, so he commissioned a custom-built instrument from luthier Rick McCurdy, of Cort Guitars:

I had someone build me a guitar, Rick McCurdy as it happens, and he made me a beautiful guitar and so I started using it on the concert stage.

I'm actually playing through three channels. The reason the guitar is a patented invention is that this pickup is split so that the bass strings have their own output. And the top four melody strings are coming out of another output, which in turn is split stereo by a chorus. The bass strings are .080 and .060. Then a .022 wound and a .016 plain. Then a .026 wound and a .018 plain. [...] I wanted to be more pianistic, to play clusters sort of like those Bill Evans employs, that you couldn't possibly play otherwise."

Beck owned and played both Martin (CF-2) and Cort Alto guitars, and both Martin and Cort standard-tuning versions as well.

== Signature guitars ==
Joe Beck worked with guitar manufacturer Cort Guitars in the 1990s to create two hollow-body jazz guitar models. The first was the BECK-6 model, which was an electric, hollow-bodied archtop jazz guitar, and the second was the BECK-ALTO model, a similar instrument but designed for heavier strings and alto tuning. In 2001, the retail price of the BECK-6 model was $895, and the BECK-ALTO model was $1195. Two finishes were available on both guitars, a blonde "natural" finish, and a black-and-orange "vintage burst" finish.

The main differences between the models were the accommodations made for thicker strings on the BECK-ALTO model, and only one electronic pickup on the BECK-ALTO versus two on the BECK-6. The single pickup on the ALTO had split bass/treble controls for the lower two strings versus the upper four, and consequently, three knobs on the front of the guitar, versus four knobs on the BECK-6. Both Cort guitar models could be purchased directly from Joe Beck through his website and at guitar dealers. The BECK-6 is much more common, versus the BECK-ALTO, of which an estimated 200 were made.

BECK-6 Specifications

  - Body sides: Laminate Maple
  - Body back: Laminate Maple
  - Body top: Laminate Spruce
  - Neck wood: Maple
  - Fretboard: Rosewood, 12 Inch Radius
  - Neck contour: C
  - Neck inlays: MOP Dot
  - Scale length: 24–3/4"
  - Nut width: 1–11/16"
  - Lower Bout: 16–1/4"
  - Body Depth: 3–11/16
  - Center block: None (hollow body)
  - Bound: Multi-Ply binding
  - Cutaway: Venetian
  - Headstock: Makers Logo and artists signature
  - Pickups: Mighty Mite covered vintage alnico humbuckers
  - Pickguard: Wood
  - Controls: 2 Volume, 2 Tone, and 3 Way Toggle (pickup selection)
  - Bridge: Wooden Floating Base and Tune-o-matic Saddles
  - Tailpiece: Trapeze (Hofner-like)
  - Accessories: Hardshell case

== Discography ==
=== As leader ===
- Nature Boy (Verve Forecast, 1969)
- Beck (Kudu, 1975)
- Watch the Time (Polydor, 1977)
- Beck and Zoller (Progressive, 1979)
- Relaxin ' (DMP, 1983)
- Friends (DMP, 1984)
- Back to Beck (DMP, 1988)
- The Journey (DMP, 1991)
- Live at Salishan with Red Mitchell (Capri, 1994)
- Finger Painting (Wavetone, 1995)
- Alto with Ali Ryerson (DMP, 1999)
- Polarity with Jimmy Bruno (Concord Jazz, 2000)
- Strangers in the Night (Venus, 2000)
- Django with Ali Ryerson (DMP, 2001)
- Just Friends (Whaling City Sound, 2002)
- What Is My Heart For with Sarah Brooks (Whaling City Sound, 2002)
- Brazilian Dreamin' (Venus, 2006)
- Tri07 (Whaling City Sound, 2007)
- Coincidence with John Abercrombie (Whaling City Sound, 2008)
- Get Me Joe Beck (Whaling City Sound, 2014)

=== As sideman ===
With Gene Ammons

- Big Bad Jug (Prestige, 1972)
- Got My Own (Prestige, 1973)

With Gato Barbieri

- Fenix (Flying Dutchman, 1971)
- The Legend of Gato Barbieri (Flying Dutchman, 1973)
- Caliente! (A&M, 1976)
- Bahia (Fania, 1982)
- Passion and Fire (A&M, 1984)

With James Brown

- Hell (Polydor, 1974)
- Reality (Polydor, 1974)
- Funky President(single) (Polydor, 1974)

With Joe Farrell

- Penny Arcade(CTI, 1974)
- Upon This Rock (CTI, 1974)
- Canned Funk (CTI, 1975)

With Jay Leonhart

- There's Gonna Be Trouble (Sunnyside, 1984)
- The Double Cross (Sunnyside, 1988)
- Two Lane Highways (Kado, 1992)
- Four Duke (LaserLight, 1995)
- Galaxies and Planets (Sons of Sound, 2001)

With Mike Mainieri

- Insight (Solid State, 1968)
- Journey Thru an Electric Tube (Solid State, 1968)
- White Elephant Vol. 1 (NYC, 1994)
- White Elephant Vol. 2 (NYC, 1994)

With Jimmy Scott

- Mood Indigo (Grooveland, 2000)
- But Beautiful (Milestone, 2002)
- Moon Glow (Milestone, 2003)

With Don Sebesky

- Don Sebesky & the Jazz Rock Syndrome (Verve, 1968)
- The Rape of El Morro (CTI, 1975)
- Three Works for Jazz Soloists & Symphony Orchestra (Gryphon, 1979)

With others

- Franco Ambrosetti & Don Sebesky, Sleeping Gypsy (Gryphon, 1980)
- Burt Bacharach, Futures (A&M, 1977)
- John Berberian, Middle Eastern Rock (Verve Forecast 1969)
- Soledad Bravo, Mambembe (Top Hits, 1983)
- Rusty Bryant, For the Good Times (Prestige, 1973)
- David Chesky, Rush Hour (Columbia, 1980)
- Willy Chirino, Diferente Oliva (Cantu, 1980)
- Freddy Cole, Rio de Janeiro Blue (Telarc, 2001)
- Larry Coryell, The Lion and the Ram (Arista, 1976)
- Larry Coryell, Tributaries (Novus Arista, 1979)
- Hank Crawford, Wildflower (Kudu, 1973)
- Miles Davis, Circle in the Round (Columbia, 1979)
- Richard Davis, Song for Wounded Knee (Flying Dutchman, 1973)
- Les DeMerle, Spectrum (United Artists, 1969)
- Paul Desmond, Summertime (A&M, 1968)
- Duke Ellington & Teresa Brewer, It Don't Mean a Thing If It Ain't Got That Swing (Columbia, 1983)
- Gil Evans, Gil Evans (Ampex, 1970)
- Gil Evans, Where Flamingos Fly (Artists House, 1981)
- Maynard Ferguson, Ridin' High (Enterprise, 1968)
- Maynard Ferguson, Chameleon (Columbia, 1974)
- Ronnie Foster, Cheshire Cat (Blue Note, 1975)
- Carlos Franzetti, New York Toccata (Verve, 1985)
- The Free Spirits, Live at the Scene February 22nd 1967 (Sunbeam, 2011)
- Nnenna Freelon, Maiden Voyage (Concord Jazz, 1998)
- Nnenna Freelon, Soulcall (Concord Jazz, 2000)
- Gloria Gaynor, Glorious (Polydor, 1977)
- Gloria Gaynor, Gloria Gaynor (Atlantic, 1982)
- Gerri Granger, Add a Little Love (United Artists, 1972)
- Chico Hamilton, Peregrinations (Blue Note, 1975)
- Lionel Hampton, Mostly Blues (Musicmasters, 1989)
- Woody Herman, Giant Steps (Fantasy, 1973)
- Woody Herman, Feelin' So Blue (Fantasy, 1981)
- Lena Horne & Michel Legrand, Lena & Michel (RCA Victor, 1975)
- Freddie Hubbard, Riding High Plus Jazz Symphonies Solo Brothers & Professor Jive (DRG, 1989)
- Jackie & Roy, Star Sounds (Concord Jazz, 1980)
- J. J. Johnson & Kai Winding, Betwixt & Between (A&M, 1969)
- Quincy Jones, Smackwater Jack (A&M, 1971)
- Kimiko Kasai, This Is My Love (CBS/Sony, 1975)
- Sarah Kernochan, House of Pain (RCA Victor, 1974)
- Al Kooper, Easy Does It (Columbia, 1970)
- Al Kooper, The Landlord (United Artists, 1971)
- Earl Klugh, Wishful Thinking (Capitol, 1984)
- Hubert Laws, The Chicago Theme (CTI, 1975)
- Michel Legrand, Michel Legrand and Friends (RCA Victor, 1976)
- Pete Levin, Jump! (Pete Levin, 2010)
- Webster Lewis, On the Town (Epic, 1976)
- Jack McDuff, Who Knows What Tomorrow's Gonna Bring? (Blue Note, 1971)
- Jack McDuff, The Fourth Dimension (Cadet, 1974)
- Helen Merrill & Gil Evans, Collaboration (EmArcy, 1988)
- Helen Merrill, Casa Forte (Absord Music, 1995)
- Bingo Miki and the Inner Galaxy Orchestra, Montreux Cyclone (Three Blind Mice, 1979)
- Blue Mitchell, Many Shades of Blue (Mainstream, 1974)
- Red Mitchell, Empathy with (Gryphon, 1980)
- Idris Muhammad, Power of Soul (Kudu, 1974)
- Idris Muhammad, House of the Rising Sun (Kudu, 1976)
- Gerry Niewood, Share My Dream (DMP, 1985)
- Laura Nyro, Smile (Columbia, 1976)
- Ralfi Pagan, I Can See (Fania, 1975)
- Johnny Pate, Outrageous (MGM, 1970)
- Johnny Pate, Brother On the Run (Perception, 1973)
- Houston Person, Sweet Buns & Barbeque (Prestige, 1973)
- Esther Phillips, What a Diff'rence a Day Makes (Kudu, 1975)
- Esther Phillips, For All We Know (Kudu, 1976)
- Doug Proper, Seventh Sense (Proper Attire Records 2004)
- Buddy Rich, The Roar of '74 (Groove Merchant, 1974)
- Buddy Rich, Ease On Down the Road (Denon/LRC, 1987)
- Buddy Rich & Maynard Ferguson, Two Big Bands Play Selections from West Side Story & Other Delights (LRC, 1991)
- Dom Um Romao, Dom Um Romao (Muse, 1974)
- Dom Um Romao, Spirit of the Times (Muse, 1975)
- Annie Ross, Music Is Forever (DRG, 1996)
- Sabicas, Rock Encounter (Polydor, 1970)
- David Sanborn, Taking Off (Warner Bros., 1975)
- Philippe Sarde, Hors-La-Loi (Carrere, 1985)
- Doc Severinsen, Doc Severinsen's Closet (Command, 1970)
- Ian Shaw, Soho Stories (Milestone, 2001)
- Paul Simon, Still Crazy After All These Years (Columbia, 1975)
- Paul Simon, One-Trick Pony (Warner Bros., 1980)
- Jimmy Smith, The Other Side of Jimmy Smith (MGM, 1970)
- Lonnie Liston Smith, Astral Traveling (Flying Dutchman, 1973)
- Lew Soloff, Rainbow Mountain (Enja, 1999)
- Leon Spencer, Bad Walking Woman (Prestige, 1972)
- Leon Spencer, Where I'm Coming From (Prestige, 1973)
- Marvin Stamm, Machinations (Verve, 1968)
- Sylvia Syms, She Loves to Hear the Music (A&M, 1978)
- Tom Talbert, This Is Living! Pipe Dream (Chartmaker, 1997)
- Leon Thomas, Full Circle (Flying Dutchman, 1973)
- Bobby Timmons, Do You Know the Way? (Milestone, 1968)
- Bobby Timmons, Got to Get It! (Milestone, 1968)
- Libby Titus, Libby Titus (Columbia, 1977)
- Cal Tjader, Last Bolero in Berkeley (Fantasy, 1973)
- Stanley Turrentine, Inflation (Elektra, 1980)
- Bill Watrous, Manhattan Wildlife Refuge (Columbia, 1974)
- Kai Winding, Penny Lane & Time (Verve, 1967)
