= Informed Sources =

Informed Sources may refer to:

- Informed Sources, long running political discussion show on WYES-TV
- Informed Sources (Day East Received), a 1969 novel by Willard S. Bain
