= Jon Appleton =

American composer and teacher (1939–2022)

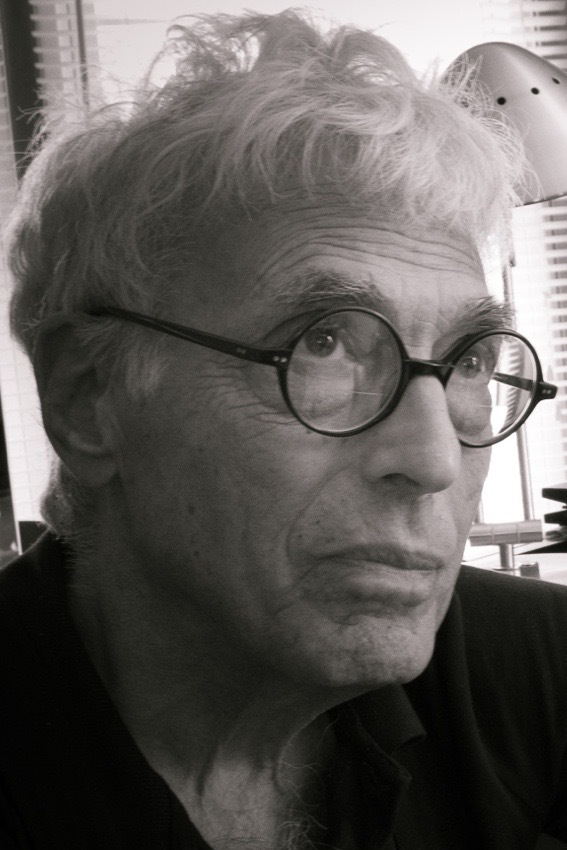
Appleton in 2013

Jon Howard Appleton (January 4, 1939 – January 30, 2022) was an American composer, an educator and a pioneer in electro-acoustic music. His earliest compositions in the medium, e.g. "Chef d'Oeuvre" and "Newark Airport Rock" (1967) attracted attention because they established a new tradition some have called programmatic electronic music. In 1970, he won Guggenheim, Fulbright and American-Scandinavian Foundation fellowships. When he was twenty-eight years old, he joined the faculty of Dartmouth College where he established one of the first electronic music studios in the United States. He remained there intermittently for forty-two years. In the mid-1970s, he left Dartmouth to briefly become the head of Elektronmusikstudion (EMS) (sv) in Stockholm, Sweden. In the late 1970s, together with Sydney Alonso and Cameron Jones, he helped develop the first commercial digital synthesizer called the Synclavier. For a decade he toured around the United States and Europe performing the compositions he composed for this instrument. In the early 1990s, he helped found the Theremin Center for Electronic Music at the Moscow Conservatory of Music. He also taught at Keio University (Mita) in Tokyo, Japan, CCRMA at Stanford University and the University of California Santa Cruz. In his later years, he devoted most of his time to the composition of instrumental and choral music in a quasi-Romantic vein which has largely been performed only in France, Russia and Japan.

== Early life ==
Appleton was born in Los Angeles, California, on January 4, 1939, to Jewish parents: Helen Jacobs Appleton (born in Philadelphia, 1908) and Charles Leonard Appleton (born Chaim Epelboim in Kishinev, Bessarabia, July 14, 1900). His mother was employed by Metro-Goldwyn-Mayer and his father by Twentieth Century Fox film studios. His father left his family the year Appleton was born and he spent his first years in Mrs. Bell's (an orphanage) and with his brother (Michael Charles Appleton, born 1932) at Palomar Military Academy. When he was six years old his mother married Alexander "Sasha" Walden (born in Ufa, Russia, in 1897), a double-bass player in the Los Angeles Philharmonic orchestra. He was the greatest musical influence in Appleton's young life seeing that he studied piano, encouraging him to compose music and taking him to multiple concerts. Appleton's parents were true believers in the Soviet Union and active members of the multiple left-wing organizations including the Communist party. In the 1950s both his parents were blacklisted by the House Un-American Activities Committee and lost their jobs. As a child Appleton studied piano with Jacob Gimpel and Theodore Saidenberg but preferred composing his own music rather than playing the works assigned to him (e.g. Chopin, Scarlatti, Prokofiev). However, he developed a deep, lifelong affection for Russian music.

== Career ==
=== 1960s ===
From 1957 to 1961 Appleton was a student at Reed College in Portland, Oregon. These years shaped his future life: he composed for his fellow students who performed everything he composed, he decided to become a college professor and in 1959 he married his first wife, a fellow student, Georganna Towne. Following his graduation from Reed College, Appleton moved to San Francisco, California, where his first child was born (Jennifer Appleton). Simultaneously he studied composition with Andrew Imbrie at the University of California, Berkeley, collaborated with writer Willard S. Bain (1938–2000) writing musical comedies and was employed at the Macy's department store as an assistant buyer.

In 1962–1963 Appleton was the music teacher at the Verde Valley School in Sedona, Arizona, where he conducted the choir and orchestra, taught music theory, history and piano lessons.

From 1963 to 1966 Appleton was a graduate student at the University of Oregon in Eugene, Oregon, where he studied with Homer Keller, Henri Lazarof, Felix Salzer and Robert Trotter. It was there that he assembled a primitive electronic music studio and composed his first works in this genre. His thesis was an orchestral work, After "Nude Descending a Staircase". Most of the instrumental and vocal music he composed at this time used serial technique that he loved to compose. During his years in Eugene he became a lifelong friend of the pianist Gabriel Chodos.

In 1966, on the basis of his early electronic music, he was invited by Vladimir Ussachevsky at Columbia University to study in the Columbia-Princeton Electronic Music Center. He became an advocate for electronic music and became friends with fellow composers Charles Dodge, Emmanuel Ghent and Richard Taruskin.

During 1966–1968 he was hired by Oakland University in Rochester, Michigan, to establish an electronic music studio. When the university officials reneged on their promise, he resigned and accepted a position at Dartmouth College. It was during this year that his son, Jon Jason Appleton was born (a.k.a. JJ Appleton; born April 19, 1967).

=== 1970s ===
At Dartmouth College Appleton's work in electronic music was generously encouraged by the administration of President John G. Kemeny and by a generous donation from Gerald Bregman '54. The Bregman Electronic Music studio was one of the pioneering studios at American universities and became a center for many visiting composers. Two of these, Lars-Gunnar Bodin (1935, Stockholm, Sweden – 2021) and Jean-Claude Risset (born 1938, LePuy, France) became important colleagues throughout Appleton's life. In 1970 Appleton also was influenced by the work of the "father" of computer music, Max V. Mathews and by French composers François Bayle, Beatriz Ferreyra and Michel Redolfi.

It was at this time that he initiated the first competition for electronic music that was held for three years at Dartmouth College.

In 1969 Appleton's first recordings were published (Syntonic Menagerie and Human Music – the latter in collaboration with jazz musician Don Cherry – on the Flying Dutchman label, produced by Bob Thiele.

In 1973 Appleton began his collaboration with engineers Sydney Alonso and Cameron Jones, which led to the creation of the Dartmouth Digital Synthesizer and ultimately the Synclavier. However, it was not until the 1980s that Appleton composed his best works for this digital synthesizer and on which he gave concerts of his own music for the following decade.

His love of Sweden led Appleton to leave Dartmouth College in 1976–1977 and become the director of Elektronmusikstudion, Sweden's national center for electronic music. His difficulty with the Swedish bureaucracy led to his resignation and he returned to Norwich, Vermont, as a partner, for one year, in the newly formed firm New England Digital Corporation that had begun to manufacture the Synclavier. The following year he returned to the faculty of Dartmouth College.

It was also during this time in his life that Appleton developed a serious interest in the music of Polynesia and Micronesia. He led a group of Dartmouth students to the Kingdom of Tonga and later received a grant from the National Endowment for the Arts to train radio personnel on the Micronesian islands of Chuuk and Pohnpei to record and broadcast their own music.

=== 1980s ===
It was during this period that Appleton began to compose his best computer music and live-electronic music. Many of his works for this genre were first premiered at the annual festival held by the Groupe de Musique Experimentale de Bourges (France) and at Fylkingen in Stockholm, Sweden.

During his time in Bourges, Appleton became a founding member of the International Confederation for Electro-Acoustic Music (). His stimulating interaction with composers from many nations led him to believe that a similar organization in the United States might help raise the profile of electro-acoustic music in his own country. In 1984, together with a small group of like-minded composers, Appleton helped establish the Society for Electro-Acoustic Music in the United States (SEAMUS). He ultimately served for a time as president of the society.

In the summer of 1984 Appleton helped Moses Asch, founder of Folkways Records, release its first recordings of electro-acoustic music. According to Asch's wishes, these recordings have remained in print under the Smithsonian/Folkways auspices.

=== 1990s ===
The decade of the 1990s saw Appleton spending increasing amount of time abroad: teaching at Keio University (Mita) in Tokyo, Japan, for three years and frequently visiting Moscow, Russia, where he was inspired by the enthusiasm of young composers. He encouraged the composer/engineer Andre Smirnov to establish the Theremin Center at the Moscow Conservatory of Music. Appleton was first introduced to Russian musicians and artists by the choral conductor/ethnologist Dmitri Pokrovsky (1944–1996) and this began his compositional return to instrumental and choral music, much of it composed for the pianist Julia Turkina and cellist Alexander Zagorinsky. In an essay entitled "How I Became a Russian Composer" (2009) Appleton explains his love of Russian music and culture that he believes his stepfather, Alexander Walden, instilled in him.

Also in this decade Appleton composed two full-length operas for a choir of 1500 children and professional orchestra. The works, HOPI: La naissance de Desert and Le Dernier Voyage de Jean-Gallup de la Perouse, were conducted by Alain Joutard and commissioned by the Delegation Departmental à la Musique et à la Danse of the Conseil General des Alpes-Maritimes in Nice, France.

== Personal life and death ==
Appleton died on January 30, 2022, at his home in Vermont, at the age of 83.

== Works ==
- "Apolliana" (1970)
- "CCCP (In Memoriam: Anatoly Kuznetsov)" (1969)
- "Ce que signifie la déclaration des droits de l'Homme et du citoyen de 1789 pour les hommes et les citoyens des îles Marquises" (1989)
- "Chef d'œuvre" (1967)
- "Degitaru Ongaku" (1983)
- "Dima Dobralsa Domoy" (1996)
- "Dr Quisling in Stockholm" (1971)
- "Georganna's Fancy" (1966)
- "Georganna's Farewell" (1975)
- "Homage To Orpheus" (1969)
- "Homenaje a Milanés" (1987)
- "Human Music" (1969)
- "In Deserto" (1977)
- "In Medias Res" (1978)
- "King's Road #8" (1970)
- "Mussems Sång" (1976)
- "Newark Airport Rock" (1969)
- "Oskuldens Dröm" (1985)
- "'Otahiti" (1973)
- "San Francisco Airport Rock" (1996)
- "Spuyten Duyvil" (1967)
- "Stereopticon" (1972)
- "The Sydsing Camklang" (1976)
- "Syntrophia" (1977)
- "Times Square Times Ten" (1969)
- "'U ha'amata 'atou 'i te himene" (1996)
- "Yamanotesen To Ko" (1997)
- "Zoetrope" (1974)

== Recordings ==
"Sashasonjon"
From the album Four Fantasies for Synclavier (1984). Composed and performed by Jon Appleton on the Synclavier II.

- Times Square Times Ten (1969)
- Appleton Syntonic Menagerie (Flying Dutchman Records, 1969)
- Human Music (with Don Cherry) (1970)
- The World Music Theatre of Jon Appleton (Folkways Records, 1974)
- The Dartmouth Digital Synthesizer (Folkways, 1976)
1. "Georganna's Farewell" (audio via YouTube)
- Music for Synclavier and Other Digital Systems: With Jon Appleton, Composer (Folkways, 1978)
- The Tale of William Mariner and The Snow Queen (1982)
- Two Melodramas for Synclavier (Folkways, 1982)
- Four Fantasies for Synclavier, (Folkways, 1982)
- CDCM (Consortium to Distribute Computer Music) – Vol. 6: The Computer Music Studio (series) (1990)
1. "Brush Canyon"
4. "Degitaru Ongaku"

Produced at The Bregman Electronic Music Studio, Dartmouth College.
Centaur CRC 2052.
Discogs release ID 376127.
AllMusic album ID mw0001367376.
OCLC 221038958, 23361266, 221715272, 1069306162, 912739571, 782901990, 220949766.

- CDCM – Vol. 11: The Virtuoso in the Computer Age – II (1991)
6. "Homenaje a Milanes," Jon Appleton and Neil Rolnick, computer music systems.

Recorded and produced with support from The Bregman Electronic Music Studio at Dartmouth
Centaur CRC 2133.
Discogs release ID 623521.
AllMusic album ID mw0001826434.
OCLC 890729969.

- CDCM – Vol. 15: The Virtuoso in the Computer Age – V: Music For the Matthews/Boie Radio Drum and Radio Baton (1994)
2. "Pacific Rimbombo," Max Mathews (radio drum) (1992)

Centaur CRC 2190
Discogs release ID 1773079.
AllMusic album ID mw0001371262.
OCLC 889982094, 767690601, 911745337, 986753145, 30941232, 778855005, 1180811331.

- Contes de la mémoire (empreintes DIGITALes, IMED 9635, 1996)
- Wunderbra! (with Achim Treu) (2003)
- Syntonic Menagerie 2 (2003)
- The Russian Music Phoenicia (2009)
- The Scarlatti Doubles/The Couperin Doubles Phoenicia (2013)

== Bibliography ==
=== References ===
- Appleton, Jon (2009). "How I Became a Russian Composer". Russian Music, The (CD) (liner notes). Montreal: Phoenicia Publishing. p. 4. ISBN 978-0-9781-7494-1. OCLC 431052321 – via Issuu.
- "Flying Dutchman Discography, 1969–1984". Discogs.
- Lyon, Eric David (2000). "The Bregman Electronic Music Studio at Dartmouth College". Proceedings of the 2000 International Computer Music Conference: August 27 – September 1, 2000. Vol. 2000. San Francisco. pp. 404–405. ISSN 2223-3881. OCLC 1123664389 – via University of Michigan Library.
- "3 Dartmouth Professors Win Guggenheim Awards". Rutland Daily Herald. Vol. 117, no. 101. April 28, 1970. p. 11 (col. 6) – via Newspapers.com. (see List of Guggenheim Fellowships awarded in 1970).
- "Synclavier Early History". 500sound.com. Synclavier European Services; © Cameron W. Jones. n.d.
- Waxenberg, Elise (September 30, 2005). "Long-Time Music Prof Leaves for Stanford". The Dartmouth. Hanover, New Hampshire: Dartmouth College. Archived from the original on October 22, 2014 – via Wayback Machine.

=== Reviews and treatises ===
- CDCM – Vol. 11: Perkis, Tim (Winter 1993). "Review: CDCM Volume 11: The Virtuoso in the Computer Age – II, by Larry Austin, Gareth Loy, Chris Chafe, Dexter Morrill, Neil Rolnick, Rodney Washchka, John Appleton, and Larry Polansky". Computer Music Journal. 17 (4). The MIT Press: 85–86. doi:10.2307/3680551. JSTOR 3680551. OCLC 7377038833.
- CDCM – Vol. 11: Sydney Morning Herald, The; Covell, Roger (August 2, 1993). "Recordings – Computer the Key to New Music Melodies – The Virtuoso in the Computer Age: CDCM Computer Music Series, Vol. 11". Guide (album review). Vol. whole no. 48645. p. 10S – via Newspapers.com.
