= Thembi =

Studio album by Pharoah Sanders
- Released: May 1971
- Recorded: November 15, 1970 & January 12, 1971
- Studio: Record Plant, Los Angeles; Record Plant, New York City
- Genre: Jazz
- Length: 41:12
- Label: Impulse!
- Producer: Ed Michel, Bill Szymczyk

Pharoah Sanders chronology
Deaf Dumb Blind (1970)	Thembi (1971)	Black Unity (1971)

Thembi is the seventh album by American free jazz saxophonist Pharoah Sanders, released in May 1971. It is dedicated to his South-African wife Nomathemba "Thembi" ("faith and hope" in Xhosa), as noted on the back sleeve of the original album.

== Overview ==
On Thembi, Sanders moved away from the long, intense compositions of his earlier albums and produced an album of shorter tracks. Sanders plays tenor and soprano saxophones, alto flute, koto, balafon, various percussion instruments, and a cow horn on the album.

Thembi was pianist Lonnie Liston Smith's final recording with Sanders. Also featured on the album are violinist Michael White, bassist Cecil McBee, and percussionists Chief Bey, Majid Shabbaz, and Nat Bettis. "Thembi", "Astral Travelling" and "Morning Prayer" were included on the two-disc compilation You've Got to Have Freedom, on Soul Brother Records.

Tracks 1–4 were recorded at the Record Plant in Los Angeles on November 25, 1970. Track 4 is an unaccompanied bass solo. Tracks 5–6 were recorded at the Record Plant in New York City on January 12, 1971. The assistant engineer was Lillian Davis Douma.

Lonnie Liston Smith began experimenting with electric keyboards while recording the album:

On Thembi, that was the first time that I ever touched a Fender Rhodes electric piano. We got to the studio in California — Cecil McBee had to unpack his bass, the drummer had to set up his drums, Pharoah had to unpack all of his horns. Everybody had something to do, but the piano was just sitting there waiting. I saw this instrument sitting in the corner and I asked the engineer, 'What is that?' He said, 'That's a Fender Rhodes electric piano.' I didn't have anything to do, so I started messing with it, checking some of the buttons to see what I could do with different sounds. All of a sudden I started writing a song and everybody ran over and said, 'What is that?' And I said, 'I don't know, I'm just messing around.' Pharoah said, 'Man, we gotta record that. Whatcha gonna call it?' I'd been studying astral projections and it sounded like we were floating through space so I said let's call it 'Astral Traveling.' That's how I got introduced to the electric piano.

Smith's 1973 debut album was titled Astral Traveling, and includes a new recording of the composition.

== Reception ==
Professional ratings
Review scores
Source	Rating
AllMusic	4/5 stars
The Penguin Guide to Jazz Recordings	3/4 stars
The Rolling Stone Jazz & Blues Album Guide	3.5/5 stars

AllMusic gave Thembi four out of five stars, with reviewer Steve Huey describing it as offering "an intriguingly wide range of relatively concise ideas, making it something of an anomaly in Sanders' prime period.… Some fans may gripe that Thembi isn't conceptually unified or intense enough, but it's rare to have this many different sides of Sanders coexisting in one place, and that's what makes the album such an interesting listen."

In a review for All About Jazz, Chris May called "Astral Travelling" "a lush, sweeping group workout foursquare in the astral paradigm" and stated that it is "given an exquisite performance" on the album. Regarding "Red, Black & Green", May wrote, "Sanders' overdubbed saxophones are foregrounded practically throughout, played in a style closer to the tumultuous one adopted by Sanders when he was a member of saxophonist John Coltrane's groups." May also praised McBee's solo piece "Love", calling it "the sort of track that gives bass solos a good name" and commenting, "McBee turns in a corker, starting conventionally enough, albeit with frequent use of percussive, 'Africanized' string-on-wood effects, before focusing on cleanly articulated high-harmonics."

== Track listing ==
1. "Astral Travelling" (Lonnie Liston Smith) - 5:48
2. "Red, Black & Green" (Pharoah Sanders) - 8:56
3. "Thembi" (Sanders) - 7:02
4. "Love" (Cecil McBee) - 5:12
5. "Morning Prayer" (Sanders, Liston Smith) - 9:11
6. "Bailophone Dance" (Sanders) - 5:43

== Personnel ==
- Pharoah Sanders – tenor and soprano saxophones, alto flute, koto, brass bells, balafon, maracas, cow horn, fifes
- Lonnie Liston Smith – piano, Fender Rhodes electric piano, claves, percussion, ring cymbal, shouts, balafon
- Michael White – violin, percussion
- Cecil McBee – double bass, finger cymbals, percussion
- Roy Haynes – drums
- Clifford Jarvis – drums, maracas, bells, percussion
- Nat Bettis, Chief Bey, Majid Shabazz, Anthony Wiles – African percussion
- James Jordan – ring cymbal
