= House of the Rising Sun (Idris Muhammad album) =

Album by Idris Muhammad

Studio album by Idris Muhammad
- Released: January 14, 1976
- Recorded: June 18–27, 1975, September 23–October 8, 1975
- Studio: Van Gelder Studio in Englewood Cliffs, NJ
- Genre: Jazz-funk
- Length: 35:05
- Label: Kudu Records; KU-27 (LP); KICJ-836 (CD)
- Producer: Creed Taylor

Idris Muhammad chronology
| Power of Soul (1974) | House of the Rising Sun (1976) | Turn This Mutha Out (1977) |

Professional ratings
Review scores
| Source | Rating |
|---|---|
| Allmusic | 4.5/5 stars |

House of the Rising Sun is a 1976 album by American jazz musician Idris Muhammad.

== Track listing ==
All compositions arranged, adapted and conducted by David Matthews, except for "Sudan", arranged by Tom Harrell

| No. | Title | Writer(s) | Length |
|---|---|---|---|
| 1. | "House Of The Rising Sun" (featuring David Sanborn) | Traditional | 4:42 |
| 2. | "Baia (Boogie Bump)" | Ary Barroso, Ray Gilbert | 4:39 |
| 3. | "Hard To Face The Music" | Ashford & Simpson | 4:49 |
| 4. | "Theme For New York City (Based On Prelude No. 4)" | Frédéric Chopin | 3:26 |
| 5. | "Sudan" | Idris Muhammad, Tom Harrell | 10:52 |
| 6. | "Hey Pock A-Way" | A. Neville, G. Porter, J. Modelliste, L. Nocentelli | 6:06 |
| Total length: | | | 34:34 |

2003 digitally remastered CD bonus tracks
| No. | Title | Writer(s) | Length |
|---|---|---|---|
| 7. | "Pipe Stem" | Idris Muhammad, Tom Harrell | 5:27 |
| 8. | "I Know You Don't Want Me No More" | Barbara George | 4:41 |

== Personnel ==
- Idris Muhammad - drums
- Will Lee, Wilbur Bascomb - bass
- Eric Gale - guitar, bass
- Joe Beck - guitar
- Fred Wesley - trombone
- Leon Pendarvis, Don Grolnick, Roland Hanna - piano
- David Sanborn - alto saxophone
- George Young - tenor saxophone
- Ronnie Cuber - baritone saxophone
- George Devens - percussion
- Tom Harrell- trumpet (solo “Sudan”)
- Barry Rogers - trombone (solo “Sudan”)
- Bob Berg - tenor saxophone
- Patti Austin - vocals
- plus ensemble and vocalists.
