= New York Calling =

Studio album by Jackie McLean and the Cosmic Brotherhood
- Released: 1974
- Recorded: October 30, 1974
- Studio: Minot Sound, White Plains, NY
- Genre: Jazz
- Length: 59:09
- Label: SteepleChase; SCS-1023
- Producer: Nils Winther

Jackie McLean chronology
Antiquity (1974)	New York Calling (1974)	Like Old Times (1976)

New York Calling is an album by alto saxophonist Jackie McLean and the Cosmic Brotherhood, recorded in 1974 and released on the SteepleChase label.

== Reception ==
The AllMusic review by Jim Todd stated: "Jackie McLean's band on New York Calling, the Cosmic Brotherhood, plays with uncompromising passion, fury, and intelligence. The group, a generation younger than the leader, has a sound that is definitive '70s advanced hard bop. ...It's to McLean's credit that the date bears the stamp of his band's artistry as much as it does his own".

Professional ratings
Review scores
Source	Rating
AllMusic	4/5 stars
The Penguin Guide to Jazz Recordings	3/4 stars
The Rolling Stone Jazz Record Guide	3/5 stars

== Track listing ==
All compositions by Billy Skinner except as indicated

1. "New York Calling" - 10:14
2. "Star Dancer" - 12:25
3. "Camel Driver" (Billy Gault) - 8:53
4. "Some Other Time" (Gault) - 8:03
5. "Adrians Dance" - 8:52
6. "New York Calling" [Take 3] - 10:50 Bonus track on CD reissue

== Personnel ==
- Jackie McLean – alto saxophone

The Cosmic Brotherhood

- Billy Skinner – trumpet, arranger
- René McLean – soprano saxophone, alto saxophone, tenor saxophone, and bass clarinet
- Billy Gault – piano, arranger
- James Benjamin – bass
- Michael Carvin – drums
