= Deaf Dumb Blind (Summun Bukmun Umyun) =

Studio album by Pharoah Sanders
- Released: October 1970
- Recorded: July 1, 1970
- Studio: A & R, New York, NY
- Genre: Spiritual jazz
- Length: 39:02
- Label: Impulse!
- Producer: Ed Michel

Pharoah Sanders chronology
Jewels of Thought (1969)	Deaf Dumb Blind (Summun Bukmun Umyun) (1970)	Thembi (1971)

Deaf Dumb Blind (Summun Bukmun Umyun) is an album by the American jazz saxophonist Pharoah Sanders. It was recorded at A & R Studios in New York City on July 1, 1970, and released on Impulse! Records in the same year. The album's title is bilingual: "Summun Bukmun Umyun" is Arabic for "Deaf Dumb Blind".

The phrase صُمٌّ بُكْمٌ عُمْيٌ ṣummun, bukmun, ʻumyun is taken from verse 18 of Surat al-Baqarah in the Qur'an. According to the liner notes, the album is "predicated on spiritual truths and to the future enlightenment of El Kafirun or The Rejectors of Faith (non-believers)."

The performances on the album are strongly influenced by the music of Africa.

== Reception ==
Professional ratings
Review scores
Source	Rating
AllMusic	4/5 stars
The Penguin Guide to Jazz Recordings	3.5/4 stars
Pitchfork	8.6/10
The Rolling Stone Jazz & Blues Album Guide	3/5 stars
Uncut	9/10

Regarding the title track, Thom Jurek, writing for AllMusic, stated: "Sanders brings in the whole of his obsession with rhythm and R&B. Using African percussion, bylophones, shakers, cowbells, and all manner of percussion... Here the Latin and African polyrhythms collide and place the horns, as large and varied as they are, in almost a supplementary role. The horns check counterpoint in striated harmony, calling and responding over the wash of bass and drums and drums and drums! It evolves into a percussion orgy before the scary otherworldly multiphonic solos begin... And no matter how out it gets, those rhythms keep it rooted in the soul." Jurek called "Let Us Go Into The House Of The Lord" "a stunningly beautiful and contemplative work that showcases how intrinsic melodic phrasing and drones were to Sanders at the time -- and still are today. This piece, and this album, is a joyful noise made in the direction of the divine, and we can feel it through the speakers, down in the place that scares us."

Daniel Martin-McCormick, in a review for Pitchfork, commented: "Deaf Dumb Blind (Summun Bukmun Umyun) may be Sanders' finest work from this era... the group... breathes as one like never before. Coming off of a busy touring schedule, the players were locked in, often building songs out of loose ideas or hints of an arrangement. If the title track finds the players in a joyous, near-telepathic groove, 'Let Us Go Into the House of the Lord' is simply spiritual jazz of the highest order. Aching with emotion, it stands alongside Alice Coltrane’s 'Prema' and Albert Ayler's 'Our Prayer' as a devotional masterpiece and a fulfillment of free jazz's promise... The song's title couldn’t be more apt; the music exudes so much sorrow, hope, compassion, joy, and humanity it seems to truly reach for a home beyond our world."

== Track listing ==
1. "Summun, Bukmun, Umyun" (Sanders) – 21:16
2. "Let Us Go into the House of the Lord" (arr. by Lonnie Liston Smith) – 17:46

== Personnel ==
- Pharoah Sanders – soprano saxophone, cow horn, bells, tritone whistle, cowbells, wood flute, thumb piano, percussion
- Woody Shaw – trumpet, maracas, yodeling, percussion
- Gary Bartz – alto saxophone, bells, cowbell, shakers, percussion
- Lonnie Liston Smith – piano, cowbell, thumb piano, percussion
- Cecil McBee – bass
- Clifford Jarvis – drums
- Nat Bettis – xylophone, yodeling, African percussion
- Anthony Wiles – conga drum and African percussion
