= Skull Session =

Studio album by Oliver Nelson
- Released: 1975
- Recorded: January 7, 8 & 10, 1975; Los Angeles, CA
- Genre: Jazz
- Length: 39:11
- Label: Flying Dutchman BDL 1-0825
- Producer: Bob Thiele

Oliver Nelson chronology
Oliver Edward Nelson in London with Oily Rags (1974)	Skull Session (1975)	Stolen Moments (1975)

Skull Session is an album by American jazz composer/arranger Oliver Nelson featuring performances recorded in early 1975 for the Flying Dutchman label.

It was the penultimate album release for Nelson, who would pass away suddenly of a heart attack in October of the same year.

== Reception ==
Professional ratings
Review scores
Source	Rating
AllMusic	3.5/5 stars

AllMusic awarded the album 3½ stars, stating: "For this interesting session, Oliver Nelson (who wrote and arranged all eight numbers) utilizes electric keyboards and rock and funk rhythms in what is still a big-band jazz date".

== Track listing ==
All tracks are written by Oliver Nelson.

Side one
No.	Title	Length
1.	"Skull Session"	5:59
2.	"Reuben's Rondo"	2:57
3.	"125th St. and 7th Avenue"	6:19
4.	"One for Duke"	4:30

Side two
No.	Title	Length
1.	"Dumpy Mama"	4:38
2.	"Baja Bossa"	7:16
3.	"In a Japanese Garden"	3:07
4.	"Flight for Freedom"	4:25
Total length:		39:11

== Personnel ==
- Oliver Nelson - alto saxophone, arranger, conductor
- Bobby Bryant, Oscar Brashear (tracks 1–6 & 8) - trumpet, flugelhorn
- Paul Hubinon, Buddy Childers - trumpet (tracks 2–4)
- Grover Mitchell, Richard Nash, Chauncey Welsch - trombone (tracks 2–4)
- Maurice Spears - bass trombone (tracks 2–4)
- Vincent DeRosa, Davis Allan Duke - French horn (tracks 2–4)
- Don Waldrop - tuba (tracks 2–4)
- Jerome Richardson - alto saxophone, soprano saxophone, clarinet, flute
- Bud Shank - tenor saxophone, alto saxophone, clarinet, alto flute (tracks 2–4, 6 & 7)
- Buddy Collette - tenor saxophone, clarinet, tenor flute, alto flute (tracks 2–4, 6 & 7)
- Billy Green - tenor saxophone (tracks 1–5 & 8)
- Billy Perkins - tenor saxophone, baritone saxophone, bass clarinet (tracks 1–5 & 8)
- John Kelson Jr. - baritone saxophone, bass clarinet (tracks 6 & 7)
- Lonnie Liston Smith - electric piano (tracks 1–5 & 8)
- Mike Wofford - electric piano, harpsichord, synthesizer, piano
- Laurindo Almeida - guitar (tracks 6 & 7)
- Dennis Budimir, Lee Ritenour - electric guitar (tracks 1, 5 & 8)
- Chuck Domanico - bass, electric bass
- Shelly Manne - drums, percussion
- Jimmy Gordon - drums (tracks 1, 5 & 7)
- Willie Bobo - percussion
