= Antiquity (album) =

Studio album by Jackie McLean and Michael Carvin
- Released: 1975
- Recorded: August 16, 1974
- Studio: Tocano, Copenhagen, Denmark
- Genre: Jazz
- Length: 49:11
- Label: SteepleChase; SCS-1028
- Producer: Nils Winther

Jackie McLean chronology
The Source (1973)	Antiquity (1975)	New York Calling (1974)

Antiquity is an album by saxophonist Jackie McLean and percussionist Michael Carvin, recorded in 1974 and released on the SteepleChase label.

== Reception ==
The AllMusic review by Scott Yanow stated, "This is a unique project in the discography of Jackie McLean, and is well worth a few close listens".

Professional ratings
Review scores
Source	Rating
AllMusic	3/5 stars
The Penguin Guide to Jazz Recordings	3/4 stars
The Rolling Stone Jazz Record Guide	4/5 stars

== Track listing ==
All compositions by Jackie McLean except where noted.

1. "The Tob" – 4:10
2. "Antiquity: The Hump" – 6:15
3. "Antiquity: The Slaveship" – 3:08
4. "Antiquity: The Hunter and His Game" (Billy Skinner) – 5:09
5. "Antiquity: The Crossing" – 2:47
6. "Gong Go Lye" – 3:11
7. "Ti Ti" (Michael Carvin) – 8:38
8. "Down in the Bottom" – 4:08
9. "Deicomahleeah" (Carvin) – 11:42

== Personnel ==
- Jackie McLean – alto saxophone, piano, vocals, bamboo flute, bells, temple block, percussion
- Michael Carvin – drums, vocals, temple block, bells, bamboo flute, kalimba, percussion
