= Fénix (Gato Barbieri album) =

Studio album by Gato Barbieri
- Released: 1971
- Recorded: April 27 and 28, 1971
- Studio: Atlantic (New York)
- Genre: Jazz
- Length: 39:08
- Label: Flying Dutchman
- Producer: Bob Thiele

Gato Barbieri chronology
The Third World (1969)	Fénix (1971)	El Pampero (1971)

Fénix is an album by Argentinian jazz composer and saxophonist Gato Barbieri featuring performances recorded in 1971 and first released on the Flying Dutchman label.

== Reception ==
Professional ratings
Review scores
Source	Rating
AllMusic	4.5/5 stars
DownBeat	4.5/5 stars
The Penguin Guide to Jazz Recordings	3/4 stars

Writing in 1971 for The Village Voice, Robert Christgau referred to Fénix as "the first jazz I've played frequently for pleasure since In a Silent Way" (1969) by Miles Davis. The AllMusic site awarded the album 4½ stars, stating that "at this point in 1971, well before the Muppets would create a caricature out of him, Barbieri was absolutely smoking, and for a certain style of rhythmic free jazz, this is a captivating album indeed".

== Track listing ==
1. "Tupac Amaru" (Gato Barbieri) - 4:14
2. "Carnavalito" (Edmundo Zaldivar) - 9:08
3. "Falsa Bahiana" (Geraldo Pereira) - 5:50
4. "El Día Que Me Quieras" (Carlos Gardel, Alfredo Le Pera) - 6:12
5. "El Arriero" (Atahualpa Yupanqui) - 7:22
6. "Bahia" (Ary Barroso) - 6:22

== Personnel ==
- Gato Barbieri - tenor saxophone
- Lonnie Liston Smith - piano, electric piano
- Joe Beck - electric guitar (track 1)
- Ron Carter - electric bass
- Lenny White - drums
- Gene Golden - congas, bongos
- Naná Vasconcelos - berimbau, bongos
