= Expansions (Lonnie Liston Smith album) =

Studio album by Lonnie Liston Smith & The Cosmic Echoes
- Released: 1975
- Recorded: November 25 & 26, 1974
- Studio: New York City
- Genre: Jazz-funk
- Length: 39:12
- Label: RCA/Flying Dutchman; BDL1-0934
- Producer: Bob Thiele, Lonnie Liston Smith

Lonnie Liston Smith chronology
Cosmic Funk (1974)	Expansions (1975)	Visions of a New World (1975)

Expansions is an album by keyboardist Lonnie Liston Smith, featuring performances recorded in 1974 and released by the Flying Dutchman label the following year.

== Reception ==
Professional ratings
Review scores
Source	Rating
AllMusic	5/5 stars

In his review for AllMusic, Thom Jurek stated, "It is fully a jazz album, and a completely funky soul-jazz disc as well ... Smith plays both piano and electric keyboards and keeps his compositions on the jazzy side -- breezy, open, and full of groove playing that occasionally falls over to the funk side of the fence ... Summery and loose in feel, airy and free with its in-the-cut beats and stellar piano fills, Expansions prefigures a number of the "smooth jazz" greats here, without the studio slickness and turgid lack of imagination. ... The music on Expansions is timeless soul-jazz, perfect in every era. Of all the fusion records of this type released in the mid-'70s, Expansions provided smoother jazzers and electronica's sampling wizards with more material that Smith could ever have anticipated".

== Track listing ==
All compositions by Lonnie Liston Smith except where noted

1. "Expansions" − 6:04
2. "Desert Nights" − 6:42
3. "Summer Days" − 5:50
4. "Voodoo Woman" (Smith, Michael Carvin) − 4:20
5. "Peace" (Horace Silver, Doug Carn) − 4:15
6. "Shadows" − 6:20
7. "My Love" − 5:43

== Personnel ==
- Lonnie Liston Smith − piano, electric piano, electronic keyboard textures
- Donald Smith − flute, vocals, vocal textures
- Dave Hubbard − soprano saxophone, tenor saxophone, alto flute (tracks 2–4, 6 & 7)
- Cecil McBee − bass
- Art Gore − drums
- Michael Carvin − percussion, clavinet, drums (tracks 1, 2 & 4, 6 & 7)
- Leopoldo Fleming − bongos, percussion (tracks 1–4, 6 & 7)
- Lawrence Killian − congas, percussion (tracks 1–4, 6 & 7)
