= The Third World (album) =

Studio album by Gato Barbieri
- Released: 1970
- Recorded: November 24 & 25, 1969; New York City
- Genre: Avant-garde jazz, free jazz, latin jazz, world fusion
- Length: 39:30
- Label: Flying Dutchman FD 10117
- Producer: Bob Thiele

Gato Barbieri chronology
Confluence (1968)	The Third World (1970)	Fenix (1971)

The Third World is an album by Argentinian jazz composer and saxophonist Gato Barbieri featuring performances recorded in 1969 and first released on the Flying Dutchman label.

== Reception ==
Professional ratings
Review scores
Source	Rating
Allmusic	3/5 stars
The Penguin Guide to Jazz Recordings	3/4 stars

The Allmusic site awarded the album 3 stars stating "The Third World is the initial session that mixed Gato Barbieri's free jazz tenor playing with Latin and Brazilian influences. ...creating a danceable yet fiery combination of South American rhythms and free jazz forcefulnes".

== Track listing ==
1. "Introduction/Cancion del Llamero/Tango" (Gato Barbieri/Anastasio Quiroga/Astor Piazzolla) – 11:04
2. "Zelão" (Sérgio Ricardo) – 8:02
3. "Antonio das Mortes" (Barbieri) – 9:26
4. "Bachianas Brasileiras/Haleo and the Wild Rose" (Heitor Villa-Lobos/Dollar Brand) – 10:58

== Personnel ==
- Gato Barbieri – tenor saxophone, flute, vocals
- Roswell Rudd – trombone
- Lonnie Liston Smith – piano
- Charlie Haden – bass
- Beaver Harris – drums
- Richard Landrum – percussion
