= Under Fire (album) =

Studio album by Gato Barbieri
- Released: 1973
- Recorded: 1971; New York City
- Genre: Jazz
- Length: 35:19
- Label: Flying Dutchman FD 10156
- Producer: Bob Thiele

Gato Barbieri chronology
El Pampero (1971)	Under Fire (1973)	Last Tango in Paris (1972)

Under Fire is an album by Argentinian jazz composer and saxophonist Gato Barbieri featuring performances recorded in New York in 1971 and first released on the Flying Dutchman label in 1973.

== Reception ==
Professional ratings
Review scores
Source	Rating
AllMusic	3/5 stars
The Penguin Guide to Jazz Recordings	3.5/4 stars

AllMusic awarded the album 3 stars stating "Under Fire is Gato Barbieri in his early-'70s prime, when the Argentinean tenorman's transition from the avant-garde to exploring his South American continental routes still hadn't passed beyond the pale into flaccid fusion".

== Track listing ==
1. "El Parana" (Gato Barbieri) – 8:58
2. " Yo le Canto a la Luna" (Atahualpa Yupanqui) – 4:49
3. "Antonico" (Ismael Silva) – 3:48
4. "Maria Domingas" (Jorge Ben) – 9:28
5. "El Sertao" (Gato Barbieri, Sérgio Ricardo) – 8:16

== Personnel ==
- Gato Barbieri – tenor saxophone, vocals
- Lonnie Liston Smith – piano, electric piano
- John Abercrombie – guitar, electric guitar
- Stanley Clarke – bass
- Roy Haynes – drums
- James Mtume – congas
- Airto Moreira – percussion, drums
- Moulay Ali Hafid – percussion
