= Stolen Moments (Oliver Nelson album) =

Studio album by Oliver Nelson
- Released: 1975
- Recorded: March 6, 1975
- Studio: TTG Studios, Los Angeles, CA
- Genre: Jazz
- Label: East Wind EW-8014
- Producer: Oliver Nelson

Oliver Nelson chronology
Skull Session (1975)	Stolen Moments (1975)

Stolen Moments is the final studio album by American jazz saxophonist, composer and arranger Oliver Nelson, featuring performances recorded in 1975 for the East Wind label.

== Reception ==
Professional ratings
Review scores
Source	Rating
Allmusic	3.5/5 stars
The Rolling Stone Jazz Record Guide	3/5 stars
DownBeat	4/5 stars

The Allmusic site awarded the album 3½ stars, calling it: "A fine finish to a much-too-brief life".

DownBeat awarded 4 stars. Reviewer Jack Sohmer wrote, "The primary emphasis here is on the blues, both minor and major, and even the modal Mission is not completely devoid of this feeling. Nelson’s own playing has always deserved much more attention than it received. His sound is a singing one, richly expressive and well rounded. And while his ideas find their origin in mainstream swing/bop, few can accuse him of standing still".

== Track listing ==
All compositions by Oliver Nelson except as indicated

1. "Stolen Moments" - 7:46
2. "St. Thomas" (Sonny Rollins) - 3:57
3. "Three Seconds" - 6:27
4. "Mission Accomplished" - 6:30
5. "Midnight Blue" (Neal Hefti) - 4:10
6. "Yearnin'" - 6:23
7. "Straight, No Chaser" (Thelonious Monk) - 0:38

== Personnel ==
- Oliver Nelson - alto saxophone, arranger, conductor
- Bobby Bryant - trumpet, flugelhorn
- Jerome Richardson - soprano saxophone, piccolo, flute
- Bobby Bryant Jr., Buddy Collette - tenor saxophone, flute
- Jack Nimitz - baritone saxophone
- Mike Wofford - electric piano, piano
- Chuck Domanico - electric bass
- Shelly Manne - drums
- Freddie Hubbard - trumpet
