= Reflections of a Golden Dream =

Studio album by Lonnie Liston Smith & The Cosmic Echoes
- Released: 1976
- Recorded: September 1976
- Studio: Mediasound, New York City
- Genre: Jazz, soul jazz
- Length: 38:51
- Label: RCA/Flying Dutchman; BDL1-1460
- Producer: Bob Thiele, Lonnie Liston Smith

Lonnie Liston Smith chronology
Visions of a New World (1975)	Reflections of a Golden Dream (1976)	Live! (1977)

Reflections of a Golden Dream is an album by keyboardist Lonnie Liston Smith, featuring performances recorded in 1976 and released by the Flying Dutchman label the following year.

== Reception ==
Professional ratings
Review scores
Source	Rating
AllMusic	3/5 stars

In his review for AllMusic, Steven Thomas Erlewine stated, "he already struck upon a blend of the spiritual and funk with 1975's Expansions. Released a year later, Reflections of a Golden Dream tips the scales a bit closer to funk ... After this Reflections starts to seem as meditative as its title, achieving a kind of elegant spiritual suspension while also feeling as fleet and slick as satin ... and while the rest of the record contains many period accouterments -- sustained strings, electric pianos, deep echoes -- the essence of the record is indeed meditative. Perhaps these are polyester paisley dreams but that doesn't make them any less real or affecting".

== Track listing ==
All compositions by Lonnie Liston Smith

1. "Get Down Everybody (It's Time for World Peace)" − 4:23
2. "Quiet Dawn" − 3:31
3. "Sunbeams" − 3:53
4. "Meditations" − 4:22
5. "Peace & Love" − 2:39
6. "Beautiful Woman" − 6:04
7. "Goddess of Love" − 4:23
8. "Inner Beauty" − 2:17
9. "Golden Dreams" − 4:49
10. "Journey into Space" − 2:30

== Personnel ==
- Lonnie Liston Smith − electric piano, classical piano, electronic colorations, vocals
- Donald Smith − flute, vocals (tracks 2, 3 & 5–9)
- Leopoldo Fleming − congas, percussion, vocals, piano
- Joe Shepley, Jon Faddis − trumpet, flugelhorn (tracks 1 & 5)
- David Hubbard − soprano saxophone, tenor saxophone, flute (tracks 1–3 & 5–9)
- George Opalisky − tenor saxophone (tracks 1 & 5)
- Arthur Kaplan − baritone saxophone (tracks 1 & 5)
- Al Anderson − bass (tracks 1–3, 5–7 & 9)
- Wilby Fletcher − drums (tracks 1–3, 5–7 & 9)
- Guilherme Franco − percussion (tracks 1–9)
- Maeretha Stewart, Patti Austin, Vivian Cherry − chorus (tracks 1 & 5)
- Horace Ott − percussion arrangement (track 5)
- Cosmic Beings − other (track 10)
