= El Pampero =

Live album by Gato Barbieri
- Released: 1971
- Recorded: June 1971; Montreux Jazz Festival, Montreux, Switzerland
- Genre: Jazz
- Length: 41:40
- Label: Flying Dutchman FD 10151
- Producer: Bob Thiele

Gato Barbieri chronology
Fenix (1971)	El Pampero (1971)	Under Fire (1971)

El Pampero is a live album by Argentinian jazz composer and saxophonist Gato Barbieri featuring performances recorded at the Montreux Jazz Festival in 1971 and first released on the Flying Dutchman label.

== Reception ==
Professional ratings
Review scores
Source	Rating
Allmusic	4/5 stars
The Penguin Guide to Jazz Recordings	4/4 stars

The Allmusic site awarded the album 4 stars stating "Gato Barbieri leads his fantastic group of musical friends with hurricane-like flair on his tenor sax. At times surreal and mind-boggling, Barbieri shows just how far one can let the music go to break the borders of jazz, sending his music into fresh and uncharted territory".

== Track listing ==
1. "El Pampero" - 13:44
2. "Mi Buenos Aires Querido" (Carlos Gardel, Alfredo Le Pera) - 6:21
3. "Brasil" (Aldo Cabral, Benedito Lacerda, Pedro Berrios) - 9:36
4. "El Arriero" (Atahualpa Yupanqui) - 11:59

== Personnel ==
- Gato Barbieri - tenor saxophone, arranger
- Lonnie Liston Smith - piano
- Chuck Rainey - electric bass
- Bernard Purdie - drums
- Sonny Morgan - congas
- Naná Vasconcelos - berimbau, percussion
