= Turn This Mutha Out =

Studio album by Idris Muhammad
- Released: 1977
- Recorded: December 1976–February 1977
- Genre: Jazz funk; disco
- Length: 37:14
- Label: Kudu
- Producer: David Matthews

Idris Muhammad chronology
House of the Rising Sun (1976)	Turn This Mutha Out (1977)	You Ain't No Friend of Mine (1978)

Turn This Mutha Out is a 1977 album by Idris Muhammad. Produced and arranged by CTI/Kudu staff arranger David Matthews, it was aimed more at the R&B/disco market than the jazz market. One of only a few Kudu albums not produced by label owner Creed Taylor, Turn This Mutha Out spawned two pop and R&B hits, the title track and "Could Heaven Ever Be Like This".

== Critical reception ==
Professional ratings
Review scores
Source	Rating
AllMusic	3.5/5 stars
The Rolling Stone Jazz Record Guide	2/5 stars

The Bay State Banner wrote that "Muhammad is another jazz artist who has succumbed to the lure of money via the disco sound."

== Track listing ==
1. "Could Heaven Ever Be Like This" (David Matthews, Tony Sarafino) – 8:37
2. "Camby Bolongo" (Matthews) – 3:50
3. "Turn This Mutha Out" (Matthews, Sarafino) – 6:50
4. "Tasty Cakes" (Matthews, Sarafino) – 4:23
5. "Crab Apple" (Matthews) – 5:07
6. "Moon Hymn" (Matthews) – 4:22
7. "Say What" (Matthews) – 4:05

== Track credits ==
1. Could Heaven Ever Be Like This

- Idris Muhammad — drums, tom tom
- Wilbur Bascomb — bass
- Hiram Bullock — guitar solo
- Charlie Brown — guitar
- Rubens Bassini — percussion
- Sue Evans — percussion
- Michael Brecker — tenor saxophone solo
- Ronnie Cuber — baritone saxophone
- David Tofani — soprano saxophone
- Clifford Carter — synthesizer solo
- Randy Brecker — trumpet
- Jon Faddis — trumpet
- Margaret Ross — harp
- Frank Floyd — vocal solo
- Bill Eaton — background vocals
- Zachary Sanders — background vocals
- Ray Simpson — background vocals

2. Camby Bolongo

- Idris Muhammad — drums, tom tom
- Wilbur Bascomb — bass
- Charlie Brown — guitar
- Hugh McCracken — guitar
- Sue Evans — percussion
- Randy Brecker — trumpet solo
- Jeremy Steig — flute solo

3. Turn This Mutha Out

- Idris Muhammad — drums, tom tom
- Wilbur Bascomb — bass
- Clifford Carter — keyboards
- Hiram Bullock — guitar solo
- Sue Evans — percussion
- Bill Eaton — background vocals
- Zachary Sanders — background vocals
- Ray Simpson — background vocals

4. Tasty Cakes

- Idris Muhammad — drums, tom tom
- Wilbur Bascomb — bass
- Clifford Carter — keyboards
- Hiram Bullock — guitar solo
- Sue Evans — percussion
- Bill Eaton — background vocals
- Zachary Sanders — background vocals
- Ray Simpson — background vocals

5. Crab Apple

- Idris Muhammad — drums, tom tom
- Wilbur Bascomb — bass
- Charlie Brown — guitar
- Hiram Bullock — guitar solo
- Sue Evans — percussion
- Ronnie Cuber — baritone saxophone
- David Tofani — soprano saxophone
- Clifford Carter — synthesizer solo
- Michael Brecker — tenor saxophone solo

6. Moon Hymn

- Idris Muhammad — drums, tom tom
- Wilbur Bascomb —bass
- Charlie Brown —guitar
- Sue Evans —percussion
- Ronnie Cuber —baritone saxophone
- David Tofani —soprano saxophone
- Clifford Carter — synthesizer

7. Say What

- Idris Muhammad — drums, tom tom
- Wilbur Bascomb — bass
- Charlie Brown — guitar
- Hugh McCracken — guitar
- Eric Gale — guitar solo
- Jeremy Steig — flute solo

== Later Samples ==
- "Crab Apple"
  - "Crooked Ass Nigga" by 2Pac from the album 2Pacalypse Now
- "Say What"
  - "Dr. Knockboots" by Nas from the album I Am...
- "Could Heaven Ever Be Like This"
  - "Rise (Bini & Martini Mix)" by Soul Providers
  - "Loud Places" by Jamie xx feat. Romy
  - "Marijuana" by Chrome Sparks
  - "Terrorise the City" by Klashnekoff ft Kool G Rap and Kyza
  - "Alright" by Jamiroquai
