= Live! (Lonnie Liston Smith album) =

Live album by Lonnie Liston Smith
- Released: 1977
- Recorded: May 19, 20 & 21, 1977
- Venue: Smucker's Cabaret, Brooklyn
- Genre: Jazz, soul jazz
- Length: 44:13
- Label: RCA Victor; APL1-2433
- Producer: Bob Thiele

Lonnie Liston Smith chronology
Reflections of a Golden Dream (1976)	Live! (1977)	Renaissance (1977)

Live! is a live album by keyboardist Lonnie Liston Smith, featuring performances recorded in Brooklyn in 1977 and released by the RCA Victor label.

== Reception ==
Professional ratings
Review scores
Source	Rating
AllMusic	4.5/5 stars

In his review for AllMusic, Alex Henderson stated, "this superb LP is the only live album that Lonnie Liston Smith provided in the 1970s. It's also one of the most essential and improvisatory recordings he ever came out with. Smith and his band, the Cosmic Echoes, don't hesitate to let loose during this performance ... Though the Cosmic Echoes maintain their ethereal qualities, their playing definitely has a tougher edge on stage".

== Track listing ==
All compositions by Lonnie Liston Smith

1. "Sorceress" – 6:01
2. "Prelude" – 2:58
3. "Expansions" – 8:30
4. "My Love" – 4:45
5. "Visions of a New World (Phase One)" – 2:21
6. "Visions of a New World (Phase Two)" – 6:17
7. "Watercolors" – 4:51
8. "Sunset" – 8:30

== Personnel ==
- Lonnie Liston Smith − piano, clavinet, ARP synthesizer, Fender Rhodes electric piano
- Donald Smith − vocals, flute
- Dave Hubbard − soprano saxophone, tenor saxophone
- Ronald D. Miller – guitar
- Al Anderson – bass
- Hollywood Barker – drums
- Michael Carvin – percussion
