= Human Music =

Studio album by Jon Appleton & Don Cherry
- Released: 1970
- Recorded: 1969–70; Bregman Electronic Music Studio at Dartmouth College in Hanover, NH
- Genres: Electronic music, jazz
- Length: 41:28
- Label: Flying Dutchman FDS 121
- Producer: Rufe Davis

Jon Appleton chronology
| Appleton Syntonic Menagerie (1969) | Human Music (1970) | The World Music Theatre of Jon Appleton (1974) |

Don Cherry chronology
| Live in Ankara (1969) | Human Music (1970) | Orient (1971) |

Human Music is a studio album by American electronic music composer Jon Appleton and multi-instrumentalist Don Cherry featuring performances recorded in 1969 and 1970 and first released on the Flying Dutchman label.

== Reception ==
Professional ratings
Review scores
| Source | Rating |
|---|---|
| AllMusic | 3/5 stars |
| The Penguin Guide to Jazz Recordings | 3.5/4 stars |

The album received a Swing Journal award in 1971.

The AllMusic site awarded the album 3 stars.

The authors of The Penguin Guide to Jazz Recordings wrote: "Ahead of its time and inevitably neglected on first... release, electronics man Jon Appleton imaginatively processes Cherry's trumpet and flute sounds."

== Track listing ==
All compositions by Jon Appleton and Don Cherry

1. "BOA" - 13:15
2. "OBA" - 7:30
3. "ABO" - 11:00
4. "BAO" - 9:43

== Personnel ==
- Jon Appleton - synthesizer, electronics
- Don Cherry - flute, wood flute, bamboo flute, kalimba, earthquake drums, cornet with traditional mouthpiece and bassoon reed
