= Jewels of Thought =

Studio album by Pharoah Sanders
- Released: 1969
- Recorded: October 20, 1969
- Genre: Jazz
- Length: 42:55
- Label: Impulse!
- Producer: Ed Michel

Pharoah Sanders chronology
Karma (1969)	Jewels of Thought (1969)	Deaf Dumb Blind (Summun Bukmun Umyun) (1970)

Jewels of Thought is an album by the American jazz saxophonist Pharoah Sanders. It was recorded at Plaza Sound Studios in New York City on October 20, 1969, and was released on Impulse! Records in the same year. The 1998 reissue merged "Sun In Aquarius" into one 27-minute-long track.

== Reception ==
Professional ratings
Review scores
Source	Rating
AllMusic	4/5 stars
The Penguin Guide to Jazz Recordings	2/4 stars
Pitchfork	7.8/10
The Rolling Stone Jazz & Blues Album Guide	3/5 stars

In a review for AllMusic, Thom Jurek wrote: "Jewels of Thought sees Sanders moving out from his signature tenor for the first time and delving deeply into reed flutes and bass clarinet. The plethora of percussion instruments utilized by everyone is, as expected, part of the mix..." Regarding "Sun in Aquarius", Jurek commented: "It's more like a finished exorcism... but it is one of the most astonishing pieces by Sanders ever."

Regarding "Hum-Allah-Hum-Allah-Hum-Allah", Daniel Martin-McCormick, in a review for Pitchfork, commented: "By allowing soulful prettiness alongside more vicious passages, Sanders opens the album up, connecting the dots between joyful communion and unflinching catharsis. A squalling solo toward the end of the side sounds like a cry from the deepest, most tortured part of his soul, but it's supported by an unerringly mellow piano accompaniment... It's a moment of deep vulnerability in a genre can often devolve into macho blowing contests." Martin-McCormick stated that "Sun in Aquarius" "yawns out like a terrifying chasm before letting Lonnie Liston Smith's piano boil over for the better part of five minutes. Sanders is in devastating form, screaming through his tenor. Even after a mid-side comedown and a breathtaking bass duet from Cecil McBee and Richard Davis, he leaps back in undeterred, firing out one of his heaviest solos like a machine gun."

Writing for Treblezine, Jeff Terich remarked: "Jewels of Thought... heightens the juxtaposition of Sanders' more mellifluous compositions against his most radical. Its first side, 'Hum-Allah-Hum-Allah-Hum-Allah,' begins with a plea for peace and a vocal delivery from Leon Thomas that's nearly as far-out as Sanders' saxophone is on its flipside. Yet ultimately this composition—a soulful call for understanding and love—is among Sanders' most hypnotic grooves, a breathtaking 15 minutes driven largely by Lonnie Liston Smith's stunning piano. The two-part 'Sun In Aquarius,' by comparison, is a furious exploration of dissonance and abrasion. Its first movement is darkly atmospheric, driven by Smith's menacing stabs of piano, a far cry from his glorious chords from 'Hum-Allah.' Yet the second half undergoes a thrilling transformation from free-jazz screech back to soul-jazz transcendence and eventually some strange hybrid of the two. It's not Sanders' most immediate composition, though as one of his most challenging it warrants revisiting and reexamining."

In a review for Aquarium Drunkard, M. Garner wrote: "Smith's playing is bright, easy, lyrical, and, perhaps most importantly given the level of questing going on around it, familiar. On... 'Hum-Allah-Hum-Allah-Hum-Allah,' he gives Sanders a spruced-up base from which to launch, but Sanders seems just as happy to follow his pianist. The two play around one another cheerfully, each occasionally departing to take a solo trip through the sky before returning to the ground. Around them, the song develops with the same natural grace. Even as Sanders trills and Roy Haynes and Idris Muhammad count out counter-rhythms, a feeling of mutual wonder permeates the playing."

== Track listing ==
1. "Hum-Allah-Hum-Allah-Hum-Allah" (music: P. Sanders, L. Smith, Jr., lyrics: Amosis Leontopolis Thomas) – 15:04
2. "Sun in Aquarius (Part I)" (music: P. Sanders, L. Smith, Jr.) – 8:22
3. "Sun in Aquarius (Part II)" (music: P. Sanders, L. Smith, Jr.) – 19:56

== Personnel ==
- Pharoah Sanders – tenor saxophone, contrabass clarinet, reed flute, kalimba, orchestra chimes, percussion
- Leon Thomas – vocals, percussion
- Lonnie Liston Smith – piano, African flute, kalimba, percussion
- Cecil McBee – bass, percussion
- Richard Davis – bass, percussion (tracks 2–3, left channel)
- Idris Muhammad – drums, percussion
- Roy Haynes – drums (track 1, right channel)
