= Power of Soul (album) =

Studio album by Idris Muhammad
- Released: June 1974
- Recorded: March 1974
- Studio: Van Gelder, Englewood Cliffs, NJ
- Genre: Jazz, jazz-funk
- Length: 34:20
- Label: Kudu
- Producer: Creed Taylor

Idris Muhammad chronology
Peace and Rhythm (1971)	Power of Soul (1974)	House of the Rising Sun (1976)

Power of Soul is the third studio album by American jazz drummer Idris Muhammad, released in November 1974.

== Reception ==
Professional ratings
Review scores
Source	Rating
AllMusic	5/5 stars
DownBeat	3/5 stars
The Rolling Stone Jazz Record Guide	3/5 stars

Thom Jurek of AllMusic said that the album "is one of the reasons that Idris Muhammad is regarded as the drumming king of groove".

== Track listing ==
All compositions arranged and conducted by Bob James

No.	Title	Writer(s)	Length
1.	"Power of Soul"	Jimi Hendrix	7:07
2.	"Piece of Mind"	Bob James	9:24
3.	"The Saddest Thing"	Joe Beck	7:10
4.	"Loran's Dance"	Grover Washington Jr.	10:39
Total length:			34:20

== Personnel ==
- Idris Muhammad – drums
- Randy Brecker – trumpet, flugelhorn
- Grover Washington Jr. – tenor and soprano saxophone
- Bob James – Fender Rhodes, keyboards
- Joe Beck – guitar
- Gary King – bass
- Ralph MacDonald – percussion
