= Visions of a New World =

Studio album by Lonnie Liston Smith & The Cosmic Echoes
- Released: 1975
- Recorded: July 18 & 20, 1975
- Studio: Electric Lady Studios, New York City
- Genre: Jazz-funk
- Length: 33:53
- Label: RCA/Flying Dutchman; BDL1-1196
- Producer: Bob Thiele, Lonnie Liston Smith

Lonnie Liston Smith chronology
Expansions (1975)	Visions of a New World (1975)	Reflections of a Golden Dream (1976)

Visions of a New World is an album by keyboardist Lonnie Liston Smith, featuring performances recorded in 1975 and released by the Flying Dutchman label.

== Reception ==
Professional ratings
Review scores
Source	Rating
AllMusic	3/5 stars

In his review for AllMusic, Thom Jurek stated, "On Visions of a New World, Smith, accompanied by his working unit the Cosmic Echoes, digs deeper into the soul-jazz vein that he had begun exploring ... In 1975, Smith was looking for a smoother, more soulful groove than he had displayed previously ... Despite these fiery players, the music here is strictly a late-night seduction/meditation groove ... Not exactly a flawless bid for Smith, but there are some shining moments nonetheless".

== Track listing ==
All compositions by Lonnie Liston Smith except where noted

1. "A Chance for Peace" − 5:18
2. "Love Beams" − 4:07
3. "Colors of the Rainbow" (Pharoah Sanders, Leon Thomas; credited to Lonnie Liston Smith) − 3:45
4. "Devika (Goddess)" (Dave Hubbard) − 5:17
5. "Sunset" − 4:10
6. "Visions of a New World (Phase I)" − 2:08
7. "Visions of a New World (Phase II)" − 3:40
8. "Summer Nights" − 5:05

== Personnel ==
- Lonnie Liston Smith − keyboards
- Donald Smith − vocals, flute (tracks 1–3, 5, 6 & 8)
- Cecil Bridgewater − trumpet (tracks 1 & 7)
- Clifford Adams − trombone (tracks 1 & 7)
- Dave Hubbard − soprano saxophone, horns (tracks 1, 2, 4, 5 & 8)
- Reggie Lucas − guitar (tracks 1 & 7)
- Greg Maker − electric bass (tracks 1, 2, 4, 5, 7 & 8)
- Art Gore, Wilby Fletcher − drums (tracks 1, 2, 4, 5, 7 & 8)
- Lawrence Killian − congas, percussion (tracks 1, 2, 4, 5, 7 & 8)
- Angel Allende − bongos, percussion (tracks 1–5, 7 & 8)
- Michael Carvin (tracks 1, 2, 4, 5, 7 & 8), Ray Armando (tracks 1–5, 7 & 8) − percussion
