= Black Rhythm Revolution! =

Studio album by Idris Muhammad
- Released: 1971
- Recorded: November 2, 1970
- Studio: Van Gelder, Englewood Cliffs
- Genre: Jazz
- Label: Prestige; PR 10005
- Producer: Bob Porter

Idris Muhammad chronology
Black Rhythm Revolution! (1971)	Peace and Rhythm (1971)

Black Rhythm Revolution! is the first album by the jazz drummer Idris Muhammad. It was recorded in 1970 and released by Prestige Records the following year.

== Reception ==
Professional ratings
Review scores
Source	Rating
AllMusic	3/5 stars
DownBeat	3/5 stars
The Encyclopedia of Popular Music	2/5 stars
The Rolling Stone Jazz Record Guide	2/5 stars

Stewart Mason of AllMusic wrote: "Black Rhythm Revolution is not a bad album at all; in fact, most of the tracks are good to great, with the lengthy bookends 'By the Red Sea' and 'Wander' both featuring memorable grooves and tight, compact solos. It's just considerably less intense than the title might lead one to believe." The DownBeat reviewer of the album's 2023 re-release wrote that it "features the rarely recognised funkier side of the jazz–fusion genre".

== Track listing ==
All compositions by Idris Muhammad except where noted.

1. "Express Yourself" (Charles Wright) – 5:28
2. "Soulful Drums" (Jack McDuff) – 4:42
3. "Super Bad" (James Brown) – 5:31
4. "Wander" – 11:11
5. "By the Red Sea" – 8:56

== Personnel ==
- Idris Muhammad – drums
- Virgil Jones – trumpet
- Clarence Thomas – tenor saxophone, soprano saxophone
- Harold Mabern – electric piano
- Melvin Sparks – guitar
- Jimmy Lewis – electric bass
- Buddy Caldwell – congas

Production

- Bob Porter – producer
- Rudy Van Gelder – engineer
