= Peace and Rhythm =

Studio album by Idris Muhammad
- Released: 1971
- Recorded: September 13 & 20, 1971
- Studio: Van Gelder, Englewood Cliffs, NJ
- Genre: Jazz
- Label: Prestige; PR 10036
- Producer: Bob Porter

Idris Muhammad chronology
Black Rhythm Revolution! (1970)	Peace and Rhythm (1971)	Power of Soul (1974)

Peace and Rhythm is the second album led by jazz drummer Idris Muhammad, recorded for the Prestige label in 1971.

== Reception ==
Professional ratings
Review scores
Source	Rating
AllMusic	3/5 stars
The Rolling Stone Jazz Record Guide	3/5 stars

AllMusic stated, "Parts of the second solo album by Prestige Records' house drummer, Idris Muhammad, are an even poppier affair than Black Rhythm Revolution, with a mellow soul-jazz feel replacing the slight Latin tinge of the earlier album... 'The Peace and Rhythm Suite' is a side-long suite consisting of two long, spacy compositions that predate the ambient house scene by nearly two decades yet sound entirely of a piece with that style. Long, droning, sustained chords on a variety of wind and reed instruments float above Muhammad's percussion, which ebbs and flows in a free, almost arrhythmic way through most of the piece. Fans of The Orb or Brian Eno will find it an old hat, but for early-'70s jazz, this was downright revolutionary".

== Track listing ==
All compositions by Idris Muhammad except where noted

1. "Peace and Rhythm Suite: Peace" – 12:05
2. "Peace and Rhythm Suite: Rhythm" (Clarence Thomas) – 5:55
3. "Brother You Know You're Doing Wrong" (Sakinah Muhammad) – 5:40
4. "Don't Knock My Love" (Brad Shapiro, Wilson Pickett) – 4:45
5. "I'm A Believer" (Sakinah Muhammad) – 5:20
- Recorded at Van Gelder Studio in Englewood Cliffs, New Jersey, on September 13 (tracks 3–5) and September 20 (tracks 1 & 2), 1971

== Personnel ==
- Idris Muhammad – drums, gong, cowbell, cabasa, autohorn
- Virgil Jones – trumpet
- Clarence Thomas – tenor saxophone, soprano saxophone, flute, bells, arranger
- William Bivens – vibraphone (tracks 1 & 2)
- Alan Fontaine, Melvin Sparks – guitar (tracks 3–5)
- Kenny Barron – electric piano (tracks 1 & 2)
- Ron Carter – bass (tracks 1 & 2)
- Jimmy Lewis – electric bass (tracks 3–5)
- Buddy Caldwell – congas
- Angel Allende – percussion, timbales (tracks 1 & 2)
- Sakinah Muhammad – vocals (tracks 3 & 5)

=== Production ===
- Bob Porter – producer
- Rudy Van Gelder – engineer
