= Cosmic Funk =

Studio album by Lonnie Liston Smith & The Cosmic Echoes
- Released: 1974
- Recorded: April 1974
- Studio: New York City
- Genre: Jazz-funk
- Length: 35:41
- Label: RCA/Flying Dutchman; BDL 1-0591
- Producer: Bob Thiele

Lonnie Liston Smith chronology
Astral Traveling (1973)	Cosmic Funk (1974)	Expansions (1975)

Cosmic Funk is an album by keyboardist Lonnie Liston Smith, featuring performances recorded in 1974 and released by the Flying Dutchman label.

Jason Heller, in Strange Stars: How Science Fiction and Fantasy Transformed Popular Music, pointed to the title track as an example of "sci-fi funk."

== Reception ==
Professional ratings
Review scores
Source	Rating
AllMusic	3/5 stars
The Encyclopedia of Popular Music	4/5 stars

In his review for AllMusic, Stephen Thomas Erlewine stated, "it's a record where the good ideas are sometimes suggested rather than developed. ... That opening song is one of the few tracks that emphasizes funk, otherwise the cosmic reigns, as the group usually getting spacy all the while never quite leaving the earth. ... the album is distinguished by the spaces that lie between funk and bop, the periods where Smith and company start to float, then pull themselves back."

Record Collector called the album "funky spiritual jazz."

== Track listing ==
All compositions by Lonnie Liston Smith except where noted

1. "Cosmic Funk" − 5:35
2. "Footprints" (Wayne Shorter) − 6:08
3. "Beautiful Woman" − 6:57
4. "Sais (Egypt)" (James Mtume) − 8:15
5. "Peaceful Ones" − 5:03
6. "Naima" (John Coltrane) − 4:02

== Personnel ==
- Lonnie Liston Smith − piano, electric piano, percussion
- Donald Smith − vocals, flute, piano
- George Barron − soprano saxophone, flute, percussion
- Al Anderson − electric bass
- Art Gore − drums
- Lawrence Killian − congas, percussion
- Andrew Cyrille, Doug Hammond, Ron Bridgewater − percussion
