= Astral Traveling =

Studio album by Lonnie Liston Smith & The Cosmic Echoes
- Released: 1973
- Recorded: 1973
- Studio: New York City
- Genre: Spiritual jazz
- Length: 39:12
- Label: Flying Dutchman; FD-10163
- Producer: Bob Thiele

Lonnie Liston Smith chronology
Astral Traveling (1973)	Cosmic Funk (1974)

Astral Traveling is the debut album by keyboardist Lonnie Liston Smith, featuring performances recorded in 1973 and released by the Flying Dutchman label.

== Reception ==
Professional ratings
Review scores
Source	Rating
AllMusic	4.5/5 stars

Reviewer Alex Henderson stated on AllMusic " this LP leaves no doubt that the improviser is very much his own man and has a wealth of brilliant ideas of his own; thankfully, he has a cohesive band to help him carry them out ... Astral Traveling is among Smith's most essential and rewarding albums".

== Track listing ==
All compositions by Lonnie Liston Smith

1. "Astral Traveling" − 5:30
2. "Let Us Go Into the House of the Lord" − 6:30
3. "Rejuvenation" − 5:50
4. "I Mani (Faith)" − 6:10
5. "In Search of Truth" − 7:04
6. "Aspirations" − 4:20

== Personnel ==
- Lonnie Liston Smith − piano, electric piano
- George Barron − soprano saxophone, tenor saxophone
- Joe Beck − guitar
- Cecil McBee − bass
- David Lee Jr. − drums
- James Mtume, Sonny Morgan − congas, percussion
- Badal Roy − tabla
- Geeta Vashi − tamboura
