= Willard S. Bain =

American writer

Informed Sources links here, for the political discussion show see WYES-TV#Original programming

Willard S. Bain (May 4, 1938 – December 2, 2000) was an American writer.

== Early life and education ==
Born Willard Slocum Bain Jr. in San Antonio, Texas, where his father was the president of the Mid-Texas Telephone Company, he graduated from Alamo Heights High School in 1956 and enrolled in Reed College in Oregon, where he married his classmate Linda Logan in 1959 and graduated in 1960 with a BA in literature.

== Career ==
After college he worked on the Desert Dispatch in Barstow, California before relocating to San Francisco where he worked for the Associated Press news wire service and collaborated with his former Reed classmate Jon Appleton writing musical comedies.

In March 1967 his novel Informed Sources: Day East Received, a satirical allegory of the assassination of John F. Kennedy in the form of fictional news wire bulletins, was distributed in an edition of about 500 mimeographed copies by Chester Anderson and Claude Hayward's hippie news bureau, the Communications Company, which distributed daily (and sometimes hourly) broadsides on the streets of the Haight-Ashbury district before and during the Summer of Love. Informed Sources was reissued by Doubleday in 1969, and in England by Faber in 1970 (ISBN 9780571092345). The book was critically well-received. Lawrence Lipton in the Los Angeles Free Press wrote: "The author, whoever he is, is the master arsonist of ideas, a light-bringer as well as a fire-bringer. This book may turn out to be the first major work of the hip era in writing.". However, J.B. Post, writing in science-fiction fanzine Luna was less convinced: "It is one of those soon to be forgotten works that reek with private jokes and pseudo-profundities."

Bain opened a bookstore called Paper Ships in Corte Madera, California in 1970.
