= Theremin Center =

Interdisciplinary research center in Moscow, Russia

The Theremin Center for Electroacoustic Music was created in Moscow, Russia in 1992 by the group of musicians and computer scientists, under the leadership of Andrey Smirnov. It was named for Leon Theremin - Russian inventor of the Theremin, one of the first widely used electronic musical instruments. The Theremin Center aims to achieve a co-operation of musicians, artists, scientists, and technologists who are oriented toward realization of experimental artistic projects. From the start the Theremin Center was intended to operate on a non-profit basis and most services and equipment were donated by the founders and sponsors of the Theremin Center.

== See also ==
- Teen Age Message#Theremin concert by Theremin Center performers Lydia Kavina, Yana Aksenova, and Anton Kerchenko for a series of interstellar radio transmissions sent to six star systems in 2001
