= Lonnie Liston Smith =

American jazz, soul, and funk musician (born 1940)

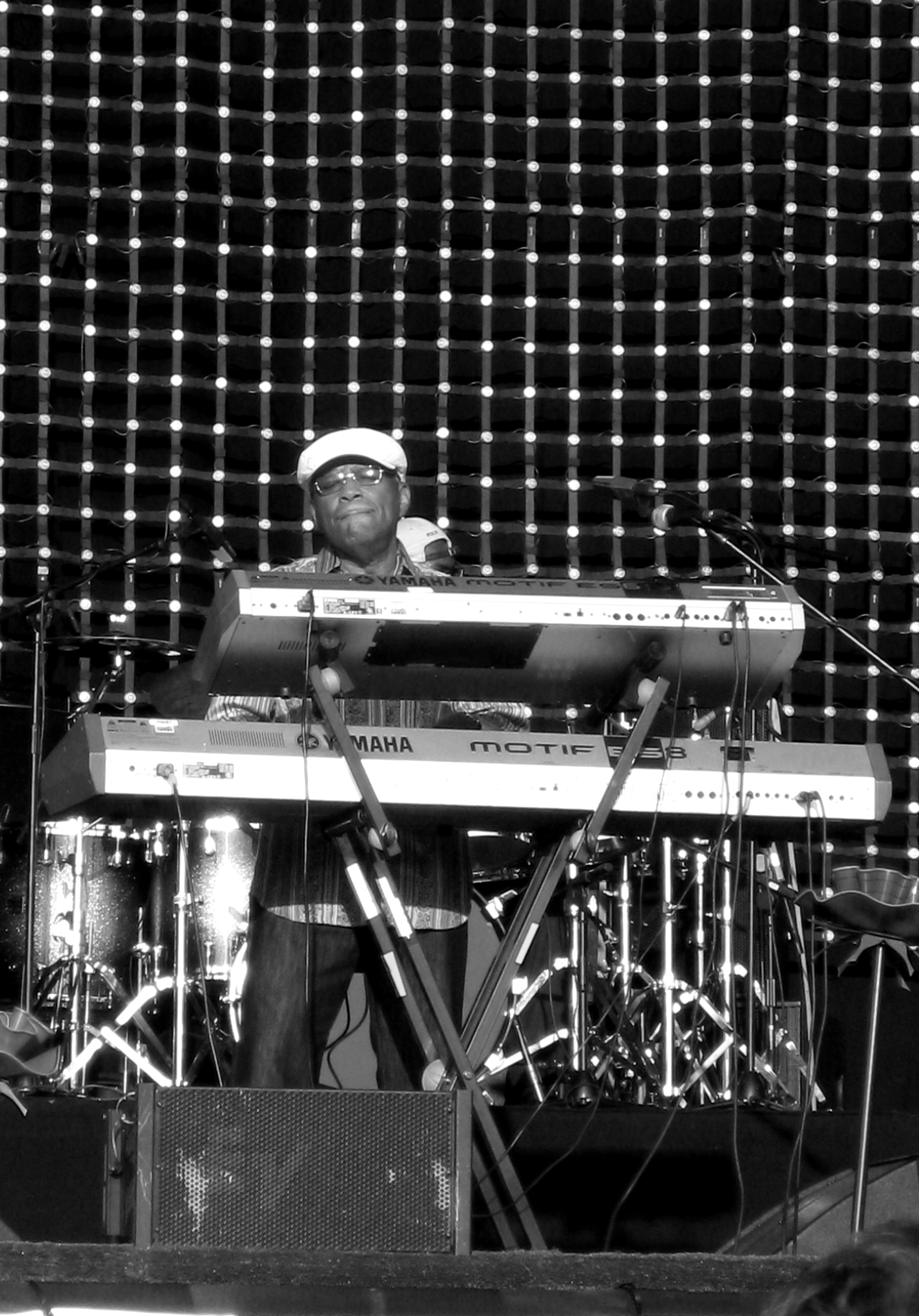
- Smith performing at Glastonbury in 2009

Background information
- Born: December 28, 1940 (age 85); Richmond, Virginia, U.S.
- Genres: Jazz; Soul; Funk
- Occupation: Musician
- Instruments: Piano; keyboards
- Years active: 1960s–present

Lonnie Liston Smith Jr. (born December 28, 1940) is an American jazz, soul, and funk pianist and keyboardist who played with such jazz artists as Pharoah Sanders and Miles Davis before forming Lonnie Liston Smith and the Cosmic Echoes, recording a number of albums widely regarded as classics in the fusion, smooth jazz, and acid jazz genres.

== Career ==
=== Early years (1963–73) ===
Smith was born and raised in Richmond, Virginia, United States to a musical family; his father was a member of Richmond Gospel music group The Harmonizing Four, and he remembered groups such as the Swan Silvertones and the Soul Stirrers (featuring a young Sam Cooke) as regular visitors to the house when he was a child. He studied piano, tuba and trumpet in high school and college before receiving a B.S. in music education from Morgan State University in Baltimore in 1961. Smith has cited Charlie Parker, John Coltrane and Miles Davis as major influences in his youth. While still a teenager, Smith became well known locally as a backing vocalist as well as pianist in the Baltimore metropolitan area. During this period, he regularly performed with a number of his contemporaries, including Gary Bartz (alto), Grachan Moncur (trombone), and Mickey Bass (bass). He also backed a number of jazz singers (including Ethel Ennis) while performing in the house band at Baltimore's Royal Theater shortly after receiving his degree.

In 1963, he moved to New York City, where he initially played piano in Betty Carter's band for a year. Early in 1965, Smith began playing with Roland Kirk, first recording with his band on Here Comes The Whistleman (Atlantic, 1965), an album recorded live in New York on March 14, 1965. A further track from that gig, "Dream", appeared on Roland Kirk and Al Hibbler's live album A Meeting of the Times (Atlantic, 1972).

Late in 1965, Smith joined Art Blakey's Jazz Messengers, sharing the piano position with Mike Nock and Keith Jarrett. The Jazz Messengers, together with Miles Davis' group, were one of the main proving grounds for young up-and-coming jazz musicians, experimentally edgy and musically stretching, and both were an ever-revolving door of young modern jazz musicians as modes and moods rapidly changed during a fresh period of experimentation. Beginning with a live session at The Five Spot, New York City, November 9, 1965, Smith's time as a Jazz Messenger was fairly short-term, only lasting until a three-gig engagement at The Village Vanguard 26–28 April 1966; by May 1966 his position was filled by Chick Corea. No recordings exist of this period.

In May 1967, Smith returned to working with Roland Kirk for the album sessions for Now Please Don't You Cry, Beautiful Edith (Verve, 1967) before continuing his career as pianist for a year with drummer Max Roach (although once again no recordings were made of this lineup).

Following this stint, Smith moved to Pharoah Sanders' ensemble early in 1968, a group Sanders had set up on the death of John Coltrane the previous year. Fiercely improvisational, Sanders pushed the band creatively to the boundaries of free jazz, recording three of Sanders' finest recordings: Karma (Impulse, 1969), Jewels of Thought (Impulse, 1970) and Thembi (Impulse, 1971), together with 1969 recording sessions not released until 1973 as Izipho Zam (Strata East, 1973). It is at this point that Smith began experimenting with electric keyboards:

On Thembi, that was the first time that I ever touched a Fender Rhodes electric piano. We got to the studio in California — Cecil McBee had to unpack his bass, the drummer had to set up his drums, Pharoah had to unpack all of his horns. Everybody had something to do, but the piano was just sitting there waiting. I saw this instrument sitting in the corner and I asked the engineer, 'What is that?' He said, 'That's a Fender Rhodes electric piano.' I didn't have anything to do, so I started messing with it, checking some of the buttons to see what I could do with different sounds. All of a sudden I started writing a song and everybody ran over and said, 'What is that?' And I said, 'I don't know, I'm just messing around.' Pharoah said, 'Man, we gotta record that. Whatcha gonna call it?' I'd been studying astral projections and it sounded like we were floating through space so I said let's call it 'Astral Traveling.' That’s how I got introduced to the electric piano.

During this period, Smith also backed Sanders' vocalist Leon Thomas on his first album Spirits Known and Unknown (Flying Dutchman, 1969).

Having already guested on Gato Barbieri's 1969 album The Third World (Philips, 1969), Smith joined Barbieri's band from 1971 to 1973. Barbieri had by then begun to temper his free jazz excursions of the 1960s with softer Afro-Cuban and South American textures in his music, which would influence Smith's playing into new directions in the following years. Smith played on a number of albums marking this transition, Fenix (Flying Dutchman, 1971), the live album El Pampero (Flying Dutchman, 1972), Under Fire (Flying Dutchman, 1973), and Bolivia (Flying Dutchman, 1973). One further album, El Gato (Flying Dutchman, 1975), was released after Smith had again moved on; from 1972 he had also taken up the invitation to join Miles Davis band on electric keyboards. Over the next year, during an intense period of studio recording by Davis, various line-ups laid down a considerable number of sessions, which were later inter-cut and remixed for final release. Miles Davis insisted that Smith learn to play the organ for the sessions: "Miles gave me two nights to learn how to make music on the thing. Miles liked to introduce new sounds in a surprising way — that's how he produced such innovative, fresh music." Smith's contributions appeared on On The Corner (Columbia, 1973) and the track "Ife" on Big Fun (Columbia, 1974).

=== The Cosmic Echoes and solo work (1973–85) ===
While passing through Miles Davis' ever-changing line-up, Smith had finally formed his own group, 'Lonnie Liston Smith and the Cosmic Echoes' in 1973, together with his partner in Pharoah Sanders group, Cecil McBee, on bass, George Barron (soprano and tenor sax), Joe Beck (guitar), David Lee Jr. (drums), James Mtume (percussion), Sonny Morgan (percussion), Badal Roy (tabla drums), and Geeta Vashi (tamboura). Blending atmospheric fusion, soul and funk, Smith was encouraged by Bob Thiele, the owner of Flying Dutchman Records, who had produced both Pharoah Sanders' and Gato Barbieri's output while Smith had been in their bands, the latter for Thiele's newly formed label. For his debut album, Astral Traveling (Flying Dutchman, 1973), Smith re-recorded the title song he had composed and played on with the Pharoah Sanders band two years previous. An instrumental album, Astral Travelling also contained a re-arrangement of the gospel standard Let Us Go Into the House of the Lord, which Smith had also previously arranged for Sanders.

I enjoyed the directness of this at first—piano improvisations striding over solid multi-percussion, in the spirit of Smith's former leader, Gato Barbieri, without the manic harshness. Then I begin to hanker for some harshness. It's not just the strings, which are at least as intelligent as, say, Alice Coltrane's, and less ubiquitous. It's also the rhythms themselves, serving a purpose so expanded and cosmic that it's not even spiritual anymore, thus rendering their connection to the body irrelevant.

— Review of Expansions by Robert Christgau (1981)

The following year Smith's brother, Donald, joined the Cosmic Echoes as vocalist for Cosmic Funk (Flying Dutchman, 1974). Although he remained close to his earlier roots with featured versions of Wayne Shorter's "Footprints" and John Coltrane's "Naima" on this album, by now Smith was heading into the smooth jazz funk/fusion style that would dominate his output from here on, with dreamy vocals and long, spacy instrumental passages underlaid by strong funky bass-lines and a distinctive use of light percussion, with a message of peace and tranquillity in both the lyrics and song titles. "I was trying to expand the consciousness of humanity" explained Smith in an interview in 2009.

This attitude may not have endeared Smith to the hardcore free jazz fans who had appreciated his earlier work, but this new relaxed fusion style proved popular with a cross-over audience not normally associated with jazz, and the following albums, Expansions (Flying Dutchman, 1974), Visions of a New World (Flying Dutchman, 1975) and Reflections of a Golden Dream (Flying Dutchman, 1976) have since become mainstays of the jazz-funk and chill jazz genres with DJs and audiences worldwide, especially in Europe and Japan. Renaissance (RCA, 1977) continued this crossover fame, and the following year Smith expanded upon his success with a new contract with Columbia Records and two further crossover albums in Loveland (Columbia, 1978) and Exotic Mysteries (Columbia, 1978), the latter containing the single "Space Princess" which became a disco/R&B hit popular in clubs today in both 7" and remixed 12" versions. "Space Princess" was written by, and featured the bass lines of 16-year-old Marcus Miller, who was discovered by Smith and also wrote the track "Night Flower" on Exotic Mysteries. A further track from the same album, "Quiet Moments", was to become a mainstay of the smooth jazz genre over the next decade.

After the crossover success of the 1970s, and continuing interest in and discovery of his earlier work by fans of the new "Quiet Storm" late-night radio/smooth jazz format, Smith moved to Bob Thiele's new label, Doctor Jazz, and had a minor hit in 1983 with "Never Too Late". He also appeared in Marvin Gaye's backing band at the 1980 Montreux Jazz Festival, which has since been released on both CD and DVD (Eagle Vision, 2003). However, public interest slowly waned in his newer material as the decade wore on, and the Cosmic Echoes eventually dissipated around 1976.

The story of how Smith came to join Bob Thiele at Thiele's new label is told on the LP cover notes to Dreams of Tomorrow (1983) by Leonard Feather. Clearly Smith was at a crossroads. The reuniting with Thiele brought Smith full circle for Thiele was partly responsible for supporting Smith's early work. Thiele's new record label 'Doctor Jazz' (distributed through PRT in the UK) provided the perfect platform for Smith to showcase his new and critically acclaimed work of the early to mid 1980s. For Dreams of Tomorrow, Smith enlisted the vocal talents of his younger brother Donald Smith for the album's opener A Lonely Way to Be and side two's stunning opening Never Too Late. A major musician on the album was Marcus Miller on bass guitar. David Hubbard plays a series of saxophones and flutes on the album, with Yogi Horton, Buddy Williams and Steve Thornton leading on drums and percussion. The Dreams of Tomorrow sessions were produced by Marcus Miller. The album relaunched Smith and the 'Doctor Jazz' albums are now considered amongst Smith's finest work. Among them, Smith's 1984 album Silhouettes, and 1985 album Rejuvenation, both feature Premik Russell Tubbs on soprano saxophone and alto flute.

=== Later career (1986–present) ===
In October 1986, he moved closer to his musical roots with Make Someone Happy (Doctor Jazz, 1986), an acoustic session that included new recordings of several jazz standards by the trio of Smith, Cecil McBee and Al Foster, produced by Bob Thiele. However, despite critical acclaim for this work, Smith found himself without a recording contract until the turn of the decade, when the small Startrak label released Love Goddess (Startrak, 1990) and Magic Lady (Startrak, 1991). "I had a lot of idealistic concepts about music, and about the spiritual message I was trying to get across. But most record companies only care about demographics and bottom line sales." Both of the Startrak albums marked an about turn to the smooth jazz mode of the Cosmic Echoes period, Love Goddess featuring vocalist Phyllis Hyman and saxophonist Stanley Turrentine.

Around this time, the emerging hip-hop movement took an interest in Smith's earlier work, and he found himself working with rapper Guru, who was mixing hip-hop with jazz in an innovative way. "Guru and the other rappers would tell me how their uncles used to make them listen to me and Miles and Donald Byrd and how they got the message" Smith told Australia's Daily Telegraph Mirror newspaper in 1995. Smith appeared on Guru's groundbreaking Jazzmatazz, Vol. 1 album (Chrysalis, 1993), once again finding a new audience for his earlier work as a result. He had also toured Europe in 1991, but after this short period of activity Smith produced little further work in the 1990s. Despite extensive radio play, appearing on a number of compilation albums and being name-checked and sampled by an increasing number of younger musicians discovering his Cosmic Echoes output, he spent the next few years mainly involved in setting up his own label, Loveland, and it was not until 1998 that Sony International took advantage of his newfound audience by reissuing Exotic Mysteries and Loveland as a double CD. The same year, he recorded Transformation (Loveland, 1998), once again revisiting the genre he had been most successful in and reuniting with his brother Donald's vocals. For this release he re-recorded "A Chance For Peace (Give Peace a Chance)" (both as vocal and instrumental versions) and "Expansions" as well as "Space Princess".

Since 1998, he has continued to perform live and tour on a number of occasions, especially in Europe and Japan, where he remains popular with new generations of listeners. He has also spent much of his time teaching at various workshops. In 2002, Sony issued a double album retrospective of his Columbia output, Explorations: The Columbia Years, and his compositions remain a feature of jazz fusion orientated radio and CD compilations. The Cosmic Echoes track, "Expansions" has been featured in two videogames: Grand Theft Auto: Vice City and Driver: Parallel Lines, while "A Chance for Peace" featured in Grand Theft Auto IV. He appeared on the Jazz World Stage at Glastonbury Festival June 2009.

In 2023, he released his first new recording in 25 years, "JID017," on the Jazz is Dead label.

== Discography ==
=== Lonnie Liston Smith and the Cosmic Echoes ===
- 1973 Astral Traveling (Flying Dutchman)
- 1974 Cosmic Funk (RCA/Flying Dutchman)
- 1974 Expansions (RCA/Flying Dutchman)
- 1975 Visions of a New World (RCA/Flying Dutchman)
- 1976 Reflections of a Golden Dream (RCA/Flying Dutchman)
- 1977 Renaissance (RCA Victor)
- 1977 Live! (RCA Victor)
- 1978 Loveland (Columbia)
- 1978 Exotic Mysteries (Columbia)
- 1979 A Song for the Children (Columbia)
- 1980 Love Is the Answer (Columbia)

=== Later work ===
- 1983 Dreams of Tomorrow (Doctor Jazz)
- 1984 Silhouettes (Doctor Jazz)
- 1985 Rejuvenation (Doctor Jazz)
- 1986 Make Someone Happy (Doctor Jazz)
- 1990 Love Goddess (Startrak/Arista)
- 1991 Magic Lady (Startrak)
- 1998 Transformation (Loveland/Ichiban/EMI)
- 2023 Lonnie Liston Smith JID017 (Jazz is Dead)

=== Appearances ===
With Gato Barbieri

- The Third World (Flying Dutchman, 1969)
- Fenix (Flying Dutchman, 1971)
- El Pampero (Flying Dutchman, 1971)
- Under Fire (Flying Dutchman, 1971)
- Bolivia (Flying Dutchman, 1973)
- El Gato (Flying Dutchman/RCA, 1975)

With Miles Davis

- Big Fun (Columbia, 1974)
- The Complete On the Corner Sessions (Columbia/Legacy, 2007)

With Karl Denson

- The Bridge (Relaxed, 2002)

With Marvin Gaye

- Live in Montreux 1980 (Eagle, 1980 [2002]) DVD+CD

With Roland Kirk

- Here Comes the Whistleman (Atlantic, 1965)
- A Meeting of the Times (Atlantic, 1965) with Al Hibbler
- Now Please Don't You Cry, Beautiful Edith (Verve, 1967)

With Oliver Nelson

- Skull Session (Flying Dutchman/RCA, 1975)

With Pharoah Sanders

- Izipho Zam (My Gifts) (Strata-East, 1969 [1973])
- Karma (Impulse!, 1969)
- Jewels of Thought (Impulse!, 1969)
- Deaf Dumb Blind (Summun Bukmun Umyun) (Impulse!, 1970)
- Thembi (Impulse!, 1971)

With Huey Simmons

- Burning Spirits (Contemporary, 1971)

With Bob Thiele

- Mysterious Flying Orchestra (RCA, 1977)

With Leon Thomas

- Spirits Known and Unknown (Flying Dutchman, 1969)

With Stanley Turrentine

- Sugar (CTI, 1970)
