= Flying Dutchman Records =

Defunct American record label

- Parent company: Sony Music Entertainment
- Founded: 1969
- Founder: Bob Thiele
- Defunct: 1984
- Status: Inactive
- Distributor: Legacy Recordings
- Genre: Jazz
- Country of origin: U.S.
- Location: New York City

Flying Dutchman Records was an American jazz record label, which was owned by music industry executive, producer and songwriter Bob Thiele.

== History ==
Initially distributed by Atlantic Records, Thiele made a five-album deal in 1972 with Mega Records to issue five albums in the Flying Dutchman Series. The deal was not renewed and distribution shifted to RCA Records, which took over the label in 1976. The label released albums until 1984 when Thiele established Doctor Jazz Records. Some of the musicians who recorded several albums for the label include singer Leon Thomas, saxophonist Gato Barbieri, arranger Oliver Nelson, saxophonist Tom Scott and pianist Lonnie Liston Smith. Gil Scott-Heron released three albums for the label, including his debut Small Talk at 125th and Lenox and Free Will.

Flying Dutchman had three sublabels, Amsterdam, BluesTime, and Contact.

Flying Dutchman is independently owned and since 2011 has been distributed and marketed by Ace Records.

== Discography ==
=== 10100 Series ===
Flying Dutchman Records commenced releasing LPs in 1969 with the 10100 Series that continued until 1973.

Catalog No.	Album	Artist	Details
10101	Soulful Brass #2	Steve Allen	
10102	Come and Stick Your Head In	Spontaneous Combustion	
10103	Appleton Syntonic Menagerie	Jon Appleton	
10104	Emergency-Head Start	Bob Thiele	
10105	Ain't No Ambulances For No Nigguhs Tonight	Stanley Crouch	
10106	Hair to Jazz	Tom Scott	
10107	The Giant is Awakened	Horace Tapscott	
10108	Flight for Four	John Carter & Bobby Bradford Quartet	
10109	Hog Fat	Jimmy Gordon	
10110	Oh! Calcutta!	Ron Anthony	
10111	A Night at Santa Rita	Robert Scheer	
10112	My People	Duke Ellington	
10113	Newport News, Virginia	Esther Marrow	
10114	Paint Your Wagon	Tom Scott	
10115	Spirits Known and Unknown	Leon Thomas	
10116	Black, Brown and Beautiful	Oliver Nelson	
10117	The Third World	Gato Barbieri	
10118	Massacre at My Lai	Pete Hamill	
10120	3 Shades of Blue	Johnny Hodges	with Leon Thomas and Oliver Nelson
10121	Human Music	Jon Appleton and Don Cherry	
10122	Othello Ballet Suite/Electronic Organ Sonata No. 1	George Russell	Also released on Sonet in Europe
10123	Friends and Neighbors: Live at Prince Street	Ornette Coleman	
10124	Electronic Sonata for Souls Loved by Nature	George Russell	
10125	Esoteric Circle	Jan Garbarek	
10126	The 8th of July, 1969	Gunter Hampel	
10127	Murder at Kent State University	Pete Hamill	
10128	Self Determination Music	John Carter and Bobby Bradford	
10130	The Mayor and the People	Carl B. Stokes	A Black Suite for String Quartet and Jazz Orchestra by Oliver Nelson
10131	Small Talk at 125th & Lenox	Gil Scott-Heron	
10132	The Leon Thomas Album	Leon Thomas	
10133	Soulful Brass #3	Steve Allen	
10134	Berlin Dialogue for Orchestra	Oliver Nelson and the "Berlin Dreamband"	
10135	El Exigente: The Demanding One	Chico Hamilton	
10136	SNCC's Rap	H. Rap Brown / Leon Thomas	
10137	The Great Comedy Album Starring Spiro T. Agnew	Will Jordan	
10138	Afrique	Count Basie and His Orchestra	Arranged and conducted by Oliver Nelson
10139	Barefoot Boy	Larry Coryell	
10140	California Here I Come	Mike Lipskin with Willie "The Lion" Smith	
10141	Soul & Soledad	Angela Davis	
10142	Leon Thomas in Berlin	Leon Thomas with Oliver Nelson	
10143	Pieces of a Man	Gil Scott-Heron	
10144	Fénix	Gato Barbieri	
10145	Sunshine Man	Harold Alexander	
10146	Classic Tenors	Coleman Hawkins / Lester Young	Recorded December 1943
10147	Here Comes Earl "Fatha" Hines	Earl Hines	Reissue of 1966 Contact LP
10148	Are You Ready?	Harold Alexander	
10149	Swiss Suite	Oliver Nelson	
10150	Shelly Manne & Co.	Shelly Manne	Reissue of 1965 Contact LP compiling 1940s recordings
10151	El Pampero	Gato Barbieri	
10152	Those Were the Days	Bob Thiele	
10153	Free Will	Gil Scott-Heron	
10154	Soul Is... Pretty Purdie	Bernard Purdie	
10155	Blues and the Soulful Truth	Leon Thomas	
10156	Under Fire	Gato Barbieri	
10157	Song for Wounded Knee	Richard Davis	
10158	Bolivia	Gato Barbieri	
10159	What a Wonderful World	Bobby Hackett	
10161	The Songs of Bessie Smith	Teresa Brewer, Count Basie and Thad Jones	
10163	Astral Traveling	Lonnie Liston Smith & The Cosmic Echoes	
10164	Facets: An Anthology	Leon Thomas	Compilation
10165	The Legend of Gato Barbieri	Gato Barbieri	Compilation
10166	It Don't Mean a Thing If It Ain't Got That Swing	Duke Ellington and Teresa Brewer	
10167	Full Circle	Leon Thomas	

=== BluesTime Series ===
In 1969 Flying Dutchman established the BluesTime label to record blues music issuing ten albums between 1969 and 1970.

Catalog No. (BTS)	Album	Artist	Details
9001	The Plaster Caster Blues Band	The Plaster Casters	
9002	The Real Boss of the Blues	Joe Turner	
9003	Super Black Blues	T-Bone Walker / Joe Turner / Otis Spann	
9004	Every Day I Have the Blues	T-Bone Walker	
9005	The Return of Harmonica Slim	Harmonica Slim	
9006	Sweet Giant of the Blues	Otis Spann	
9007	The Original Cleanhead	Eddie “Cleanhead” Vinson	
9008	Just the Blues	Malcolm & Chris	
9009	Super Black Blues Volume II	Leon Thomas / T-Bone Walker / Eddie "Cleanhead" Vinson / Joe Turner	Two record set recorded live at Carnegie Hall in 1970
9010	Blue Rocks	Otis Spann / T-Bone Walker /Joe Turner / Eddie "Cleanhead" Vinson	
1378	Dues Paid: The Bluestime Story 1968-1971	Various Artists	Compilation

=== Amsterdam ===
The Amsterdam subsidiary label was established in 1970 and concentrated of popular music including the recordings of Thiele's wife Teresa Brewer.

Catalog No. (AMS)	Album	Artist	Details
12001	Bossa Nova de Paris	Valentino Marcel	
12002	Never Again	Golda Meir and Various Artists	Audio documentary on Israel through the voices of its leaders and people narrated by David Perry
12003	Love Poems for the Very Married	Lois Wyse	Music arranged and conducted by Tom Scott
12004	Return from the Dead	Dirty John's Hot Dog Stand with Kenny Paulson	
12005	Heavy Equipment	Euclid	
12006	I Love You Better Now	Lois Wyse	
12007	The Minx (Soundtrack)	The Cyrkle	
12008	Here’s That Band Again: Dick Jurgens Plays His Hits	Dick Jurgens	
12009	Louis Armstrong and His Friends	Louis Armstrong	Music arranged and conducted by Oliver Nelson
12010	Leave Them a Flower	Wally Whyton	
12011	Here’s That Band Again Today	Dick Jurgens	
12012	Singin’ a Doo Dah Song	Teresa Brewer	
12013	Music, Music, Music	Teresa Brewer	
12014	Playing on the Moon	Biscuit Davis	
12015	Teresa Brewer in London	Teresa Brewer	

=== Reggae Series ===
In 1970 Flying Dutchman established the Reggae label to record reggae music issuing four albums.

Catalog No. (RS)	Album	Artist	Details
15001	The Reggae Beat	Superman	
15002	Super Reggae	The Liquidators	
15003	Reggae Thing	The Ironmen	
15004	Doin’ the Reggae	Heavy Reggae Machine	

=== Mega Records ===
Five albums produced under the Flying Dutchman Productions banner were released by the Mega label in 1972

Catalog No. (M)	Album	Artist	Details
31-1012	You Can't Make Love Alone	Eddie “Cleanhead” Vinson	
51-5000	Fairyland	Larry Coryell	
51-5001	Stand by Me (Whatcha See Is Whatcha Get)	Pretty Purdie and the Playboys	
51-5002	Let’s Dance Again	Benny Goodman and His Orchestra	Recorded in 1969
51-5003	Gold Sunrise on Magic Mountain	Leon Thomas	

=== RCA Distributed Series ===
Starting in 1974, Flying Dutchman albums were released and distributed by RCA using their numbering system.

Catalog No.	Album	Artist	Details
0549	Old Rags	The New Sunshine Jazz Band	
0550	Yesterdays	Gato Barbieri	
0591	Cosmic Funk	Lonnie Liston Smith & The Cosmic Echoes	
0592	Oliver Edward Nelson in London with Oily Rags	Oliver Nelson	
0613	The Revolution Will Not Be Televised	Gil Scott-Heron	Compilation
0825	Skull Session	Oliver Nelson	
0827	Onsaya Joy	Groove Holmes	
0829	Strike Up the Band	Bobby Hackett with Zoot Sims and Bucky Pizzarelli	
0830	Cesar 830	Cesar	
0833	Tom Scott in L.A.	Tom Scott	Compilation
0834	Expansions	Lonnie Liston Smith & The Cosmic Echoes	
0964	I Saw Pinetop Spit Blood	Bob Thiele and His Orchestra	
1082	Bird and Dizzy: A Musical Tribute	Elek Bacsik	
1120	Nightwings	Bucky Pizzarelli and Joe Venuti	
1145	Hot Coles	Shelly Manne	
1146	Six Million Dollar Man	Richard "Groove" Holmes	
1147	El Gato	Gato Barbieri	
1196	Visions of a New World	Lonnie Liston Smith & The Cosmic Echoes	
1197	Dumpy Mama	Sonny Stitt	
1239	The French Market Jazz Band	The French Market Jazz Band	
1371	The World's Greatest Jazz Band of Yank Lawson & Bob Haggart In Concert	Yank Lawson and Bob Haggart	
1372	Scott Joplin Interpretations	Mike Wofford	
1378	Buck & Bud	Bud Freeman and Bucky Pizzarelli	
1449	A Dream Deferred	Oliver Nelson	
1460	Reflections of a Golden Dream	Lonnie Liston Smith & The Cosmic Echoes	
1461	Sometime Other Than Now	Steve Marcus	
1537	I'm in the Mood for Love	Richard Holmes	
1538	Stomp Off Let's Go	Sonny Stitt	
2568	Three Waves	Steve Kuhn Trio	Reissue of 1966 Contact LP
