= Red Sky =

Red Sky may refer to:

- Red Sky (EP), an EP by Thrice
- "Red Skies", a song by the Fixx from Shuttered Room
- "Red Sky" (song), a song by Status Quo from In the Army Now
- Red Sky (2011 film), a 2011 Greek film
- Red Sky (2014 film), an action film directed by Mario Van Peebles
- Blood Red Sky, 2021 action-horror film directed by Peter Thorwarth
- Chekka Chivantha Vaanam (lit. 'The Sky is Red'), a 2018 Indian film directed by Mani Ratnam
- "Red Sky" (Stargate SG-1), an episode of Stargate SG-1
- Red Sky Music Festival, a music festival in Omaha, Nebraska, USA
- "Red Sky", a song on the 1995 Pat Metheny Group album We Live Here
- "Red Sky", an episode of V
- Red Skies, a novel by Jenny Oldfield
- Red Sky (Ralph McTell album), 2000
- Red Sky (Moon Hooch album), 2016
- Red Sky (Hunter Hayes album), 2023

== See also ==
- Red Skye Comics, an American comic book line
- Diffuse sky radiation
- Red sky at morning (disambiguation)
- Red sky at night (disambiguation)
