= First Man (soundtrack) =

First Man (Original Motion Picture Soundtrack)

Soundtrack album by Justin Hurwitz
- Released: October 12, 2018
- Studios: Sony Scoring Stage, California
- Genres: Electronic; orchestral; ambience; vintage
- Length: 1:07:57
- Label: Back Lot Music

Justin Hurwitz chronology
La La Land (2016)	First Man (2018)	Babylon (2022)

First Man (Original Motion Picture Soundtrack) is the soundtrack album to the 2018 film First Man, directed by Damien Chazelle. The musical score was composed and conducted by Chazelle's usual collaborator and Harvard University classmate, Justin Hurwitz. The score uses electronic, orchestral and vintage sounds. In addition to a 94-piece orchestra, an electronic theremin, a moog synthesiser and several other instruments were used, fused with vintage sound-altering machines during the audio mix. The soundtrack released by Back Lot Music on October 12, 2018, received positive reviews from critics, who praised it for its balance of softer melodic passages and powerful themes. Hurwitz's score received several awards and nominations, including the Golden Globe Award for Best Original Score.

== Development ==
The score was performed by a 94-piece orchestra at Sony Scoring Stage in California, with instruments such as the electronic theremin and Moog synthesizer, as well as vintage sound-altering machines including Leslie speakers and an Echoplex.

Based primarily on the script from Josh Singer, Hurwitz began creating piano demos before principal photography began until he and Chazelle decided on one that would become the main theme. "It had to have a sense of loneliness but also beauty. Like when he gets to the moon – you're on this barren surface; it's all very beautiful, but it's very, very lonely." Chazelle liked the theremin's association with low-budget sci-fi pictures of the '50s and early '60s, as according to him, "Armstrong and his NASA colleagues were, in their race to the Moon, basically doing real-life science fiction". He further added, "Those were the sounds and images we had in our minds of the moon, and space in general. At its heart, this was a story about grief, about someone who lost a lot of people he loved, and what those losses did to him. There was something about the theremin that seemed to convey that grief that spanned across the cosmos. It obviously makes you think of space, but it also has those qualities of the human voice – a sort of wailing – that could feel very mournful to me."

Hurwitz acquired a theremin and learned how to play it, and his performances are in the final score, as he wanted to "sound electronic, but not harsh or abrasive" and tried to make it, in most places, mildly to blend with the orchestral music. He further added an American Moog and a British EMS VCS 3 synthesiser model, as they sounded "futuristic" during the late-1960s. In addition to this, Hurwitz predominantly made use of harp in the score for the "intimate moments". Other instruments such as violins, violas, cellos, basses, brass, strings, woodwinds and percussion instruments were used in the conclusion of the film, particularly brass being used only after the sequences following Apollo 11 mission. Saying in an interview, to Collider: "we had developed that palette early on with those electronic sounds and we wanted to feather in very lightly bits of some vintage synths and some of the sounds and ambiences that we had designed. We wanted to layer in very, very light touches here and there, just to kind of create an atmosphere in a lot of those scenes. It wasn't about articulating melody as much as it was just like creating a little bit of atmosphere to get you to feel something." During the final mixing process, Hurwitz designed the score with analogue rotor cabinets, and then being synthesised with analog instruments.

Leon Bridges appears in the film as Gil Scott-Heron, reciting the Scott-Heron spoken-word poem "Whitey on the Moon". Chazelle felt it was important to underscore that one of the challenges at the time was the push back of citizens who did not agree with the expense, and the risk, of the space program. On October 4, 2018, Entertainment Weekly reported that two themes from the film's score soundtrack, were released as preview tracks, before the soundtrack's release through Back Lot Music on October 12.

== Track listing ==
No.	Title	Performers	Length
1.	"X-15"	Justin Hurwitz	1:22
2.	"Good Engineer"	Justin Hurwitz	1:06
3.	"Karen"	Justin Hurwitz	0:45
4.	"Armstrong Cabin"	Justin Hurwitz	1:15
5.	"Another Egghead"	Justin Hurwitz	1:05
6.	"It'll Be an Adventure"	Justin Hurwitz	0:41
7.	"Houston"	Justin Hurwitz	2:16
8.	"Multi-Axis Trainer"	Justin Hurwitz	2:54
9.	"Baby Mark"	Justin Hurwitz	0:47
10.	"Lunar Rhapsody" (featuring Les Baxter)	Dr. Samuel J. Hoffman	3:04
11.	"First to Dock"	Justin Hurwitz	1:27
12.	"Elliot"	Justin Hurwitz	0:28
13.	"Sextant"	Justin Hurwitz	1:45
14.	"Squawk Box"	Justin Hurwitz	1:54
15.	"Searching for the Agena"	Justin Hurwitz	1:51
16.	"Docking Waltz"	Justin Hurwitz	3:22
17.	"Spin"	Justin Hurwitz	1:15
18.	"Naha Rescue 1"	Justin Hurwitz	1:05
19.	"Pat and Janet"	Justin Hurwitz	1:34
20.	"The Armstrongs"	Justin Hurwitz	2:25
21.	"I Oughta Be Getting Home / Plugs Out"	Justin Hurwitz	1:10
22.	"News Report"	Justin Hurwitz	0:42
23.	"Dad's Fine"	Justin Hurwitz	1:03
24.	"Whitey on the Moon"	Leon Bridges	1:48
25.	"Neil Packs"	Justin Hurwitz	1:25
26.	"Contingency Statement"	Justin Hurwitz	1:56
27.	"Apollo 11 Launch"	Justin Hurwitz	5:50
28.	"Translunar"	Justin Hurwitz	1:01
29.	"Moon"	Justin Hurwitz	1:07
30.	"Tunnel"	Justin Hurwitz	0:52
31.	"The Landing"	Justin Hurwitz	5:31
32.	"Moon Walk"	Justin Hurwitz	1:29
33.	"Home"	Justin Hurwitz	1:51
34.	"Crater"	Justin Hurwitz	2:00
35.	"Quarantine"	Justin Hurwitz	2:15
36.	"End Credits"	Justin Hurwitz	4:19
37.	"Sep Ballet" (Bonus track)	Justin Hurwitz	1:17
Total length:			67:57

== Reception ==
=== Critical response ===
Reviewing for The Hollywood Reporter at the film's premiere in Venice Film Festival in August 2018, David Rooney called Hurwitz's score as "masterful", "from tender, melodic passages through echoes (intended?) of vintage Jerry Goldsmith to a rare burst of full-thrust power when the lunar surface is first glimpsed up close, the quiet majesty of the drama owes much to the infinite moods of the score". Scott Snowden of Space.com wrote "The instrumental score by Justin Hurwitz – on more than one occasion – was reminiscent of the wonderful soundtrack by Philip Sheppard to the series Moon Machines (2008) and like that underrated TV show, the music is utilized to great effect in this movie." Zanobard Reviews called First Man score as "pretty spectacular" and opined "The way Justin Hurwitz perfectly captures the mysterious and suspenseful nature of space is superb, and at points you really feel just how awed and at the same time terrified the astronauts must have been as they rocketed towards the Moon, so he did a great job there too [...] The score builds-up its themes incredibly well, but it takes a long time and so makes for a very dull forty minutes before the music finally kicks into gear with the likes of Apollo 11 Launch and The Landing. Still, once it did finally get there the score performed excellently, especially when the two main themes finally came together."

=== Chart performance ===
Chart (2018)	Peak position
UK Soundtrack Albums (OCC)	29
US Soundtrack Albums (Billboard)	34

== Accolades ==
Award	Date of ceremony	Category	Recipient(s)	Result	Ref(s)
Austin Film Critics Association	January 7, 2019	Best Original Score	Justin Hurwitz	Nominated	
Boston Society of Film Critics	December 16, 2018	Best Original Score	Justin Hurwitz	Runner-up	
Capri Hollywood International Film Festival	January 2, 2019	Best Original Score	Justin Hurwitz	Won	
Chicago Film Critics Association	December 8, 2018	Best Original Score	Justin Hurwitz	Nominated	
Critics' Choice Movie Awards	January 13, 2019	Best Score	Justin Hurwitz	Won	
Dallas–Fort Worth Film Critics Association	December 17, 2018	Best Musical Score	Justin Hurwitz	2nd place	
Florida Film Critics Circle	December 21, 2018	Best Score	Justin Hurwitz	Won	
Georgia Film Critics Association	January 12, 2019	Best Original Score	Justin Hurwitz	Won	
Golden Globe Awards	January 6, 2019	Best Original Score	Justin Hurwitz	Won	
Hollywood Film Awards	November 4, 2018	Hollywood Film Composer Award	Justin Hurwitz	Won	
Hollywood Music in Media Awards	November 14, 2018	Original Score – Feature Film	Justin Hurwitz	Nominated	
Houston Film Critics Society	January 3, 2019	Best Original Score	Justin Hurwitz	Nominated	
Los Angeles Film Critics Association	December 9, 2018	Best Music	Justin Hurwitz	Runner-up	
Online Film Critics Society	January 2, 2019	Best Original Score	Justin Hurwitz	Nominated	
San Francisco Film Critics Circle	December 9, 2018	Best Original Score	Justin Hurwitz	Nominated	
Satellite Awards	February 22, 2019	Best Original Score	Justin Hurwitz	Won	
Seattle Film Critics Society	December 17, 2018	Best Original Score	Justin Hurwitz	Nominated	
St. Louis Film Critics Association	December 16, 2018	Best Score	Justin Hurwitz	Nominated	
Washington D.C. Area Film Critics Association	December 3, 2018	Best Original Score	Justin Hurwitz	Nominated	
