= Lucky Chops =

American jazz band

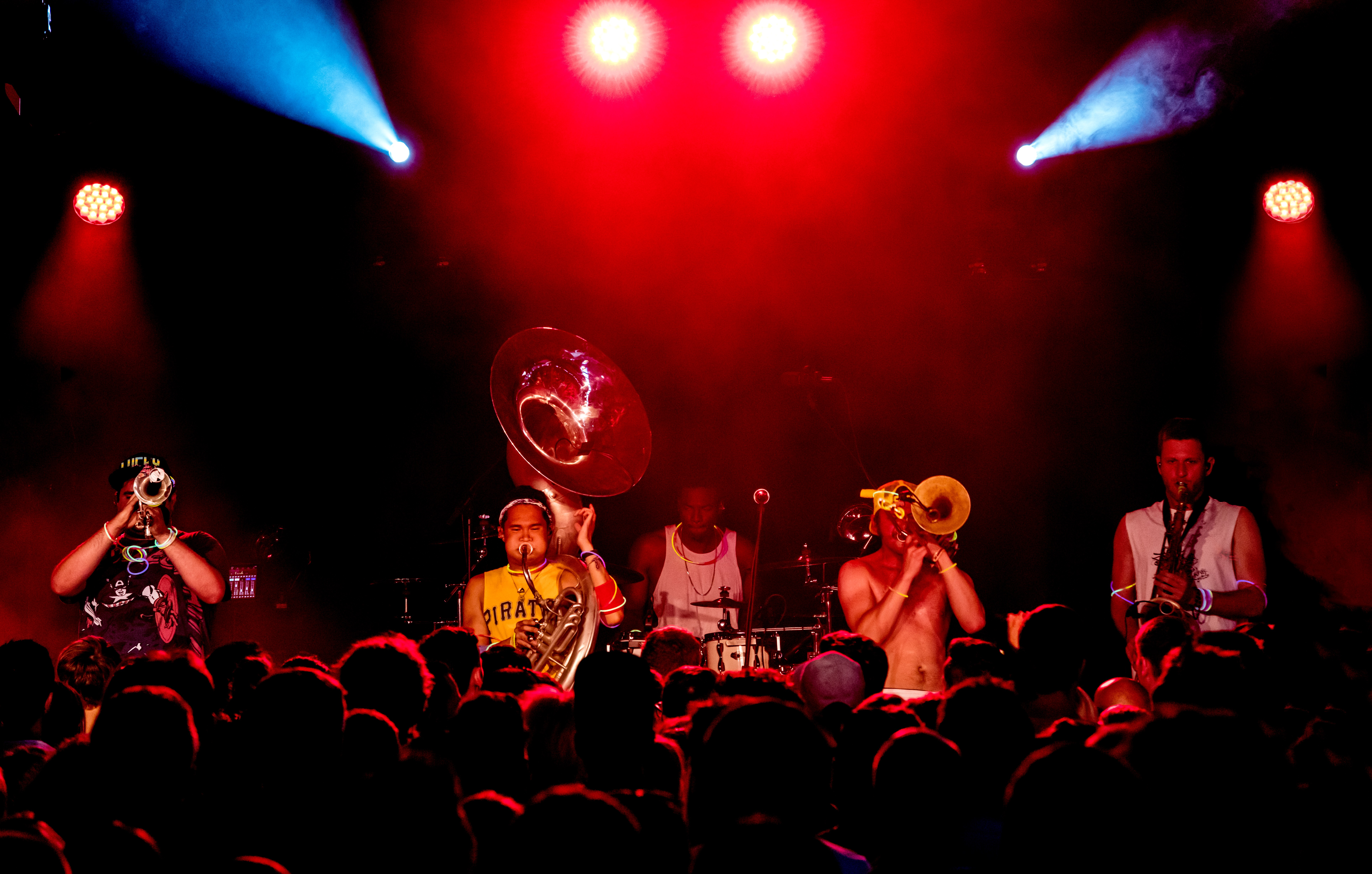
- Performing at Zelt-Musik-Festival 2017. L-R: Gawel, Buyo, Sams, Josh Holcomb, Behroozi.

Background information
- Origin: New York City, New York, U.S.
- Years active: Since 2006
- Members: Josh Holcomb; Daro Behroozi; Joshua Gawel; Nora Nalepka; Ben Holcomb; Rogerst Charles
- Website: luckychops.com

Lucky Chops is a band from New York City, which formed in 2006 and has performed professionally since 2014. They achieved prominence through performances on the New York City Subway which were filmed and shared on the internet.

== History ==
The band was founded in 2006 at Fiorello H. LaGuardia High School by sousaphone player Raphael Buyo along with trombonist Josh Holcomb and saxophonist and clarinetist Daro Behroozi. The band was originally formed for a parade of Filipino culture that Buyo wanted to participate in; after that they began busking on street corners and in subway stations. During their time at college, they decided to take their band to a professional level.

The name "Lucky Chops" was proposed by the band's original trumpet player, Daniel Rutkowski, during a word-association brainstorming session and refers to the fact that all of the players' primary instruments (except the drums) are wind instruments.

Their early music was mainly covers and mash-ups of other songs. Their original works are influenced by the vast mix of cultures in NYC. The band performs a wide variety of musical styles and is not bound by a single genre.

The band began by playing in the New York Subway for commuters. They gained brief internet fame from a 2016 YouTube video showing their rendition of "Funky Town" and "I Got You (I Feel Good)" featuring Leo Pellegrino, which helped to significantly boost their popularity. Around this time, they released their first album, Lucky Chops NYC.

The band has seen over 50 musicians play with them over the past 14 years, including Grace Kelly and Sunny Jain. They are also the live house band of the MTV show Girl Code Live.

== Discography ==
Discography of Lucky Chops
Title	Year	Type
Lucky Chops NYC	2015	Album
2016 World Tour	2016	EP
Walter	2017	EP
Virtue and Vice Sessions, Vol. 1	2018	EP
Lucky Chops	2019	Album
Virtue and Vice Sessions, Vol. 2	2020	Album
2014	2020	Album
Live in L.A.	2021	Album
New Day	2022	Album
Virtue & Vice Sessions, Vol. 3 (Live)	2024	Album
Mr. Charles	2024	Single

== Members ==
Dates cover period of professional performance from 2014 onwards

Current members of Lucky Chops
Name	Instrument	Additional	Date
Joshua Gawel	Trumpet	Flugelhorn, Piano, Vocals	Since 2014
Josh Holcomb	Trombone	Baritone horn, Piano, Percussion, Vocals	Since 2014
Rogerst Charles	Alto saxophone		Since 2022
Daro Behroozi	Baritone saxophone	Tenor saxophone, Clarinet, Bass clarinet, Contrabass clarinet, Alto saxophone, Flute, Vocals	Since 2014
Nora Nalepka	Sousaphone	Percussion, Vocals	Since 2021
Ben Holcomb	Drum kit	Percussion, Vocals	Since 2021

Former Members of Lucky Chops
Name	Instrument	Date
Raphael Buyo	Sousaphone	2014-2018
Leo Pellegrino	Baritone saxophone	2014-2017
Jesse Chevan	Drum kit	2014-2015
Kevin Congleton	Drum kit	2015-2016
Charles Sams	Drum kit	2016-2018
Adrian Condis	Baritone saxophone	2019-2023
Reginald Chapman	Contrabass bugle	2019-2020
Patrick Simard	Drum kit	2019-2021

Touring/Alternate Members of Lucky Chops
Name	Instrument(s)	Date
Timaine Bryane	Sousaphone	2014-2015
Harry Philips	Sousaphone	2018-2019
Matt Olsson	Drum kit	2018
Eric Trudell	Baritone saxophone, Tenor saxophone	2018-2019
Attis Clopton	Drum kit	2018-2019
Corey Wilcox	Sousaphone	2019; 2020-2021
Rogerst Charles	Alto saxophone	2022-2023

== Gallery ==
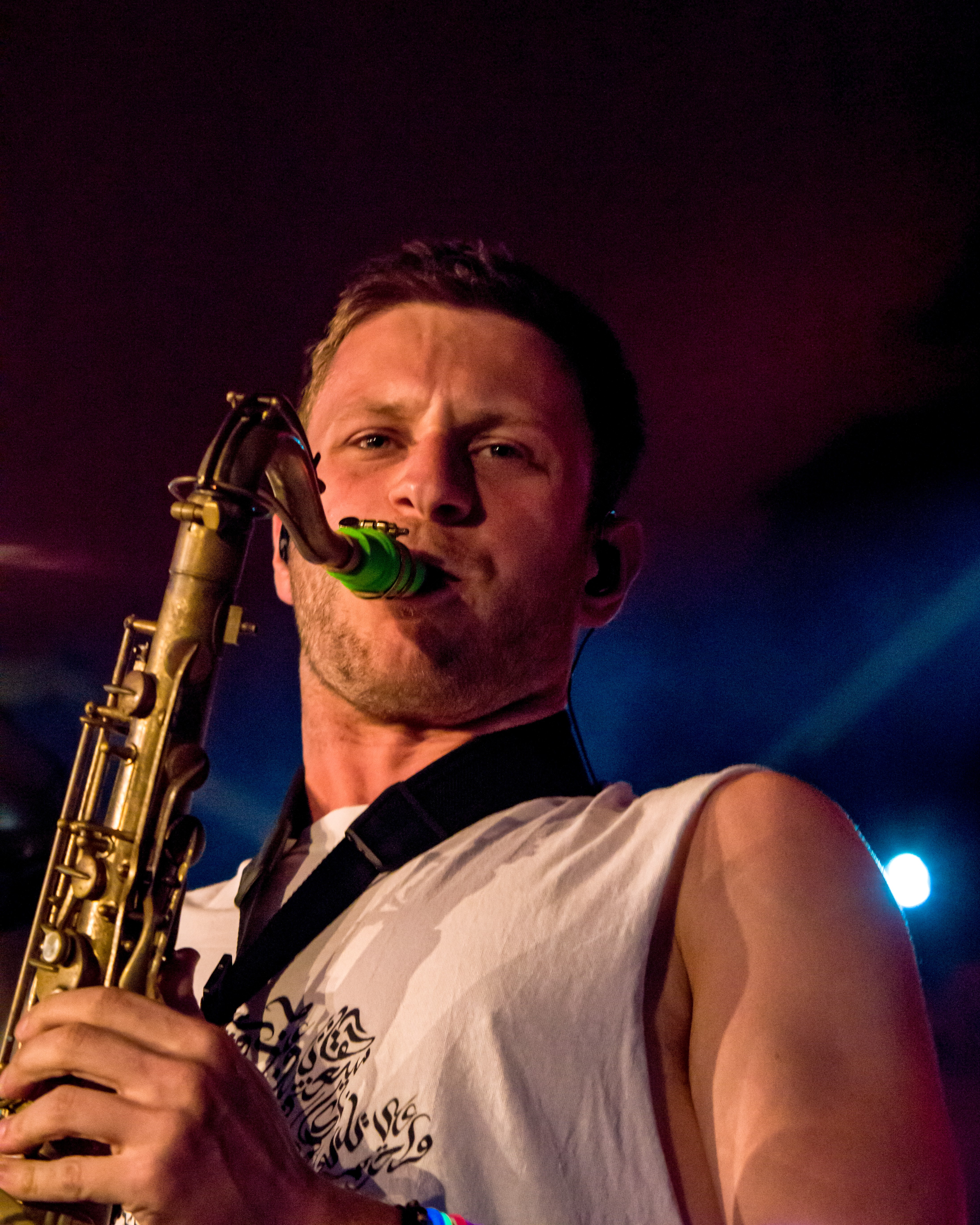
Daro Behroozi in 2017

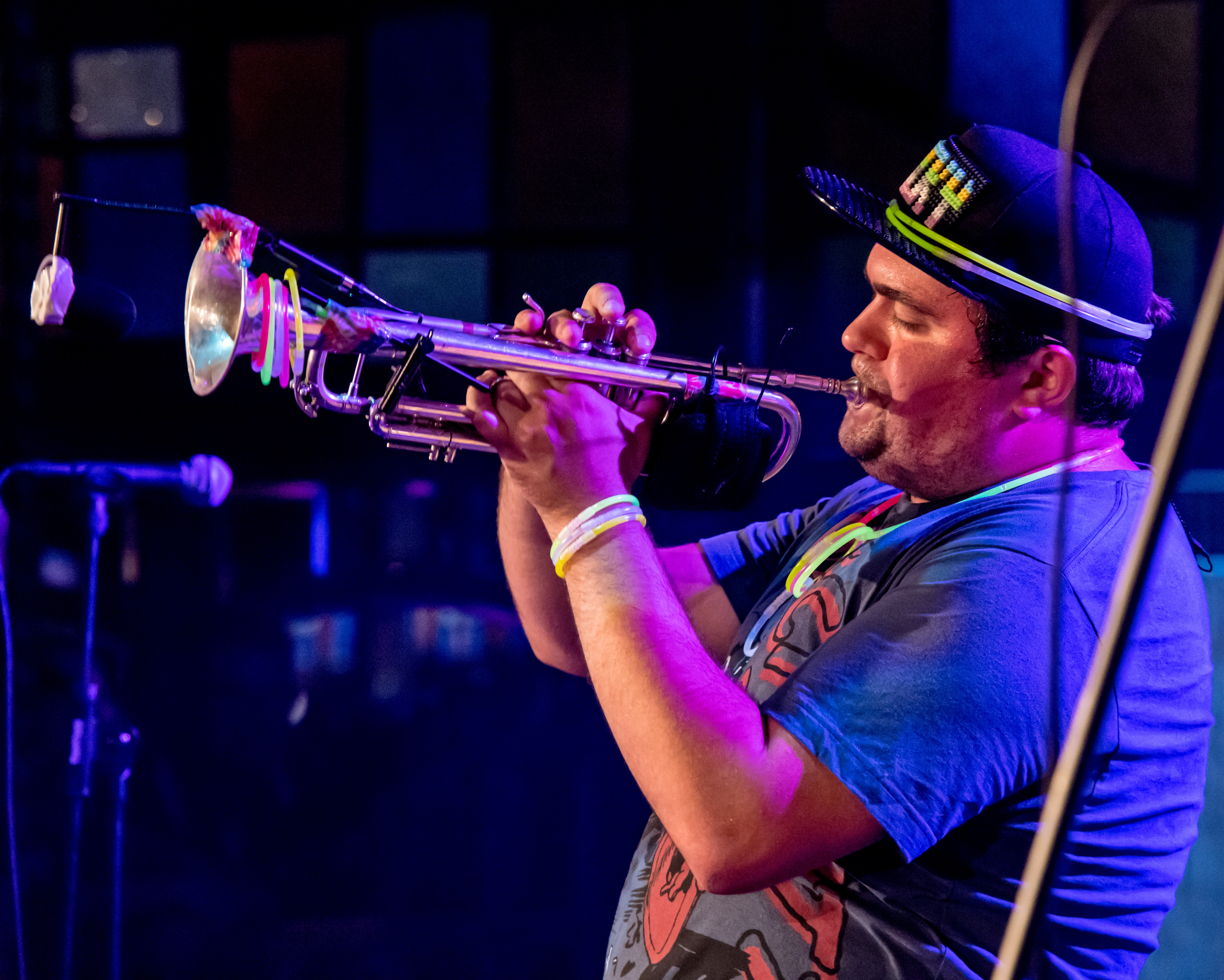
Joshua Gawel in 2017

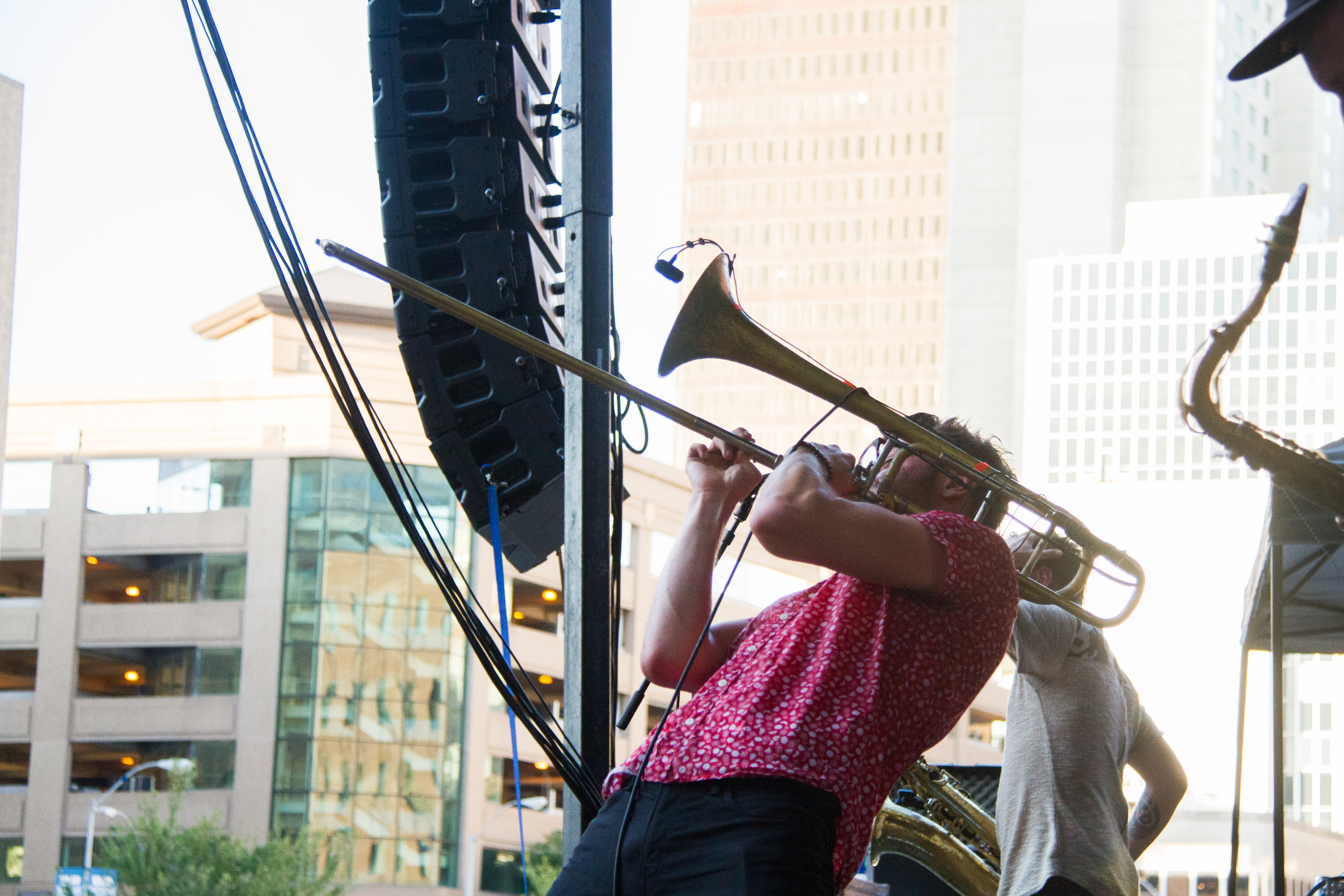
Josh Holcomb in 2016

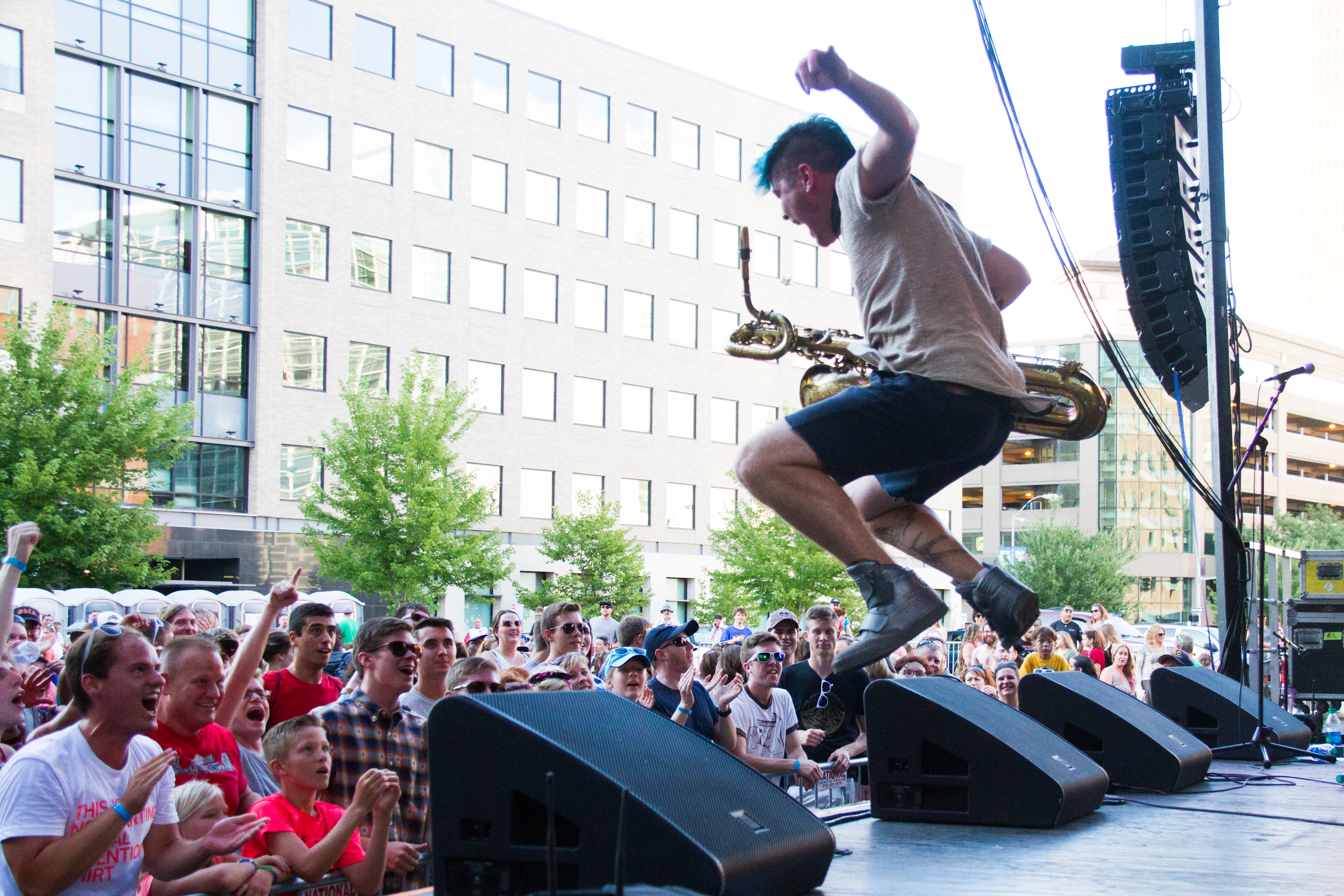
Leo P in 2016

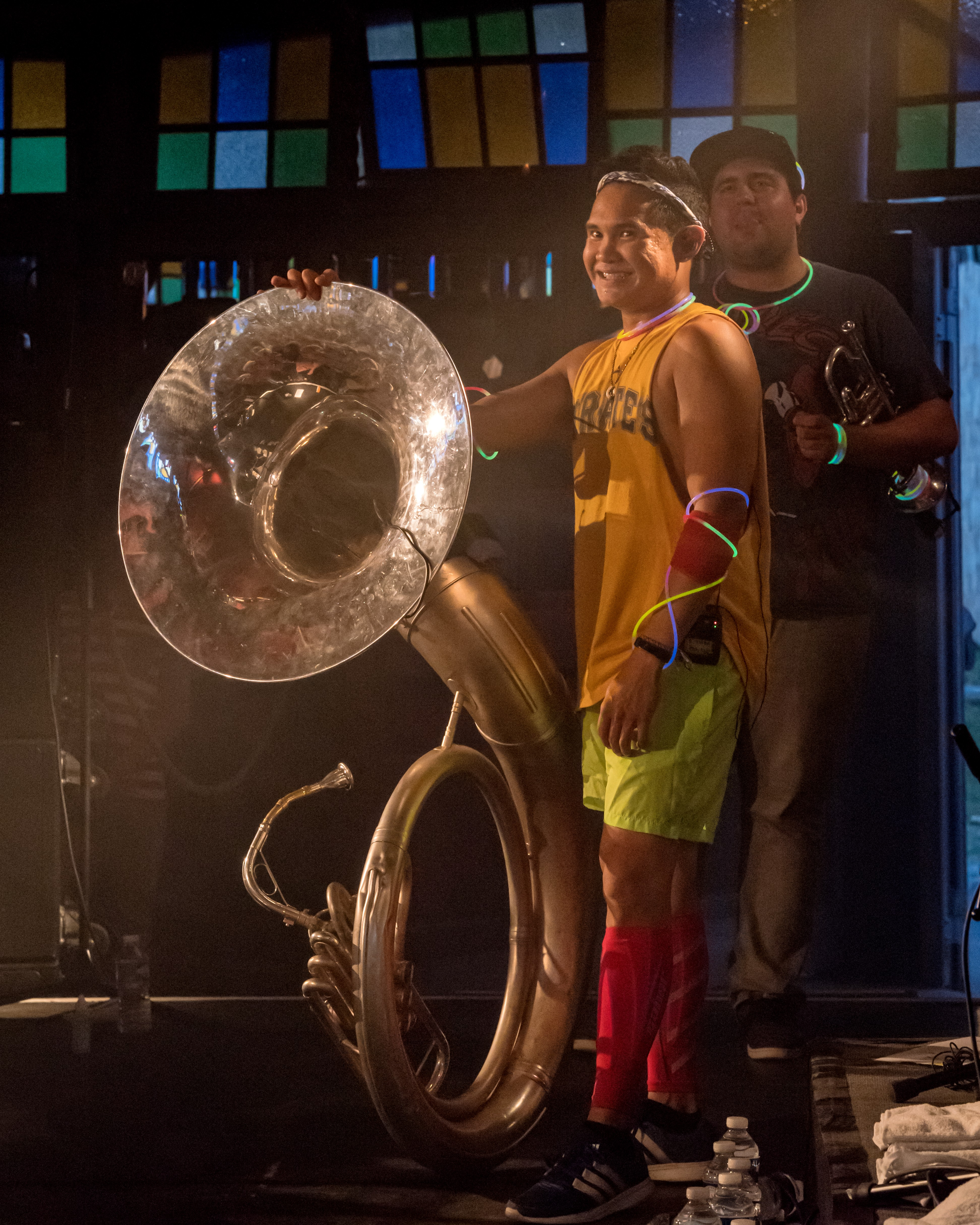
Raphael Buyo with his sousaphone "Walter" in 2017 (Background: Joshua Gawel)

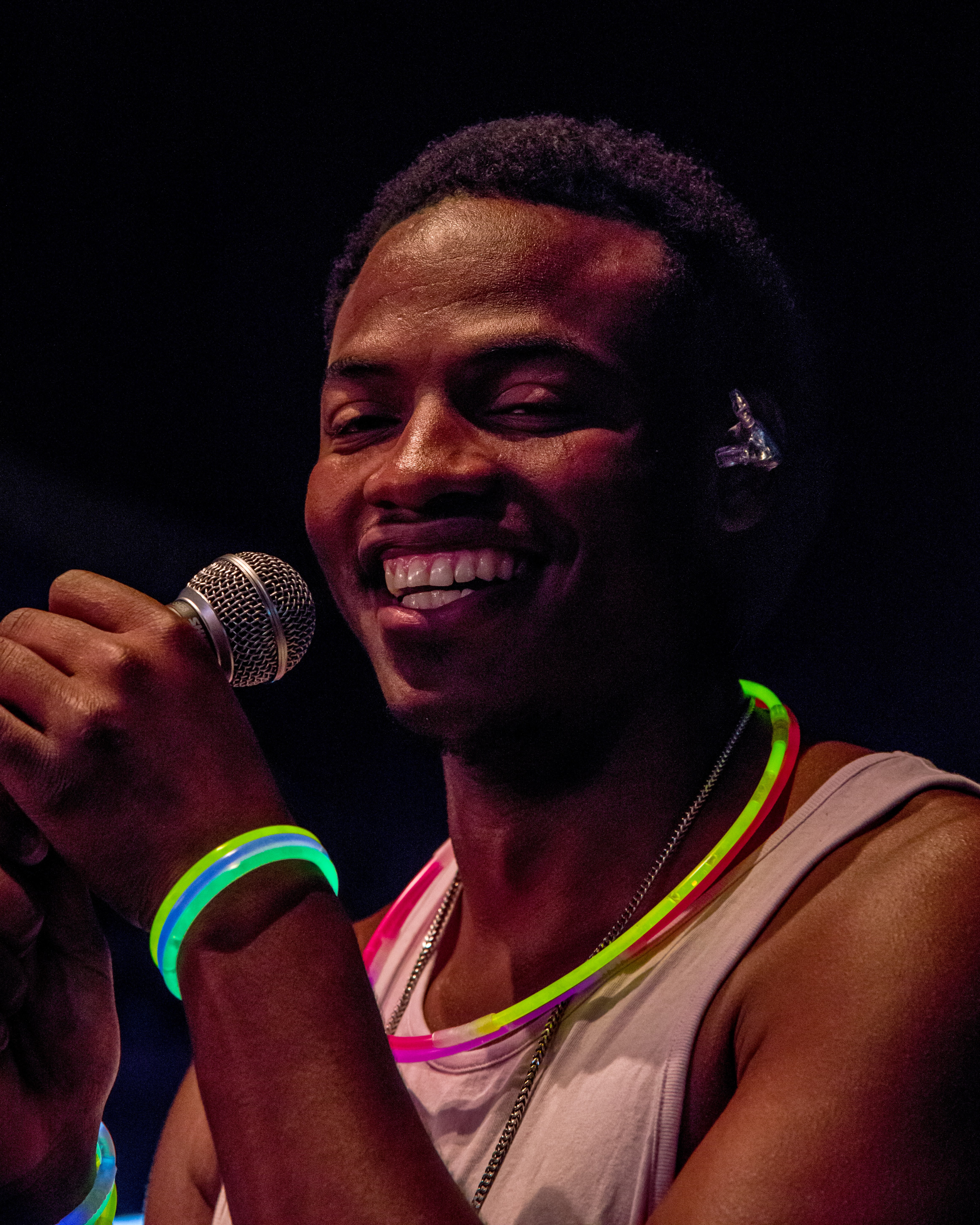
Charles Sams in 2017

== See also ==
- Too Many Zooz
- Moon Hooch
