= Leo Pellegrino =

American saxophonist

Leonardo Pellegrino
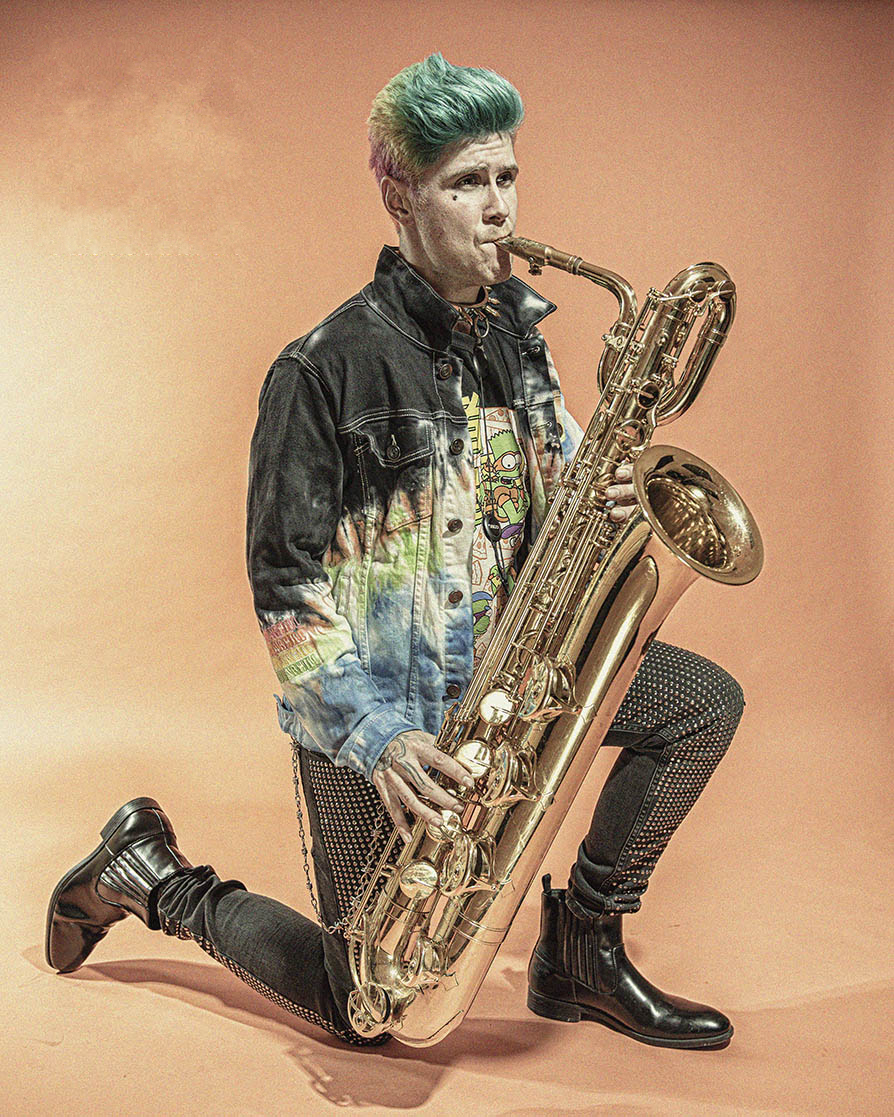
- Pellegrino performing in 2020

Background information
- Born: June 3, 1991 (age 35)
- Origin: Pittsburgh, Pennsylvania, U.S.
- Genres: Jazz, brass house
- Instrument: Baritone saxophone
- Years active: 2014–present
- Member of: Too Many Zooz; 2SAXY; Thundersmack
- Formerly of: Lucky Chops

Leonardo Antonio Pellegrino, also known as Leo P, is an American baritone saxophonist from Pittsburgh who is based in New York City. He is a member of the "brass house" band Too Many Zooz and former member of the Lucky Chops brass band. He is known for his energetic dancing that he performs while playing, often in public areas.

== Early life and education ==
He was born June 3, 1991, in the city of Pittsburgh. He is the youngest son of accordionist and composer Stephen Pellegrino.

Pellegrino graduated from city schools — Pittsburgh Liberty Elementary School (K-5) and Rogers Middle School for the Creative and Performing Arts (CAPA). He got his degree at the Manhattan School of Music in 2013. While at the Manhattan School of Music, Pellegrino recorded with its Afro-Cuban Jazz Orchestra. Scott Yanow's review of the album noted "Pellegrino's use of extreme high notes as punctuation during his passionate solo on 'Let There Be Swing'."

== Career ==
He is a member of the "brass house" band Too Many Zooz and former member of the Lucky Chops brass band. On November 30, 2019, Pellegrino and alto saxophonist Grace Kelly announced a long-term collaboration project known as 2SAXY. In the same year he began a similar collaboration named Thundersmack with Michael Wilbur of Moon Hooch.

Pellegrino is "perhaps best known for his impressive dance moves while performing on the baritone saxophone. A number of videos with Pellegrino have gained wide popularity on YouTube, due in equal parts to his playing, dancing, and vibrant hair and dress styles."

Many videos of Too Many Zooz have gone 'viral' showing the band busking in New York City Subway stations, particularly the always busy Union Square station." Too Many Zooz featured on Beyoncé's 2016 album Lemonade and joined her for a performance of "Daddy Lessons" at the 2016 Country Music Association Awards.

Pellegrino was a guest player with the Metropole Orkest in a 2017 BBC Proms concert on the works of Charles Mingus. John Fordham of The Guardian commented on "Pellegrino's hook-punctuated sax playing and busker's line in simultaneous pirouettes, knee-trembles and high kicks [...] by accident or design, the newcomer did emphasise the joyous impulsiveness of an American musical giant often characterised as only a tortured genius." Pellegrino performed with Too Many Zooz at Ronnie Scott's Jazz Club in London in November 2017.

In 2022, Pellegrino contributed to the soundtrack for the film Babylon.

As of 2025, he was touring as part of Dave Koz's Summer Horns group.

In 2026, Pellegrino contributed to the soundtrack for the live-action adaptation of One Piece as a featured artist for the Season 2 insert song "Whisky Peak Saloon".

== Equipment ==
In March 2019, Pellegrino was announced as a Yamaha artist; he plays a Yamaha YBS-52 baritone saxophone. He endorses the Theo Wanne Durga 5 mouthpiece with an 8* tip opening.
