= List of songs recorded by Lucky Chops =

This is a list of songs recorded by Lucky Chops.

Since 2014, Lucky Chops have released 7 albums, 3 EPs, and 12 singles.

== Official Releases ==
Official Releases by Lucky Chops
Title	Single / EP / Album	Year	Writer(s)	Cover of	Notes
A/B Jam	Virtue and Vice Sessions, Vol. 1 (EP)	2018	-	I'll Fly Away/Heart of Glass/Turn the Beat Around/Aerodynamic/Say You'll Be There /	
Arvory	Single / New Day	2022	Josh Holcomb		Released as a single initially, also featured on New Day
Arvory (Live)	Virtue & Vice Sessions, Vol. 3 (Live)	2024	Josh Holcomb	Arvory (Lucky Chops)	
Battle Hymn	2014	2020	-	Battle Hymn of the Republic	Initially recorded in 2014; released in 2020
Behroozi	NYC	2016	Josh Holcomb		
Best Things	Single	2016	Josh Holcomb		Recorded earlier, but featured on the world tour CD.
Bourbon Street Parade	2014	2020	-	Bourbon Street Parade	Initially recorded in 2014; released in 2020
Brian's Melody	2014	2020	Raphael Buyo		Initially recorded in 2014; released in 2020
Buyo	Single	2016	Group Composition	Buyo (Lucky Chops)	Recorded earlier, but featured on the world tour CD.
Buyo	2014	2020	Group Composition		Initially recorded in 2014; released in 2020
Buyo (Take 1)	2014	2020	Group Composition		Initially recorded in 2014; released in 2020
ChopsQuest 2.0	New Day	2022	Josh Holcomb		
ChopsQuest 2.0 (Live)	Virtue & Vice Sessions, Vol. 3 (Live)	2024	Josh Holcomb	ChopsQuest 2.0 (Lucky Chops)	
Coco - Live	Live at Virtue and Vice Studio (Single)	2015	Josh Holcomb		
Coco (Live In New Jersey)	Virtue & Vice Sessions, Vol. 3 (Live)	2024	Josh Holcomb	Coco (Lucky Chops)	
Coco (Studio Version)	Virtue & Vice Sessions, Vol. 3 (Live)	2024	Josh Holcomb	Coco (Lucky Chops)	
D20	Virtue and Vice Sessions, Vol. 1 (EP)	2018	Daro Behroozi		
Dance Night	Lucky Chops	2019	Joshua Gawel		
Danza 2016	Single	2016	-	Danza 2014 (Lucky Chops)	Recorded earlier, but featured on the world tour CD.
Danza 2014	2014	2020	-	Danza Kuduro / Eye of the Tiger	Initially recorded in 2014; released in 2020
Daro and Charles' Magnificent Journey	Virtue and Vice Sessions, Vol. 1 (EP)	2018	Group Composition		
Don't Let Me Down	Single	2023	-	Don't Let Me Down	
Don't Let Me Down (Live)	Virtue & Vice Sessions, Vol. 3 (Live)	2024	-	Don't Let Me Down (Lucky Chops)	
Familiar Places	Lucky Chops	2019	Joshua Gawel		
Flyway	Lucky Chops	2019	Josh Holcomb		
Flyway (Studio Version)	Virtue and Vice Sessions, Vol. 2	2020	Josh Holcomb		
For Connie	Walter (EP)	2017	Daro Behroozi		
Full Heart Fancy	Single / Lucky Chops	2019	Daro Behroozi		Released as a single initially, also featured on Lucky Chops
Full Heart Fancy (Bonus Track) (Studio Version)	Virtue and Vice Sessions, Vol. 2	2020	Daro Behroozi		Featuring Grace Kelly, Sunny Jain, and Jesse Chevan.
Funkytown/I Feel Good	NYC	2016	-	Funkytown / I Got You (I Feel Good)	
Going Home	Virtue and Vice Sessions, Vol. 1 (EP)	2018	-	Going Home (Lucky Chops)	Initially recorded in 2014; released in 2020
Going Home	2014	2020	-	Going Home (Christian Funeral Hymn)	
Halfway to the Hudson	Lucky Chops	2019	Daro Behroozi		
Halfway to the Hudson (Studio Version)	Virtue and Vice Sessions, Vol. 2	2020	Daro Behroozi		
Hello	Single	2016	-	Hello	Recorded earlier, but featured on the world tour CD.
Helter Skelter	Single / Walter (EP)	2017	-	Helter Skelter	Recorded earlier, but featured on the Walter EP.
Hey Soul Sister	2014	2020	-	Hey, Soul Sister	Initially recorded in 2014; released in 2020
Home Fire	New Day	2022	Joshua Gawel		
Home In The Sky	New Day	2022	Josh Holcomb		
Hoodoos at Sunrise	Virtue and Vice Sessions, Vol. 1 (EP)	2018	Daro Behroozi		
I Want You Back	NYC	2016	-	I Want You Back	
I Want You Back (Live)	Single / Virtue & Vice Sessions, Vol. 3 (Live)	2024	-	I Want You Back (Lucky Chops)	Released as a single initially, also featured on Virtue & Vice 3
I'll Fly Away	NYC	2016	-	I'll Fly Away	
I'm Not the Only One	NYC	2016	-	I'm Not the Only One	
It'd Be Nice	New Day	2022	Joshua Gawel		
It's Not Goodbye	Lucky Chops	2019	Daro Behroozi		
It's Not Goodbye (Studio Version)	Virtue and Vice Sessions, Vol. 2	2020	Daro Behroozi		
Kyle n' Paul	New Day	2022	Daro Behroozi		Played in tours years prior, officially released in 2022
LC Full Blast	New Day	2022	Josh Holcomb		
LC Full Blast (Live)	Virtue & Vice Sessions, Vol. 3 (Live)	2024	Josh Holcomb		
Lean on Me	2014	2020	-	Lean on Me	Initially recorded in 2014; released in 2020
Memories	Lucky Chops	2019	Josh Holcomb		
Memories (Studio Version)	Virtue and Vice Sessions, Vol. 2	2020	Josh Holcomb		
Miami	NYC	2016	Josh Holcomb		
Mo' Momo!	Lucky Chops	2019	Raphael Buyo		
Moonlight Serenade	NYC	2016	-	Moonlight Serenade	
Mr. Charles	Single	2024	Josh Holcomb		
My Girl	NYC	2016	-	My Girl	
My No. 1	Single / New Day	2022	Daro Behroozi		Released as a single initially, also featured on New Day
My No. 1 (Live)	Virtue & Vice Sessions, Vol. 3 (Live)	2024	Daro Behroozi	My No. 1 (Lucky Chops)	
Next to You	NYC	2016	Josh Holcomb		
Next To You (Clarinets Version)	Virtue & Vice Sessions, Vol. 3 (Live)	2024	Josh Holcomb	Next to You (Lucky Chops)	
New Day	New Day	2022	Daro Behroozi		
New Day (Live)	Single / Virtue & Vice Sessions, Vol. 3 (Live)	2024	Daro Behroozi	New Day (Lucky Chops)	Released as a single initially, also featured on Virtue & Vice 3
Pizza Day	Lucky Chops	2019	Josh Holcomb		
Pizza Day (Studio Version)	Virtue and Vice Sessions, Vol. 2	2020	Josh Holcomb		
Problem	NYC	2016	-	Problem	
Stand	Walter (EP)	2017	Daro Behroozi		
Stand By Me (Live)	Virtue & Vice Sessions, Vol. 3 (Live)	2024	-	Stand by Me	
Temple of Boom	Walter (EP)	2017	Group Composition		
The Dancing Babies	Lucky Chops	2019	Josh Holcomb		
The Dancing Babies (Studio Version)	Virtue and Vice Sessions, Vol. 2	2020	Josh Holcomb		
These Tears	Virtue and Vice Sessions, Vol. 1 (EP)	2018	Daro Behroozi		
Traveler	Lucky Chops	2019	Joshua Gawel		
Traveler (Studio Version)	Virtue and Vice Sessions, Vol. 2	2020	Joshua Gawel		
Traveler II: The Path	New Day	2022	Joshua Gawel		
Walter Jam	Walter (EP)	2017	Group Arrangement		
Without You (4 Tonite)	Live at Virtue and Vice Studio (Single)	2015	Daro Behroozi		Recorded earlier, but featured on the world tour CD.
Without You (4 Tonite) (Live)	Virtue & Vice Sessions, Vol. 3 (Live)	2024	Daro Behroozi	Without You (4 Tonite) (Lucky Chops)	

== Songs not Released as a Single or on an Album/EP ==
- Ska Ba
- Longa
- Mercy, Mercy, Mercy
- Like Glue/Angel/All Star
- Treasure
- "Sky Song" (original)
- "Applebees" (original)
- "Young One" (original)
- Fontaine's Theme
