= Crimson Dawn (disambiguation) =

Crimson Dawn is a fictional realm in the Marvel Comics Universe.

Crimson Dawn may also refer to:

== People ==
- Crimson Dawn (character), a fictional character in the DC Comics Universe, see List of Secret Six members

== Literature ==
- The Crimson Dawn (novel) a 1957 novel by Abul Fazal
- Crimson Dawn (short story) a 1995 Doctor Who story by Tim Robins published in Decalog 2: Lost Property, see Virgin Decalog
- Psylocke & Archangel: Crimson Dawn (comic book) a 1997 Marvel Comics limited series, see List of X-Men limited series and one-shots

== Other uses ==
- Crimson Dawn (fictional organization) a fictional crime syndicate led by Darth Maul in the Star Wars universe
- "Crimson Dawn" (song) a 2008 single by Seth Lakeman
- Crimson Dawn (band), a fictional band featured in the South Park episode "Band in China"

== See also ==
- Land of the Crimson Dawn, a power metal album by Freedom Call
- Red Sky at Morning (disambiguation)
- Red Dawn (disambiguation)
- Krasnaya Zarya (disambiguation), Russian for "Crimson Dawn"
