= My Girl's Pussy =

Song by British bandleader and clarinetist Harry Roy

Single by Harry Roy and His Bat Club Boys
- B-side: "If You Haven't Got Love"
- Released: August 1931
- Recorded: 1931
- Studio: Levy's Sound Studios, London, England
- Genre: Jazz, Novelty
- Length: 3:10
- Label: Oriole Records (UK)
- Composer: Harry Roy
- Lyricist: Harry Roy

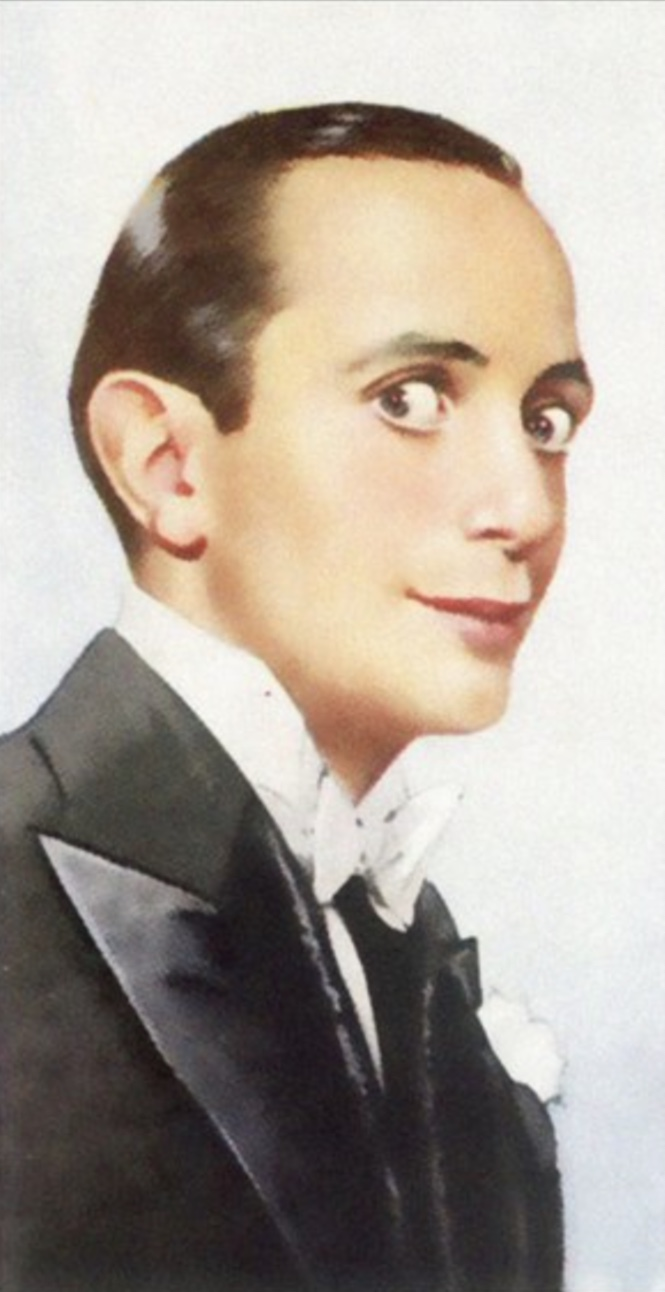
c. 1934 cigarette card of Roy

"My Girl's Pussy" (or simply "Pussy!") (Note: The title appears as 'PUSSY!', in capital letters, on the label of the original 78 rpm record.) is a 1931 jazz song recorded by the British bandleader and clarinetist Harry Roy and His Bat Club Boys.

The lyrics play on the two meanings of the word pussy (i.e. cat/female genitalia) in a series of double entendres.

Harry Roy is credited with both the lyrics and the music, and he is the singer on this track.

== Release ==
The song was released in August 1931 by Oriole Records (UK), described by the record company as a "fox trot with vocal chorus". It was the A-side of the record, with 'If You Haven't Got Love' (Note: ’If You Haven’t Got Love’ was originally sung by Gloria Swanson in Indiscreet, a film that had come out in May the same year.) on the B-side.

=== Description ===
The track duration is approximately three minutes and ten seconds.

It opens on sounds imitating a cat's meowing (after a few bars), followed by the theme before the vocal part starts, developed in two sequences separated by a piano solo.

=== Background ===
The song was performed by Roy and his ad hoc orchestra at The Bat club on Albermarle Street, where it became the club's "unofficial anthem" in the early 1930s.

=== On more recent genre compilations ===
"My Girl's Pussy" later appeared on various dirty blues compilation albums, such as The Copulatin' Blues, Volume Two, The Ultimate Dirty Blues collection, Risqué blues (vol.1) and Baby How Can It Be? Songs of Love, Lust and Contempt From the 1920s and 1930s.

== Lyrics ==
The lyrics develop constant puns on the sexual connotation of the title word, such as:

There's one pet I like to pet / And every evening we get set / I stroke it every chance I get / It's my girl's pussy

== Cover versions ==
"My Girl's Pussy" was covered in 1976 by Ian Whitcomb, in 1978 by R. Crumb & His Cheap Suit Serenaders, in 1981 by Bob Kerr and His Whoopee Band, in 2004 by Kitten on the Keys, and in 2007 by Blag Dahlia among others.

=== Use in films and series ===
"My Girl's Pussy" was on the soundtrack of the 2004 film Head in the Clouds, performed by John Duigan. Its cover version by R. Crumb and his Cheap Suit Serenaders was used as the theme song to the Australian Broadcasting Corporation's series Laid in 2011–12. It was sung by the character of Ben Siegel during his capture/kidnapping in the 5th season of Boardwalk Empire (2015). It also features in the first episode of the MGM+ limited series A Spy Among Friends.

==== In Babylon (2022) ====
The song appears in the 2022 film Babylon, in the first sequence, sung by Lady Fay Zhu, a character based upon Anna May Wong and portrayed by Li Jun Li. Its original version also can be heard partially in a later scene of the film, (Note: Albeit not present on the soundtrack album, as considered incidental music.) during which the song is played on a phonograph in a subterranean gathering space.

== See also ==
- 1931 in British music; 1931 in jazz
- Babylon (film soundtrack)
