= Babylon (soundtrack) =

Babylon (Music from the Motion Picture)

Film score by Justin Hurwitz
- Released: December 9, 2022
- Recorded: 2019–2022
- Studios: Capitol Studios, United Recording, Sony, Ferber
- Genres: Jazz; contemporary classical
- Length: 1:37:15
- Label: Interscope
- Producer: Justin Hurwitz

Justin Hurwitz chronology
First Man (2018)	Babylon (2022)

Singles from Babylon (Music from the Motion Picture)
- 1. "Call Me Manny" Released: November 11, 2022; 2. "Voodoo Mama" Released: November 11, 2022

Babylon (Music from the Motion Picture) is the score album to the 2022 film of the same name directed by Damien Chazelle. The original music composed and conducted by Justin Hurwitz, Chazelle's frequent collaborator, which is set for release on December 9, 2022 by Interscope Records, two weeks ahead of the film's release on December 23, features 48 tracks running over an hour. Two of the tracks "Call Me Manny" and "Voodoo Mama" were released on November 11.

== Background ==
The film marked the fifth project in the collaboration of Chazelle and Hurwitz together, after Guy and Madeline on a Park Bench (2009), Whiplash (2014), La La Land (2016) and First Man (2018). Hurwitz nearly worked on Babylon for three years to create a "unique musical universe" that is believable enough for the 1920s, but also "a far cry from the quaint jazz of the period", which was a "challenge" for the composer. He created a "fresh concoction that matched the wild, hedonistic world of the film", by using jazz band instruments in more contemporary ways, drawing inspiration from rock and roll, and modern dance music. The soundtrack also includes pieces scored for a "manic" 100-piece orchestra recorded in Los Angeles, as well as other cues scores with circus sounds. Hurwitz said that "a huge part of scoring process was to find unique musicians to bring it to life" and credited musicians Sean Jones, Dontae Winslow, Ludovic Louis, Jacob Scesney, and Leo Pellegrino for their contribution to the score.

The score was published by Interscope Records which released Hurwitz's Academy Award-winning soundtrack for La La Land. Interscope officially announced the album on November 10, 2022 and its pre-orders of the soundtrack, set for December 9 release. The following day, two songs—"Call Me Manny" and "Voodoo Mama" were released for preview. "Call Me Manny" plays during the furor over Manny's (Diego Calva) latest gig, while "Voodoo Mama" is played as Nellie LaRoy (Margot Robbie) "takes over the dance floor at the party" when the film starts. The track underscored the film's trailer that released on September.

== Promotion ==
Babylon Jazz Night at Delilah event was held at Delilah in West Hollywood, California on December 11, 2022, hosted by Paramount Pictures, Interscope and Los Angeles-based The h.wood Group, to promote the film. The event featured an orchestra band led by Hurwitz, the cast members, along with a dance party with the guests. H.wood also provides on-theme décor and atmosphere to "reflect the backdrop reflective of the vibes and aesthetic of the roaring 20s and old Hollywood through a modern lens".

== Track listing ==
No.	Title	Length
1.	"Welcome"	4:00
2.	"Manny and Nellie's Theme"	0:53
3.	"King of the Circus"	2:28
4.	"Jub Jub"	0:56
5.	"Coke Room"	2:31
6.	"My Girl's Pussy"	2:29
7.	"Miss Idaho"	0:55
8.	"Voodoo Mama"	3:59
9.	"Gold Coast Rhythm (Wallach Party)"	1:41
10.	"Ain't Life Grand"	1:38
11.	"Babylon"	0:30
12.	"Morning"	2:00
13.	"Kinescope Ragtime Piano"	0:35
14.	"Kinescope Erhu (Orientally Yours)"	1:28
15.	"Kinescope Carnival Music"	0:49
16.	"Kinescope Organ Music"	0:45
17.	"Night on Bald Mountain"	2:08
18.	"Herman's Hustle"	2:02
19.	"Gold Coast Sunset"	2:00
20.	"Champagne"	2:55
21.	"Wild Child"	3:03
22.	"New York"	2:02
23.	"See You Back in LA"	0:48
24.	"Red Devil"	1:56
25.	"I Want a Man"	2:02
26.	"Orientally Yours"	2:11
27.	"Gimme"	1:32
28.	"Singin' in the Rain"	1:22
29.	"Pharoah John"	0:39
30.	"Meet Miss LaRoy"	0:39
31.	"Call Me Manny"	3:37
32.	"Hearst Party"	6:41
33.	"Damascus Thump"	2:10
34.	"All Figured Out"	0:55
35.	"Nea Smyrni"	2:03
36.	"Waikele Tango"	3:38
37.	"Toad"	2:01
38.	"Blockhouse"	2:10
39.	"Jack's Party Band"	1:34
40.	"Gold Coast Rhythm (Jack's Party)"	1:42
41.	"Levántate"	0:34
42.	"Señor Avocado"	2:23
43.	"Heyo"	3:00
44.	"Gold Coast Rhythm (Juan Bonilla)"	2:56
45.	"Te Amo Nellie"	1:31
46.	"Gold Coast Rhythm (Sidney's Solo)"	2:47
47.	"Manny and Nellie's Theme (Reprise)"	0:45
48.	"Finale"	3:51
Total length:		1:37:15

== Reception ==
=== Critical response ===
The first two preview tracks, "Call Me Manny" and "Voodoo Mama" were reviewed by Rolling Stone's Jon Blistein who mentioned it as "pulsating blasts of hot jazz stuffed with thundering drums and boozy horns". At the special screening of the film, press critics praised Hurwitz's score, with Jeff Nelson calling it as "one hell of a wall of sound".

Music critic Jonathan Broxton wrote "while Justin Hurwitz's music enhances the magnificent extravagance of that life and that time, it makes sure it doesn't overlook the pain and the pathos either." Filmtracks.com reviewed "the soundtrack for Babylon is smart dysfunction by design, Hurwitz opting for insanity as a method of enhancing the overstimulating nature of the movie. The 97-minute album is an amusing but ultimately exhausting and defeating experience. It's the kind of work that makes you laugh and shake your head while vowing never to revisit it again."

In August 2023, IndieWire ranked the film's score at number 15 on its list of "The 40 Best Movie Scores of the 21st Century," writing "Filled with booming trumpets and epic saxophone solos, it's a truly epic score, perfectly fitting the changing world of '20s and '30s Los Angeles perfectly. But it's the way the score builds upon its motifs and elements from song to song, that makes its special."

=== Industry reactions ===
The film received attention from industry members in the 2023 award season, highlighting the possibilities of award nominations at major ceremonies. Hurwitz's score has been highlighted by critics from various publications, as the possible contender for the Academy Award for Best Original Score at the 95th Academy Awards, with Paul Sheehan of GoldDerby analysing that the score has been the leading contenders for that category. Aside Academy Awards, the score will also be a major contender for the 80th Golden Globe Awards, highlighted by Variety's Clayton Davis. It would later win the Best Original Score category.

=== Awards and nominations ===
Award	Date of ceremony	Category	Recipient(s)	Result
Chicago Film Critics Association	December 14, 2022	Best Original Score	Justin Hurwitz	Won
St. Louis Gateway Film Critics Association	December 18, 2022	Best Score	Justin Hurwitz	Nominated
Florida Film Critics Circle	December 22, 2022	Best Score	Justin Hurwitz	Won
San Francisco Bay Area Film Critics Circle	January 9, 2023	Best Original Score	Justin Hurwitz	Nominated
Austin Film Critics Association	January 10, 2023	Best Score	Justin Hurwitz	Won
Golden Globe Awards	January 10, 2023	Best Original Score	Justin Hurwitz	Won
Georgia Film Critics Association	January 13, 2023	Best Original Score	Justin Hurwitz	Runner-up
Critics' Choice Movie Awards	January 15, 2023	Best Score	Justin Hurwitz	Nominated
Seattle Film Critics Society	January 17, 2023	Best Original Score	Justin Hurwitz	Won
Hollywood Critics Association Creative Arts Awards	February 17, 2023	Best Score	Justin Hurwitz	Won
Houston Film Critics Society	February 18, 2023	Best Original Score	Justin Hurwitz	Nominated
British Academy Film Awards	February 19, 2023	Best Original Score	Justin Hurwitz	Nominated
Satellite Awards	March 3, 2023	Best Original Score	Justin Hurwitz	Won
Academy Awards	March 12, 2023	Best Original Score	Justin Hurwitz	Nominated
