= Too Many Zooz =

American music group

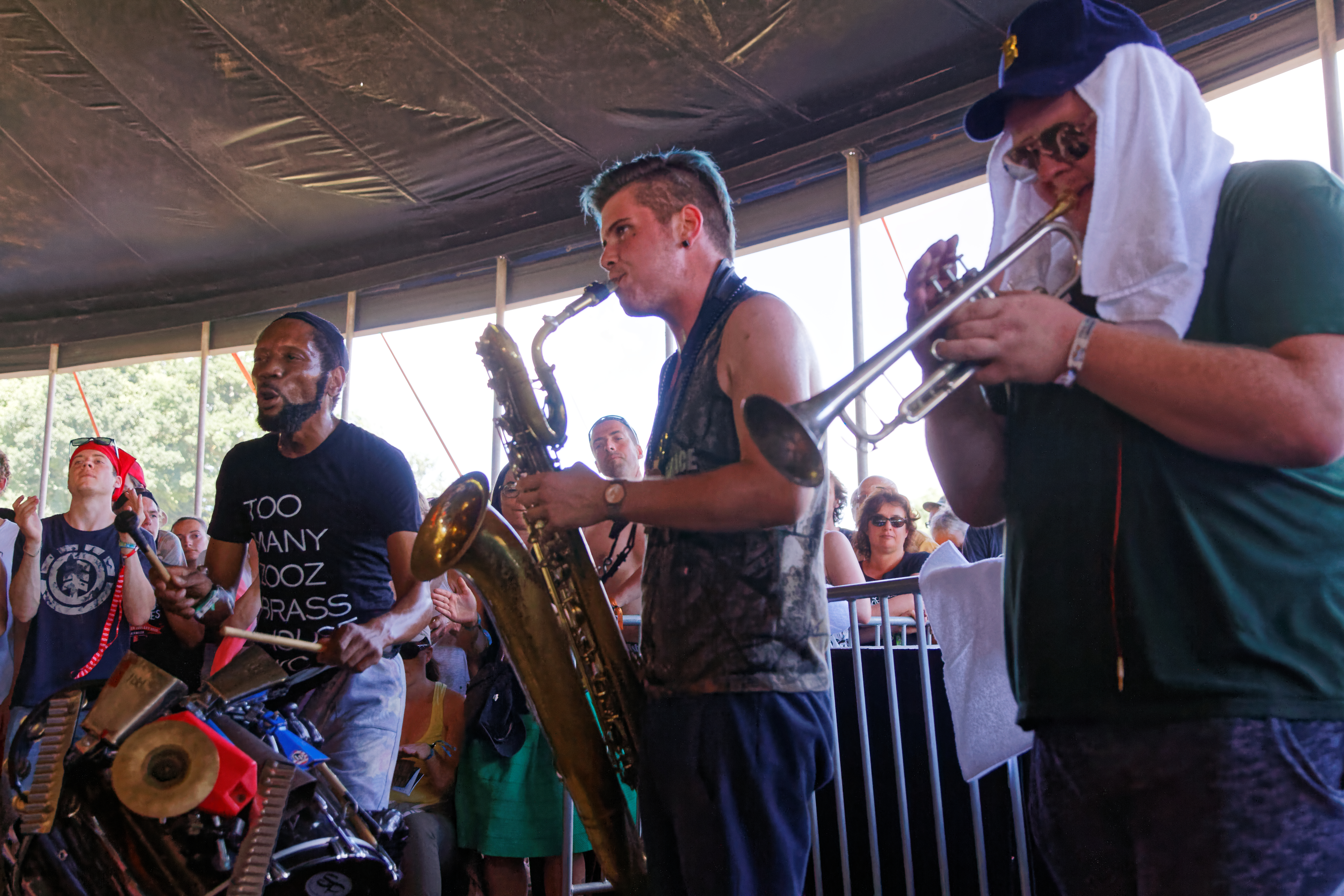
- Too Many Zooz performing in 2016

Background information
- Origin: New York City, U.S.
- Genres: Brass house (self-defined)
- Years active: 2013–present
- Members: Leo Pellegrino; Matt Muirhead; David Parks
- Website: toomanyzooz.com

Too Many Zooz is an American music group based in New York City, consisting of Leo Pellegrino (baritone saxophone), Matt "Doe" Muirhead (trumpet), and David "King of Sludge" Parks (drums).

== Formation and viral fame ==
Pellegrino and Muirhead met at the Manhattan School of Music, which they were both attending. Pellegrino and Parks had played together in Drumadics, a local busking band. Teaming up in mid-2013, the trio started busking together at various stations in the New York City Subway, playing a style they call "brass house". The trio defines it as a mix of jazz, Afro-Cuban rhythms, funk, EDM, and house music.

Too Many Zooz gained fame when a video of one of their subway performances, recorded by a passerby at the Union Square station, went viral on YouTube in March 2014.

== Stage and studio ==
Too Many Zooz recorded an EP, F NOTE, in January 2014, which they sold at their busking performances. They went on to release three more EPs: Fanimals (2014), Brasshouse Volume 1: Survival of the Flyest (2014), and The Internet (EP) (2015).

By January 2015, the trio was booked on a tour at theaters and small clubs across the United States. They played backup for Beyoncé and the Dixie Chicks in their televised CMA Awards performance on November 2, 2016, in Nashville.

Kaskade's July 2016 single "Jorts FTW" features Too Many Zooz.

The band's first full-length studio album, Subway Gawdz, came out on June 27, 2016, and received mixed-to-positive reviews. The song "Warriors", from the album, was featured in a Google commercial for the Pixel 2 phone in October 2017. The track was also heard during the flag parade of the Eurovision Song Contest 2018 Grand Final. KFC featured the song "Brnx Bmbr" in one of their commercials.

Too Many Zooz released the EPs A Very Too Many Zooz Xmas in 2018 and ZombiEP in 2019, and in 2024, they issued their second full-length album, Retail Therapy.

== Band members ==
- Leo "Leo P" Pellegrino – baritone saxophone
- Matt "Doe" Muirhead – trumpet
- David "King of Sludge" Parks – drums

== Discography ==
Studio albums

- Subway Gawdz (2016)
- Retail Therapy (2024)

EPs

- F NOTE (2014)
- Fanimals (2014)
- Brasshouse Volume 1: Survival of the Flyest (2014)
- The Internet (2015)
- A Very Too Many Zooz Xmas (2018)
- ZombiEP (2019)
- Red Apple Gift Shop (2025)

Music videos

- "Bedford"
- "Warriors" (2018)
- "Car Alarm" (2018)
- "Trundle Manor" (2018)
- "Pink Yesterday" (2020)
- "Rake Stepper" (2023)
- "Mad" (2024)
- "Nowhere Else to Go" – featuring Moon Hooch (2024)
