= Red Dawn (disambiguation) =

Red Dawn is a 1984 film by John Milius.

Red Dawn may also refer to:

== Entertainment ==
- L'Aube rouge (novel) (French for Red Dawn), a historical novel by Jean-Joseph Rabearivelo
- Red Dawn (2012 film), a remake of the 1984 film
- "Red Dawn" (X-Men: The Animated Series), an episode from the second season of the X-Men animated series
- "Red Dawn", a third season episode of Sealab 2021
- Red Dawn (audio drama), a 2000 Doctor Who audio drama
- "Red Dawn", the sixth movement of the 1992 Mike Oldfield album Tubular Bells II
- "Red Dawn" (Supergirl), an episode of Supergirl
- "Red Dawn" (American Horror Story), an episode of the ninth season of American Horror Story

== Other ==
- Red Color, a system used to alert Israeli civilians about impending rocket attacks, known until 2007 as "Red Dawn"
- Operation Red Dawn, a military operation conducted by the United States Armed Forces resulting in the capture of Saddam Hussein
- Dawn Primarolo, the Labour MP for Bristol South, who is nicknamed "Red Dawn"
- Weather lore, for folk meaning of a red colored dawn

== See also ==
- Red Sky at Morning (disambiguation)
- Crimson Dawn (disambiguation)
- Krasnaya Zarya (disambiguation), for names related to its translation into Russian
- Rojo Amanecer, a 1989 Mexican film
