= Krasnaya Zarya =

Krasnaya Zarya may refer to:

- Krasnaya Zarya (rural locality), several rural localities in Russia
- Krasnaya Zarya Leningrad (later Krasnaya Zarya St. Petersburg), former names of BSK Saint Petersburg, a defunct Russian bandy club
- Krasnaya Zarya Leningrad, former name of FC Elektrosila Leningrad, a defunct Russian association football club

== See also ==
- Red Dawn (disambiguation), for names related to the translation of the term
