= Whitey on the Moon =

1970 spoken word poem by Gil Scott-Heron

External audio
- "Whitey on the Moon" on YouTube

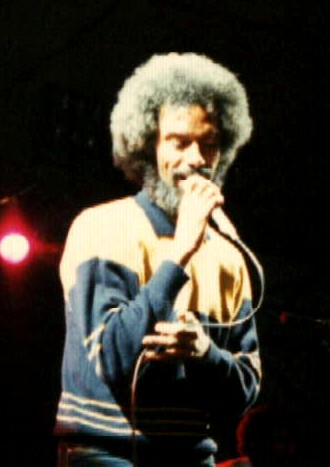
Gil Scott-Heron in 1986

"Whitey on the Moon" is a spoken word poem by Gil Scott-Heron, released as the ninth track on his debut album Small Talk at 125th and Lenox in 1970. Accompanied by conga drums, Scott-Heron's narrative tells of medical debt, high taxes and poverty experienced at the time of the Apollo Moon landings. The poem critiques the resources spent on the space program while Black Americans were experiencing social and economic disparities at home.

"Whitey on the Moon" was prominently featured in the 2018 biographical film about Neil Armstrong, First Man, and "Whitey's on the Moon", the second episode of HBO's 2020 television series Lovecraft Country. It received renewed interest in 2021 following spaceflights by billionaires Jeff Bezos and Richard Branson, which were seen as emblematic of the inequities highlighted by the poem.

== Background, recording, and content ==
Gil Scott-Heron was a poet, jazz musician, scholar, and novelist of Jamaican and African American descent. His 1970 debut album, Small Talk at 125th and Lenox, contained spoken word pieces that showcased his many literary and musical influences, including Langston Hughes, Malcolm X, and the Last Poets. Scott-Heron stated that he was inspired to write "Whitey on the Moon" by a statement from writer and activist Eldridge Cleaver, who argued that the space program was intended to distract the United States from problems within, and to suppress discontent. Scott-Heron wrote the poem in the summer of 1969. His mother, Bobbie Scott, suggested the refrain and the closing line.

"Whitey on the Moon" was released as the ninth track on Small Talk at 125th and Lenox, which was recorded late in the summer of 1970 in a studio belonging to Atlantic Records. Scott-Heron speaks the poem alongside a conga drum accompaniment of a sort common in street poetry, and used by contemporaneous artists such as The Last Poets. The track is just under two minutes long. Although the album has been frequently described as being recorded live in a nightclub in New York City, it was in fact recorded in a studio, with an audience present to simulate a live crowd. "Whitey on the Moon" narrates the story of Scott-Heron's "sister Nell," who is bitten by a rat while Neil Armstrong lands on the Moon. It then talks of medical debt that is incurred for her treatment, and rising costs of basic necessities as a result of the Moon landings. It ends with the sarcastic promise that when the next bills arrive, Scott-Heron would send them by "air mail special to Whitey on the Moon". The first lines of the poem run as follows:

A rat done bit my sister Nell.
(with Whitey on the Moon)
Her face and arms began to swell.
(and Whitey's on the Moon)
I can't pay no doctor bill.
(but Whitey's on the Moon)
Ten years from now I'll be paying still.
(while Whitey's on the Moon)

== Analysis and reception ==
"Whitey on the Moon" became exceptionally popular among African-Americans in inner city neighborhoods in New York, Detroit, and Los Angeles. While the album, described by AllMusic as a "volcanic upheaval of intellectualism and social critique", did not receive much airtime, it received considerable attention in Black and progressive neighborhoods across the US. Its criticism of the Space Race was broadly similar to that featured by the Black-owned print media, but drew far greater attention among that community. It featured thematic commonalities with Marvin Gaye's 1971 song "Inner City Blues (Make Me Wanna Holler)", and Faith Ringgold's 1969 painting titled "Flag for the Moon: Die Nigger". The poem's popularity was described as evidence of growing awareness of the struggles of urban blight in the US. While Small Talk at 125th and Lenox did not chart, it earned enough attention for Flying Dutchman Records to authorize a second Scott-Heron album, Pieces of a Man in 1971.

"Whitey on the Moon" is described as exemplifying afrofuturism, or "Black social thought concerning 'culture, technology, and things to come'." Scott-Heron saw the Apollo landings as exemplifying racial disparities in the US. The poem critiques the US space program by connecting its use of government funds to the marginalization of Black Americans. The poem identifies government neglect as the root cause of poverty while questioning the benefits and beneficiaries of the space program. The connection that Scott-Heron implies between capitalism in the US and poverty, environmental destruction, and militarism, is a theme found in many of his other works. During the 1970s, the view that the country was spending too much on its space program was widespread in the US, and was shared by politicians including President Richard Nixon. A majority of the US public was against the expenses for the space program, a stance called "moondoggle". This criticism of the space program has been described as reaching its epitome in "Whitey on the Moon."

Scott-Heron's handling of difficult material with dark humour has been praised by commentators. Writing for The Atlantic after Scott-Heron's death in 2011, Alexis Madrigal stated that "Whitey on the Moon" had taken spaceflight out of the "abstract, universal realm in which we like to place our technical achievements". Madrigal added that the poem raised questions about "which America" got the "glory of the moon landing", and of what the costs of putting "whitey on the moon" were. A 2014 biography of Scott-Heron described "Whitey on the Moon" as a "gem of a prose poem" that was well-received critically, and that it was "devastating in its harsh counterpoint" to adulatory coverage of the Moon landings. Also writing in 2021, MSNBC columnist Tal Lavin stated that the poem "memorialized, in sardonic fashion, the saccharine patriotism that had arisen around Apollo 11". Also in 2021, a review of Scott-Heron's work commented: "Rarely has a point been made so forcefully while artfully avoiding the full brutal bludgeon of the nose."

== Legacy ==
The 2018 film First Man, a biographical film about Neil Armstrong, prominently features "Whitey on the Moon". Director Damien Chazelle and writer Josh Singer sought to portray the "passionate feelings" of those opposed to the cost of the program: Singer stated he was interested in "pulling the veneer off" of what had been a "pretty sugarcoated story". In the film, the poem is read over footage of the Apollo 1 disaster and of people protesting the space program. It was performed by Leon Bridges, and included on the movie's soundtrack album. The poem is also used prominently in the second episode of HBO's series Lovecraft Country. The episode, which is titled "Whitey's on the Moon", debuted on August 23, 2020.

"Whitey on the Moon" received renewed attention in 2021 following spaceflights by billionaires Jeff Bezos and Richard Branson in July 2021. 2021 was also the year Scott-Heron was inducted into the Rock and Roll Hall of Fame. Commentators wrote that the piece was particularly topical, given the billions of dollars spent on the spaceflights in a time of social and economic inequality. A piece on The Conversation said that the "whitey" of the poem could represent any of the billionaires, as the poem highlighted the economic inequalities upon which their wealth was built, and which allowed them to be space tourists. An opinion piece in Vice magazine stated that the question of "precisely who is going to space, why, and at what cost?", which ran through Scott-Heron's poem, remained relevant. An opinion piece from MSNBC argued that the racial inequalities the poem highlighted remained in place, emphasized by the COVID-19 pandemic, which had had a particularly large impact upon people of color.

On April 17, 2023, NASA astronaut Victor Glover, who would later pilot Artemis II in a planned fly-by around the Moon, said that he listened to "Whitey on the Moon" every Monday on his way to work as a reminder "that, at that time, that community, which is very similar to the community I grew up in, they didn't feel heard."
