= Red Sky (Moon Hooch album) =

Studio album by Moon Hooch
- Released: June 10, 2016
- Genre: Dance, jazz, techno
- Length: 47:45
- Label: Hornblow/Palmetto Records

Moon Hooch chronology
This Is Cave Music (2014)	Red Sky (2016)	The Joshua Tree - EP (2017)

Professional ratings
Review scores
Source	Rating
The Guardian	3/5 stars
Consequence of Sound	B
NPR	Positive

Red Sky is the third album by American jazz trio Moon Hooch, released on June 10, 2016 by Hornblow/Palmetto Records.

== Track listing ==
All songs composed by Moon Hooch.

No.	Title	Length
1.	"Red Sky"	3:26
2.	"That's What They Say"	3:52
3.	"Sunken Ship"	4:03
4.	"Low 5"	4:02
5.	"Psychotubes"	3:01
6.	"On the Sun"	4:06
7.	"Booty House"	2:54
8.	"Shot"	3:58
9.	"Something Else"	3:55
10.	"Rough Sex"	4:14
11.	"The Thought"	3:04
12.	"Alien Invasion"	3:19
13.	"Broken Tooth"	3:51
Total length:		47:45

== Personnel ==
Moon Hooch

- James Muschler - drums, tabla, synthesizers
- Michael Wilbur - tenor saxophone, soprano saxophone, synthesizers, bass saxophone, vocals
- Wenzl McGowen - tenor saxophone, baritone saxophone, contrabass clarinet, synthesizers
