= Red Sky at Morning =

"Red sky at morning" is a part of a common verse meant to help predict weather.

Red Sky at Morning may refer to:

== Film ==
- Red Sky at Morning (1971 film), a film based on the Bradford novel
- Red Sky at Morning (1944 film), a drama by Australian author Dymphna Cusack

== Literature ==
- Red Sky at Morning (play), a 1935 Australian stage play by Dymphna Cusack
- Red Sky at Morning (Kennedy novel), a 1927 novel by Margaret Kennedy
- Red Sky in the Morning, 1935 book by Robert P. T. Coffin
- Red in the Morning, 1946 novel by Dornford Yates
- Red Sky at Morning (Bradford novel), a 1968 novel by Richard Bradford
- Red Sky in the Morning, 1988 novel by Elizabeth Laird
- Red Sky at Morning (Speth book), a 2004 book by James Gustave Speth

== Other uses ==
- "Red Sky at Morning" (Supernatural), an episode of the television series Supernatural
- "Red Sky in the Morning", an episode of the television series The Mentalist

== See also ==
- Red sky at night (disambiguation)
- Crimson Dawn (disambiguation)
- Red Dawn (disambiguation)
