= Red Skye Comics =

- Industry: Publishing
- Founded: 2003
- Products: Comics

Red Skye Comics is an American comic book line originally published by Exit Entertainment Group.

Red Skye Comics features a variety of comic book characters alongside an assortment of independent and professional female models. Among the notable models included in the Red Skye Comics roster are Playboy Playmates and Playboy Models Cathy St. George, Tina Jordan, Divini Rae, Michelle Baena, Koa Marie Turner, Malisia Petropoulos, Shannon Shay, and Stacey Hayes; actresses/models Alexis Skye, Suzi Lorraine, Monique Dupree, Lani Lane, Amy Kerr, Sophia Santi and Diamond Kitty, models Bambi Lashell, Lisa Perry and Sun Karma. Red Skye comic book characters developed for publication have incorporated all styles and genre of fiction. Character types have included goddesses, spies, vampire hunters, time travelers, fairies, crime fighters and superheroes.

Red Skye most notable characters include, Saint 7, a secret agent and spy; Amazon-X, a superhero with the ability to increase her height; Sin-Su, an Asian warrior who battles vampires; and Ms. Justice, a superhero with super-human abilities of strength and flight. Red Skye, within their overall stories and publications, has also included historical personalities, fictional characters from the public domain and classic literature such as Adolf Hitler, Count Dracula, the goddess Rhiannon, the goddess Venus, the goddess Isis, Tiger Woman, Morgan Le Fey, Merlin, Mordred, Ares, Chronos and Athena. Most of Red Skye's fictional characters are depicted as inhabiting a single shared world; this continuity is known as the Red Skye Universe.

Red Skye Comics was founded in 2003. In 2004, Red Skye Comics signed their first models, Shawna and Jennifer Bucci (The Bucci Twins) and Cathy St. George to launch their flagship series Red Skye Comics Presents. This series would go on to introduce a new model and character with each issue. Other publications currently produced by Red Skye Comics featuring both Red Skye characters and models include The Agents of Justice, SGU: Spy Girls Undercover, The BLOOD Slayers and Tales of The Red Skye Universe.
