= Red sky at night =

Red sky at night or Red Sky at Night may refer to:

- An example of weather lore; see Red sky at morning
- "Red Sky at Night", a song by David Gilmour from the album On an Island
- "Red Sky at Night", a song by Focus from the album Ship of Memories
- Red Sky at Night (play), 2022 play by Lindsay Rodden for Mikron Theatre Company
- Rosso di sera, a 2022 film by Emanuele Mengotti

== See also ==
- Red Sky at Morning (disambiguation)
- "Red Skies", a 1982 song by The Fixx
