= Moon Hooch =

American jazz fusion band

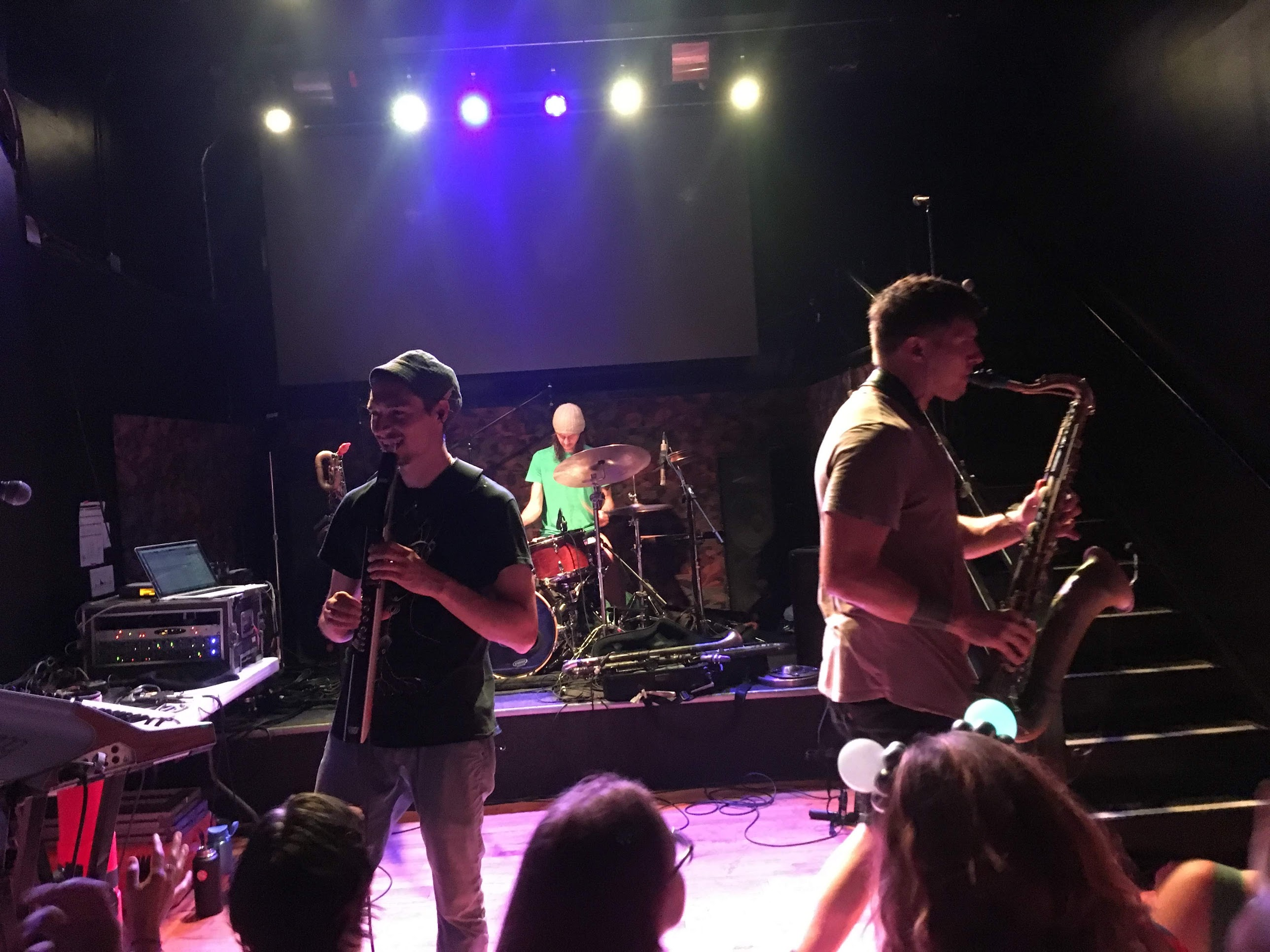
- Moon Hooch in 2019.

Background information
- Origin: Brooklyn, New York
- Genres: Jazz fusion, nu jazz
- Years active: 2010–present
- Members: Wenzl McGowen; Michael Wilbur; Cyzon Griffin
- Past members: James Muschler; Ethan Snyder; Jules Jenssen
- Website: moonhooch.com

Moon Hooch is an American band from Brooklyn, New York, known for their dance-oriented percussion- and saxophone-based music. The band consists of saxophonists Wenzl McGowen and Michael Wilbur, and drummer Cyzon Griffin. The two woodwind players, along with original drummer James Muschler, met while attending The New School for Jazz and Contemporary Music, and got their start busking in New York City Subway stations.

Their self-titled debut album was released in 2013 and peaked at number 9 on the Billboard Jazz Albums chart. Their second album This Is Cave Music was released on September 16, 2014. and reached number 5 on the Billboard Jazz Albums chart.

== History ==
=== Early years ===
The band first started busking in 2010, playing in front of the Metropolitan Museum of Art. The band started out playing mostly jazz, but then moved to dance music after a better audience reception. Later, they decided to busk in the New York City Subway. In the process they were banned from the Bedford Avenue station by the NYPD, who tried to prevent people from dancing on the platform edge. In 2011, they appeared as the house band on the Australian TV series Hamish and Andy's Gap Year where they were re-christened "The Busketeers". Their album artwork is designed by Ari Michael Warner.

=== 2013–2015 ===
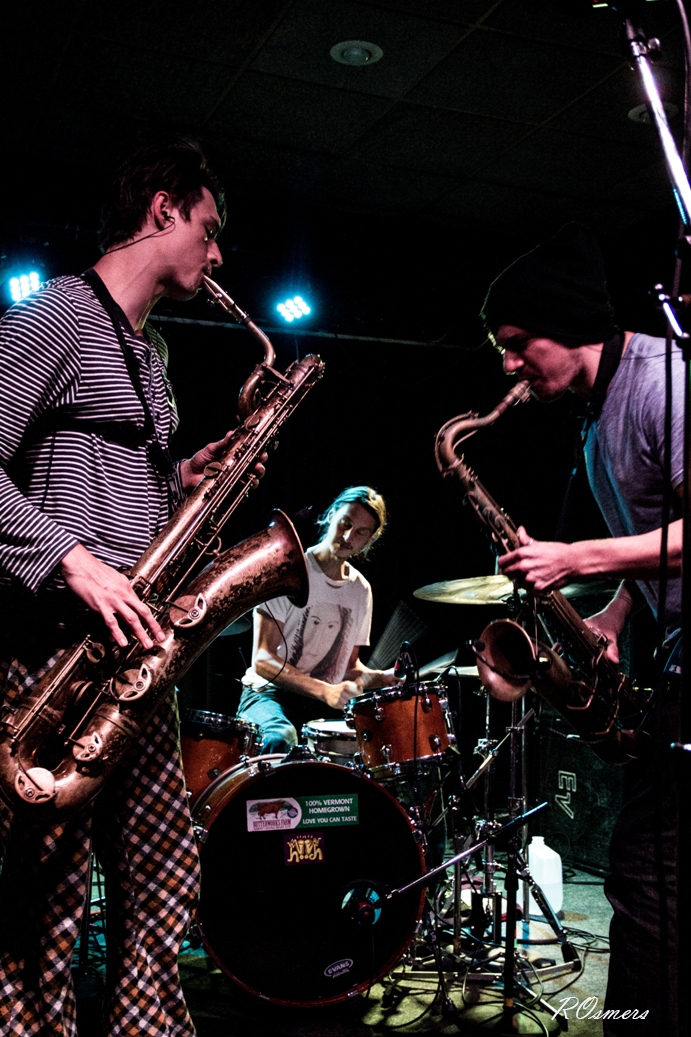
Moon Hooch in 2014.

After gaining a reputation from busking, Moon Hooch started to release albums, beginning with their self-titled debut on June 25, 2013. It was recorded in a 24-hour period at Bunker Studio in Brooklyn, and most of the copies were sold while the band was still busking. Their second album, This is Cave Music, was released on September 16, 2014, and was the first to use synthesizers, post-production work, and vocals. It received positive reviews, and many reviewers commented on the band's unique style. Their next album, Red Sky, would continue to use the same elements pioneered in This is Cave Music. Moon Hooch has been influential in the “brass house” genre, as well as pushing the boundaries of jazz.

In July 2014, they performed a Tiny Desk Concert at NPR in Washington, D.C.

=== 2016–2024 ===
The band released their first EP, The Joshua Tree, in early 2017. Their second EP, Light It Up, was released on April 6, 2018, via Hornblow Recordings. The short three track EP was announced alongside the video for the first single of the album, "Acid Mountain."

On November 5, 2019, Moon Hooch released the single Candlelight, followed by an announcement of the release of their newest album Life On Other Planets. The album was released in January 2020, and was followed by a large North American tour and a smaller European tour. In February 2022 they released a continuous play album 2021: A Hooch Odyssey, which featured remixes of their favorite songs. On September 9, 2021, the band released a new album titled Super Cone Bros referencing the character Mario.

=== April 2024–present ===
On Wednesday, April 10th, 2024 via his Facebook, Jules Jenssen posted from Asbury Park, NJ to announce that he would be playing drums with the band at Wonder Bar that night and "for the foreseeable future." Jules had previously assisted Michael with configuring his live looping setup (including auto-looping) and collaborates in similar capacities, and as a live playback engineer, with artists including Machine Gun Kelly, Lil Wayne, The Kid Laroi, Cordae, Benee and Honeycomb (Beat boxer and musician).

On Monday, April 21st, 2025, Moon Hooch announced through their social media that they would begin an indefinite hiatus starting in 2026. In their announcement they also stated that each of the three members would be taking time to focus on their solo careers. They will continue to play shows through to the end of 2025.

== Philosophy ==
The band believes deeply in environmental causes. They are strongly passionate about environmentalism and sustainable living, and use their influence to share this philosophy with others. In 2017, they announced that the band would be carbon neutral. Along with environmental activism, the band is also united in their practice of meditation. They say that it helps to give them focus, something they value in their work. The band also believes that meditation has allowed them to become better people.

== Discography ==
Studio albums

- Moon Hooch (2013)
- This Is Cave Music (2014)
- Red Sky (2016)
- Life on Other Planets (2020)
- 2021: A Hooch Odyssey (2022)
- Super Cone Bros (2021)
- My Head & My Heart (2023)
- Yesterday's Problem (2024)
- Tomorrow (Moon Hooch & Tonio Sagan, 2025)

EPs

- Joshua Tree (2017)
- Light It Up (2018)
- Light It Up Remix (ft. Roni size and D. Konopka, 2021)
- Super Cone Bros (2021)

Live albums

- Live at the Cathedral (2017)
- Live in Nashville (2020)

Singles

- "Moon Zooz, Pt. 1" (2016)
- "Mon Santo" (2018)
- "Acid Mountain" (2018)
- "Rise" (Moon Hooch & Tonio Sagan, 2019)
- "Give Yourself to Love" (2019)
- "Candlelight" (2019)
- "Nonphysical" (2019)
- "Dirty Dishes" (2020)
- "STONK" (2020)
- "Moon Zooz, Pt. 2" (2021)
- "One Planet" (2022)

== Band members ==
- Michael Wilbur – tenor saxophone, soprano saxophone, bass saxophone, synthesizers, soprano clarinet, vocals
- Wenzl McGowen – tenor saxophone, baritone saxophone, contrabass clarinet, EWI, synthesizers
- Cyzon Griffin - drums and percussion

=== Former band members ===
- Jules Jenssen - drums and percussion
- James Muschler – drums and percussion, tabla, synthesizers, soprano saxophone
- Ethan Snyder - drums and percussion
