= Ease On down the Road =

1975 song

"Ease On down the Road" is a song from the 1975 Broadway musical The Wiz, an R&B re-interpretation of L. Frank Baum's The Wonderful Wizard of Oz. The Charlie Smalls–composed tune is the show's version of both "Follow the Yellow Brick Road" and "We're Off to See the Wizard" from the 1939 version of The Wizard of Oz. In the song, performed three times during the show, Dorothy and her friends the Scarecrow, the Tin Man, and the Cowardly Lion dance their way down the Yellow Brick Road and give each other words of encouragement.

Two versions of the song have been released as charting singles: one associated with the Broadway show by studio group Consumer Rapport in 1975, and a second recorded by Diana Ross and Michael Jackson for the feature-film adaptation of The Wiz (1978).

== Early versions ==
The earliest version of the song was recorded by the Hues Corporation in 1974, for their second studio album Rockin' Soul.

The song was performed by the original Baltimore cast of The Wiz at the Morris A. Mechanic Theatre in October 1974 which included Renee Harris as Dorothy, Charles Valentino as the Scarecrow, Ben Harney as the Tin Man, Ken Prymus as the Cowardly Lion, and Butterfly McQueen as the Queen of the Field Mice.

== 1975 original Broadway cast version ==
"Ease On down the Road"

Song by Dorothy (Stephanie Mills), Scarecrow (Hinton Battle), Tinman (Tiger Haynes), Lion (Ted Ross)

from the album The Wiz (original cast recording)
- Released: 1975
- Recorded: 1975
- Studio: A & R Studios, New York
- Songwriter: Charlie Smalls
- Producer: Jerry Wexler

From January 5, 1975, the song was performed by the new Broadway cast at the Majestic Theatre which included Stephanie Mills (Dorothy), Hinton Battle (Scarecrow), Tiger Haynes (Tin Man) and Ted Ross (Cowardly Lion), who also performed the song on the original 1975 cast album for The Wiz.

== Consumer Rapport version ==
"Ease On down the Road"

Single by Consumer Rapport
- B-side: "Go On with Your Bad Self"
- Released: March 1975
- Recorded: 1975
- Genre: R&B; soul; disco
- Length: 3:02 (7" version); 6:28 (12" version)
- Label: Wing and a Prayer; Atlantic
- Songwriter: Charlie Smalls
- Producers: Stephen Y. Scheaffer; Harold Wheeler

Consumer Rapport singles chronology
"Ease On down the Road" (1975)	"Everybody Join Hands" (1975)

The song was a number-one disco hit for five non-consecutive weeks in a recording by the disco studio group Consumer Rapport. Produced by Stephen Y. Scheaffer and The Wiz musical arranger Harold Wheeler, the Consumer Rapport version hit the Billboard Soul Singles chart, peaking at #19 and the Hot 100, peaking at #42.

== Diana Ross and Michael Jackson version ==
"Ease On down the Road"

Single by Diana Ross & Michael Jackson

from the album The Wiz: Original Motion Picture Soundtrack
- B-side: "Poppy Girls" (instrumental by Quincy Jones)
- Released: September 21, 1978
- Recorded: 1977
- Genre: R&B; soul; disco
- Length: 3:19 (single version); 3:54 (soundtrack version); 6:06 (disco version)
- Label: MCA
- Songwriter: Charlie Smalls
- Producers: Quincy Jones; Tom Bahler

Michael Jackson singles chronology
"One Day in Your Life" (1975)	"Ease On down the Road" (1978)	"You Can't Win" (1979)

Diana Ross singles chronology
"Lovin' Livin' and Givin'" (1978)	"Ease On down the Road" (1978)	"Pops, We Love You" (1978)

In 1977, "Ease on Down the Road" was recorded as a duet between Diana Ross and Michael Jackson and released as the theme song of the 1978 film adaptation of The Wiz. As with the rest of the music in the film, the film version of "Ease on Down the Road" was produced by Quincy Jones. The recording was one of Jackson's first collaborations with Quincy Jones, who became his main producer during the late 1970s and 1980s.

Released as a single by MCA Records in late summer 1978, the song missed the U.S. top 40 by one position, peaking at #41 on the Billboard Hot 100. It reached #17 on the Billboard Hot Soul Singles chart the same year. AllMusic's William Ruhlmann wrote that duet between Jackson and Ross has "spectacular vocal firepower" and that it outperforms the 1975 version by Consumer Rapport. The recording also earned Jackson his first Grammy Award nomination with Ross (his previous two were with his family group, the Jacksons) in the category of Best R&B Performance by a Duo or Group with Vocal in 1979.

In 1980, Jackson was a guest on Kraft Salutes Disneyland's 25th Anniversary and, along with Disney characters (Mickey Mouse, The Seven Dwarves, Donald Duck, Pinocchio, Minnie Mouse, Chip 'n' Dale, Pluto, Winnie the Pooh, The Three Little Pigs, and Goofy), performed the song in a medley with the Disney signature song "When You Wish Upon a Star".

== Charts ==
=== Consumer Rapport version ===
Chart performance for "Ease on Down the Road" by Consumer Rapport
Chart (1975)	Peak position
US Billboard Disco File Top 20	1
US Billboard Hot 100	42
US Billboard Hot Soul Singles	19

=== Diana Ross and Michael Jackson version ===
1978 chart performance for "Ease on Down the Road" by Diana Ross and Michael Jackson
Chart (1978)	Peak position
Canada Top Singles (RPM)	35
Canada Adult Contemporary (RPM)	9
Netherlands (Single Top 100)	33
UK Singles (Official Charts)	45
US Billboard Hot 100	41
US Adult Contemporary (Billboard)	40
US Hot R&B/Hip-Hop Songs (Billboard)	17
US Cash Box Top 100	36

1984 chart performance for "Ease on Down the Road" by Diana Ross and Michael Jackson
Chart (1984)	Peak position
UK Singles (Official Charts)	83

== In popular culture ==
- Della Reese performed the song in the 1975 episode "Della, Della, Della" of the situation comedy Sanford and Son along with Fred G. Sanford.
- In 1977, the song was performed by the cast of The Brady Bunch Variety Hour in a skit based on Pinocchio.
- In 1979, Kathy Romanko and the Crystal Pryzm covered the song on their album Portraits.
- In 1980, The Muppet Show featured the song, played by guest Jean-Pierre Rampal, during episode 510, in a retelling of Pied Piper of Hamelin.
- In 1984, Diff'rent Strokes episode Arnold's Songbird, Arnold promises his class he can get a celebrity for the school talent show, so he asks Carmella the foreign exchange student for help and she sang this song at the talent show.
- In 1997, Family Matters episode What Do You Know?, Carl sang this song to Laura and letting her know The Wiz is coming on TV and wants to watch it with her like when she was a kid.
- Stephen King references the song in the Dark Tower novel The Gunslinger.
- The song appears on Richard Simmons Broadway video Broadway Sweat.
- The song appears in NBC's 2015 production of The Wiz Live!, performed by the TV special's stars Shanice Williams, Elijah Kelley, Ne-Yo and David Alan Grier.
- In 2015, Saturday Night Live cast members Sasheer Zamata, Michael Che, Jay Pharoah and Kenan Thompson sang part of the song, while respectively portraying Dorothy and her friends in a crossover between The Wiz Live! and the movie The Wizard of Oz (1939). At the end of the sketch, they sang it again while teaching the 1939 Scarecrow (played by Ryan Gosling) how to dance the Dab.
