= The Wiz (original cast recording) =

The Wiz The Super Soul Musical "Wonderful Wizard of Oz"

Cast recording by various artists
- Released: 1975
- Genres: R&B, soul, pop
- Length: 45:03
- Label: Atlantic
- Producer: Jerry Wexler

Singles from The Wiz
- 1. "Tornado" Released: 1975

The Wiz, subtitled The Super Soul Musical "Wonderful Wizard Of Oz", is an album containing a recording of the musical The Wiz made by its original 1975 Broadway cast. The album was released by Atlantic Records in the same year.

== Recording ==
The album was produced by Jerry Wexler and recorded at the A & R Studios in New York with Phil Ramone as the chief engineer.

== Critical reception ==
Professional ratings
Review scores
Source	Rating
AllMusic	4.5/5 stars
Billboard	(favorable)

Billboard reviewed the album on April 26, 1975, writing: "The black version of the Wizzard [sic] of Oz turns out to be far more than a soundtrack. The LP becomes a showcase for a number of exceptionally talented young performers, in particular Stephanie Mills, a big voiced Brooklyn teenager. [...] The set was cut as a regular LP (Jerry Wexler producing), not a one shot typical soundtrack – and the care taken shows." The reviewer also added that "the songs st[oo]d out equally well on their own as they d[id] in the context of the story" and that the set "contain[ed] a wealth of singles" and concluded: "Good material from basically unknown people with lots of excitement".

In her retrospective review for AllMusic, Murrday Fisher rated the album 4.5 stars out of five, calling it "a joyous, vibrant celebration of life" and opining that it "far outshine[d] the movie soundtrack". She praised Stephanie Mills as "an absolute delight as Dorothy" and André De Shields as "an engaging, rascally Wiz" and concluded: "Very highly recommended, both for children and adults."

In 2018, the album was inducted into the National Recording Registry.

== Chart performance ==
The album reached number 43 on the Billboard's Top LPs chart.

== Track listing ==
LP – Atlantic SD 18137

Side 1
No.	Title	Performer(s)	Length
1.	"Prologue"	Company	0:20
2.	"The Feeling We Once Had"	Aunt Em (Tasha Thomas)	3:36
3.	"Tornado"	Instrumental	3:25
4.	"He's the Wizard"	Addaperle (Clarice Taylor) & Company	3:19
5.	"Soon As I Get Home"	Dorothy (Stephanie Mills)	3:25
6.	"I Was Born on the Day Before Yesterday"	Scarecrow (Hinton Battle)	3:20
7.	"Ease On down the Road"	Dorothy, Scarecrow, Tinman (Tiger Haynes), Lion (Ted Ross)	2:26
8.	"Slide Some Oil to Me"	Tinman	2:21
9.	"I'm a Mean Ole Lion"	Lion	1:41

Side 2
No.	Title	Performer(s)	Length
1.	"Be a Lion"	Dorothy, Lion	4:03
2.	"So You Wanted to See the Wizard"	The Wiz (Andre De Shields)	1:53
3.	"What Would I Do If I Could Feel"	Tinman	2:53
4.	"Don't Nobody Bring Me No Bad News"	Evillene (Mabel King)	2:30
5.	"Everybody Rejoice"	Dorothy & Company	2:48
6.	"Y'all Got It!"	The Wiz & Company	2:14
7.	"If You Believe"	Glinda (Dee Dee Bridgewater)	2:17
8.	"Home" (Finale)	Dorothy	3:31

- "Music & lyrics by Charlie Smalls except 'Tornado' which is by Timothy Graphenreed & Harold Wheeler and 'Everybody Rejoice' which is by Luther Vandross."

== Charts ==
Chart (1975)	Peak position
US Billboard Top LPs	43

== Awards ==
Year	Award type	Categories	Results	Ref.
1976	Grammy Awards	Best Cast Show Album	Won	
