= The Wiz (soundtrack) =

Soundtrack album by Diana Ross, Michael Jackson & various artists
- Released: September 18, 1978
- Recorded: November 1977 – January 1978
- Studios: A & R, New York City
- Genres: Disco; soul; R&B
- Length: 76:22
- Label: MCA
- Producer: Quincy Jones

Singles from The Wiz: Original Motion Picture Soundtrack
- 1. "Ease On down the Road" Released: September 21, 1978; 2. "You Can't Win" Released: January 11, 1979; 3. "A Brand New Day" Released: 1979

Professional ratings
Review scores
Source	Rating
AllMusic	3/5 stars

The Wiz is the original motion picture soundtrack album for the 1978 film adaptation of the Broadway musical The Wiz. Although the film was produced for Universal Pictures by Motown Records' film division, the soundtrack album was issued on MCA Records as a two-LP collection (Universal was owned by MCA Inc. at the time). Chiefly produced by Quincy Jones, The Wiz soundtrack features non-sync (does not lock to picture) cast performances by the stars of the film, including Diana Ross, Michael Jackson, Nipsey Russell, Ted Ross, Mabel King, Theresa Merritt, Thelma Carpenter, and Lena Horne.

Like many musicals of the period, the performances on the soundtrack album are not those used directly in the film, but pre/re-recorded by the same artists at an earlier and/or later date. Several differences are noted, including a missing line by Michael Jackson and a scat section by Nipsey Russell being dropped from the soundtrack version of "A Brand New Day", among others. The song "Is This What Feeling Gets?" was not used in the film's final cut, though the tune is used throughout the film.

The track selection was made up of both songs from the original 1975 Broadway musical by Charlie Smalls and Luther Vandross, Timothy Graphenreed as well as new songs written for the film by Jones, Nickolas Ashford & Valerie Simpson, and Anthony Jackson. This soundtrack marks Jones' first collaboration with Michael Jackson; Jones went on to produce Jackson's hit solo albums Off the Wall, Thriller, and Bad.

The soundtrack, with its hit single "Ease On down the Road", was more successful than the film itself, which was a commercial and critical failure. It was certified Gold in the United States by the RIAA. It also did well in some European territories like the Netherlands, where "A Brand New Day" was a surprise number-one hit. In 2009, Ross ended each of two sold-out performances at the 34,000-seat Geldredome Stadium (in Arnhem, Netherlands) with a finale of "A Brand New Day". The soundtrack also sold well in Australia.

== Track listing ==
All songs written by Charlie Smalls, unless otherwise noted.

No.	Title	Writer(s)	Artist	Length
1.	"Main Title (Overture, Part One)"		Instrumental	2:36
2.	"Overture (Part Two)"		Instrumental	1:57
3.	"The Feeling That We Had"		Theresa Merritt and Chorus	3:26
4.	"Can I Go On?"	Quincy Jones, Nickolas Ashford and Valerie Simpson	Diana Ross	1:56
5.	"Glinda's Theme"		Instrumental	1:10
6.	"He's the Wizard"		Thelma Carpenter and Chorus	4:09
7.	"Soon As I Get Home / Home"		Diana Ross	4:04
8.	"You Can't Win"		Michael Jackson	3:14
9.	"Ease On down the Road #1"		Diana Ross and Michael Jackson	3:55
10.	"What Would I Do If I Could Feel?"		Nipsey Russell	2:18
11.	"Slide Some Oil to Me"		Nipsey Russell	2:51
12.	"Ease On down the Road #2"		Diana Ross, Michael Jackson and Nipsey Russell	1:31
13.	"I'm a Mean Ole Lion"		Ted Ross	2:24
14.	"Ease On down the Road #3"		Diana Ross, Michael Jackson, Nipsey Russell and Ted Ross	1:26
15.	"Poppy Girls Theme"	Anthony Jackson	Instrumental (Jones)	3:27
16.	"Be a Lion"		Diana Ross, Michael Jackson, Nipsey Russell and Ted Ross	4:04
17.	"End of the Yellow Brick Road"		Instrumental	1:01
18.	"Emerald City Sequence"	(music: Jones, lyrics: Smalls)	Chorus	6:44
19.	"So You Wanted to See the Wizard"		Richard Pryor - (spoken dialogue)	2:46
20.	"Is This What Feeling Gets? (Dorothy's Theme)"	(music: Jones, lyrics: Ashford & Simpson)	Diana Ross - (vocal version not used in film)	3:21
21.	"Don't Nobody Bring Me No Bad News"		Mabel King and Chorus	3:03
22.	"A Brand New Day"	Luther Vandross	Diana Ross, Michael Jackson, Nipsey Russell and Ted Ross	7:49
23.	"Believe in Yourself (Dorothy)"		Diana Ross	2:55
24.	"The Good Witch Glinda"		Instrumental	1:09
25.	"Believe in Yourself (Reprise)"		Lena Horne	2:15
26.	"Home (Finale)"		Diana Ross	4:03
Total length:				1:16:22

== Original vinyl listing ==
All songs written by Charlie Smalls, unless otherwise noted.

=== Record one, side one ===
1. "Main Title (Overture, Part One)" (instrumental)
2. "Overture (Part Two)" (instrumental)
3. "The Feeling That We Have" - Theresa Merritt and The Wiz Choir
4. "Can I Go On?" (Quincy Jones, Nickolas Ashford and Valerie Simpson) - Diana Ross
5. "Glinda's Theme" (instrumental)
6. "He's the Wizard" - Thelma Carpenter and The Wiz Choir
7. "Soon as I Get Home"/"Home" - Diana Ross

=== Record one, side two ===
1. "You Can't Win" - Michael Jackson
2. "Ease On down the Road #1" - Diana Ross and Michael Jackson
3. "What Would I Do If I Could Feel?" - Nipsey Russell
4. "Slide Some Oil to Me" - Nipsey Russell
5. "Ease On down the Road #2" - Diana Ross, Michael Jackson, and Nipsey Russell
6. "I'm a Mean Ole Lion" - Ted Ross
7. "Ease On down the Road #3" - Diana Ross, Michael Jackson, Nipsey Russell, and Ted Ross
8. "Poppy Girls" - (Anthony Jackson) (instrumental)

=== Record two, side one ===
1. "Be a Lion" - Diana Ross, Michael Jackson, Nipsey Russell, and Ted Ross
2. "End of the Yellow Brick Road" (instrumental)
3. "Emerald City Sequence" (music: Jones, lyrics: Smalls) - The Wiz Choir
4. "So You Wanted to See the Wizard" - Richard Pryor (spoken dialogue)
5. "Is This What Feeling Gets? (Dorothy's Theme)" (music: Jones, lyrics: Ashford & Simpson) - Diana Ross

=== Record two, side two ===
1. "Don't Nobody Bring Me No Bad News" - Mabel King and Chorus
2. "A Brand New Day" (Luther Vandross) - Diana Ross, Michael Jackson, Nipsey Russell, Ted Ross, and The Wiz Choir
3. "Believe in Yourself (Dorothy)" - Diana Ross
4. "The Good Witch Glinda" (instrumental)
5. "Believe in Yourself (Reprise)" - Lena Horne
6. "Home" - Diana Ross

== Charts ==
Chart (1978–79)	Peak position
US Billboard Top LPs & Tape	40
US Billboard Top Soul Albums	33

== Certifications ==
Region	Certification	Certified units/sales
United States (RIAA)	Gold	500,000^{^}
^{^} Shipments figures based on certification alone.

== See also ==
- Diana Ross Sings Songs from The Wiz, a 2015 reissue
