= The Wiz Live! =

- Promotional poster
- Based on: The Wiz by William F. Brown; The Wonderful Wizard of Oz by L. Frank Baum
- Written by: Harvey Fierstein
- Directed by: Kenny Leon; Matthew Diamond
- Starring: Common; Amber Riley; Uzo Aduba; Stephanie Mills; Elijah Kelley; Ne-Yo; David Alan Grier; Mary J. Blige; Shanice Williams; Queen Latifah
- Composers: Charlie Smalls; Timothy Graphenreed; Harold Wheeler; Luther Vandross; George Faison; Shaffer Smith; Elijah Kelley; Harvey Mason, Jr.; Stephen Oremus
- Country of origin: United States
- Original language: English

Production
- Executive producers: Craig Zadan; Neil Meron
- Running time: 111 minutes
- Production companies: Universal Television; Sony Pictures Television; Storyline Entertainment

Original release
- Network: NBC
- Release: December 3, 2015

Related
- Peter Pan Live!; Hairspray Live!

The Wiz Live! is an American television special that aired live on NBC on December 3, 2015. Produced by Craig Zadan and Neil Meron, it was a performance of a new adaptation of the 1975 Broadway musical The Wiz, a soul/R&B reinterpretation of L. Frank Baum's 1900 novel The Wonderful Wizard of Oz. The broadcast was performed live from Grumman Studios in Bethpage, New York. This adaptation of the musical combined aspects of both the Broadway play and its 1978 film adaptation.

== Cast and characters ==
=== Main ===
- Shanice Williams as Dorothy Gale
- Elijah Kelley as the Scarecrow / Sticks the Farmhand Man #3
- Ne-Yo as the Tin-Man / John the Farmhand Man #1
- David Alan Grier as the Cowardly Lion / Robert the Farmhand Man #2
- Mary J. Blige as Evillene, the Wicked Witch of the West
- Queen Latifah as the Wiz
- Amber Riley as Addaperle, the Good Witch of the North
- Uzo Aduba as Glinda, the Good Witch of the South
- Stephanie Mills as Auntie Em / Emily Gale
- Common as The Bouncer / The Gatekeeper of the Entrance to the Emerald City
- Scooter the Dog as Toto

=== Ensemble ===
- Chris Borrero
- James Brown III
- Olutayo Bosede
- Elon Van Buckley
- Ta'rea Campbell
- Jessica Castro
- Kacie Garland
- Asmeret Ghebremichael
- Frankie Gordils
- Khadija Griffith
- Tre Holloway
- Carlos Irizarry
- Marcus Paul James
- Frederic Jean
- Capathia Jenkins
- Mykal Kilgore
- Tamika Lawrence
- Noel MacNeal
- India R. McGee
- Paul McGinnis
- Maurice Murphy
- Antonio Moore
- Danielle Polanco
- Malaiyka Reid
- Eric Sanchez
- Sherisse Springer
- Chris Silcox
- Ahmahd Thomas
- Raphael Thomas
- Alex Wade
- Donald Webber
- DaShaun Wesley
- Xavier Wilcher
- NaTasha Williams

Pit voices were provided by Broadway Inspirational Voices.

Source: Broadway World

== Musical numbers ==
The list of musical numbers is taken from the actual broadcast and are in order as they appear in the broadcast and include the characters' names who perform the song.

- "The Feeling We Once Had" – Aunt Em and Ensemble
- "Tornado" – Company
- "He's the Wizard" – Addaperle, Dorothy, and Munchkins
- "Soon as I Get Home" – Dorothy
- "You Can't Win" – Scarecrow and Crows
- "Ease On down the Road" – Dorothy and Scarecrow
- "Slide Some Oil to Me" – Tin Man
- "Ease On down the Road (Reprise)" – Dorothy, Scarecrow, and Tin Man
- "(I'm a) Mean Ole Lion" – Lion
- "Ease On down the Road (Reprise 2)" – Dorothy, Scarecrow, Tin Man, and Lion
- "Kalidah Battle" – Company
- "Be a Lion" – Dorothy and Lion
- "Lion's Dream" – Lion and Poppies
- "Emerald City Ballet (Psst)" – Company
- "So You Wanted to Meet the Wizard" – Wizard
- "What Would I Do If I Could Feel" – Tin Man
- "We Got It" – Dorothy, Scarecrow, Tin Man and Lion
- "Don't Nobody Bring Me No Bad News" – Evilene and Winkies
- "Funky Monkeys" – Company
- "Everybody Rejoice/A Brand New Day" – The Company
- "Y'all Got It!" – Wizard and Company
- "Believe in Yourself" – Glinda
- "Home/Finale" – Dorothy

All numbers composed by Charlie Smalls save for the following: "Tornado" is composed by Timothy Graphenreed and Harold Wheeler. "Emerald City Ballet (Psst)" is composed by Graphenreed and George Faison. "We Got It" is written by Ne-Yo, Elijah Kelley, Harvey Mason Jr, and Stephen Oremus. "Everybody Rejoice/A Brand New Day" is written by Luther Vandross.

== Production ==
=== Development ===
The production, a co-production between Universal Television and Cirque du Soleil Theatrical – who provided special acrobatic performers for the "Tornado", "You Can't Win", and "Funky Monkeys" sequences – was a follow-up to NBC's live musical events, The Sound of Music Live! and Peter Pan Live!. Like the previous specials, The Wiz Live! was televised from Grumman Studios in Bethpage, New York. The role of Dorothy was cast via an open audition on June 6, 2015. On August 5, it was announced on Today that Shanice Williams of New Jersey would fill the role in The Wiz Live!. Williams had co-starred in local productions of You're a Good Man, Charlie Brown and West Side Story among others, and in 2014, was nominated for a Paper Mill Playhouse Rising Star Award for best leading actress.

The special was directed by Kenny Leon and adapted for television by Harvey Fierstein from the original musical's book by William F. Brown. Fatima Robinson was the program's choreographer, with Harvey Mason, Jr. and Stephen Oremus serving as the musical directors. Songs from the original Broadway production were featured, with two exceptions: "You Can't Win", a song cut from the musical and first used in the 1978 feature film adaptation as sung by Michael Jackson (used in place of Scarecrow's "I Was Born on the Day Before Yesterday" number), and the new song "We Got It", composed by Harvey Mason Jr., Stephen Oremus with stars Ne-Yo and Elijah Kelley, performed as Dorothy, Scarecrow, Tin Man, and Cowardly Lion begin their quest to defeat the Wicked Witch of the West.

The Wiz Live! was the first live TV program in US history to contain audio description for blind or visually impaired viewers.

=== Marketing ===
The cost of a 30-second commercial during The Wiz ranged between $330,000 to $350,000, marking a drop from the $345,000 to $400,000 cost of ad time during Peter Pan Live!. The decrease in ad cost was attributed to the modest viewership of Peter Pan in comparison to The Sound of Music Live!, which an analyst felt was a result of the reduced novelty of the production in comparison to The Sound of Music. Reddi-wip served as a main sponsor of the presentation; Walmart, which served as a major sponsor of NBC's previous live musicals, declined to participate. NBC produced themed commercials to air throughout the special as part of the brand's "Share the Joy" campaign; one, which was timed to air after the corresponding scene in the musical, featured "A Brand New Day" being performed by students of the Excel Academy in Hyattsville, Maryland—a school which ConAgra Foods had donated money to in support of musical arts.

== Reception ==
=== Critical reception ===
The Wiz Live! received positive reviews from critics, who praised the acting and singing abilities of the cast and for being an improvement over the two previous live NBC musicals. On Rotten Tomatoes, the show has a 91% rating, based on 33 reviews, with an average rating of 8.8/10. The site's consensus states: "The Wiz Live! is several notches above NBC's other musical broadcasts thanks to bold performances and large-scale production pieces." Metacritic reports a weighted average of 73 out of 100, based on 16 critics, indicating "generally favorable reviews".

=== Viewership ===
The Wiz Live! was seen by 11.5 million viewers, with a 3.4 rating in the 18-49 demographic. Although higher than Peter Pan Live!, it trailed a Thursday Night Football game on CBS between the Detroit Lions and Green Bay Packers, which was seen by around 17 million. Average household viewership was notably higher in markets with a large African-American population, such as Atlanta, Baltimore, Norfolk, Richmond, and Washington, D.C. Nielsen also reported that the special produced the most social network interactions of any live television event in the past four years; there were three times as many Twitter postings related to The Wiz Live! than there were related to Peter Pan Live!. NBC rebroadcast the special on December 19, 2015. The rebroadcast was seen by 1.6 million viewers.

=== Accolades ===
Award	Category	Nominee(s)	Result	Ref.
Art Directors Guild Awards	Awards or Event Special	Derek McLane	Nominated	
Black Reel Awards	Outstanding Television Documentary or Special	Kenny Leon	Won	
Black Reel Awards	Outstanding Actress, TV Movie or Limited Series	Shanice Williams	Nominated	
Black Reel Awards	Outstanding Supporting Actor, TV Movie or Limited Series	David Alan Grier	Nominated	
Black Reel Awards	Outstanding Supporting Actress, TV Movie or Limited Series	Mary J. Blige	Nominated	
Black Reel Awards	Outstanding Supporting Actress, TV Movie or Limited Series	Amber Riley	Nominated	
Costume Designers Guild Awards	Outstanding Fantasy Television Series	Paul Tazewell	Nominated	
Critics' Choice Television Awards	Best Movie Made for Television or Limited Series		Nominated	
Critics' Choice Television Awards	Best Actress in a Movie Made for Television or Limited Series	Shanice Williams	Nominated	
Critics' Choice Television Awards	Best Supporting Actor in a Movie Made for Television or Limited Series	David Alan Grier	Nominated	
Critics' Choice Television Awards	Best Supporting Actor in a Movie Made for Television or Limited Series	Ne-Yo	Nominated	
Critics' Choice Television Awards	Best Supporting Actress in a Movie Made for Television or Limited Series	Mary J. Blige	Nominated	
Directors Guild of America Awards	Outstanding Directorial Achievement in Movies for Television and Mini-Series	Kenny Leon and Alec Rudzinski	Nominated	
NAACP Image Awards	Outstanding Television Movie, Mini-Series or Dramatic Special		Won	
NAACP Image Awards	Outstanding Actor in a Television Movie, Mini-Series or Dramatic Special	David Alan Grier	Won	
Online Film & Television Association Awards	Best Makeup/Hairstyling in a Non-Series		Nominated	
Primetime Emmy Awards	Outstanding Costumes for a Variety, Nonfiction or Reality Program	Paul Tazewell, Rachel Attridge and Rory Powers	Won	
Primetime Emmy Awards	Outstanding Hairstyling for a Multi-Camera Series or Special	Charles G. LaPointe, Kevin Maybee, Elizabeth Printz and Amanda Duffy	Nominated	
Primetime Emmy Awards	Outstanding Lighting Design/Lighting Direction for a Variety Special	Allen Branton, Darren Langer, Kevin Lawson, Felix Peralta, Eric Marchwinski and Kirk Miller	Nominated	
Primetime Emmy Awards	Outstanding Makeup for a Multi-Camera Series or Special (Non-Prosthetic)	Cookie Jordan, Matiki Anoff, Debi Young, Stephanie McGee, Bjorn Rehbein and Christine Domaniecki	Nominated	
Primetime Emmy Awards	Outstanding Production Design for a Variety, Nonfiction, Event or Award Special	Derek McLane, Erica Hemminger and Mike Pilipski	Nominated	
Primetime Emmy Awards	Outstanding Technical Direction, Camerawork, Video Control for a Limited Series, Movie or a Special	Bob Muller, Emmett Loughran, Miguel Armstrong, Rob Balton, Manny Gutierrez, Shaun Harkins, Jeff Latonero, Jay Millard, Jimmy O'Donnell, David A. Smith, Claus Stuhlweissenburg, Ron Washburn, Mark Whitman, William Steinberg and JC Castro	Nominated	
Saturn Awards	Best Television Presentation		Nominated	

== Home media ==
NBC released a DVD of the special on December 22, 2015, through Universal Studios Home Entertainment. The DVD includes a behind-the-scenes special, The Making of The Wiz Live! As part of Andrew Lloyd Webber's The Shows Must Go On, the full show was made available on YouTube for a limited time, to support the African-American community and other communities of color during the George Floyd protests.

== See also ==
- 2015 in American television
