= A Brand New Day (The Wiz song) =

Song from the 1974 Broadway musical The Wiz

"Everybody Rejoice"

Song by Dorothy (Stephanie Mills) & Company

from the album The Wiz (original cast recording)
- Released: 1975
- Recorded: 1975
- Studio: A & R Studios, New York
- Songwriter: Luther Vandross
- Producer: Jerry Wexler

"A Brand New Day"

Single by The Wiz Stars featuring Diana Ross and Michael Jackson

from the album The Wiz: Original Motion Picture Soundtrack
- B-side: "Liberation Ballet – A Brand New Day"
- Released: 1979
- Recorded: 1977
- Genre: R&B; soul
- Length: 2:40
- Label: MCA
- Songwriter: Luther Vandross
- Producers: Quincy Jones; Tom Bahler

Michael Jackson singles chronology
"You Can't Win" (1979)	"A Brand New Day" (1979)	"Don't Stop 'Til You Get Enough" (1979)

Diana Ross singles chronology
"Pops, We Love You" (1978)	"A Brand New Day" (1979)	"The Boss" (1979)

"A Brand New Day", also known as "Everybody Rejoice", is a song from the 1974 Broadway musical The Wiz written by American R&B singer and songwriter Luther Vandross.

== Background ==
In the musical, the song is sung to celebrate after Dorothy has killed Evillene, the tyrannical Wicked Witch of the West. Dorothy, the Tin Man, the Cowardly Lion, and the Scarecrow sing the song with the newly freed Winkies, who were ruled and enslaved by Evillene.

== 1975 and 1976 recordings ==
In 1975, Stephanie Mills (as Dorothy) performed the song on the original cast album for The Wiz.

In 1976, Vandross recorded a version of the song for his album Luther, on Cotillion Records.

== 1978 film version ==
It was later featured in the 1978 film version, sung by cast members Diana Ross, Michael Jackson, Nipsey Russell, and Ted Ross (credited as The Wiz Stars). Given the all-Black cast of The Wiz, the song's many references to freedom and new possibilities (especially as sung by African American characters who had just been freed from enslavement) certainly invoked the struggles and history of Blacks in America. In the onscreen version of the song, Nipsey Russell can even be heard exclaiming "Free at last!"—a reference to civil rights activist Martin Luther King Jr. (His impromptu addition to the song is not heard on the soundtrack album version, instead replaced by sung vocals by Ross.) The song's opening line is sung by Vandross, the song's composer (Vandross' line was to represent one of the Winkies singing and dancing on a table while throwing an item into the air).

The film version was released as a single in some continental European countries and peaked at number one in Belgium and the Netherlands, credited to The Wiz Stars featuring Diana Ross and Michael Jackson.

=== Release details and content ===
The single release is an edit of the first half of the song, which in its entirety runs 7:49 on the film's soundtrack. It is backed by the second half of the song, which is labeled as "Liberation Ballet – A Brand New Day". The "Liberation Ballet" is primarily instrumental and is composed of uptempo dance music in a variety of styles, with the film's cast and choir cheering and singing "Can you feel the brand new day" throughout the piece.

=== Personnel ===
- Luther Vandross, Diana Ross, Michael Jackson, Nipsey Russell, Ted Ross – vocals

== Charts ==
=== Weekly charts ===
Weekly chart performance for "A Brand New Day" by The Wiz Stars
Chart (1979)	Peak position
Belgium (Ultratop 50 Flanders)	1
Netherlands (Dutch Top 40)	1
Netherlands (Single Top 100)	1

=== Year-end charts ===
Year-end chart performance for "A Brand New Day" by The Wiz Stars
Chart (1979)	Position
Belgium (Ultratop Flanders)	14
Netherlands (Dutch Top 40)	10
Netherlands (Single Top 100)	17
