= Ella Mitchell =

American soul singer and actress (1935–2024)

- Born: September 14, 1935; Ahoskie, North Carolina, U.S.
- Died: July 2, 2024 (aged 88); New York City, U.S.
- Occupations: Soul singer, actress
- Years active: 1951–2024
- Notable work: Hattie Mae Pierce (Big Momma) in Big Momma's House

Ella Mitchell (September 14, 1935 – July 2, 2024) was an American soul singer and actress. She is most recognized for playing the comic role as Hattie Mae Pierce (Big Momma) in the 2000 comedy film Big Momma's House and the evil witch Evillene in the Broadway theatre revival production of the musical The Wiz.

== Life and career ==
Mitchell was born in Ahoskie, North Carolina, on September 14, 1935.

Mitchell appeared in the 1975 film Lord Shango. She assumed the role of Evillene when The Wiz revived on Broadway in 1984. She reprised the role again when the show was on tour in 1992.

Mitchell was a member of The Gospel All Stars and The Bradford Singers, and performed with the Alvin Ailey American Dance Theater for 30 years.

In September 2000, Mitchell was one of a "multicultural" array of artists—including Jojo Mayer, Hyung-ki Joo, Luoyong Wang, Gilles Chiasson, and Angela Covington—performing at Madison Square Garden's Paramount Theatre as part of the "Peace, Health and Prosperity Concert" that concluded the United Nations Millennium Summit.

Mitchell died in New York City on July 2, 2024, at the age of 88.

== Filmography ==
Year	Title	Role	Notes
1973	Sesame Street	Herself	2 episodes
1975	Lord Shango	Lead singer	Uncredited
2000	Big Momma's House	Hattie Mae Pierce (Big Momma)	Final film role
