= Cowardly Lion =

Fictional character from The Wonderful Wizard of Oz

- Oz character
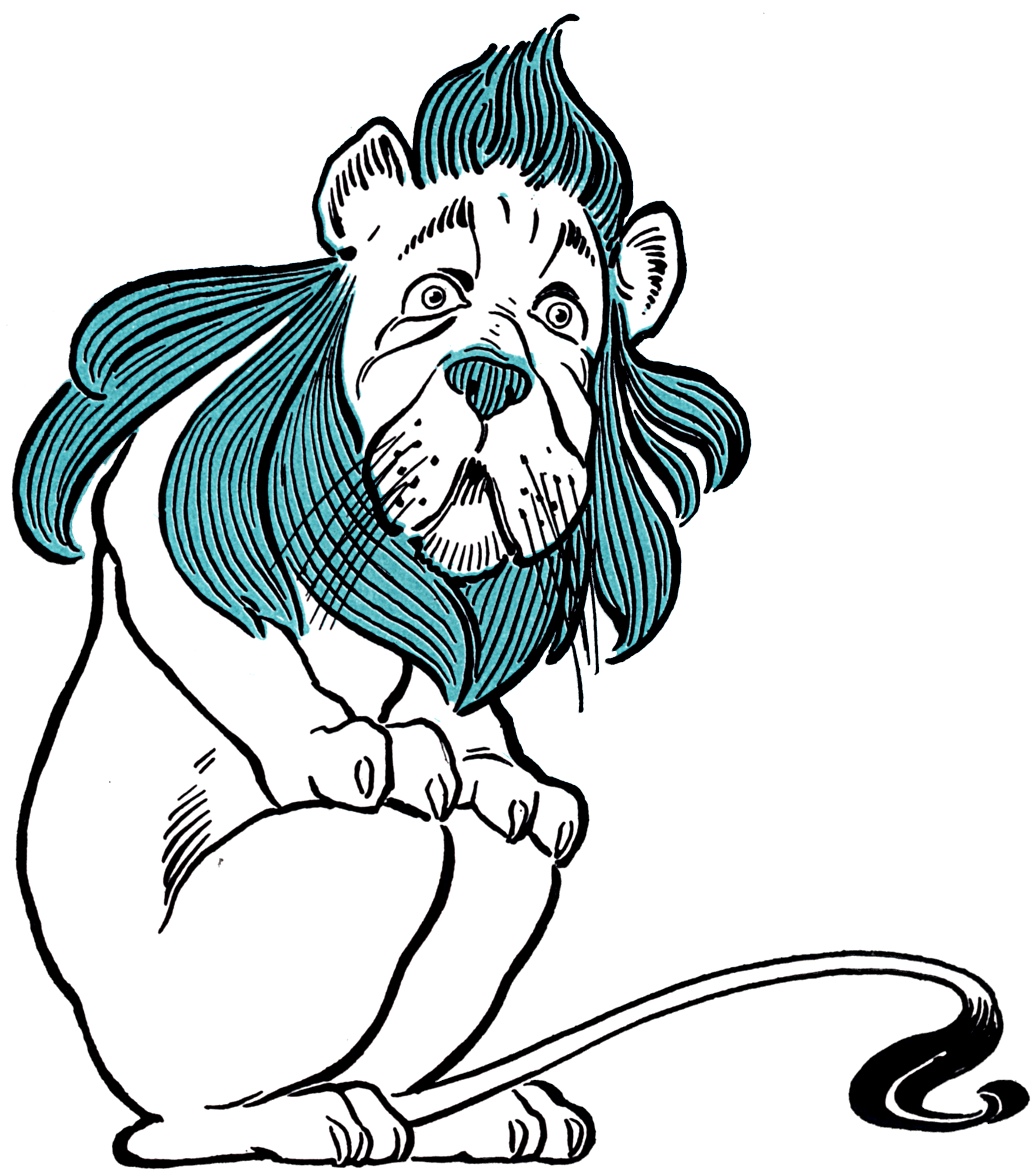
- Cowardly Lion as illustrated by William Wallace Denslow (1900)
- First appearance: The Wonderful Wizard of Oz (1900)
- Created by: L. Frank Baum
- Portrayed by: Fred Woodward (His Majesty, the Scarecrow of Oz); Curtis McHenry (The Wizard of Oz); Bert Lahr (The Wizard of Oz); Ted Ross (The Wiz); Cedric the Entertainer (1995 Apollo Theater Revival); John Alexander (Return to Oz); David Alan Grier (The Wiz Live!)
- Voiced by: Jim Belushi (Legends of Oz: Dorothy's Return); Jess Harnell (Dorothy and the Wizard of Oz); Colman Domingo (Wicked: For Good)

In-universe information
- Alias: Dandy Lion
- Species: Lion
- Gender: Male
- Title: King of the Forest
- Occupation: King of the Forest of Wild Beasts; Ozma's charioteer

The Cowardly Lion is a character in the fictional Land of Oz created by American author L. Frank Baum. He is depicted as an African lion, and like all animals in Oz, he can speak.

Although he often doubts himself, the Cowardly Lion nonetheless often demonstrates bravery in the face of danger. Since lions are supposed to be "The King of Beasts", the Cowardly Lion worries his own fear makes him inadequate, failing to understand that courage is not a lack of fear, but acting in the face of fear. His fear is alleviated only in the aftermath of the Wizard's gift, when he is under the influence of a liquid substance the Wizard orders him to drink. He argues that the courage from the Wizard is only temporary, though he continues to do brave deeds.

== Books ==
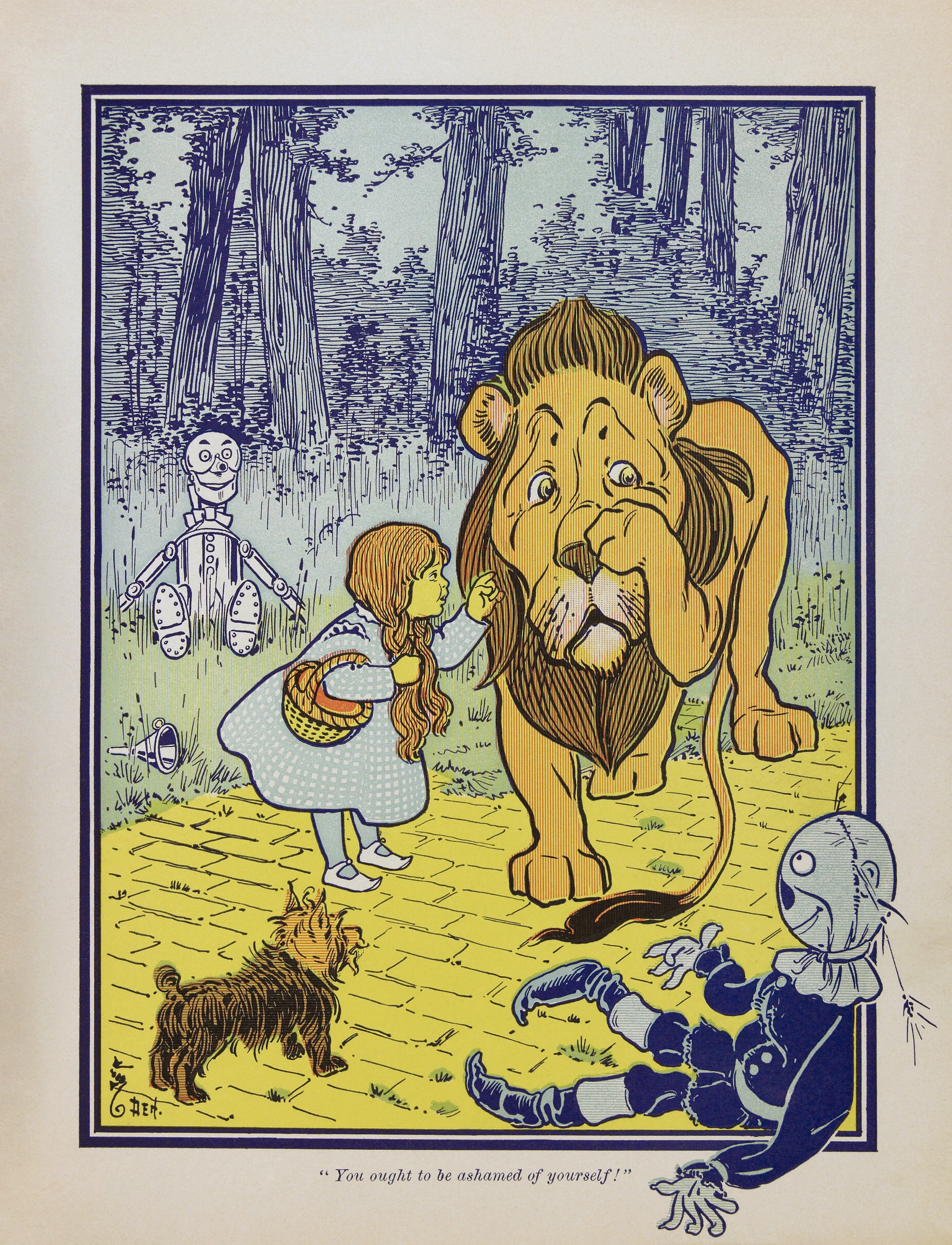
Dorothy meets the Cowardly Lion, from the first edition.

The Cowardly Lion makes his first appearance in the book The Wonderful Wizard of Oz. He is the last of the companions Dorothy befriends on her way to the Emerald City where he ambushes her, Toto, Scarecrow, and Tin Woodman. When he tries to bite Toto, Dorothy slaps him. She calls the Lion a coward and the Lion admits that he is. The Cowardly Lion joins her so that he can ask the Wizard for courage, ashamed that he is not brave enough to play his cultural role of the King of the Beasts. Despite outward evidence that he is unreasonably fearful, the Cowardly Lion displays great bravery along the way. During the journey, he leaps across a chasm on the road of yellow brick multiple times, each time with a companion on his back and then leaps back to get the next one. When they come into another, wider chasm, the Cowardly Lion holds off two Kalidahs while the Tin Woodman cuts a tall tree to cross it. In spite of his fears, he still goes off to hunt for his food and he even offers to kill a deer for Dorothy to eat, but the idea makes her uncomfortable.

The Wizard gives the Lion a dish of unknown liquid, telling him it is "courage" to drink. In the remainder of the book, he becomes aggressive and ready to fight. He accompanies Dorothy on her journey to see Glinda, and allows his friends to stand on his back in order to escape the Dainty China Country.

The Lion's favored companion is the Hungry Tiger. This may well be the "Biggest of the Tigers" he and his friends encounter in the Forest of Wild Beasts in the Quadling Country In this forest, all of the lions and many of the other animals have been eaten by a Giant Spider. The Lion finds the Giant Spider asleep and decapitates it. The Tiger and the other animals bow to him and ask him to be their king, and he promises to do so upon his return from accompanying Dorothy to Glinda. Glinda orders the Winged Monkeys to carry him back to the Forest once Dorothy has returned home.

In the rest of Baum's Oz series, the Lion never again played a major role. In later books, the Lion often accompanies Dorothy on her adventures. He is Princess Ozma's chief guardian on state occasions and he and the Hungry Tiger pull Ozma's chariot. In subsequent Oz books by Baum, the Lion was shown to have continued being courageous and loyal, although still considering himself a coward and regularly frightened, even by Aunt Em. He befriended the Hungry Tiger in Ozma of Oz, if this was not the earlier Tiger, which The Patchwork Girl of Oz implies that it is by calling both Lion and Tiger "largest of their kind", and the two have become Ozma's personal guards. In Glinda of Oz he is on Ozma's board of advisers.

In "The Cowardly Lion and the Hungry Tiger" in Little Wizard Stories of Oz, the Lion begins with cowardly bravado, intending to find a man to tear apart and the Tiger a fat baby to devour. Instead, they find a small child, bigger than a baby and return it to its mother.

In a later book in the Oz series, The Cowardly Lion of Oz by Ruth Plumly Thompson, Mustafa of Mudge, a wealthy sultan at the southern tip of the Munchkin Country, kidnaps the Lion for his large collection of lions that he feels would be incomplete without Oz's most famous lion. He was turned to stone by the giant Crunch, but rescued by American circus clown Notta Bit More and orphan Bobbie Downs, whom the clown prefers to call by the more optimistic-sounding Bob Up.

For the most part in later Oz books, though, the Lion is a cameo appearance, instead of a major character. His other significant appearances include Ojo in Oz, where he is turned into a clock by Mooj and saved by Ozma and the Wizard. He assisted against the Stratovanians in Ozoplaning with the Wizard of Oz, Terp the Terrible in The Hidden Valley of Oz, and accompanied Dorothy and Prince Gules of Halidom in Merry Go Round in Oz. John R. Neill portrayed him primarily as a beast of burden in his three Oz books. In all, the only three books in which the Lion does not rate at least a mention are The Tin Woodman of Oz, Grampa in Oz and The Silver Princess in Oz.

=== Alternate stories ===
- The Lion appears in Gregory Maguire's revisionist series The Wicked Years, starting with Wicked: The Life and Times of the Wicked Witch of the West (1995). He is one of many human-like Animals possessing the ability to talk, and was taken from his mother as a cub for use in an experiment on the nature of Animals. Elphaba, the future Wicked Witch of the West, saves the Lion Cub; they encounter each other near the novel's end, as the Lion joins Dorothy in the hunt for the Witch. After a minor role in the second novel Son of a Witch (2005), The Lion becomes the central character in the third novel, A Lion Among Men (2008), where he is given the name Brrr. He appears in the final novel, Out of Oz (2011), where he ascends to Throne Minister of Oz.
- In Danielle Paige's Dorothy Must Die (2014), the Lion has become a giant, brutal warrior who walks on his hind legs, draining the fear from others to increase his own strength. In the sequel The Wicked Will Rise (2015), protagonist Amy Gumm is able to take the Lion's courage by cutting off his tail, realizing it has been sewn onto his hindquarters, but Amy spares the Lion despite being tempted to kill him. The Lion is subsequently bound and forced to fight for Dorothy despite his fear, forcing Amy to kill him despite her past actions.

== Film portrayals ==
=== His Majesty, the Scarecrow of Oz ===
In the 1914 film His Majesty, the Scarecrow of Oz, the Lion was played by Fred Woodward.

=== The Wizard of Oz (1925) ===
In the 1925 silent film The Wizard of Oz, directed by and starring Larry Semon, the Lion was played in disguise by Curtis McHenry.

=== The Wizard of Oz (1939) ===
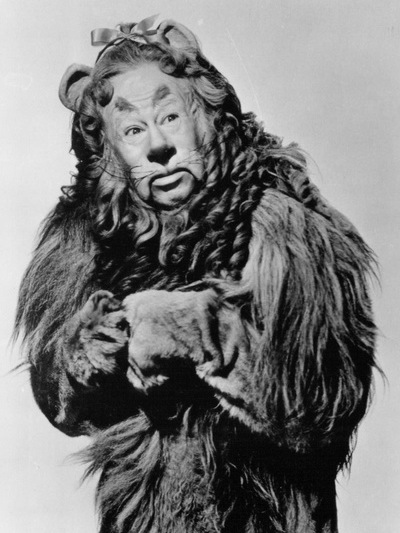
Bert Lahr as the Cowardly Lion for the 1939 film.

In the classic 1939 film The Wizard of Oz, the Lion was a humanoid biped and played by Bert Lahr, a popular vaudeville and Broadway star, with many of Lahr's trademark mannerisms deliberately worked into the film. In this version, the liquid courage given to him by the Wizard is replaced with a medal marked "Courage". Bert Lahr's biography, written by his son John Lahr, is entitled Notes on a Cowardly Lion.

In the film, the Lion walks on his hind legs instead of all four, except when he is first seen bounding out of the forest to attack Dorothy's friends. After roaring fiercely at them on all fours, he does stand up on his hind legs.

Lahr also portrayed the Lion's Kansas counterpart, Zeke, one of Aunt Em and Uncle Henry's farmworkers. Screenwriter Noel Langley created this character for the film. Zeke helps Hickory, Tin Man's alter ego, lower a bed into its place on a wagon at the farm. He then moves the hogs into the pig pen and pours feed into their trough. When Dorothy falls off the railing that encircles the pen, Zeke jumps in and rescues her. With Dorothy safe, Zeke sits down beside the pen, breathing heavily and seemingly about to faint. The others realize that he had been afraid of the pigs, and playfully mock him. Zeke wears his hat throughout the entire film because he does not struggle to open the cellar when the tornado approaches the farm. Hunk, Scarecrow's alter-ego, closes and locks the cellar with him when Dorothy arrives at the farmhouse. Zeke and Professor Marvel, the Wizard's alter-ego, are the only men wearing hats when Dorothy awakens from being unconscious.

==== Cowardly Lion Courage Medal ====
Cowardly Lion's courage medal used for the 1939 film.

The original Courage Medal prop from the 1939 film, a cross-shaped medal made of poly-chromed metal and measuring 7.5 × 7.5" (19.1 × 19.1 cm), features a lion in profile above a crown and a knight's helmet and the word "Courage" in raised blue scroll lettering. In the late 1950s, Mal Caplan, the head of the costume department at MGM was in a life-threatening automobile accident, and spent months in the hospital before returning to work. For sometime he was unable to sit upright and had to work from a chaise longue. In recognition of his courage, his colleagues and the management at MGM presented him with the Lion's Courage Medal. He was also given the Tin Man's "heart", but he gave that to "someone who needed it", a man in the same hospital who was having open heart surgery. The current whereabouts of the heart clock are unknown. The Courage Medal remained in the Caplan family until it was consigned to a Sotheby's Entertainment Memorabilia auction in May 1997. The medal was purchased by a New Jersey collector, and in November 2010 was featured on episode 7 of the TV show Hollywood Treasure.

==== Cowardly Lion costumes ====
An original Cowardly Lion costume from The Wizard of Oz was packed away after filming and forgotten for decades. It was found barely in time to be included in the landmark 1970 Metro-Goldwyn-Mayer auction, where it sold for $2,400 to a California chiropractor. In 1985, sculptor Bill Mack acquired it; he could not recall the exact price, but stated, "It was several thousand dollars, instead of several hundred thousand". He had it restored by a taxidermist and "recreated the headpiece with a lifelike sculpture of Lahr". In December 2006, he sold it for $826,000.

Another costume currently resides in the Comisar Collection, the largest collection of television artifacts in the world. Curator James Comisar acquired the costume, after verifying to his satisfaction that it had been worn in the film, and set about restoring it. The major challenge was the weight of the tail caused rips across the back of the costume that needed to be patched, which was done by Cara Varnell, a textile conservation expert at the Los Angeles County Museum of Art. The Cowardly Lion's original facial appliances had been glued directly to Bert Lahr's face and did not survive the production, so Comisar asked Lahr's son, Herbert, to model for another face cast, as he had an uncanny resemblance to his father. Herbert Lahr remarked:

The Lion's suit was very interesting. It was a real lion skin, and it weighed 60 lbs. My dad had to be in it all day, he couldn't eat because of the way the mask was, so he had to eat his lunch through a straw.

The Cowardly Lion's mane was re-created from human hair imported from Italy at a cost of $22,000, and more than twenty-one artisans worked for two years completing the conservation.

Comisar's Cowardly Lion costume has been featured in the national media, including on The Oprah Winfrey Show, when it was then valued at $1.5 million. The costume is thought to be among the most valuable and iconic Hollywood objects in existence. “Most of us cannot relate to not having a brain or a heart; we can all relate to not having enough courage, and it is for this reason I believe the Cowardly Lion is the character we respond to the most,” said Comisar. Many potential buyers have expressed interest in buying the costume, but so far he has rejected all offers. Comisar's costume was offered by Bonhams in their TCM-themed auction that took place in New York City on November 24, 2014, where it received great interest and realized the selling price of $3.1 million, and this is the highest known price point for a costume worn by a male performer in any Hollywood production.

William Stillman, a noted historian and co-author of several books about the film, featured a full-page photograph of this Cowardly Lion costume in his book, The Wizardry of Oz: The Artistry and the Magic of the M.G.M. 1939 Classic. The accompanying text states, "While Bert Lahr appears to wear the same costume throughout the picture, others were available for dress rehearsals or for the stunt double to bound onto the Yellow Brick Road, leap through a window in the Emerald City, or scale the cliffs outside the Witch's castle." In 1998, both Comisar and auctioneering company Profiles in History, on behalf of Mack, insisted they had Lahr's costume.

=== The Wiz ===
The Lion is a featured character role in The Wiz, an all-Black Broadway musical adaptation of The Wonderful Wizard of Oz with songs by Charlie Smalls, a book by William F. Brown, and direction by Geoffrey Holder. Ted Ross first portrayed the Lion named Fleetwood Coupe de Ville when The Wiz debuted on Broadway in 1975, and he won the 1975 Tony Award for Best Featured Actor in a Musical for his portrayal.

Ross reprised his role as the Lion in Motown Productions and Universal Pictures' 1978 film version of The Wiz, directed by Sidney Lumet. David Alan Grier portrayed the Lion in 2015's The Wiz Live!, an NBC television special adapted from the musical by director Kenny Leon and teleplay writer Harvey Fierstein.

=== Return to Oz ===
In the 1985 spiritual sequel to The Wizard of Oz, the Lion is briefly seen at the end of the film. Unlike the 1939 film, this version is a puppet and walks on all fours. He is also shown growling rather than speaking.

=== The Oz Kids ===
In the 1996 animated cartoon series The Oz Kids, the Lion (voiced by unknown) rules the kingdom to the south of Emerald City, Quadling Country and has two cubs, Bela and Boris. His son Boris is afraid of things, like his father.

=== Legends of Oz: Dorothy's Return ===
The Lion appeared in the animated film Legends of Oz: Dorothy's Return, which is based on Dorothy of Oz, voiced by Jim Belushi.

=== Oz: The Great and Powerful ===
The Lion makes a brief cameo in the 2013 film Oz: The Great and Powerful, as a CGI character. He briefly tries to attack Oz (played by James Franco) and his monkey companion Finley (voiced by Zach Braff), but Oz uses his magic to create a velvet fog that intimidates the Lion, causing him to immediately retreat.

=== Wicked and Wicked: For Good ===
In Wicked (2024), adapted from the first half of the stage musical and its originating novel, the Lion appears as a cub used in a demonstration on how to subdue talking Animals by keeping them in cages. Elphaba, the eventual Wicked Witch of the West, stages a rescue, and the experience radicalizes her in favor of the Animals and their rights.

The Cowardly Lion returns in Wicked: For Good (2025), motion-captured by Omari Bernard and voiced by Colman Domingo. Now an adult, he appears when Elphaba attempts to convince the other Animals to confront the Wizard rather than flee. He harbors resentment for Elphaba abducting him from the only home he knew, despite Elphaba protesting he would have gone mute otherwise, and dissuades the Animals by revealing her to have given the flying monkeys their wings. Later on, after joining Dorothy's group in the hunt for Elphaba, the Tin Man blames the Witch for the Lion's cowardice, claiming he wouldn't be that way if she let him fight his own battles.

== Later works and parodies ==
- In the 1961 animated TV series, Tales of the Wizard of Oz and its sequel, the 1964 NBC animated television special Return to Oz, the Lion, here named Dandy Lion was voiced by Paul Kligman.
- In a 1979 episode of The World's Greatest Super Friends, Wonder Woman temporarily became the Lion after a tornado took her, Superman, and Aquaman to Oz. While passing Mister Mxyzptlk’s dangerous landscape, she had lower legs of an African lion. She did not get returned to normal until she reached the Wizard (Mister Mxyzptlk himself) with Superman and Aquaman.
- In a 1981 episode of Scooby-Doo and Scrappy-Doo, Scooby is dressed as the Lion after a tornado took him, Shaggy, and Scrappy to "Ahz", a direct spoof of Oz with a different spelling by its enunciation.
- The Lion appears in the 1990 The Wizard of Oz cartoon, voiced by Charlie Adler. The Lion has his brave and cowardly persona intact, and even gets to wear the Ruby Slippers for a short while in one episode.
- Nathan Lane performs as this character in the 1995 television stage performance The Wizard of Oz in Concert: Dreams Come True. The Kansas farmworker Zeke does not appear in this production. He sings the longer version of "If I Only Had the Nerve" including the bridge verses sung by the Scarecrow (Jackson Browne), Tin Man (Roger Daltrey), and Dorothy (Jewel). In his version of If I Were King of the Forest, he has an addition into the lyrics "Not queen, not duke, not prince...or the Artist Formerly known as Prince".
- The Lion appears as an enemy in the 1997 video game, Castlevania: Symphony of the Night, along with the Scarecrow and the Tin Man.
- "Home", a 2002 song from American rock band Breaking Benjamin, references a "cowardly lion" in its lyrics.
- Strawberry Shortcake's 2003 cartoon has Berry Brick Road, where Strawberry Shortcake, taking Dorothy Gale's role, goes to Oz to get home. The Lion returns as her third companion, fourth counting Pupcake, his design now changed to resemble Orange Blossom with braided hair and in a lion costume.
- In the 2005 ABC television film The Muppets' Wizard of Oz, Fozzie Bear plays the role of the Lion. Fozzie's other role is himself. He shows up at the end of this film in the Muppets' show.
- In the 2007 VeggieTales episode The Wonderful Wizard of Ha's, he is renamed the "Hungry Lion" who was played by Pa Grape. His Kansas counterpart from the 1939 film also appeared in this Christian cartoon.
- In the 2007 Sci Fi television miniseries Tin Man, the Lion is re-imagined as a character named Raw, a member of the race of Viewers - half-man, half-lion beings with telekinetic and empathic abilities. He is played by Raoul Trujillo
- The Lion appears in the 2011 direct-to-DVD animated film Tom and Jerry and the Wizard of Oz, voiced by Todd Stashwick.
- The Lion appears in 2012 film Dorothy and the Witches of Oz, played by Barry Ratcliffe. He appears on Earth in the form of Dorothy Gale's lawyer Bryan Jennings.
- In 2015, the Lion appears in Lego Dimensions, voiced by Jess Harnell.
- The Lion appears in the Once Upon a Time 2017 episode "Where Bluebirds Fly". Though he does not speak, the Lion still has his traits. The Lion was a line of defense for the Crimson Heart that is sought out by Stanum and Zelena. After the Lion attacks Stanum, he is driven away by Zelena.
- In the TV 2017 series Emerald City, the Lion analogue is Eamonn and is portrayed by Mido Hamada. He is presented as unquestioningly loyal member of the Wizard's guard who is personally tasked with finding Dorothy before she reaches Emerald City and doing whatever it takes to prevent the return of the Beast forever. As the series unfolds, he is revealed to have assisted the Wizard of Oz in killing the Royal Family of Oz when the Wizard first came to power, but initially spared the princess Ozma as she reminded him of his own daughter. When Ozma learns of her past and assumes her role as leader of Oz, she punishes Eamonn by condemning him to be trapped in the form of a beast, turning him into a Lion due to the lion mask he wore when killing her family.
- In 2017, The Lion first appears in Lost In Oz, voiced by Keith Ferguson.
- In 2017, The Lion appears in Dorothy and the Wizard of Oz, voiced again by Jess Harnell.
- In 2019, The Lion appears in The Lego Movie 2: The Second Part. Alongside Dorothy and her friends, the Lion is somehow transported from the Land of Oz to Harmony Town in the Systar System.
- In 2025, The Lion takes the place of MGM's Leo the Lion in a parody of the studio's trademark logo at the start of The Wizard of Oz at Sphere (2025), an immersive 4D version of 1939 film created specifically to screen at Sphere in the Las Vegas Valley.
- Although not a direct adaptation to the literature itself, the 2013 Super Sentai series, Zyuden Sentai Kyoryuger features the Deboth Army's members being themed after the characters in The Wonderful Wizard of Oz. Raging Knight Dogold is an Oni-themed member designed with the motif of the Lion, whose loss of Utsusemimaru as his host parallels his source of inspiration joining Dorothy to earn courage. In Power Rangers Dino Charge, he was adapted as Fury.

== Speculated origins ==
In the original Oz books, the Lion's origins were never explicitly stated. However, many works since then have either hinted at or revealed elements of backstory for the Lion. Partly due to the large amount of written material about Oz, many of these stories are contradictory to each other or to the "Famous Forty" Oz books, and many fans do not accept them as canonical. The canonical books give no indication the Lion did not originate in Oz, essentially as a normal, if unique, lion.

A skittish and fearful lion cub is seen at Shiz University in Gregory Maguire's novel, Wicked: The Life and Times of the Wicked Witch of the West. The cub had been the result of cruel experiments by Dr. Dillamond's replacement teacher, in the musical, it was an agent of the Wizard, and was saved by Elphaba and some other students. This is heavily hinted to be a younger form of the Lion. The Tin Woodman confirms this in the Broadway musical adaptation Wicked, in the song "March of the Witch Hunters": "And the lion also has a grievance to repay! If she'd let him fight his own battles when he was young, he wouldn't be a coward today!"

Maguire's third book in the Wicked Years, A Lion Among Men, is told primarily from the Lion's viewpoint, and its plot is centered around Brrr's account of his own origins, or lack thereof, he is unsure, as his narration begins, of the whereabouts of his parents, pride, etc.

The book Lion of Oz and the Badge of Courage and its accompanying animated feature, Lion of Oz, show the Lion as having grown up in a circus in America. His caretaker, Oscar Diggs, was the man who would become the Wizard of Oz; this man took the Lion on a balloon ride one night, which resulted in the two becoming stranded in Oz.

The film Oz the Great and Powerful shows Oscar Diggs driving away an attacking lion with a smoke bomb, suggesting that this lion is Dorothy's future companion.

In the 2017 TV series Emerald City, the Lion is a former guard in the Wizard's army who is cursed into the form of a beast for his actions against the former Royal Family of Oz.

== Political interpretations ==
Some historians, such as Henry M. Littlefield in American Quarterly, have suggested that Baum modeled the Cowardly Lion after politician William Jennings Bryan, or politicians in general.

== See also ==
- Lions in literature
