= The Wiz =

1974 musical based on the 1900 book The Wonderful Wizard of Oz

- The Super Soul Musical "Wonderful Wizard of Oz"
- Original Cast Recording
- Music: Charlie Smalls; Timothy Graphenreed; Harold Wheeler; George Faison; Luther Vandross
- Lyrics: Charlie Smalls; Zachary Walzer; Luther Vandross
- Book: William F. Brown
- Basis: The Wonderful Wizard of Oz by L. Frank Baum
- Productions: 1974 Detroit tryout 1974 Philadelphia tryout 1975 Broadway; 1976 US tour 1984 Broadway revival 2024 Broadway revival
- Awards: Tony Award for Best Musical; Tony Award for Best Original Score

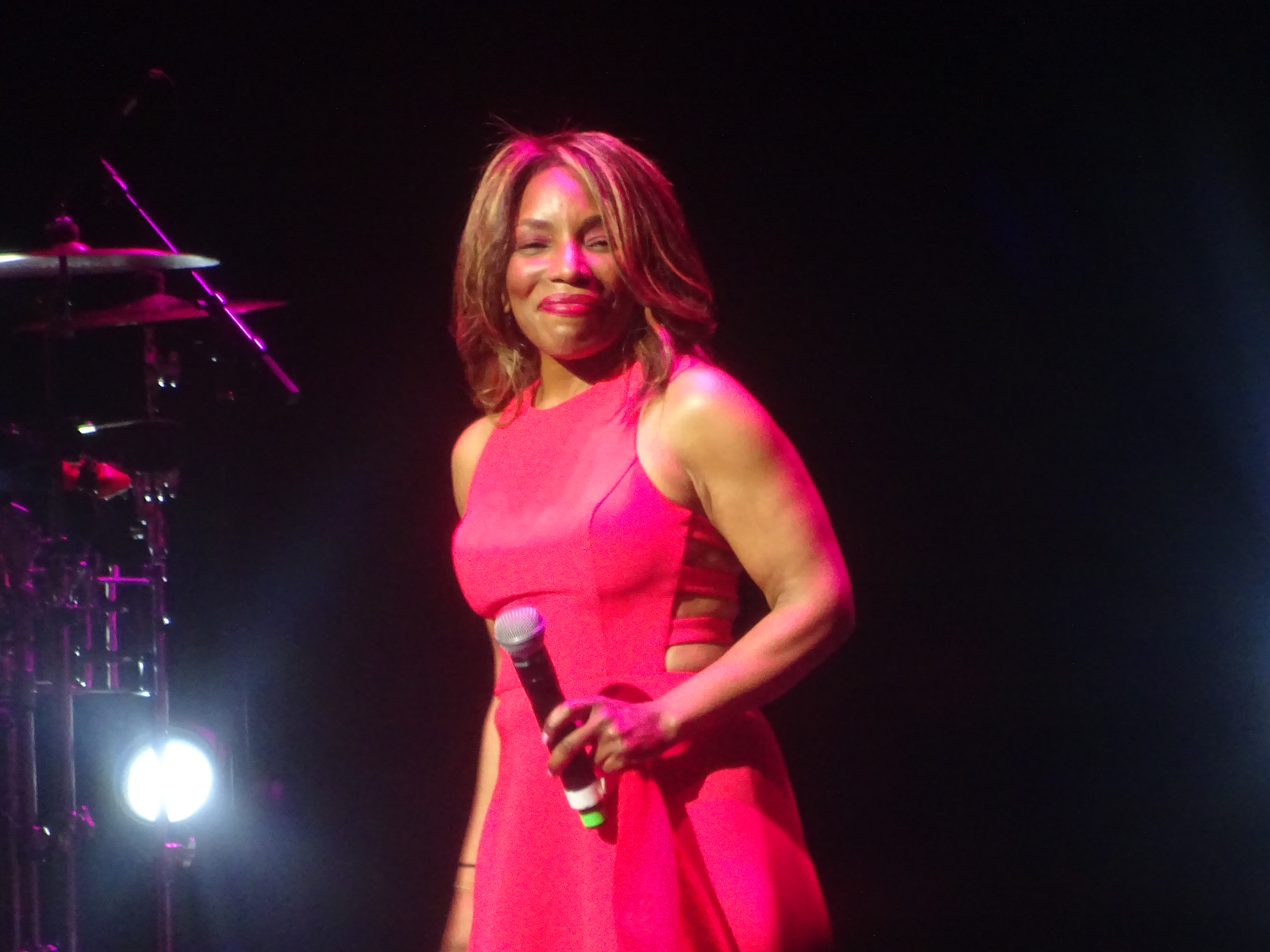
Stephanie Mills (pictured in 2017) played Dorothy in the original 1975 Broadway musical The Wiz.

The Wiz: The Super Soul Musical "Wonderful Wizard of Oz" is a musical with music and lyrics by Charlie Smalls (and others) and book by William F. Brown. It is a retelling of L. Frank Baum's children's novel The Wonderful Wizard of Oz in the context of contemporary African-American culture. It opened on October 21, 1974, at the Morris A. Mechanic Theatre in Baltimore, and moved to Broadway's Majestic Theatre with a new cast on January 5, 1975.

The 1975 Broadway production was nominated for eight Tony Awards winning seven including Best Musical. It was an early example of Broadway's mainstream acceptance of works with an all-Black cast. It has had revivals in New York, London, San Diego, and the Netherlands, and a limited-run revival was presented by Encores! at New York City Center in June 2009. A big-budget film adaptation of the same name was released in 1978, with Ted Ross and Mabel King reprising their stage roles. The Wiz Live!, a television production of the stage musical, was broadcast on NBC in December 2015.

== Production history ==
=== Development and Broadway ===
The idea for the musical originated with producer Ken Harper. He replaced the original director, Gilbert Moses, with Geoffrey Holder in Detroit during out-of-town tryouts. As cast member André De Shields, who played the title role, later wrote, "It was Geoffrey's masterful people skills and embrace of magical realism that metamorphosed The Wiz from caterpillar to butterfly."

The original Baltimore cast included Stephanie Mills as Dorothy Gale, Stu Gilliam as the Scarecrow, Tiger Haynes as the Tin Man, Ted Ross as the Cowardly Lion, and Butterfly McQueen as the Queen of the Field Mice, but in a much smaller role. Renée C. Harris stayed on as understudy for the role of Dorothy, as did McQueen for the role of Addaperle.

The production was choreographed by George Faison, with scenic designer Tom H. John, costumes by Geoffrey Holder, lighting by Tharon Musser, and orchestrations by Harold Wheeler. Faison and Holder both won Tony Awards for choreography and costume design, respectively at the 29th Tony Awards in 1975.

The show had a pre-Broadway tryout at the Fisher Theatre in Detroit in November 1974, and at the Forrest Theatre in Philadelphia from December 11, 1974, through December 21, 1974. After drawing mixed critical reviews, producer Ken Harper considered closing the musical after its Broadway opening night. One source attributes its turnaround success to a publicity campaign that included a TV commercial featuring the cast singing "Ease On Down the Road," a song that proved so popular that it was released as a single recorded by the disco group Consumer Rapport; The single hit the Billboard Soul Singles chart, peaking at No. 19 and the Hot 100, peaking at No. 42.

William F. Brown, who wrote the book, gave a more specific explanation in 1993: "20th Century-Fox, the musical's major investor, put in another $100,000 to keep it going and everyone agreed to royalty cuts until the production's cost—about $1.1 million—was recouped....By the eighth week, we were selling out."

The Broadway production moved to the Broadway Theatre on May 25, 1977, and closed on January 28, 1979, after four years and 1,672 performances.

Along with other musicals including Purlie (1971) and Raisin (1974), The Wiz was a breakthrough for Broadway, a large-scale big-budget musical featuring an all-Black cast. It laid the foundation for later African-American hits such as Bubbling Brown Sugar, Dreamgirls and Sophisticated Ladies.

=== National tours and later revivals ===
The musical toured the US in 1976 and during the tour, Kenneth Kamal Scott (then billed as "Kamal") replaced André De Shields as the Wiz, Renn Woods was cast as Dorothy but departed the tour after playing only a couple of cities because during the show's engagement at the Ahmanson Theatre in Los Angeles, the 19-year-old performer was recruited for a featured part in the movie production of Hair. Renee C. Harris (who was in her very early 20s) took over as the tour's Dorothy and continued leading that company for a couple of years playing many engagements in cities across the country. At this time, the production also featured Ben Harney as the Tin Man and Ken Prymus as the Lion. Prymus was known to audiences for his featured role as Private Seidman in the movie M*A*S*H (1970) where he sang "Suicide is Painless". Both men were subsequently featured in other Broadway shows and were as replacements in the Broadway production of Ain't Misbehavin'. Harney also originated the leading role of Curtis Taylor Jr. in the Broadway debut of Dreamgirls. When Harris eventually departed the company, the tour continued with Deborah Malone in the role of Dorothy. There was also a second national touring company which was a scaled down production. This second tour opened with Malone reprising her role as Dorothy, who was later replaced by Lillias White.

A revival ran on Broadway at the Lunt-Fontanne Theatre from May 24, 1984, through June 3, 1984, closing after 13 performances and 7 previews. Directed by Geoffrey Holder, the cast featured Stephanie Mills as Dorothy. It then ran in London at the Lyric Hammersmith from December 11, 1984, through February 2, 1985. A planned 2004 Broadway revival was not produced.

In August 2015, George Faison presented The Wiz: A Celebration in Dance and Music, performances of the original songs and choreography in honor of the Broadway hits 40th Anniversary at Summerstage in New York City. A number of members of the original Broadway cast returned for this celebratory run. Actress Phylicia Rashad, a munchkin and swing in the original production, co-hosted the performance with George Faison. André De Shields reprised his original role as the Wiz; Dee Dee Bridgewater, Tony Award winner for her role as Glinda, reprised her original role; Evelyn Thomas reprised her original role as the Tornado and Ebony Jo-Ann who played Addaperle in the Broadway revival of the production reprised her role as well. Singer-songwriter Wallace Gary joined the cast as the Scarecrow. Damien L. Sneed acted as the musical director and conductor of The Wiz: A Celebration in Dance and Music.

From 1996 to 1997 there was a US concert version tour with Tasha Scott as Dorothy, Grace Jones as Evillene, Peabo Bryson as The Wiz, and CeCe Peniston as Glinda. The cast also featured Tony Terry as the Tin Man and Romelda Benjamin as Aunt Em.

A North American tour, directed by Schele Williams with new material by Amber Ruffin, launched in the fall of 2023 in Baltimore with plans to transfer to Broadway for a limited engagement in spring 2024. The Broadway revival opened at the Marquis Theatre on April 17, 2024 with previews beginning March 29, 2024. The production concluded its limited engagement on August 18, 2024 after 18 preview performances and 142 regular performances. The tour then resumed performances beginning February 2025 starring Alan Mingo Jr. and Mykal Kilgore.

=== Other productions ===
An Australian production for J. C. Williamson Theatres Limited played in Melbourne and Sydney from January–October 1976; starring Andrea Frierson (Dorothy), Victor Willis (Tin Man), Freddie Paris (Lion), Chuck McKinney (The Wiz) and Robert Ellis (Scarecrow). Upon his return from Australia in late 1976, Victor Willis joined the cast of the original Broadway production.

Flymonkey Productions (London) ran two shows. The first one was in 2000 which received great reviews and a second was run the following year in 2001 receiving exceptional reviews from the London press. Both productions were run at the Hackney Empire. The 2001 show was particularly notable because it was the last show to be performed at the Hackney Empire before the theatre closed its doors for refurbishment. Both shows were directed by Jamie Hinde; musical director Steve White (both shows); production manager Andy Barnes (both shows); choreography by Suzannah Howlett (2000) and Juliet Vibert (2001, also appeared as a dancer in both shows). The production starred Tamsier Joof Aviance (both shows); Rustie Lee (both shows); Sharon D. Clarke (2000), Victoria Wilson-James (2001), and Kat Boyce of MTV (both shows).

A production ran at the La Jolla Playhouse, San Diego, from September 26, 2006, through November 12, 2006, receiving good reviews and extending its run by three weeks. It was directed by Des McAnuff, who, with Harold Wheeler, orchestrator of the original Broadway version, revised the musical for contemporary audiences. It starred Nikki M. James (Dorothy), E. Faye Butler (Evelline) and David Alan Grier (The Wiz), and featured sets by Robert Brill.

Dodger Productions holds US rights to revive the musical, while Joop Van den Ende's Stage Entertainment holds the European rights. Stage Entertainment mounted a full-scale production at the Beatrix Theater in Utrecht, Netherlands, in 2006. The production was directed by Glenn Casale and choreographed by Anthony Van Laast and featured sets by David Gallo.

New York City Center's Encores! Summer Stars series production ran June 12 through July 5, 2009. The production was directed by Thomas Kail and choreographed by Andy Blankenbuehler. It starred Ashanti as Dorothy, Tichina Arnold as Evillene, Dawnn Lewis as Addaperle, Joshua Henry as the Tin Man, James Monroe Iglehart as the Lion, Orlando Jones (succeeded by Colman Domingo) as The Wiz, and LaChanze as Aunt Em and Glinda.

A major British revival of the musical was produced in 2011 by the Birmingham Repertory Theatre (however performed at the New Alexandra Theatre due to The REP's refurbishment) in a co-production with the West Yorkshire Playhouse, re-locating Kansas to present day Birmingham This production was directed by Josette Bushell-Mingo, with choreography by Paul J. Medford.

The first German-speaking production was produced in Linz, Austria in the new Musiktheater Linz, directed and choreographed by Kim Duddy.

The Fiddlehead Theatre Company, in the historic Strand Theatre in Dorchester, Boston, Massachusetts, mounted a production, directed by Stacey Stephens, Fiddlehead Theatre Company's associate producing artistic director, in February 2015.

A production ran at The Muny from June 19–25, 2018. It starred Nathan Lee Graham as The Wiz, James T. Lane as Tinman, Darius de Haas as Lion, Demetria McKinney as Glinda, and newcomers Danyel Fulton and Jared Grimes as Dorothy and Scarecrow, respectively. It was directed by Denis Jones and choreographed by Camille A. Brown.

The Hope Mill Theatre, Manchester mounted a production that ran from November 24, 2021, until January 16, 2022, with the cast including Tarik Frimpong as the Scarecrow. The production was recorded and streamed as an encore production, and performances from it were broadcast by the BBC as part of Big Night of Musicals by the National Lottery.

A Mexican production ran from June 2023 to September 2024 at Teatro Hidalgo in Mexico City for over 200 performances. Produced by Juan Torres and directed by Ricardo Díaz, the show was choreographed by Pablo Rodríguez. Set design was by Oscar Acosta. The show starred Lucero Mijares in her theatre debut as Dorothy, Oscar Acosta as the Tin Man, Juan Fonsalido as the Scarecrow, Felipe Alvarez as the Lion, and Jair Campos as the Wiz.

== Plot ==
=== Prologue ===
Teenaged Dorothy Gale lives with her Aunt Em, Uncle Henry, and dog, Toto, on their farm in Kansas. Though her work there keeps her busy, she often gets distracted in her boredom with farm life, choosing instead to play with Toto and dream of someday seeing far-off lands. Aunt Em, however, has little patience for her daydreaming, believing that dawdling is contrary to their way of life. After an argument, Aunt Em apologizes to her for an unintentionally hurtful remark. She explains that she only scolds because she wants Dorothy to be the best she can be, and fears that she will not be prepared for the responsibilities life will soon put upon her. Aunt Em loves her dearly and hopes they will always be as close as they were when she was younger ("The Feeling We Once Had").

=== Act I ===
When an approaching storm turns out to be a tornado, Dorothy takes shelter in the farmhouse as Aunt Em and Uncle Henry do so in the storm cellar. As the tornado hits the farm, the house, with Dorothy inside, is lifted into the air and flies for miles, with the wind represented by dancers ("Tornado"). The house finally comes to rest with a bump in the middle of a field covered with flowers. There Dorothy is met by the Munchkins, all of whom are dressed in blue, and Addaperle, the Good Witch of the North, who tells her that she is in the Land of Oz. Furthermore, her house has fallen on Evamean, the Wicked Witch of the East, and killed her, freeing the Munchkins from her evil powers. Dorothy, distressed and confused, wants only to return home. With her magic unable to take Dorothy beyond the country boundaries, Addaperle decides Dorothy's best chance for assistance is to follow the Yellow Brick Road to the Emerald City in the center of Oz, to see the great and powerful Wizard of Oz, or "The Wiz" for short ("He's the Wizard"). She gives her Evamean's silver shoes, and tells her not to take them off before she reaches home, for they hold a mysterious, but very powerful charm that will keep her safe.

Dorothy sets off down the Yellow Brick Road, full of doubt and fear at what lies ahead ("Soon As I Get Home"). Stopping to rest by a cornfield, she is startled when a scarecrow hanging on a pole strikes up a conversation with her ("I Was Born on the Day Before Yesterday"). He tells her of his longing for brains so that he can be like other people, and she invites him to accompany her to see if the Wizard can help him. ("Ease On Down the Road #1").

The Yellow Brick Road leads them into a great forest where they discover a man made of tin, rusted solid. They oil his joints ("Slide Some Oil To Me") and he tells them how Evamean put a spell on his axe so that it began to cut off parts of his body. Each time it happened, a tinsmith replaced each missing part with one made of tin until he was entirely made of it. The one thing the tinsmith forgot was a heart, and he has longed for one ever since. Dorothy and the Scarecrow invite him on their journey to see the Wizard with the hope that he may give him one ("Ease On Down the Road #2").

They continue following the Yellow Brick Road deeper into the forest, where they are attacked by a large lion ("I'm a Mean Ole Lion"). However, he is quickly revealed to be a coward hiding behind bravado as Dorothy stands up for her friends. When he learns where they are going, he apologizes and asks if he may accompany them to ask the Wizard for some courage. They agree and the trio becomes a quartet ("Ease On Down the Road #3"), but face a new danger when they are attacked by an evil tribe of forest monsters called Kalidahs ("Kalidah Battle"). After a great fight and harrowing escape, they stop by the road to rest. The Lion is embarrassed by his cowardice in the battle, but is comforted by Dorothy's kind words ("Be a Lion").

Seeing a green glow in the distance, they continue their journey to the Emerald City, and wander into a field of poppies who blow opium dust on them. Dorothy recalls that Addaperle warned her of these poppies, and runs from the field as fast as she can with the Scarecrow and Tin Man behind her. The Lion is overcome by the dust and begins to hallucinate ("Lion's Dream"). He is dragged from the field and returned to his friends by the Mice Squad who police the area.

Marching up to the gates of the Emerald City, they are met by the Gatekeeper who insists they must all be fitted with a pair of green tinted glasses that are locked on to prevent them being blinded by the dazzling sights. They enter the city and look about in awe at the richly dressed people that inhabit it ("Emerald City Ballet"). The haughty and condescending people laugh and ridicule this odd group for wanting to see the Wizard until they see that Dorothy is wearing Evamean's silver shoes. They are promptly shown right into his palace.

Once in the throne room, they are assaulted by a great show of lights, smoke, and pyrotechnics as the Wizard appears before them ("So You Wanted To Meet the Wizard"). They each plead their case to him, the Tin Man doing so in song ("What Would I Do If I Could Feel?"). He agrees on one condition: they must kill Evillene, the Wicked Witch of the West. With their goals seeming further out of reach than ever before, they sink to the floor in despair.

=== Act II ===
Evillene rules over the land of the west, enslaving its people, the Winkies. She is evil, power hungry, and ruthlessly determined to get her hands on her sister's silver shoes, so that she may increase her power and rule over all of Oz ("Don't Nobody Bring Me No Bad News"). Receiving word of Dorothy and her friends approaching, she sends her Winged Monkeys to kill them ("Funky Monkeys"). Catching up to them in the forest surrounding her castle, the monkeys dash the Tin Man against rocks until he falls apart, and rip the straw out of the Scarecrow, leaving both of them helpless. Seeing Dorothy's silver shoes, however, they dare not harm her. Instead, they carry her to Evillene's castle along with the Lion. While searching for a way to get the shoes from Dorothy, Evillene forces her and the Lion to do menial chores around her castle. She takes delight in torturing the Lion before Dorothy, threatening to have him skinned unless she hands over the silver shoes. Angered by this, she picks up a bucket of water and throws it over Evillene, who melts away. Her spell on the Winkies is lifted, and they show their thanks by restoring the Scarecrow and Tin Man to top condition, and reuniting the group ("Everybody Rejoice/A Brand New Day").

Returning to the Emerald City, they see the Wizard (now a booming voice that seems to come from the very air). He reneges on his promise, and the Lion turns a crank revealing a door. Behind it stands a bewildered man, in pajamas and pink curls in his hair, who claims to be the Wizard. He shows them the elaborate mechanical effects used to create his illusions, and tells them that he is really a balloonist from Omaha named Herman Smith who traveled to Oz by accident when his hot air balloon drifted off course. The Ozians had never seen such a sight and proclaimed him Wizard. Not wanting to disappoint them, he assumed the role and had a great city built. He then had everyone in it wear green glasses, and in time, they came to believe it was green.

Furious, the group confronts the Wizard on his deceptions ("Who Do You Think You Are?"), but he points out that the Scarecrow, Tin Man, and Lion already have the things they seek as shown in their behavior on the journeys they have made ("Believe In Yourself"). They remain unconvinced, so he creates physical symbols of their desires and they are satisfied. He proposes that Dorothy can return to Kansas the way he came, and offers to pilot her in his hot air balloon. He addresses the citizens of the Emerald City in person for the first time in many years, telling them of his imminent journey ("Y'all Got It!"). Just as his speech reaches its climax, the balloon comes free from its moorings and rises quickly into the air, taking Dorothy's hopes of getting home with it.

Just as the group despairs of finding help, Addaperle reappears in a flash of light, suggesting that Dorothy ask Glinda, the Good Witch of the South, for assistance. She transports them to Glinda's castle in the red land of the south, where they are warmly welcomed and invited to rest after their many trials ("A Rested Body Is a Rested Mind"). Glinda is a beautiful and gracious sorceress, surrounded by a court of her Quadlings. She tells Dorothy that the silver shoes have always had the power to take her home, but like her friends, she needed to believe in their magic and in herself before it was possible ("If You Believe"). She bids a tearful goodbye to her friends, and as their faces fade into the darkness, she thinks about what she has gained, lost, and learned throughout her journey through Oz ("Home"). Clicking her heels together three times, she finds herself transported back to Kansas in an instant. As an overjoyed Toto appears, and she runs to hug him, she knows that she is back home at last.

== Motion picture and television adaptations ==
Motown Productions acquired the film rights to The Wiz in 1977 and signed Stephanie Mills in anticipation of having her star as Dorothy in the film adaptation. Motown singer and actress Diana Ross asked Motown CEO Berry Gordy to cast her instead, but he declined, feeling that the then-33-year-old Ross was far too old for the part. However, she contacted Rob Cohen of Universal Pictures, who offered to have them finance the film if she were to play Dorothy, at which point he acquiesced.

The resulting film version of The Wiz also starred former Motown star Michael Jackson as the Scarecrow, Nipsey Russell as the Tin Man, Richard Pryor as the Wizard, jazz singer Thelma Carpenter as Miss One (the name "Addaperle" was not used for this production) and Lena Horne as Glinda. Ted Ross and Mabel King reprised their roles of the Lion and Evillene from the Broadway production respectively. Sidney Lumet served as director, working with screenwriter Joel Schumacher (who used none of William F. Brown's stage script) and music supervisor Quincy Jones. The film was a critical and commercial failure, performing poorly at the box office and severely panned by critics, who branded the casting of Ross instead of Mills as Dorothy a disastrous blunder.

In 1998, following their TV-movie production of Cinderella (1997), producers Craig Zadan and Neil Meron began pre-production on a TV-movie adaptation of The Wiz for The Wonderful World of Disney, which was to star a then-unknown Anika Noni Rose as Dorothy. The project fell through due to Universal still having the film rights to adaptations of The Wiz, and the production was shelved. The O.Z., a hip-hop re-adaptation of The Wonderful Wizard of Oz with an all-Black cast that was to use original music rather than adapt The Wiz, was then planned by FOX and director Chris Stokes in the early 2000s. With Brandy, Queen Latifah, Patti LaBelle, Busta Rhymes, and Little Richard among its planned cast, the telefilm ultimately went un-produced; FOX instead became a co-producer on The Muppets' Wizard of Oz (2005), starring Ashanti as Dorothy and Latifah as Aunt Em.

Eleven years later, following the production of two live musicals for NBC – The Sound of Music Live! (2013) and Peter Pan Live! (2014) – Zadan and Meron announced The Wiz Live! as their next production (NBC, by this point, having purchased Universal Studios). NBC's live performance of the stage show aired on December 3, 2015. Stephanie Mills, who originated the role of Dorothy on Broadway, played Aunt Em. An open casting call for the role of Dorothy took place on June 6, 2015. In July 2015, Queen Latifah was cast as the Wiz and Mary J. Blige was confirmed to play the role of Evillene. In addition, Beyoncé was offered to play Glinda, but no deal was made. The following month, David Alan Grier was cast as the Cowardly Lion, and newcomer Shanice Williams was chosen to play Dorothy. Uzo Aduba played Glinda and Amber Riley portrayed Addaperle, the Good Witch of the North. Other principal cast-members included Elijah Kelley as the Scarecrow, Ne-Yo as the Tin Man, and Common as the Bouncer, the gatekeeper of the entrance to Emerald City.

== Instrumentation and chorus ==
The orchestra calls for 2 keyboards, 2 guitars, electric bass, drums, percussion, 2 trumpets, trombone, 2 woodwinds and a 5-piece chorus (4 male and 1 female). The first keyboard is played by the conductor. One guitarist plays lead while the other guitarist plays rhythm. The first woodwind player doubles on tenor and alto saxophones and flute while the second one doubles on tenor, alto and baritone saxophones and flute.

== Cast ==
Role	Detroit	Broadway	US Tour	Broadway Revival	US Tour	Broadway Revival
Role	1974	1975	1976	1984	2023	2024
Dorothy Gale	Stephanie Mills	Stephanie Mills	Renn Woods	Stephanie Mills	Nichelle Lewis	Nichelle Lewis
Scarecrow	Stu Gilliam	Hinton Battle	Charles Valentino	Charles Valentino	Avery Wilson	Avery Wilson
Tin Man	Tiger Haynes	Tiger Haynes	Ben Harney	Howard Porter	Phillip Johnson Richardson	Phillip Johnson Richardson
The Lion	Ted Ross	Ted Ross	Ted Ross	Gregg Baker	Kyle Ramar Freeman	Kyle Ramar Freeman
Glinda	Dee Dee Bridgewater	Dee Dee Bridgewater	Dee Dee Bridgewater	Ann Duquesnay	Deborah Cox	Deborah Cox
Aunt Em	Tasha Thomas	Tasha Thomas	Dee Dee Bridgewater	Peggi Blu	Melody Betts	Melody Betts
Evillene	Mabel King	Mabel King	Ella Mitchell	Ella Mitchell	Melody Betts	Melody Betts
The Wiz	André De Shields	André De Shields	André De Shields	Carl Hall	Wayne Brady Alan Mingo Jr.	Wayne Brady Alan Mingo Jr.
Addaperle	Clarice Taylor	Clarice Taylor	Vivian Bonnell	Juanita Flemming	Allyson Kaye Daniel	Allyson Kaye Daniel

=== Notable replacements ===
Broadway (1975–1979)

- Scarecrow: Gregg Burge
- Tin Man: Ben Harney
- Lion: James Wigfall, Michael Leslie, Ken Page
- Aunt Em: Esther Marrow
- The Wiz: Carl Hall, Alan Weeks
- Evillene: Theresa Merritt, Irene Reid, Ella Mitchell

US tour (1976–1979)

- Lion: Ron Taylor
- Aunt Em & Glinda: Peggi Blu
- The Wiz: Robert Monroe
- Evillene: Carolyn Miller

== Songs ==
Act 1

1. "Overture" – Orchestra
2. "The Feeling We Once Had" – Aunt Em
3. "Tornado" – Company
4. "Which Where, Which What, Witch Why?" – Addaperle (cut from pre-Broadway tryouts 1974)
5. "He's the Wiz" – Addaperle and Munchkins
6. "Soon as I Get Home" – Dorothy
7. "I Was Born on the Day Before Yesterday" – Scarecrow
8. "Ease on Down the Road #1" – Dorothy and Scarecrow
9. "Slide Some Oil to Me" – Tin Man
10. "Ease on Down the Road #2 " – Dorothy, Scarecrow and Tin Man
11. "Mean Ole Lion" – Lion
12. "Ease on Down the Road #3" – Dorothy, Scarecrow, Tin Man and Lion
13. "Kalidah Battle" – The Company
14. "Be a Lion" – Dorothy and Lion
15. "Lion's Dream" – Lion and Poppies
16. "Emerald City Ballet (Psst)" – Company
17. "So You Wanted to Meet the Wizard" – Wizard
18. "What Would I Do if I Could Feel" – Tin Man

Act 2

1. "Entr'acte"
2. "No Bad News" – Evilene and Winkies
3. "Funky Monkeys" – Company
4. "Wonder Wonder Why" / "Don't Cry Girl" – Dorothy and Lion (cut from pre-Broadway tryouts in 1974, and only appeared in 1983 revival)
5. "Everybody Rejoice/A Brand New Day" – Company
6. "Who Do You Think You Are?" – Dorothy, Scarecrow, Tin Man, and Lion
7. "Believe in Yourself" – Wiz
8. "Y'all Got It!" – Wiz and Company
9. "A Rested Body" – Glinda and Company
10. "Believe in Yourself" (Reprise) – Glinda
11. "Home/Finale" – Dorothy

All numbers composed by Charlie Smalls save for the following: "Tornado" is composed by Timothy Graphenreed and Harold Wheeler. "Emerald City Ballet (Psst)" is composed by Graphenreed and George Faison. "Everybody Rejoice/A Brand New Day" is composed by Luther Vandross. The song "Wonder, Wonder, Why" was added for the 1984 Broadway revival, but is not part of the current licensed score.

== Critical reception ==
In his review of the 1984 revival, Frank Rich wrote: "What made The Wiz surprisingly moving the first time around was that its creators found a connection between Baum's Kansas fantasy and the pride of urban Black Americans. When Glinda, the good witch, musically instructed Dorothy to 'believe in herself,' she seemed to be delivering a broader inspirational message. The Wiz was hardly a great musical in 1975, but it had something to say, and it said it with verve and integrity. It's depressing to watch a once-fervent expression of Black self-respect and talent be spilled on the stage as if it were a trunkload of marked-down, damaged goods."

In their review of the 2006 La Jolla production, Variety wrote: "'The Wiz' remains a collage of contemporary slang and imagery, but La Jolla's is a multicultural collage in which Baum's themes speak to the broadest possible audience. Unquestionably, the humor and the heartbeat of the piece remain African-American at their source, but the overall effect is pluralistic and inclusive. In the truest and most positive sense of the phrase, McAnuff's show is color-blind. Every alteration from the 1975 original, inspired by the central multicultural concept, is salutary. Brown's almost wholly rewritten script is tart and funny at last. Smalls' score—supervised by musical director Ron Melrose and original orchestrator Harold Wheeler—sounds fresh and contemporary".

As critic Peter Filichia wrote in 2015, "Arguably more impressive is Stephen Sondheim's opinion. Whenever he's asked for a favorite show that he didn't write, he immediately says The Wiz. What?! With all its false rhymes?! 'Because,' he always says, 'it's the one show which makes you feel better when you come out of it than you did when you walked in.'"

== Recording ==
The original cast recording for The Wiz was released in 1975 on the Atlantic label, produced by Jerry Wexler. While well received, the album omits several key songs from the musical that were not recorded for the album – such as the show's overture, dance and accompaniment music. The "Tornado" instrumental was released as both a 7" single and a 12" extended single, while the show's musical arranger Harold Wheeler co-produced a cover of "Ease on Down the Road" with studio group Consumer Rapport that became a charting single in 1975, peaking at #42 on the Billboard Hot 100.

In 2017, the original Broadway cast recording of The Wiz was selected for preservation in the National Recording Registry by the Library of Congress as being "culturally, historically, or aesthetically significant."

== Awards and nominations ==
=== Original Broadway production ===
Year	Award	Category	Nominee	Result
1975	Tony Award	Best Musical		Won
1975	Tony Award	Best Book of a Musical	William F. Brown	Nominated
1975	Tony Award	Best Original Score	Charlie Smalls	Won
1975	Tony Award	Best Featured Actor in a Musical	Ted Ross	Won
1975	Tony Award	Best Featured Actress in a Musical	Dee Dee Bridgewater	Won
1975	Tony Award	Best Direction of a Musical	Geoffrey Holder	Won
1975	Tony Award	Best Choreography	George Faison	Won
1975	Tony Award	Best Costume Design	Geoffrey Holder	Won
1975	Drama Desk Award	Outstanding Musical		Won
1975	Drama Desk Award	Outstanding Actress in a Musical	Stephanie Mills	Nominated
1975	Drama Desk Award	Outstanding Featured Actor in a Musical	Ted Ross	Won
1975	Drama Desk Award	Outstanding Featured Actor in a Musical	Hinton Battle	Nominated
1975	Drama Desk Award	Outstanding Featured Actress in a Musical	Mabel King	Nominated
1975	Drama Desk Award	Outstanding Director of a Musical	Geoffrey Holder	Nominated
1975	Drama Desk Award	Outstanding Choreography	George Faison	Won
1975	Drama Desk Award	Outstanding Music and Lyrics	Charlie Smalls	Won
1975	Drama Desk Award	Outstanding Set Design	Tom H. John	Nominated
1975	Drama Desk Award	Outstanding Costume Design	Geoffrey Holder	Won

=== 2024 Broadway production ===
Year	Award	Category	Nominee	Result
2024	Theatre World Award		Nichelle Lewis	Won
2024	Theatre World Award		Phillip Johnson Richardson	Won
2024	Chita Rivera Awards	Outstanding Dancer in a Broadway Show	Phillip Johnson Richardson	Nominated
2024	Chita Rivera Awards	Outstanding Dancer in a Broadway Show	Avery Wilson	Nominated
2025	Grammy Awards	Grammy Award for Best Musical Theater Album		Nominated

== See also ==
- The Wizard of Oz (adaptations)—other adaptations of The Wonderful Wizard of Oz
