= Consumer Rapport =

Consumer Rapport was a disco studio group from New York City in the 1970s. Lead vocals were by Frank Floyd, who was a pit singer in the company of the Broadway musical The Wiz. The group is best known for their cover of "Ease On down the Road", from The Wiz, which was released as a single on Wing and a Prayer/Atlantic Records and hit number one on the Billboard Hot Dance Music/Club Play chart in 1975. It also hit the Billboard Soul Singles chart, peaking at #19 and the Hot 100, peaking at #42.

== See also ==
- List of number-one dance hits (United States)
- List of artists who reached number one on the US Dance chart
