= Robert Drumheller =

American set decorator

- Died: February 1, 1998
- Occupation: Set decorator
- Years active: 1967-1986

Robert Drumheller was an American set decorator. He was nominated for an Academy Award in the category Best Art Direction for the film The Wiz.

== Selected filmography ==
- The Wiz (1978)
