= Shanice Williams =

American actress and singer

- Education: American Musical and Dramatic Academy
- Occupations: Actress; singer
- Years active: 2015–present

Shanice Williams is an American actress and singer. She is known for her performance as the outspoken Johnnie Mae in The Six Triple Eight.

== Early life and education ==
She grew up in Rahway, New Jersey, until her last year in high school. She then moved to and attended high school in Rahway, New Jersey. Her mother, Andrea Holmes, is a postal worker; and her father, Shelton Williams, is a security guard.

She attended Rahway High School, where she performed as part of her school's drama program.

Williams studied briefly at the American Musical and Dramatic Academy in Los Angeles, but began her singing career in her grandfather's choir.

== Career ==
Her first major break was playing the role of Dorothy in The Wiz Live!, a televised program based on the 1975 Broadway theatrical production, The Wiz. Williams was selected for the role through an open casting call when she was 18 years old, which was a collaboration between NBC and the theatrical division of Cirque du Soleil.

In 2017 Williams starred in the HBO film Manic. For her role in this film, she won best actress in a drama at the New York Television Festival and best actress in a drama at SeriesFest.

In 2018 Williams made her New York stage and Off-Broadway debut in Little Rock, a play about the Little Rock Nine. A year later, Williams was cast as Little Red Riding Hood in the Hollywood Bowl production of Into the Woods which ran July 26–28.

== Filmography ==
Film and television roles
Year	Title	Role	Notes
2015	The Wiz Live!	Dorothy Gale	Television film
2017	Manic	Aurora	Short film
2018	Sunny Day	Lulu	Episode: "Clowning Around"
2019–2020	Perfect Harmony	Leanne	10 episodes
2021	The Last O.G.	Felicia	Episode: "The Negotiator"
2024	The Six Triple Eight	Johnnie Mae	
