= The Wiz (film) =

1978 film by Sidney Lumet

- Theatrical release poster
- Directed by: Sidney Lumet
- Screenplay by: Joel Schumacher
- Based on: The Wiz 1975 play by William F. Brown; The Wonderful Wizard of Oz 1900 novel by L. Frank Baum
- Produced by: Rob Cohen
- Starring: Diana Ross; Michael Jackson; Nipsey Russell; Ted Ross; Lena Horne; Richard Pryor
- Cinematography: Oswald Morris
- Edited by: Dede Allen
- Music by: Charlie Smalls
- Production company: Motown Productions
- Distributed by: Universal Pictures
- Release date: October 24, 1978
- Running time: 133 minutes
- Country: United States
- Language: English
- Budget: $24 million
- Box office: $22 million

The Wiz is a 1978 American musical contemporary fantasy film directed by Sidney Lumet. Adapted from the 1974 Broadway musical, the film reimagines the classic 1900 children's novel The Wonderful Wizard of Oz by L. Frank Baum with an African-American cast. Dorothy Gale, a 24-year-old teacher from Harlem, is transported to the magical urban-fantasy Land of Oz. While on an adventure in order to seek help from the Wiz, Dorothy encounters a Scarecrow, a Tin Man, a Cowardly Lion and a Wicked Witch.

Produced by Universal Pictures and Motown Productions, filming took place in Queens, New York City, from July to December 1977, with a cast starring Diana Ross, Michael Jackson (in his only feature film role), Nipsey Russell, Ted Ross, Mabel King, Theresa Merritt, Thelma Carpenter, Lena Horne and Richard Pryor. The story is reworked from William F. Brown's Broadway libretto by Joel Schumacher, and Quincy Jones supervised the adaptation of songs by Charlie Smalls and Luther Vandross. A handful of new songs, written by Jones and the songwriting team Nickolas Ashford and Valerie Simpson, were added for the project.

The Wiz was theatrically released the following year on October 24, 1978, to critical and commercial failure. Some critics unfavorably compared the film to its source material and took issue with the casting of Ross as Dorothy, while others criticized the direction of Lumet, who was considered a poor choice for directing a musical. Despite its initial failure, critics have become more favorable, and it has become a cult classic among audiences, Ross's fanbase, Jackson's fanbase and Oz enthusiasts. The 2015 live television adaptation The Wiz Live! is influenced by the film.

== Plot ==
A crowded Thanksgiving dinner brings a host of family together in a Harlem apartment, where 24-year-old elementary schoolteacher Dorothy Gale lives with her Aunt Em and Uncle Henry. She is teased by Aunt Em for having delayed moving out to start her life as an adult. While Dorothy cleans up after the meal, her dog Toto runs out the open kitchen door into a snowstorm. She retrieves him but finds herself trapped in the storm. A magical whirlwind made of snow materializes and transports them to the land of Oz.

As Dorothy descends from the atmosphere, she smashes through an electric "Oz" sign which falls upon and kills Evermean, the Wicked Witch of the East who rules Munchkinland. As a result, she frees the Munchkins who populate the playground into which she lands. The Munchkins' main benefactress, Miss One, is the Good Witch of the North, a magical "numbers runner" who gives Dorothy Evermean's charmed silver shoes. Since Dorothy is far from home, Miss One urges her to follow the yellow brick road to the Emerald City and seek the help of the powerful "Wiz". After telling her never to take the shoes off, Miss One and the Munchkins disappear and Dorothy is left to search for the road on her own.

The next morning, Dorothy happens upon a scarecrow made of garbage and saves him from being teased by humanoid crows. The Scarecrow hopes that the Wiz will give him the one thing he feels that he lacks: a brain. They discover the yellow brick road and begin their journey to the Emerald City. They eventually meet a man made out of tin in an abandoned amusement park and a cowardly lion who was banished from the jungle. The Tin Man and Lion join them on their quest to find the Wiz, hoping to gain a heart and courage, respectively. En route, the foursome escape from a haunted subway station and a group of prostitutes known as the "Poppy Girls", who seduce the Lion. The Lion feels ashamed of leading Dorothy into a trap, but she and the rest of the gang cheer him up.

Finally reaching the Emerald City - depicted as a rendition of the World Trade Center plaza, the quartet are granted an audience with the Wiz, who appears as a giant fire-breathing metallic head. He proclaims that he will only grant their wishes on the condition that they kill Evermean's sister, Evillene, the Wicked Witch of the West, who runs a sweatshop in Oz's underground sewers. Before they can reach her domain, Evillene learns of their quest to kill her and sends out her army of Flying Monkeys to capture them. As revenge on Dorothy for killing her sister, she dismembers the Scarecrow, flattens the Tin Man, and hangs the Lion up by his tail to make Dorothy give her the shoes. When she threatens to throw Toto into a fiery cauldron, Dorothy nearly gives in until the Scarecrow hints to her to activate a fire sprinkler switch. The sprinklers put out the fire and melt Evillene. With Evillene dead, her spells lose their power, resulting in the freedom of all her sweatshop workers and prisoners.

The Monkeys give Dorothy and her friends a ride back to the Emerald City. Upon going in the back entrance, they discover that the Wiz is actually Herman Smith, a washed-up politician from Atlantic City who came to Oz by accident in a hot air balloon. The Scarecrow, Tin Man, and Lion are distraught that they will never receive their brain, heart, and courage, but Dorothy makes them realize that they already have had these things all along even as she fears she will never find her own way home. Glinda, the Good Witch of the South, appears and implores her to use the magic of the slippers. After thanking Glinda and saying goodbye to her friends, she reminisces about home. She clicks her heels together three times and discovers that she is back near home with Toto in her arms.

== Cast ==
- Diana Ross as Dorothy Gale
- Michael Jackson as Scarecrow
- Nipsey Russell as Tinman
- Ted Ross as Cowardly Lion / Fleetwood Coupe DeVille
- Richard Pryor as Herman Smith / the Wiz
- Lena Horne as Glinda The Good Witch of the South
- Mabel King as Evillene The Wicked Witch of the West
- Thelma Carpenter as Miss One, the Good Witch of the North
- Theresa Merritt as Aunt Em
- Stanley Greene Sr. as Uncle Henry
- Johnny Brown as Guest at Aunt Em’s Party
- Derrick Bell, Roderick-Spencer Sibert, Kashka Banjoko and Ronald "Smokey" Stevens as The Four Crows
- Frank Welker as Toto the dog (voice effects)

== Soundtrack ==
All songs are written by Charlie Smalls, unless otherwise noted.

No.	Title	Writer(s)	Artist	Length
1.	"Overture Part I"			2:36
2.	"Overture Part II"			1:57
3.	"The Feeling That We Had"		Theresa Merritt and Chorus	3:26
4.	"Can I Go On?"	Quincy Jones, Nickolas Ashford and Valerie Simpson	Diana Ross	1:56
5.	"Tornado / Glinda's Theme"			1:10
6.	"He's the Wizard"		Thelma Carpenter and Chorus	4:09
7.	"Soon As I Get Home / Home"		Ross	4:04
8.	"You Can't Win"		Michael Jackson and The Four Crows	3:14
9.	"Ease On down the Road #1"		Ross and Jackson	3:55
10.	"What Would I Do If I Could Feel?"		Nipsey Russell	2:18
11.	"Slide Some Oil to Me"		Russell	2:51
12.	"Ease On down the Road #2"		Ross, Jackson and Russell	1:31
13.	"I'm a Mean Ole Lion"		Ted Ross	2:24
14.	"Ease On down the Road #3"		D. Ross, Jackson, T. Ross and Russell	1:26
15.	"Poppy Girls Theme"	Anthony Jackson		3:27
16.	"Be a Lion"		D. Ross, Jackson, T. Ross and Russell	4:04
17.	"End of the Yellow Brick Road"			1:01
18.	"Emerald City Sequence"	(music: Jones, lyrics: Smalls)	Chorus	6:44
19.	"Is This What Feeling Gets? (Dorothy's Theme)"	(music: Jones, lyrics: Ashford & Simpson)	Ross - (vocal version not used in film)	3:21
20.	"Don't Nobody Bring Me No Bad News"		Mabel King and the Winkies	3:03
21.	"Everybody Rejoice / A Brand New Day"	Luther Vandross	D. Ross, Jackson, T. Ross, Russell and Chorus	7:49
22.	"Believe in Yourself (Dorothy)"		Ross	2:55
23.	"The Good Witch Glinda"			1:09
24.	"Believe in Yourself (Reprise)"		Lena Horne	2:15
25.	"Home (Finale)"		Ross	4:03

== Production ==
=== Pre-production and development ===
The Wiz is the eighth feature film produced by Motown Productions, the film and television division of Berry Gordy's Motown Records label. Gordy originally wanted the teenaged R&B singer Stephanie Mills, who had originated the role on Broadway, to be cast as Dorothy Gale. When Motown star Diana Ross asked Gordy if she could be cast as Dorothy, he declined, saying that Ross—then 33 years old—was too old for the role. Ross went around Gordy and convinced executive producer Rob Cohen at Universal Pictures to arrange a deal in which he would produce the film if Ross was cast as Dorothy. Gordy and Cohen agreed to the deal. Additionally, the casting of Diana Ross as Dorothy was due to the fact that she was a well-known star, which guaranteed more funds. Pauline Kael, a film critic, described Ross's efforts to get the film into production as "perhaps the strongest example of sheer will in film history".

After filmmaker John Badham learned that Ross was cast as Dorothy, he decided not to direct, and Cohen replaced him with Sidney Lumet. Of his decision not to direct The Wiz, Badham recalled telling Cohen that he thought that Ross was "a wonderful singer. She's a terrific actress and a great dancer, but she's not this character. She's not the little six-year-old girl Dorothy in The Wizard of Oz." Lumet's hiring was met with skepticism, for he was known as a dramatic filmmaker with no previous musical directing experience.

Although 20th Century Fox had financially backed the stage musical, it exercised its first refusal rights to the film production, which gave Universal an opening to finance the film. Initially, Universal was so excited about the film's prospects that it did not set a budget for production.

=== Writing ===
Joel Schumacher's script is influenced by Werner Erhard's teachings and his Erhard Seminars Training ("est") movement because both Schumacher and Ross were "very enamored of Werner Erhard". "Before I knew it," said Rob Cohen, "the movie was becoming an est-ian fable full of est buzzwords about knowing who you are and sharing and all that. I hated the script a lot. But it was hard to argue with [Ross] because she was recognizing in this script all of this stuff that she had worked out in est seminars." Schumacher spoke positively of the results of the est training, stating that he was "eternally grateful for learning that I was responsible for my life". However, he also complained that "everybody stayed exactly the way they were and went around spouting all this bullshit". Regarding est and Erhard references in the film, The Grove Book of Hollywood notes that the speech delivered by Glinda the Good Witch (Lena Horne) at the end of the film was "a litany of est-like platitudes", and the book makes est comparisons to the song "Believe in Yourself". Although Schumacher had seen the Broadway play before writing the script, none of the play's writing was incorporated into the film, a fact that was noted and heavily criticized after release.

During production, Lumet felt that the finished film would be "an absolutely unique experience that nobody has ever witnessed before". When asked about any possible influence from MGM's popular 1939 film adaptation titled The Wizard of Oz, Lumet stated that "there was nothing to be gained from [the 1939 film] other than to make certain we didn't use anything from it. They made a brilliant movie, and even though our concept is different – they're Kansas, we're New York; they're white, we're black, and the score and the books are totally different – we wanted to make sure that we never overlapped in any area."

=== Casting ===
Michael Jackson, a former Motown star and close friend of Ross, was cast as the Scarecrow. At the start of development, he and his brothers The Jacksons (with the exception of Jermaine Jackson) had departed Motown for Epic Records in 1975, after the release of their tenth album Moving Violation (although Michael had not released a solo album since Forever, Michael). Cohen, head of Motown Productions, thought that Jackson would be perfect for the role of the Scarecrow, and approached Gordy with the idea. Gordy agreed, although Lumet was harder to convince. Lumet wanted Jimmie Walker, star of CBS-TV's Good Times, telling Cohen, "Michael Jackson's a Vegas act. The Jackson 5's a Vegas act."

Quincy Jones was also skeptical of Jackson, but after Cohen arranged a meeting, flying 18-year-old Jackson to New York, Lumet and Jones saw the qualities that Cohen saw. Jackson's father Joseph was wary of the project and saw it as a threat to the Jacksons group cohesion. Cohen moved Michael (and his sister La Toya) into a Manhattan apartment, allowing him to be on his own for the first time. During production, Jackson became a frequent visitor to New York's famous Studio 54. Jackson was dedicated to the Scarecrow role and watched videotapes of gazelles, cheetahs and panthers to learn graceful movements for his part.

The long hours of uncomfortable prosthetic makeup by Stan Winston did not bother him. During production, Jackson asked Quincy Jones who he would recommend as a producer on his yet unrecorded solo album project. Jones, impressed by Jackson's professionalism, talent and work ethic, offered to be the producer of what became Off the Wall (1979), Thriller (1982) and Bad (1987).

Ted Ross and Mabel King were brought in to reprise their respective roles of the Cowardly Lion and Evillene from the stage musical, while Nipsey Russell was cast as the Tin Man. Lena Horne, Lumet's mother-in-law at the time of production, was cast as Glinda the Good Witch, and Richard Pryor portrayed The Wiz. The film's choreographer was Louis Johnson.

=== Filming ===
Principal photography began on July 13, 1977, and concluded on December 29, 1977. It took place at Astoria Studios in Queens, New York. The decaying New York State Pavilion from the 1964 New York World's Fair was used as the set for Munchkinland, Meadow Lake Bridge was the first Yellow Brick Road scene after the Scarecrow was helped from his pole. Astroland at Coney Island was used for the Tin Man scene, with The Cyclone as a backdrop, while the World Trade Center served as the Emerald City. The Emerald City scenes were elaborate, using 650 dancers, 385 crew members and 1,200 costumes. Costume designer Tony Walton enlisted the help of high fashion designers in New York City for the Emerald City sequence, and obtained exotic costumes and fabric from designers such as Oscar de la Renta and Norma Kamali. Albert Whitlock created the film's visual special effects, while Stan Winston served as the head makeup artist.

=== Songs and score ===
Quincy Jones served as musical supervisor and music producer. He later wrote that he initially did not want to work on the film, but did it as a favor to Lumet. The film marked Jones's first time working with Jackson, and would eventually produce three hit albums for Jackson: Off the Wall (1979), Thriller (1982) and Bad (1987). Jones recalled working with Jackson as one of his favorite experiences from The Wiz, and spoke of Jackson's dedication to his role, comparing his acting style to Sammy Davis Jr. Jones had a brief cameo appearance during the "Gold" segment of the Emerald City sequence, playing what looks like a fifty-foot grand piano.

Of the 28 numbers originally composed by Charlie Smalls and company, 17 were retained in full or in part for the film. "Tornado Ballet", "I Was Born on the Day Before Yesterday", "Kalidah Battle", "Lion's Dream", "Emerald City Ballet (Psst)", "So You Wanted to Meet the Wizard", the Act 2 Entr'acte, "Funky Monkeys", "Who Do You Think You Are?", "Y'all Got It", and "A Rested Body" were cut.

Four new numbers were added: "Can I Go On?", the instrumental "Poppy Girls Theme", "Emerald City Sequence" and "Is This What Feeling Gets? (Dorothy's Theme)" (the latter of which was cut from the film but featured on the soundtrack). "You Can't Win", a song originally written for the musical's Baltimore run that was cut after it was transferred to Broadway, was reincorporated.

== Release ==
The Wiz premiered at Loew's Astor Plaza in New York City on October 24, 1978, and also opened in five other theaters in the New York area. It opened on October 26 at the Cinerama Dome in Los Angeles and on October 27 in 29 other theaters, including in Chicago, Washington D.C., Philadelphia and Detroit. On November 3, it expanded to 67 theaters, and was due to open nationwide in 400 to 500 theaters on December 22.

To commemorate the 50th anniversary of the stage version's opening on Broadway, the film returned to theaters for a limited theatrical engagement on May 18 and 21, 2025.

=== Box office ===
The Wiz eventually proved to be a commercial failure, for the $24 million production earned only $13.6 million at the box office. The film did well in its opening week, grossing $942,814 from 36 theaters in 8 markets, finishing third at the US box office behind Midnight Express and Animal House. In its second week, grosses from the 36 theaters reduced by 12.6%, and, with additional theaters added, the film grossed $2.5 million after 10 days of release.

Although pre-release television broadcast rights had been sold to CBS for more than $10 million, the film ultimately produced a net loss of $10.4 million for Motown and Universal. At the time, it was the most expensive film musical ever made. For several years, the film's failure steered Hollywood studios away from producing the all-black film projects that had become popular during the blaxploitation era of the early-to-mid-1970s.

=== Home media ===
The Wiz was first released on VHS home video in 1981 by MCA/Universal Home Video (with a reissue in 1992) and was first broadcast on television on CBS on October 11, 1980, then on May 5, 1984 (edited to 100 minutes), to capitalize on Jackson's massive popularity at the time. It continues to be broadcast periodically on Black-focused networks, such as BET, TVOne and BET Her, and was the inaugural broadcast on the Bounce TV network. The Wiz is often broadcast on Thanksgiving (attributed to the opening scene of Dorothy's family gathered for a Thanksgiving dinner).

The film was released on DVD in 1999; a remastered version titled The Wiz: 30th Anniversary Edition was released in 2008. Extras on both DVD releases include a 1978 featurette about the film's production and the original theatrical trailer. A Blu-ray version was released in 2010. A new digitally restored version of the film was released on June 10, 2025, on 4K Ultra HD Blu-Ray and regular Blu-ray by The Criterion Collection.

== Reception ==
=== Critical reception ===
On the review aggregator website Rotten Tomatoes, 38% of 116 critics' reviews are positive. The website's consensus reads: "The Wiz is a workmanlike movie musical that lacks the electricity of the stage version and its cinematic inspiration, despite some committed performances from its all-star cast." Metacritic, which uses a weighted average, assigned the film a score of 53 out of 100, based on 11 critics, indicating "mixed or average" reviews.

Initial trade reviews for The Wiz from previews at Loew's State 2 in New York City were positive. Variety wrote that Universal had a "big, rousing, juicy hit on its hands that should enthrall the young in heart" and that the "cast is virtually flawless". It noted that the preview audience "roared, stomped, applauded" their approval of all the numbers. It also believed that it was the loudest film ever made. The overflowing crowd at the preview required a second showing.

Most professional critics published negative reviews for The Wiz upon its release. Many reviewers directed their criticism at Diana Ross; who, at 33 years old at the time of filming, was considered to be too old to play Dorothy. The Grove Book of Hollywood noted that "the picture finished off Diana Ross's screen career", for the film is Ross's final theatrical feature and her subsequent films premiered on television.

Hischak's Through the Screen Door: What Happened to the Broadway Musical When It Went to Hollywood criticized "Joel Schumacher's cockamamy screenplay", and called "Believe in Yourself" the score's weakest song. He described Diana Ross's portrayal of Dorothy as "cold, neurotic and oddly unattractive".

Leonard Maltin observed how The Wiz has “good musical numbers” and a “fine supporting cast,” but the movie was undermined by a “dreary finale” and “drearier performance” by Ross.

In his work History of the American Cinema, Harpole characterized the film as "one of the decade's biggest failures" and "the year's biggest musical flop".

In his 2004 book Blockbuster, Tom Shone referred to The Wiz as "expensive crud". In the book Mr. and Mrs. Hollywood, the author criticized the script, noting, "The Wiz was too scary for children, and too silly for adults." Ray Bolger, who played the Scarecrow in the 1939 film The Wizard of Oz, did not think highly of The Wiz, stating, "The Wiz is overblown and will never have the universal appeal that the classic MGM musical has obtained."

While Ross was largely the target of much criticism in The Wiz, some critics noticed a contrast in the music given to Ross (Dorothy) and the music given to her cast mates. John Skow of Time described the Tin Man's music as the "best characterization of the film". He also characterized Evelline's as a "menacing hard-rocker" and The Scarecrow's as a "piteous lament". Contrastingly, he describes Dorothy's music as dull ballads.

The decision to hire Sidney Lumet, a dramatic filmmaker without any prior experience with directing musicals, was criticized, with many critics believing his style was unsuited to the material or genre. The cinematography and production design, which replaced the fantastical Oz settings of the stage version with gritty urban cityscapes, were likewise criticized. While some critics described The Wiz as "dark, washed out, and boring", Lumet might have done this to reflect the urban setting and serious themes being presented. Critics also questioned the decision to cut large portions of the original score, in some cases substituting original compositions regarded as inferior.

Positive reviews included Charles Ryweck of The Hollywood Reporter who called it "truly film magic", and Stephen Traiman of Billboard who declared: "The Wiz is a wow!"Gene Siskel of the Chicago Tribune and Roger Ebert of the Chicago Sun-Times also gave the film some of its most best reviews on the syndicated TV show Sneak Previews. Siskel called it "superior musical theater", said that Diana Ross was "superb", "terrific" and came across as "a real star", but he had reservations about the film's "heavy message". Ebert praised other cast members and numerous technical aspects of the film, saying that it was "fun" and in the "great tradition of the American musical". Ebert's print review in The Chicago Sun Times gave the film 3 stars out of a possible 4, describing The Wiz as filled with "great moments and a lot of life, sensational special effects and costumes" and good performances from the main cast apart from Ted Ross, who "sort of disappears into his lion’s costume" and was difficult for viewers to connect with. Despite the overall positive review, Ebert felt the film was less engaging than The Wizard of Oz because some of the songs were too saccharine and "'The Wiz' has just a touch too much calculation" in trying to appeal to a broad audience rather than simply telling the story.

Jackson's performance as the Scarecrow was one of the few universally praised elements, with critics saying he possessed "genuine acting talent" and "provided the only genuinely memorable moments", while Ebert said Jackson "fills the role with humor and warmth". Of the results of the film, Jackson stated, "I don't think it could have been any better, I really don't." In 1980, Jackson stated his time working on The Wiz was "my greatest experience so far... I'll never forget that."

The film received another positive critique for its elaborate set design in the book American Jewish Filmmakers, which noted that it "features some of the most imaginative adaptations of New York locales since the glory days of the Astaire-Rogers films."

In a 2004 review of the film, Christopher Null wrote positively of Ted Ross's and Richard Pryor's performances. However, Null's overall review of the film was critical, and he wrote that, other than the song "Ease On down the Road", "the rest is an acid trip of bad dancing, garish sets, and a Joel Schumacher-scripted mess that runs 135 agonizing minutes."

A 2005 piece by Hank Stuever in The Washington Post described the film as "a rather appreciable delight, even when it's a mess", and felt that the singing—especially Diana Ross's—was "a marvel".

The New York Times analyzed the film within a discussion of the genre of blaxploitation: "As the audience for blaxploitation dwindled, it seemed as if Car Wash and The Wiz might be the last gasp of what had been a steadily expanding black presence in mainstream filmmaking."

The St. Petersburg Times noted, "Of course, it only took one flop like The Wiz (1978) to give Hollywood an excuse to retreat to safer (i.e., whiter) creative ground until John Singleton and Spike Lee came along. Yet, without blaxploitation there might not have been another generation of black filmmakers, no Denzel Washington or Angela Bassett, or they might have taken longer to emerge."

The Boston Globe commented, "The term 'black film' should be struck from the critical vocabulary. To appreciate just how outmoded, deceptive and limiting it is, consider the following, all of which have been described as black films," and included The Wiz in a list of disparate genre films as Shaft (1971), Blacula (1972) and Super Fly (1972).

Despite its lack of critical or commercial success from its original release, The Wiz became a cult classic, especially because it features Michael Jackson in his first starring theatrical film role.

=== The Wiz and the black experience in America ===
Essence, a magazine written for African American women, describes The Wiz as a portrayal of the black experience in America. Sharon Stockard Martin describes the film as having undertones of slavery, and highlights this through various plot points. Martin states that "it is the story of innocence taken by an uncompromising force and deposited in the midst of a strange and beautiful but evil land. Sound familiar?" Martin describes how The Wiz is based on African enslavement and reflects the forced transplantation of individuals from their homes into a new and unfamiliar world. Additionally, Martin identifies the freeing of the Winkies to be a large plot point that contributes to the themes of slavery in The Wiz. The Wicked Witch is seen as an oppressive figure who enslaves the Winkies. This can be representative of the systems and individuals who upheld slavery and segregation.

Martin also analyzes the characters in a perspective that reflects the black experience in America. She describes Dorothy in the Judy Garland version as an "escapist", but contrasts her with Dorothy in The Wiz. For Dorothy in The Wiz, she equates her home with love and "... she never wished to leave it".

Martin views Dorothy's male co-stars as various behavior mechanisms displayed by black men as the result of slavery and racism. Martin describes the Scarecrow as "the result of complete undoing", and compares him to a "slave stripped of his past and made into the American Negro". In other words, he represents the idea that black individuals have been characterized to believe in their own intellectual inadequacy. Martin explains the Tin Man as an individual who "develops a hard exterior to protect soft feelings from the inevitable hurt of a hostile environment". In this perspective, the Tin Man is a man who has been forced to travel through the world with strength and intensity. The Tin Man embodies the idea that black men must be strong to survive, an idea that originated from slavery. Lastly, Martin views the Cowardly Lion as a self-defeating man who is paralyzed by fear and internalized narratives that discourage action.

The show and film were described as a "beloved cultural touchstone for many generations of black people."

== Accolades ==
Award	Category	Nominee(s)	Result	Ref.
Academy Awards	Best Art Direction	Art Direction: Tony Walton and Philip Rosenberg; Set Decoration: Edward Stewart and Robert Drumheller	Nominated	
Academy Awards	Best Cinematography	Oswald Morris	Nominated	
Academy Awards	Best Costume Design	Tony Walton	Nominated	
Academy Awards	Best Adaptation Score	Quincy Jones	Nominated	
NAACP Image Awards	Outstanding Directing in a Motion Picture	Sidney Lumet	Won	
NAACP Image Awards	Outstanding Actor in a Motion Picture	Michael Jackson	Won	
NAACP Image Awards	Outstanding Supporting Actor in a Motion Picture	Nipsey Russell	Won	
NAACP Image Awards	Outstanding Supporting Actress in a Motion Picture	Lena Horne	Won	
Saturn Awards	Best Fantasy Film		Nominated	
Saturn Awards	Best Actress	Diana Ross	Nominated	
Saturn Awards	Best Supporting Actor	Michael Jackson	Nominated	
Saturn Awards	Best Supporting Actress	Mabel King	Nominated	
Saturn Awards	Best Costumes	Tony Walton	Nominated	
Saturn Awards	Best Make-up	Stan Winston	Nominated	
Saturn Awards	Best Special Effects	Albert Whitlock	Nominated	

== See also ==
- Adaptations of The Wizard of Oz
- List of films about witchcraft

== Works cited ==
- Soltani, Rania (June 20, 2024). Unveiling the Dual Effects of the Black Movie Remakes: Afrocentricity in The Wiz 1978 (Thesis).
- Forsgren, La Donna L. (September 2019). "The Wiz Redux; or, Why Queer Black Feminist Spectatorship and Politically Engaged Popular Entertainment Continue to Matter". Theatre Survey. 60 (3): 325–354. doi:10.1017/S0040557419000243. ProQuest 2268521299.
- Glover, Eric M. (2019). "The Wiz (Adapted from the Wonderful Wizard of Oz, by L. Frank Baum) by William F. Brown and Charlie Smalls (review)". Theatre Journal. 71 (1): 116–118. doi:10.1353/tj.2019.0018. JSTOR 27063754. Gale A761686612 Project MUSE 721743 ProQuest 2704060301.
- Martin, Alfred L. Jr. (2021). "Blackbusting Hollywood: Racialized Media Reception, Failure, and The Wiz as Black Blockbuster". JCMS: Journal of Cinema and Media Studies. 60 (2): 56–79. doi:10.1353/cj.2021.0003. Project MUSE 781343.
- Pence, Tim L (August 2021). Designing the Virtual Wiz (Thesis). doi:10.34944/dspace/6788.
- Ward, David; Henderson, Jerrell L. (2022). "The Wiz". Fifty Key Stage Musicals. pp. 146–150. doi:10.4324/978100300972626. ISBN 9781003009726.
