= Ben Harney (actor) =

American actor and dancer (born 1952)

- Born: August 29, 1952 (age 74); Brooklyn, New York, USA
- Education: The High School of Music & Art, 1970
- Occupation: Stage actor
- Years active: 1972–1985
- Spouse: Olive Harney
- Awards: Tony Award for Best Performance by a Leading Actor in a Musical, 1982 (Dreamgirls)

Ben Harney (born 29 August 1952 in Brooklyn, New York) is an American actor and dancer who was most active in his career between 1972 and 1985.

Harney attended Manhattan's High School of Music & Art, graduating in 1970.

Harney won the 1982 Tony Award for Best Performance by a Leading Actor in a Musical for his role as the Berry Gordy-esque character, Curtis Taylor Jr. in the Broadway musical Dreamgirls.

He also created, co-wrote and performed in the 1990 children's Christian video series Ben & Eddie with Muppet performer Camille Bonora.
