= Mabel King =

American actress and singer (1932–1999)

- Born: Donnie Mabel Elizabeth Washington; December 25, 1932; Charleston, South Carolina, U.S.
- Died: November 9, 1999 (aged 66); Los Angeles, California, U.S.
- Occupations: Actress; singer
- Years active: 1964–1990
- Known for: Mabel "Mama" Thomas – What's Happening!! Evillene – The Wiz
- Spouse: Melvin King (m. 1967; div. 1989)
- Children: 1

Mabel King (née Donnie Mabel Elizabeth Washington; December 25, 1932 – November 9, 1999) was an American actress and singer. She was known for her role as Mabel "Mama" Thomas on the ABC sitcom What's Happening!! from its premiere in 1976 until the end of its second season in 1978. King was also known for portraying Evillene the Witch, a role she originated in the stage musical The Wiz and reprised in Sidney Lumet's 1978 film adaptation. She recorded on the Rama Records and Amy Records labels.

== Early life ==
King was born Donnie Mabel Elizabeth Washington in Charleston, South Carolina, the daughter of Rosalie Washington and Joseph Washington on Christmas Day 1932. She was raised in Harlem, New York where she eventually became a gospel and nightclub singer.

== Career ==
=== Stage work ===
She did not start acting until her mid-thirties, in 1966, when she played the role of Maria in the national touring play of Porgy and Bess. The following year she played the role of Ernestina in the Broadway musical/comedy Hello, Dolly! Then in 1972, she acted in the musical film Don't Play Us Cheap, which went unreleased until the following year, after it had been performed on Broadway as a stage play. That same year, she played the Queen of Myrthia in the horror film Ganja & Hess. In January 1975, she played the role of Evillene, the Wicked Witch of the West in the all-African-American cast of the Broadway musical The Wiz. The role earned her a Drama Desk Award nomination for outstanding featured actress in a musical. Her performance in The Wiz brought her much attention and soon after she received roles in the films The Bingo Long Traveling All-Stars & Motor Kings, with Billy Dee Williams and James Earl Jones, and Scott Joplin, with Billy Dee Williams and Clifton Davis. In June 1980, King returned to stage work, starring in the Broadway musical It's So Nice to Be Civilized. However, the show did poorly and closed after eight performances.

=== Television and film ===
In 1976, she was offered the role of Mabel Thomas on the sitcom What's Happening!!. Her character often used the catch phrase "This is true", which she said to her children when she tried to prove a point to them. King played the role from 1976 to 1978, but due to disagreements with the direction the creators wanted to take the series, she left What's Happening!! in 1978 after two seasons. That same year, she reprised the role of Evillene for the 1978 film version of The Wiz. It was the second time in her career that she appeared in a movie after being in the stage version, the first being Don't Play Us Cheap. The following year, she appeared in the film The Jerk as the mother to Steve Martin's character. King received mostly guest spots on television series including Fantasy Island, The Jeffersons, Amazing Stories and Tales from the Darkside. In between, she signed on with then Hollywood agent Ruben Malaret, who negotiated her reprised role of Mama Johnson in the made-for-TV movie The Jerk, Too (1984). Her last two movie roles were Scrooged (1988) starring Bill Murray and Dead Men Don't Die (1990) starring Elliott Gould.

== Personal life ==
King was married to Melvin King from June 1967 until September 1989. She and Larry Banks had one child, a son named Larry Jr., who died in 1996.

== Later years and death ==
Mabel King died on November 9, 1999, at age 66.

== Filmography ==
Year	Title	Role	Notes
1973	Don't Play Us Cheap	Sister Bowser	
1973	Ganja & Hess	Queen of Myrthia	
1976	The Bingo Long Traveling All-Stars & Motor Kings	Bertha Dewitt	
1976–1978	What's Happening!!	Mabel "Mama" Thomas	37 episodes
1977	Scott Joplin	Madam Amy	
1978	The Wiz	Evillene	Nominated—Saturn Award for Best Supporting Actress
1978–1981	Fantasy Island	Various roles	3 episodes
1979	Barney Miller	Mother Zilla	Episode: "Computer Crime"
1979	The Jerk	Mother	
1980	The Gong Show Movie	Mabel	
1981	Palmerstown, U.S.A.	Aunt Toog	Episode: "Future City"
1981	Getting Over	Mabel Queen	
1983	ABC Weekend Special	Mrs. Trussker	Episode: "All the Money in the World"
1983	Lottery!	Mabel	Episode: "Los Angeles: Bigger Volume"
1983	Whiz Kids		Episode: "Fatal Error"
1984	The Jerk, Too	Mama Johnson	Television movie
1984	The Master	Willie	Episode: "Fat Tuesday"
1984	The Jeffersons	Mother Tobin	Episode: "Some Enchanted Evening"
1986	Amazing Stories	Jennifer Mowbray	Episode: "The Sitter"
1986	The Colbys	Fortune Teller	Episode: "The Honeymoon"
1986	Tales from the Darkside	Ruby Cuzzins	Episode: "Baker's Dozen"
1988	Black Vampire		
1988	Wiseguy	Mae Nina	Episode: "Blood Dance"
1988	Scrooged	Gramma	
1990	Dead Men Don't Die	Chafuka	

== Recordings ==
- "Alabama Rock'n'Roll" (RAMA Records, 1956)
- "Mabel King With The Royal Sita Chorus – Symbol Of Love / Second Hand Love" (RAMA Records, 1956)
- "Go Back Home Young Fella/Lefty" (Amy Records, 1962)
- "When We Get The Word / Love" (Amy Records, 1962)
