= William F. Brown (writer) =

American playwright (1928–2019)

- Born: William Ferdinand Brown; April 16, 1928
- Died: June 23, 2019 (aged 91)
- Occupation: Playwright
- Spouse: Tina Tippit
- Children: 2
- Writing career
- Notable works: The Wiz (1974); A Broadway Musical

William Ferdinand Brown (April 16, 1928 – June 23, 2019) was an American playwright, best known for writing the book of the musical, The Wiz (1974), which is an adaptation of L. Frank Baum's The Wonderful Wizard of Oz with music and lyrics by Charlie Smalls, for which Brown received a nomination for the Tony Award for Best Book of a Musical.

== Biography ==
His other works include The Girl in the Freudian Slip (1967) based on his 1959 novel, which played on Broadway for three days in May after a tour; How to Steal an Election (1968), A Single Thing in Common (1978), and A Broadway Musical with Lee Adams and Charles Strouse, which had only one non-preview performance on December 21, 1978. Other plays include Damon's Song, Twist, The Nutley Papers, and numerous revues. His work for television includes episodes of That Was The Week That Was, Love American Style, As the World Turns, and Jackie Gleason's American Scene Magazine. He was also a cartoonist who wrote and drew the syndicated comic strip Boomer.

Although The Wiz and A Broadway Musical are written for black casts using black street slang, Brown himself was white. He was married to writer Tina Tippit and had two children.

== Works ==
=== The Girl in the Freudian Slip ===
The Girl in the Freudian Slip was first copyrighted in 1964 under the title Linda Stone Is Brutal, which is the title of a play written by the main character, psychiatrist Dr. Dewey Maugham, who was played by Alan Young when the play was performed at the Booth Theatre in 1967. The play is narrated by Leslie Maugham, Dewey's 17-year-old daughter, an only child who appears to be more mature than her parents. She discovers the play while cleaning Dewey's desk and reads it, then sends it to family friend, Dr. Alec Rice, a womanizing psychiatrist who is a family friend, who passes it along to the agent who got his book published, Barbara Leonard. Barbara is patient Dewey had two years earlier and about whom he wrote the play, much to the chagrin of his wife, Pat, who still has not read the play. Complications come about when Barbara visits Dewey in his home while his family is out, and all return in time to catch Barbara with her blouse off and in Dewey's hands. We see only one of Dewey's patients, a young man named Wellman, who is unlucky in love, until he realizes in the play's finale that the girl he spotted and has been trying to find ever since is actually Leslie.

=== How to Steal an Election ===
How to Steal an Election was first performed off-Broadway at the Pocket Theatre in October 1968. The young leads were Carole Demas and Clifton Davis.

=== The Wiz ===
Brown was commissioned by producer Ken Harper to adapt L. Frank Baum's novel The Wonderful Wizard of Oz into African American street slang. Incorporating the music of Charlie Smalls, The Wiz opened on Broadway in January 1975, with the starring performers Stephanie Mills and André De Shields directed by Geoffrey Holder. The play was highly successful, running for over 1,600 performances and winning seven Tony Awards, and was later adapted as a 1978 film starring Diana Ross and Michael Jackson.

=== A Single Thing in Common ===
A Single Thing in Common is set in an apartment known as "the playpen" by swinging seventies types Richard Sloan, Linda Schneider, and Mike Jarvis. When Mike, a pilot, gets hired to work in Abu Dhabi, the others look for a roommate who will find their lifestyle acceptable. Soon, Richard's old friend George Caulfield shows up at the door. His wife, Joyce, has had an affair and granted him a divorce. He asks to stay until he can find somewhere else. Richard leaves with George still there, and when Linda finds him, she attacks him with a judo move, causing him to have amnesia. Although his amnesia doesn't last long once he looks through his wallet, he feigns amnesia and allows Linda, who has agreed to allow him to room there when she finds out how much money he will make in the divorce, to make him into a new person. Eventually Joyce comes back and causes him to unravel the entire plot, but for this romantic comedy, he and Linda have fallen in love and he decides he doesn't want Joyce back, even though she wants him. The published play makes no indication that it was ever performed professionally.

=== A Broadway Musical ===
A Broadway Musical deals with a sleazy white theatre producer's attempt to adapt an African American writer's serious play for a commercial stage musical. The show was inspired by Lee Adams and Charles Strouse's real-life experiences with their 1964 Broadway production of Golden Boy. The show closed after 14 previews and one performance.

== Published books ==
- Tiger, Tiger! Princeton in Caricature, Coward-McCann, (1950)
- Beat Beat Beat (1959)
- The Girl in the Freudian Slip (1959)
- The Abominable Showmen (1960)
- The World Is My Yo-Yo (1963)
