= Tiger Haynes =

American actor and musician (1914-1994)

- Born: George Haynes; December 13, 1914; Frederiksted, St. Croix
- Died: February 14, 1994 (aged 79); New York City, New York
- Occupation: Actor

George "Tiger" Haynes (December 13, 1914 – February 14, 1994), sometimes billed as Colonel Tiger Haynes, was an American actor of musical theatre, television and film and jazz musician.

He was born in Frederiksted, St. Croix, and moved to New York when he was a boy. An ex-boxer, Haynes played guitar with The Three Flames from 1945 to 1956, a group which had its own NBC radio show in the mid-1940s and a television show on NBC television in 1949, and which incorporated Sammy Benskin in 1954.

He made his mainstream Broadway debut in Leonard Sillman's musical revue New Faces of 1956. He is best known for his portrayal of the Tin Man in the original Broadway cast of The Wiz (a role assumed by Nipsey Russell in the 1978 film adaptation). He also made several television appearances on programs such as The Cosby Show (1989), In the Heat of the Night (1989), and Law & Order (1994), as well as numerous minor film appearances in films such as All That Jazz (1979) and Ratboy (1986).

== Musicals ==
- New Faces of 1956
- Fade Out-Fade In
- The Wiz
- Louis (1981)

== Films ==
| Year | Title | Role | Notes |
|---|---|---|---|
| 1979 | All That Jazz | Porter | |
| 1980 | Times Square | Andy | |
| 1984 | Moscow on the Hudson | Lionel's Grandfather | |
| 1984 | Nothing Lasts Forever | Mr. Brown | |
| 1986 | Ratboy | Derelict Ralph | |
| 1986 | The Mosquito Coast | Mr. Semper | |
| 1987 | Enemy Territory | Barton | |
| 1988 | Apprentice to Murder | Rufus | |
| 1989 | Dead Bang | Edwin Gates | |
| 1990 | Awakenings | Janitor | |
| 1991 | Jungle Fever | | |
