= Ted Ross =

American actor (1934–2002)

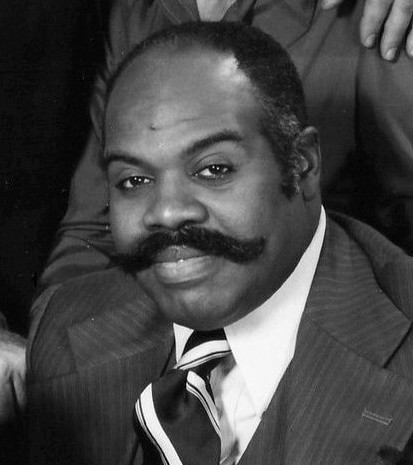
- Ross in 1976
- Born: Theodore Ross Roberts; June 30, 1934; Zanesville, Ohio, U.S.
- Died: September 3, 2002 (aged 68); Dayton, Ohio, U.S.
- Occupation: Actor
- Years active: 1968–1991

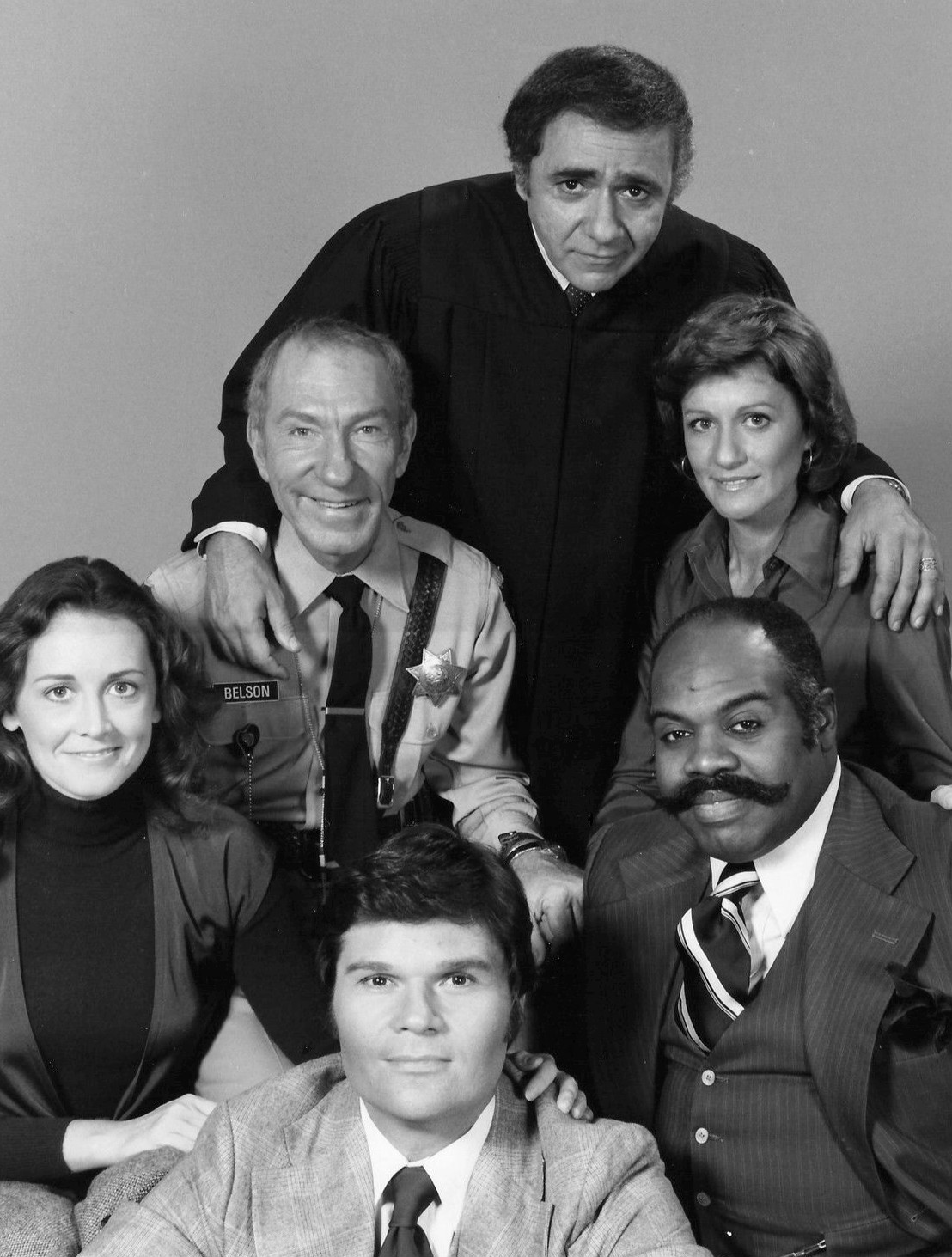
Ross in the cast of Sirota's Court.

Theodore Ross Roberts (June 30, 1934 – September 3, 2002) was an American actor best known for his role as the Lion in The Wiz, an all-African American reinterpretation of The Wizard of Oz. He won a Tony Award for the original 1975 Broadway production and recreated the role in the 1978 film version which also starred Diana Ross (no relation), Michael Jackson, Richard Pryor, Nipsey Russell, and Lena Horne. Ross appeared in many films including the role of Bitterman in Arthur and on the television sitcoms Benson, The Jeffersons, What's Happening Now!!, The Cosby Show and its spin-off A Different World. His final role was in the 1991 movie The Fisher King.

== Biography ==
Ross was born in Zanesville, Ohio, but his mother, Elizabeth Russell, a nightclub singer in the 1920s and 1930s, moved the family to Dayton when young Ross was seven. He loved the clubs on West Fifth Street—Dayton's answer to Harlem in the first half of the 20th century. While in junior high, Ross, who was big for his age, would dress up and strut into the Owl Club and The Palace Theatre's Midnight Rambles to see great acts such as Duke Ellington.

His nightclub exploits as a teenager were not very popular at home. He dropped out of Roosevelt High in 1950 and enlisted in the United States Air Force. Two years later at age eighteen, Ross entered an amateur night contest at the Top Hat bar on Germantown Street. Home on furlough, he sang a cover of Judy Garland's "Over the Rainbow", won $5 that night and found his calling. After leaving the military, Ross worked his way from Great Falls, Montana, to a strip bar in Los Angeles as a singer and MC. There he landed his first stage role in Oscar Brown Jr.'s "Bigtime Buck White".

The musical began as a workshop in Watts and moved to New York City in 1968. He starred in The Wiz and other Broadway productions, such as Purlie, Ain't Misbehavin, and Raisin in the Sun. His first film was The Bingo Long Traveling All-Stars & Motor Kings, a baseball movie starring James Earl Jones and Richard Pryor. Films that followed included Ragtime, Amityville II, Police Academy, Stealing Home, and The Fisher King. One of the roles he is most fondly remembered for is that of Bitterman, Arthur Bach's long suffering chauffeur in the 1981 Dudley Moore hit, Arthur. Ross was a swinger. According to Rialto Report interview with adult actor Michael Lawrence, Ross "...was a big swinger and used to throw a lot of orgies at his house."

In 1990, Ross played Troy Maxson in a Cincinnati production of August Wilson's Fences. It was the first time his family saw him perform on stage since the contest in 1952. He came home to Dayton, Ohio for good in 1997 and opened Your Place, a jazz club on West Third Street. Occasionally, Ross sat in and sang in his club, and performed as part of the Dayton Art Institute's Just Jazz series.

== Death and honours ==
Ross was honoured by Dayton's Wayman Chapel AME Church, the Miami Valley Fisk University Alumni Club and by WROU-FM as a Black History Month Achiever. He suffered a stroke in 1998, and died from complications four years later at Good Samaritan Hospital on September 3, 2002, aged 68.

== Broadway and stage ==
- Buck White (1969)
- Purlie (1970) (1972)
- Raisin (1973)
- The Wiz (1975)

== Filmography ==
Year	Title	Role	Notes
1976	The Bingo Long Traveling All-Stars & Motor Kings	Sallison 'Sallie' Potter, Owner of Ebony Aces	
1977	Minstrel Man	Charlie Bates, Minstrel Singer	
1978	The Wiz	Lion / Fleetwood Coupe de Ville	
1981	Arthur	Bitterman	
1981	Ragtime	Black Lawyer	
1982	Fighting Back	Commissioner	
1982	Amityville II: The Possession	Mr. Booth, the Lawyer	
1984	Police Academy	Captain Reed	
1986	The Equalizer	Pike	Episode: "Tip on a Sure Thing"
1988	Arthur 2: On the Rocks	Bitterman	
1988	Stealing Home	Bud Scott	
1991	The Fisher King	Limo Bum	(final film role)
