= Charlie Smalls =

American composer

- Smalls on "The Monkees", 1968
- Born: 25 October 1943; Queens, New York
- Died: 27 August 1987 (aged 43); Belgium
- Occupations: Composer, songwriter,
- Awards: Drama Desk Award for Outstanding Music and Lyrics; 1974: The Wiz; Best Original Score; 1975: The Wiz; Best Cast Show Album; 1976: The Wiz

Charlie Smalls (October 25, 1943 – August 27, 1987) was an American composer and songwriter, best known for writing the music and lyrics for playwright William F. Brown's 1975 Broadway musical The Wiz and the 1978 film version of the same name.

== Career ==
A musical prodigy, Smalls attended the Juilliard School at age 11 in 1954, staying until 1961. He wrote the song "From Me to You" for Hugh Masekela's 1966 album Hugh Masekela's Next Album and a song for John Cassavetes's 1968 film Faces called "Never Felt Like This Before."

Smalls appeared in the tag scene of the "Some Like It Lukewarm" episode of The Monkees, which aired on March 4, 1968, chatting at a piano with singer Davy Jones.

After graduating from the High School of Performing Arts, Smalls toured as a member of the New York Jazz Repertory Company before beginning work on The Wiz. An African-American urbanized retelling of L. Frank Baum's The Wonderful Wizard of Oz, The Wiz was adapted into a feature film in 1978. Smalls also wrote the score for the 1976 film Drum.

== Death ==
Smalls was in Belgium accompanying the tour of professional jazz dance instructor Sue Samuels, to whom he was engaged to be married, when he died at the age of 43 during emergency surgery to repair a burst appendix.

At the time of his death, Smalls was working on a new musical, Miracles, a musical adaptation of The Man Who Could Work Miracles by H.G. Wells. He had recorded some songs with Geoffrey Holder and the Harlem Boys Choir.

In 1989, Smalls's score for The Wiz was donated to the Schomburg Center for Research in Black Culture by Mildred Harper, the mother of producer and creator of The Wiz, Ken Harper, along with Harper's papers.

== Honors ==
Smalls won the 1975 Tony Award for Best Score as well as the 1976 Grammy Award for Best Musical Theater Album for his work on The Wiz.
