= Jimmy Hopps =

American jazz drummer (born 1939)

James Edward Hopps Jr. (born 1939) is an American jazz drummer. Although he never recorded as a leader, he worked extensively with Roland Kirk, Charles Tolliver, Stanley Cowell, and Pharoah Sanders during some of their well known sessions. He also worked with Sahib Shihab, Joe Bonner, Cecil McBee, Marion Brown, Shirley Scott, Jan Garbarek, and Arild Andersen.

Kazumi Watanabe's Mudari - Spirit Of Song features Hopps as a co-leader.

Hopps retired from jazz in the late 1970s. In 1978, he legally changed his name to Jimmi EsSpirit.

He made a brief return on A Song for the Sun, by the Sun Ra Arkestra directed by Marshall Allen, under the name Jimmi EsSpirit.

== Discography ==
=== As sideman ===
With Stanley Cowell

- Blues for the Viet Cong (Polydor, 1969)
- Illusion Suite (ECM, 1973)
- Handscapes 2 with The Piano Choir (Strata-East, 1975)

With Roland Kirk

- The Inflated Tear (Atlantic, 1968)
- Left & Right (Atlantic, 1969)
- Roland Kirk (Atlantic, 1969)
- Volunteered Slavery (Atlantic, 1969)

With Charles Tolliver

- The Ringer (Polydor, 1969)
- Music Inc. (Strata-East, 1971)
- Live at Slugs' (Strata-East, 1972)

With others

- Joe Bonner, Angel Eyes (Muse, 1976)
- Marion Brown, Vista (ABC Impulse!, 1975)
- Wild Bill Davis, Free, Frantic and Funky (RCA Victor, 1965)
- Wild Bill Davis, Up Top (RCA Victor, 1979)
- Fumio Karashima, Piranha (Whynot/Trio, 1976)
- Webster Lewis, Live at Club 7 (Sonet, 1972)
- Cecil McBee, Mutima (Strata-East, 1974)
- Pharoah Sanders, Village of the Pharoahs (ABC Impulse!, 1973)
- Pharoah Sanders, Elevation (Impulse!, 1974)
- Shirley Scott, One for Me (Strata-East, 1974)
- Sahib Shihab, Sentiments (Storyville, 1972)
- Harold Vick, Don't Look Back (Strata-East, 1974)
