= Mtume =

American funk and soul group

- Origin: New York City, United States
- Genres: R&B, funk, jazz-funk, post-disco
- Years active: 1973–1995
- Labels: Third Street (1973–1977); Epic (1978–1995)
- Past members: Hubert Eaves III; Reggie Lucas; Basil Fearrington; Howard King; James Mtume; Tawatha Agee; Philip Field; Ed "Tree" Moore; Leslie Ming; Raymond Jackson

Mtume (pronounced em-tu-may) was an American funk and soul group that rose to prominence during the early 1980s and had several R&B hits during its career. Its founder, former percussionist James Mtume, previously played and toured with Miles Davis in the early 1970s. Other members of the group included Reggie Lucas, Philip Field, and vocalist Tawatha Agee. Mtume also gained recognition after having its hit single "Juicy Fruit" extensively sampled by many hip-hop artists, most notably by the Notorious B.I.G. in the 1994 hit song "Juicy".

== History ==
During the start of the group's career, they recorded three albums, their first for Strata-East Records (1972) titled Alkebu-Lan- The Land of the Blacks, and two for the independent label Third Street Records: Kawaida (1973); Alkebu-Lan (1975); and Rebirth Cycle (1977). However, not finding pop or R&B chart success, they signed to major label Epic Records in 1978, releasing the albums Kiss This World Goodbye (1978), and In Search of the Rainbow Seekers (1980), which found modest success on the R&B chart. Their 1983 album Juicy Fruit, however, provided Mtume with its biggest hit, when the title song reached number one for eight weeks on the U.S. R&B chart, and was certified gold by the RIAA, despite being just shy of the top 40 on the Billboard Hot 100 at 45.

Mtume's 1984 album You, Me, and He also proved to be a success with the title song reaching number 2 on the R&B chart. Their final R&B top ten hit was "Breathless" (1986) from their final album Theater of the Mind. Mtume continued recording with Epic Records until the late 1980s. Group member Tawatha Agee subsequently went solo in 1987.

== Other success ==
Concurrent with his time in Mtume, James Mtume wrote several songs for an assortment of artists, often with Mtume bandmate Reggie Lucas, such as Stephanie Mills' Top-ten single "Never Knew Love Like This Before" (for which they both received a Grammy Award for Best R&B Song Writing and Producing) and the Roberta Flack/Donny Hathaway hit singles "The Closer I Get to You" and "Back Together Again".

Following Mtume's disbandment, James Mtume resumed his already prolific production and songwriting career, which has included writing "Freak Tonight" by R. Kelly from the A Thin Line Between Love and Hate Soundtrack, and co-producing Mary J. Blige's album, Share My World. He also produced Roy Ayers, and the Bar-Kays, and composed the music and theme tune for the 1990s television police drama New York Undercover.

Reggie Lucas (along with Jellybean Benitez) produced the majority of Madonna's first album, Madonna, including the songs 'Borderline' and 'Lucky Star'.

Tawatha Agee later became a background singer. She sang on Steely Dan's 2003 album Everything Must Go, Empire of the Sun's 2013 album Ice on the Dune and Lenny Kravitz's 2014 album Strut.

Philip Field continued to produce and write for many artists including Gwen Guthrie, Tawatha Agee, Tyrone Brunson, the Bar-Kays, Charles Earland and others. He co-wrote and co-produced on Roy Ayers' album You Might Be Surprised and co-wrote "How Many Ways" from Toni Braxton's debut album.

== Members ==
Former members

- James Mtume – vocals, percussion, keyboards (1978–1995; died 2022)
- Hubert Eaves III – keyboards (1978–1980)
- Tawatha Agee – vocals (1978–1986)
- Reggie Lucas – guitars (1978–1980; (died 2018)
- Basil Fearrington – bass (1978–1980)
- Howard King – drums (1978–1980)
- Philip Field – keyboards, synthesizer, synthesizer programming, vocals (1982–1995)
- Ed "Tree" Moore – guitars (1982–1986)
- Raymond Jackson – bass (1982–1986; died 2026)
- Leslie Ming – drums (1982–1995)

== Discography ==
=== Studio albums ===
Year	Album	Peak chart positions			Certifications	Record Label
Year	Album	US	US R&B	UK	Certifications	Record Label
1978	Kiss This World Goodbye	—	—	—		Epic
1980	In Search of the Rainbow Seekers	119	30	—		Epic
1983	Juicy Fruit	26	3	—	RIAA: Gold	Epic
1984	You, Me and He	77	5	85		Epic
1986	Theater of the Mind	135	23	—		Epic
"—" denotes a recording that did not chart.

=== Compilation albums ===
- The Best of Mtume & Lucas with Reggie Lucas (Expansion, 2004)
- Juicy (Sony BMG, 2005)
- Prime Time: The Epic Anthology (SoulMusic, 2017)

=== Singles ===
Year	Single	Peak chart positions				Certifications	Album
Year	Single	US	US R&B	US Dan	UK	Certifications	Album
1978	"Just Funnin'"	—	93	—	—		Kiss This World Goodbye
1978	"Funky Constellation"	—	—	—	—		Kiss This World Goodbye
1980	"Give It on Up (If You Want To)"	—	26	30	—		In Search of the Rainbow Seekers
1980	"So You Wanna Be a Star"	—	60	52	—		In Search of the Rainbow Seekers
1983	"Juicy Fruit"	45	1	30	34	RIAA: Gold	Juicy Fruit
1983	"Would You Like To (Fool Around)"	—	11	—	—		Juicy Fruit
1983	"Green Light"	—	66	—	—		Juicy Fruit
1984	"You, Me and He"	83	2	—	—		You, Me and He
1984	"Prime Time"	—	—	—	57		You, Me and He
1984	"C.O.D. (I'll Deliver)"	—	20	—	—		You, Me and He
1984	"I Simply Like"	—	—	—	—		You, Me and He
1986	"Breathless"	—	9	—	—		Theater of the Mind
1986	"P.O.P. (Pursuits of Pleasure) Generation"	—	39	—	—		Theater of the Mind
1986	"Body & Soul (Take Me)"	—	71	—	—		Theater of the Mind
"—" denotes a recording that did not chart.
