= Juicy Fruit (album) =

Studio album by Mtume
- Released: May 15, 1983
- Recorded: 1982–1983
- Studio: E.A.R.S. Recording Studios, New Jersey
- Genre: R&B; boogie
- Label: Epic
- Producer: James Mtume

Mtume chronology
In Search of the Rainbow Seekers (1980)	Juicy Fruit (1983)	You, Me and He (1984)

Professional ratings
Review scores
Source	Rating
Allmusic	4.5/5 stars
Robert Christgau	B

Juicy Fruit is a 1983 album by R&B group Mtume. It contains their No. 1 R&B hit, "Juicy Fruit". It was their third album for Epic Records.

== Track listing ==
1. "Green Light" (Dean Cannon, James Mtume, Philip Field)
2. "Juicy Fruit" (Mtume)
3. "Hips" (Dean Cannon, Philip Field)
4. "Would You Like To (Fool Around)" (Mtume, Reggie Lucas)
5. "Your Love's Too Good (To Spread Around)" (Leon "Ndugu" Chancler, Norman Dozier, Reggie Andrews)
6. "Hip Dip Skippedabeat" (Darlene Davis, David Foreman, Mtume)
7. "Ready for Your Love" (Ronald Sirois, Philip Field)
8. "The After 6 Mix (Juicy Fruit Part II)" (Mtume)

== Personnel ==
Mtume

- James Mtume – keyboards, lead vocals, backing vocals
- Tawatha Agee – lead vocals, backing vocals, percussion
- Ed "Tree" Moore, Kevin Robinson, Michael Murphy – guitar
- Raymond Jackson – bass, backing vocals
- Philip Field – keyboards, synthesizers, synth programming, backing vocals
- Barry Eastman, Bernie Worrell, David Frank – keyboards
- Gary Bartz – saxophone

Technical

- Andy Wallace – engineer
- Steve Kahn – engineer

== Charts ==
Chart (1983)	Peak position
Billboard Top LPs & Tape	26
Top R&B Albums	3

=== Singles ===
Year	Single	Chart positions			
Year	Single	US	US R&B	US Dance	UK Singles Chart
1983	"Juicy Fruit"	45	1	30	34
1983	"Would You Like To (Fool Around)"	—	11	—	—
1984	"Green Light"	—	66	—	—

== "Juicy Fruit" ==
The song "Juicy Fruit" is a staple hip-hop sample. It is sampled in the following songs:

- "Juicy" by Wrecks-N-Effect
- "Juicy" by Next
- "Talkin' All That Jazz" by Stetsasonic
- "Do You See" by Warren G
- "This D.J." by Warren G
- "Loving You" by Jennifer Lopez
- "Faithfully" by Faith Evans
- "Juicy" by The Notorious B.I.G.
- "Let It Go" by Keyshia Cole
- "I Don't Care (Juiciest)"/"How Come You Don't Call Me Part 2" by Alicia Keys
- "The Ave" By Dre Dog
- "Game's Pain" Mega Remix by The Game Featuring Fat Joe, Jadakiss, Keyshia Cole, Queen Latifah, Bun B, Pusha T, and Young Buck
- "Dreaming Casually" by Rocky Padilla
- "East Side Love Story" by Johnny Boy
- "You Make It Easy" By Sharissa (Unreleased)
- "On the Blvd." by Lil Puppet
- "Joystick" by 213, and Snoop Dogg
- "Supastar" by Montell Jordan
- "No Soul" by Say Anything
- "No Question" by Allure ft. LL Cool J
- "Freak Tonight" by R. Kelly
- "The One" by Tamar Braxton
- "Leather and Wood" by AMG
- "Flashbacks" by The Warlocks
- "Your Love (Urban Noize Remix)" by Nicki Minaj
