= Paper Man =

Paper Man may refer to:

== Films ==
- The Paper Man (1963 film), a Mexican drama film
- Paper Man (1971 film), an American television film
- Paper Man (2009 film), an American independent comedy-drama film
- Paperman, a 2012 Disney animated short film
- The Paper Man (2020 film), a Canadian documentary film

== Other uses ==
- Paper Man (album), a 1968 album led by American jazz trumpeter Charles Tolliver
- The Paper Man, a 2008 album by Viper
- The Paper Man (miniseries), a 1990 Australian miniseries
