= Live in Tokyo (Charles Tolliver album) =

Live album by Charles Tolliver

Live album by Charles Tolliver / Music Inc.
- Released: c. 1974/1975 (Note: The publication year printed on the original LP record label is 1974 and the catalog number is SES-19745. The album itself appeared in Billboard magazine's listing of "New LP/Tape Releases" for the week of February 8, 1975.)
- Recorded: December 7, 1973
- Venue: Yubinchokin Hall (Tokyo)
- Genres: Post-bop; hard bop
- Length: 49:53
- Label: Strata-East
- Producer: Charles Tolliver

Charles Tolliver chronology
Live at the Loosdrecht Jazz Festival (1973)	Live in Tokyo (1974)	Impact (1975)

Alternate cover
- Japanese release by Trio Records

Live in Tokyo is a live album by the American jazz trumpeter-composer Charles Tolliver and his quartet Music Inc. Their fifth album overall, it was recorded on December 7, 1973, at Yubinchokin Hall in Tokyo during Tolliver and Music Inc.'s first tour of Japan. The quartet – featuring the pianist Stanley Cowell, the bassist Clint Houston, and Clifford Barbaro on drums – played the show in mostly fast tempo and performed three of Tolliver's original compositions, along with a ballad composed by Cowell and the Thelonious Monk standard "'Round Midnight".

Produced by Tolliver, Live in Tokyo was released about a year after the concert on LP by Strata-East Records, his independent record label. It was later reissued on CD and compiled by the Mosaic label for a three-disc box set of Music Inc.'s live recordings from that same period, titled Mosaic Select. Critics have received the Tokyo disc favorably, giving praise to the quartet's passionate post-bop and hard bop performances. Their innovative interpretation of the Monk piece was highlighted in particular, although some reviewers questioned the sound quality throughout the recordings.

== Background ==
In the early 1970s, the jazz scene was dominated by the twin movements of fusion and avant-garde jazz. Meanwhile, more modernist performers of the previous decade's post-bop development, such as the saxophonist Jackie McLean and the pianist Andrew Hill, experienced career declines. Charles Tolliver, who had played as a side musician for both, was now leading both an experimental big band and a quartet (formed in May 1969 and billed as Music Inc.) to explore a creative middle ground between the avant-garde and the more traditional hard bop style. Helping raise his stature among hard bop peers, Tolliver's trumpet style employed a variety of techniques and musical ideas while based in a tradition of melodic, swing-rhythmed playing associated with predecessors such as Fats Navarro, Clifford Brown, Lee Morgan, and Donald Byrd. Tolliver was also among a wave of noncommercial jazz musicians influenced by the spirit of the period's Black Power movement and the music of John Coltrane, employing the saxophonist's consistently strong dynamic of delivery and turbulent harmonies into his own harmonic jazz improvisations. (Note: In the liner notes to the 1998 CD reissue of Live in Tokyo, Tolliver wrote: "One of the reasons the music of that era sounds the way it does is because there was at that time a oneness of purpose among black people in general and musicians in particular. The whole push toward equality, along with John Coltrane's music, permeated everything we did for about five to eight years.")

In 1971, Tolliver founded Strata-East Records, a New York-based independent record label, with his quartet's pianist Stanley Cowell in an effort to showcase their recordings and those of his contemporaries. He had become close friends with Cowell while performing together in the late 1960s as part of the drummer-composer Max Roach's quartet, a tenure which had gained Tolliver renown as one of the most innovative trumpeters in jazz. With Strata-East, Tolliver and Cowell became the first two young African-American musicians to head a jazz label, while releasing recordings by leading avant-gardists like Clifford Jordan and Pharoah Sanders (Coltrane's former sideman). In late 1973, having released four albums together, Tolliver and Music Inc. embarked on their first tour of Japan, where Live in Tokyo would be recorded.

== Recording and performance ==
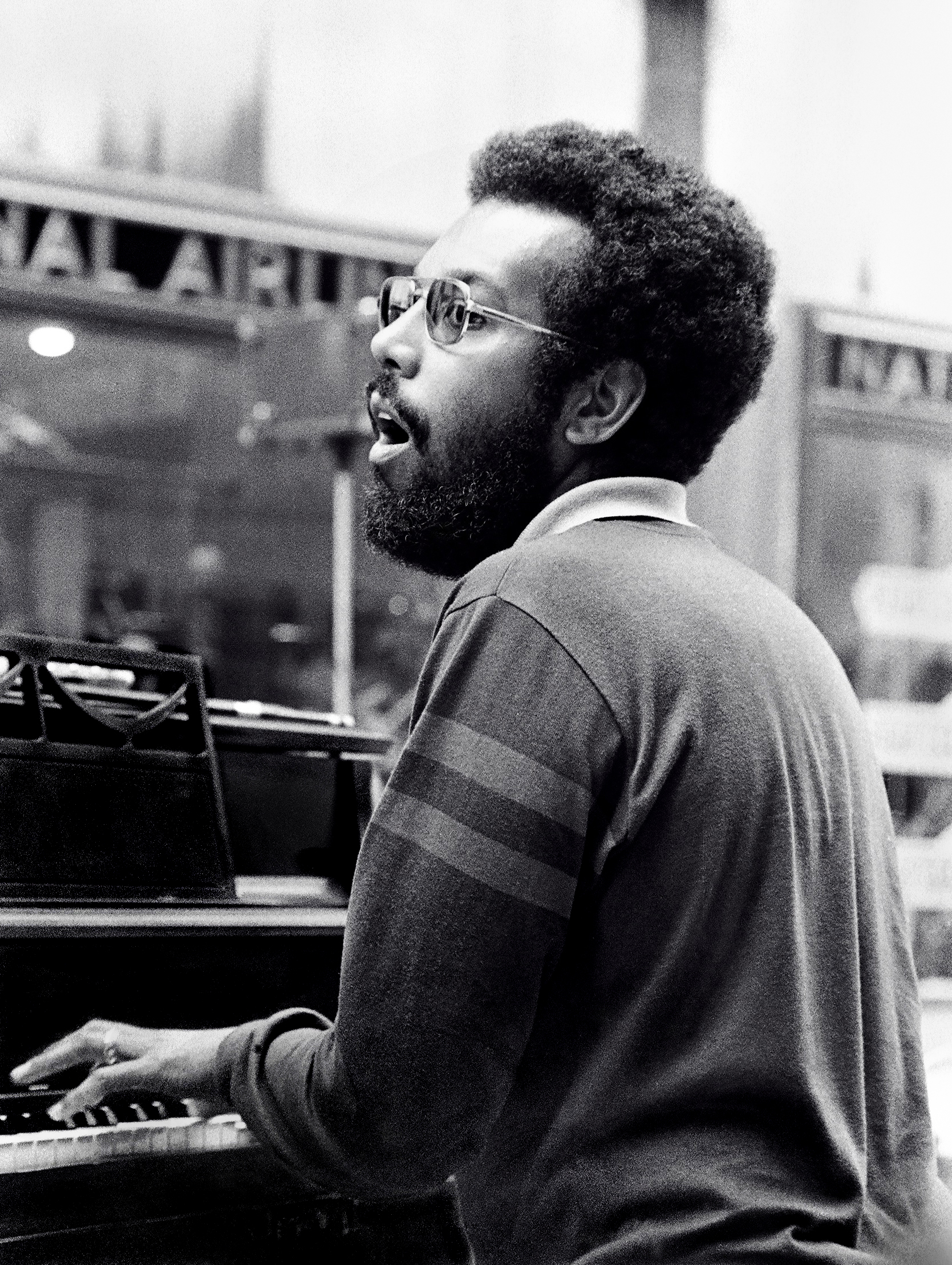
Stanley Cowell, Music Inc.'s pianist and Strata-East co-founder, in 1977

The recording took place at Yubinchokin Hall in Tokyo on December 7, 1973, the last date of the tour. According to the album's liner notes, it was recorded "in association" with Takafumi Ohkuma and Kuniya Inaoka from the Japanese jazz label Trio Records. In concert, Tolliver led the quartet, featuring Cowell on piano, Clint Houston on bass, and Clifford Barbaro on drums.

"Effi"
A 30-second sample, with improvised variations by Tolliver and Cowell

A largely uptempo performance, the show opened in this very vein with two Tolliver-penned compositions, "Drought" and "Stretch". The former featured an extended and sharp-toned solo by Tolliver, while the latter began with roughly five minutes of Houston soloing that led Music Inc. into a relaxed, dark-toned blues accompanied by Cowell's block chords. The quartet transformed and concluded "Stretch" with a purely swing-rhythmed performance. The midtempo Cowell-composed ballad "Effi" began in a waltz time signature and proceeded to different sections, during which the musicians employed complex fills and gradual variations that allowed them to explore modes from the blues, Latin, and Eastern music.

While "Effi" was intended to end the concert, Music Inc. performed a cover of Thelonious Monk's "'Round Midnight" (1944) as an encore. Segueing from the tempo of "Effi", the quartet opened in ballad pace but abruptly transformed in tempo and reworked "'Round Midnight" in an aggressive manner atypical for the jazz standard. After showcasing a solo by Tolliver, the performance slowed down to ballad tempo again and ended on a series of bars played in uptempo.

== Release and reception ==
Live in Tokyo was released on LP by Strata-East around 1974 or 1975. Trio also released the LP in Japan. Reviewing the album in January 1975, a writer for Billboard magazine considered it a "fine addition" to Tolliver and Music Inc.'s catalog of "some of the better jazz albums in recent years". The writer also praised the trumpeter's solos and the accompaniment from Cowell, while commenting on their interpretation of "'Round Midnight" as giving a "fresh new twist" to the composition. Howard Mandel of DownBeat called Live in Tokyo a "very good" LP. Cadence magazine's Bob Rusch was less receptive, finding it "good", yet inferior to some of Tolliver's other Strata-East recordings. He felt the trumpeter sounded uncertain and poorly recorded at times, while the rhythm section of Houston and Barbaro did not provide entirely reliable accompaniment, although he added that Tolliver and Cowell played well enough to not always need it. Rusch was most impressed by "'Round Midnight", calling it a "big surprise". According to The New York City Jazz Record's Thomas Conrad, "small-group Music Inc. recordings" like Live in Tokyo "should have made Tolliver a star (and Cowell too) [...] But for all the cult mystique surrounding Strata-East, the label never made anybody famous."

Retrospective professional reviews
Review scores
Source	Rating
AllMusic	3/5 stars
The Penguin Guide to Jazz on CD	3.5/4 stars
The Rolling Stone Jazz Record Guide	3/5 stars
Tom Hull – on the Web	B+

The album was reissued on CD in 1998 by Strata-East and Charly Records. In Richard Cook and Brian Morton's The Penguin Guide to Jazz on CD (2000), it was appraised as an indication to "some measure of Tolliver's stature as a player", as his performance here was mostly perfect. "Drought" was singled out in the guide for showcasing "his radical simplicities", Barbaro's consistent rhythm, and Houston's typically aggressive bass playing, "a consistent feature" of a concert that only faltered at the end with "'Round Midnight". While the overall audio was well regarded, Cowell was not "recorded to best advantage", according to the guide. In a contemporaneous review for AllMusic of the CD reissue, Scott Yanow applauded Tolliver's playing on the extended renditions of his original compositions and the "adventurous" version of "'Round Midnight". However, he noticed occasionally distorted audio quality, particularly in the rendering of some trumpet sounds, which led him to assign a lower grade to what he deemed an otherwise "strong" post-bop album.

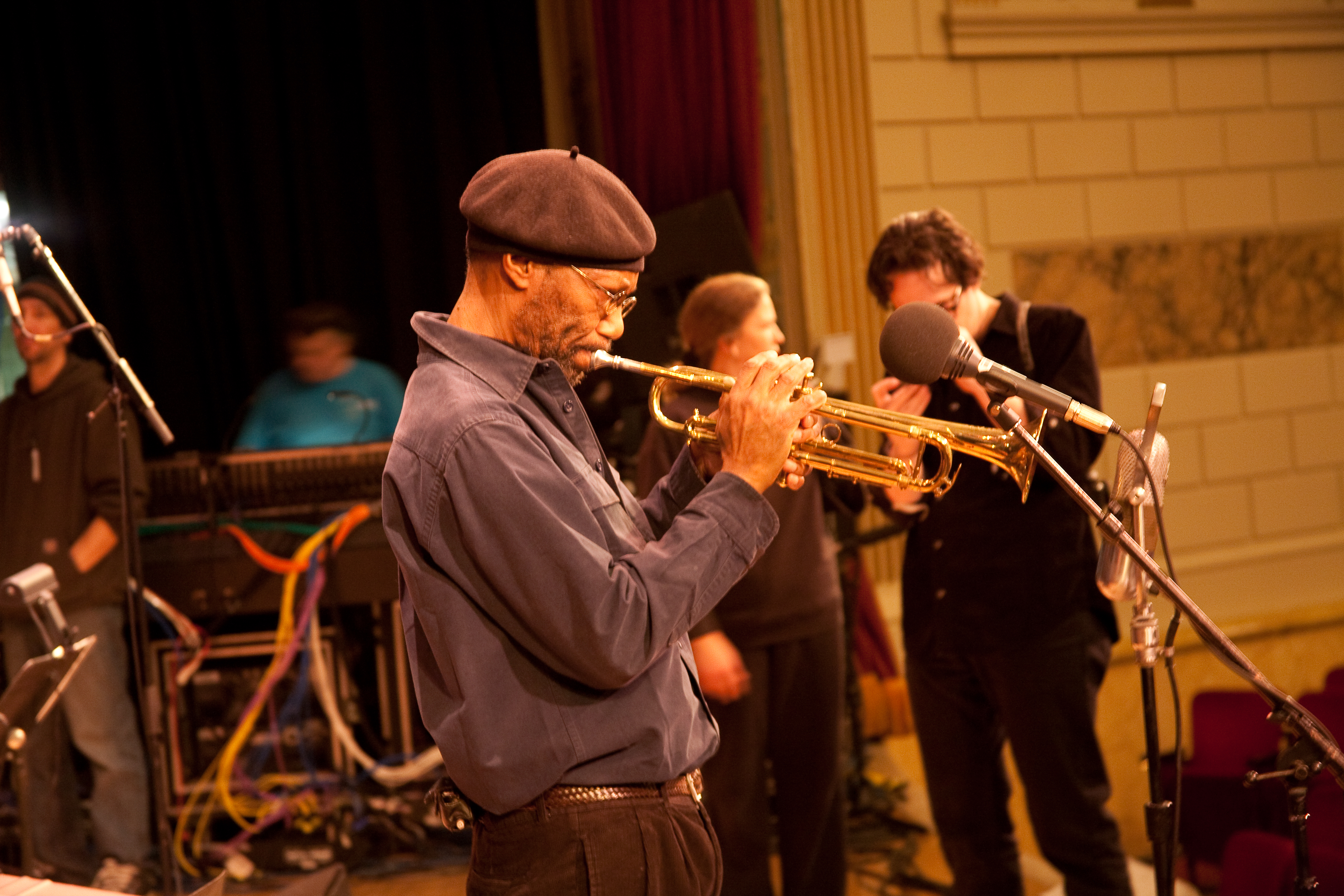
Charles Tolliver in 2009; his performance on the album has received retrospective acclaim.

In 2005, Live in Tokyo was reissued by Mosaic Records as the second disc of the three-CD limited-edition box set Mosaic Select. The set compiled Tolliver's live quartet recordings for three of his early-1970s Strata-East LPs, which by that point had gone out of print. (Note: The first disc of Mosaic Select is Live at Slugs' (recorded in 1970), the second disc is Live in Tokyo, and the third disc has six previously unreleased performances from the other two discs' concerts.) Richard Brody, who had been a big fan of the original LP, reviewed the box set for The New Yorker and appraised the recordings collectively as "fervent, intimate classics of live jazz". He added that "they convey the spirit of the cramped bandstand and the rapt crowd as keenly as Charles Mingus's Debut recordings from the Café Bohemia, Eric Dolphy's Five Spot dates, and John Coltrane's sets from the Village Vanguard". Thom Jurek from AllMusic was also very impressed by the Tokyo disc, highlighting Tolliver and Cowell's "symbiotic" musical interactions on tracks like "Drought" and "Stretch", while finding "'Round Midnight" to be a "radical" interpretation that "has to be heard to be believed".

In All About Jazz, Javier Aq Ortiz described the box set's music as "superior hardcore hard bop material with sympathies toward structured-yet-freer jazz stylistic tendencies" and much "gritted heart" in both compositional and performance aspects. From the Tokyo disc, he called "Truth" "forcefully melodic and endowed with just the right touch" by the quartet and enjoyed "'Round Midnight" for being "all about deeply gutted feeling", while noting the "brighter" recontextualization of Houston's "sinuously mysterious bass solo" on "Effi". JazzTimes critic Nate Chinen also wrote favorably of Music Inc.'s performances on "Effi" and "'Round Midnight". But he ultimately found the Tokyo recordings somewhat marred by inconsistent sound quality and expressed some disappointment in the rhythm section, specifically observing a lack of rhythmic poise in Barbaro on "Drought".

== Track listing ==
All compositions are by Charles Tolliver, except where noted.

Side A

1. "Drought" – 12:22
2. "Stretch" – 10:42

Side B

1. "Truth" – 7:07
2. "Effi" (Stanley Cowell) – 10:46
3. "'Round Midnight" (Thelonious Monk, Cootie Williams) – 8:38

== Personnel ==
Credits are taken from the album's liner notes.

Music Inc.

- Charles Tolliver – trumpet, recording production
- Stanley Cowell – piano
- Clint Houston – bass
- Clifford Barbaro – drums

Technical personnel

- Toshinari Koinuma – concert production
- Masahiko Yuh – MCing
- Kunio Arai – recording engineering
- Shigehisa Nagao – floor engineering
- Ted Plair – graphics

== Bibliography ==
- Anon. (1974). Live in Tokyo (LP liner notes). Charles Tolliver / Music Inc. Strata-East Records. SES-19745.
- Anon. (January 18, 1975). "Billboard's Recommended LPs". Billboard – via Google Books.
- Anon. (February 8, 1975). "New LP/Tape Releases". Billboard – via Google Books.
- Anon. (March 1975). "Recordings" (PDF). Buffalo Jazz Report – via buffalo.edu.
- Brody, Richard (August 12, 2008). "All That Jazz: Charles Tolliver". The New Yorker.
- Chinen, Nate (January 1, 2006). "Charles Tolliver: Mosaic Select 20: Charles Tolliver". JazzTimes.
- Conrad, Thomas (June 2018). "Charles Tolliver: Last Man Standing" (PDF). The New York City Jazz Record.
- Cook, Richard; Morton, Brian (2000). The Penguin Guide to Jazz on CD. Penguin Books. ISBN 9780140514520.
- Giddins, Gary (2004). Weather Bird: Jazz at the Dawn of its Second Century. Oxford University Press. ISBN 9780195304497.
- Hull, Tom (May 3, 2021). "Music Week". Tom Hull – on the Web.
- Jurek, Thom (n.d.). "Mosaic Select: Charles Tolliver - Charles Tolliver". AllMusic.
- Lord, Tom (1992). The Jazz Discography. Vol. 23. Lord Music Reference. ISBN 9781881993223.
- Mandel, Howard (January 25, 1979). "Clint Houston". DownBeat. Vol. 46, no. 2.
- Ortiz, Javier Aq (October 27, 2005). "Charles Tolliver: Mosaic Select: Charles Tolliver". All About Jazz.
- Ratliff, Ben (2008). Coltrane: The Story of a Sound. Farrar, Straus and Giroux. ISBN 9781429998628.
- Rusch, Bob (February 1977). "Charles Tolliver Music, Inc., Live in Tokyo, Strata-East SES-19745". Cadence.
- Swenson, John, ed. (1985). The Rolling Stone Jazz Record Guide. Random House/Rolling Stone. ISBN 0-394-72643-X.
- Yanow, Scott (n.d.). "Live in Tokyo - Charles Tolliver". AllMusic.
