= Handscapes 2 =

Studio album by The Piano Choir
- Released: 1975
- Recorded: August–December 1974
- Studio: Minot Studios, White Plains, N.Y.
- Genre: Jazz
- Label: Strata-East SES-19750
- Producer: The Piano Choir

Stanley Cowell chronology
Musa: Ancestral Streams (1974)	Handscapes 2 (1975)	Regeneration (1976)

The Piano Choir chronology
Handscapes (1973)	Handscapes 2 (1975)	Handscapes 95 (1995)

Handscapes 2 is an album by The Piano Choir featuring Ron Burton, Stanley Cowell, Nat Jones, Hugh Lawson, Webster Lewis, Harold Mabern, and Sonelius Smith recorded in 1974 and first released on the Strata-East label.

== Reception ==
Professional ratings
Review scores
Source	Rating
AllMusic	4.5/5 stars

In his review for AllMusic, Michael G. Nastos simply states "more of the same".

== Track listing ==
Side A:

1. "Ballad for the Beast from Bali-Bali" (Hugh Lawson) - 7:04
2. "The Need to Smile" (Sonelius Smith) - 6:24
3. "Barbara Ann" (Webster Lewis) - 4:47

Side B:

1. "In What Direction Are You Headed" (Harold Mabern) - 6:30
2. "Prayer for Peace" (Stanley Cowell) - 8:45

== Personnel ==
- Stanley Cowell - piano, synthesizer
- Sonelius Smith - piano, electric piano
- Ron Burton, Nat Jones, Hugh Lawson, Webster Lewis, Harold Mabern - piano
- Mtume, Jimmy Hopps, John Lewis - percussion
