= Live at the Loosdrecht Jazz Festival =

Live album by Charles Tolliver's Music Inc.
- Released: 1973
- Recorded: August 9, 1972 in Loosdrecht, Netherlands
- Genre: Jazz
- Length: 57:33
- Label: Strata-East
- Producer: Alan Bates and Charles Tolliver

Charles Tolliver chronology
Live at Slugs' (1972)	Live at the Loosdrecht Jazz Festival (1973)	Live in Tokyo (1973)

Live at the Loosdrecht Jazz Festival is a live album by Music Inc. led by American jazz trumpeter Charles Tolliver recorded in 1972 and first released as a double LP on the Strata-East label, later released on CD as Grand Max by the Black Lion label

== Reception ==
Professional ratings
Review scores
Source	Rating
Allmusic	4.5/5 stars
The Rolling Stone Jazz Record Guide	3/5 stars
The Penguin Guide to Jazz Recordings	3/4 stars

The Allmusic review by Scott Yanow says "Tolliver's music (which holds on to one's attention throughout the live set) has its connections to the bebop tradition but also forges ahead and can be quite passionate. Recommended".

== Track listing ==
All compositions by Charles Tolliver except as indicated

1. "Grand Max" - 11:06
2. "Truth" - 10:13
3. "Prayer for Peace" (Stanley Cowell) - 15:08
4. "Our Second Father" - 15:57
5. "Repetition" (Neal Hefti) - 12:37

== Personnel ==
- Charles Tolliver - trumpet
- John Hicks - piano
- Reggie Workman - bass
- Alvin Queen - drums
