= You Might Be Surprised =

1985 studio album by Roy Ayers

Studio album by Roy Ayers
- Released: August 27, 1985
- Studio: Celestial Sounds (New York City, NY); Mediasound (New York City, NY)
- Genre: Soul jazz
- Label: Columbia
- Producer: Roy Ayers; James Mtume

Roy Ayers chronology
In the Dark (1984)	You Might Be Surprised (1985)	I'm the One (For Your Love Tonight) (1987)

Singles from You Might Be Surprised
- 1. "Slip 'N' Slide" Released: 1985; 2. "Hot" Released: 1985; 3. "Programmed for Love" Released: 1985

Professional ratings
Review scores
Source	Rating
AllMusic	3/5 stars

You Might Be Surprised is a studio album by American musician Roy Ayers. It was released in 1985 through Columbia Records. The recording sessions for the album took place at Celestial Sounds and Mediasound in New York City. The album was produced by James Mtume, Roy Ayers, Philip Field, and Edward "Tree" Moore.

== Track listing ==
No.	Title	Writer(s)	Length
1.	"Hot"	Clarence Brice; James Mtume; Philip Field	4:40
2.	"Programmed for Love"	Douglas Paul Frank; Dunn Pearson Jr.	5:38
3.	"Virgo"	Roy Ayers	4:27
4.	"You Might Be Surprised"	Ivy Ray	3:54
5.	"Night Flyte"	Mtume; Edward Moore	4:32
6.	"Can I See You"	Ayers; David Metcen; Dwayne Perdue	5:26
7.	"For You"	Dave Robbins	4:03
8.	"Slip N' Slide"	Eddison Sainsbury; Vincent Henry; Mtume	4:28

== Chart history ==
Chart (1985)	Peak position
UK Albums (OCC)	91
US Top R&B/Hip-Hop Albums (Billboard)	31
