= Right Now! (Jackie McLean album) =

Studio album by Jackie McLean
- Released: November 1966
- Recorded: January 29, 1965
- Studio: Van Gelder Studio, Englewood Cliffs, NJ
- Genre: Post-bop, hard bop
- Length: 36:24
- Label: Blue Note; BST 84215
- Producer: Alfred Lion

Jackie McLean chronology
Action Action Action (1964)	Right Now! (1966)	Jacknife (1965)

Right Now! is an album by American saxophonist Jackie McLean recorded in 1965 and released on the Blue Note label. It features McLean in a quartet with pianist Larry Willis, bassist Bob Cranshaw and drummer Clifford Jarvis.

== Reception ==
The Allmusic review by Scott Yanow awarded the album 4½ stars and stated: "Altoist McLean was at the peak of his powers during this period and, inspired by the versatile rhythm section... a particularly strong example of Jackie McLean's unique inside/outside music of the 1960s."

Professional ratings
Review scores
Source	Rating
Allmusic	4.5/5 stars
The Penguin Guide to Jazz Recordings	3.5/4 stars

== Track listing ==
1. "Eco" (McLean) - 6:09
2. "Poor Eric" (Larry Willis) - 10:12
3. "Christel's Time" (Willis) - 10:34
4. "Right Now" (Charles Tolliver) - 9:29
5. "Right Now" [Alternate Take] - 11:42 Bonus track on CD reissue

== Personnel ==
- Jackie McLean - alto saxophone
- Larry Willis - piano
- Bob Cranshaw - bass
- Clifford Jarvis - drums
