= Close to You Alone =

Studio album by Stanley Cowell Trio
- Released: 1990
- Recorded: August 2, 1990
- Genre: Jazz
- Length: 48:47
- Label: DIW DIW-603
- Producer: Kohei Kawakami

Stanley Cowell chronology
Sienna (1989)	Close to You Alone (1990)	Live at Maybeck Recital Hall, Volume Five (1990)

Close to You Alone is an album by keyboardist and composer Stanley Cowell recorded in 1990 and first released on the Japanese DIW label.

This recording came about due to a short tour led by drummer, composer Ronnie Burrage. The record company said they were doing a "piano series". This is why this recording shows Stanley Cowell as the band leader.

== Reception ==
Professional ratings
Review scores
Source	Rating
AllMusic	3/5 stars

In his review for AllMusic, Scott Yanow states "Cowell has long had an original style within the modern mainstream and his interplay with his notable sidemen on this program always holds one's interest.". The Chicago Tribune's Jack Fuller said it " is full of rich jazz trio music. Stanley Cowell`s piano dominates with styling of satisfying density. Cowell draws his sustenance from Art Tatum, and it serves him well. His music is full-bodied but never heavy and leaves one wanting more."

== Track listing ==
All compositions by Stanley Cowell except as indicated

1. ""D" Bass-ic Blues" (Cecil McBee) - 5:55
2. "Endless Flight" (Ronnie Burrage)- 8:50
3. "Close to You Alone" - 6:56
4. "Equipoise" - 5:37
5. "Celestrial Mood" (Ronnie Burrage) - 8:48
6. "Serenity" (Joe Henderson) - 5:42
7. "Stella by Starlight" (Ned Washington, Victor Young) - 6:59

== Personnel ==
- Stanley Cowell - piano
- Cecil McBee - bass
- Ronnie Burrage - drums
