= New World (Stanley Cowell album) =

Studio album by Stanley Cowell
- Released: 1981
- Recorded: November 1978
- Genre: Jazz
- Label: Galaxy
- Producer: Ed Michel

Stanley Cowell chronology
Equipoise (1979)	New World (1981)	We Three (1987)

New World is an album by the American musician Stanley Cowell, released in 1981.

== Production ==
The album was produced by Ed Michel. Cowell wrote five of its six songs and did the arranging and conducting of the orchestra. "Come Sunday" is an interpretation of the Duke Ellington composition. Cowell was backed by Eddie Henderson on trumpet, Julian Priester on trombone, and Pat Patrick on reed instruments. The rhythm section included Cecil McBee on bass and Roy Haynes on drums. "Sienna: Welcome to This New World" is a solo piano piece.

== Critical reception ==
Professional ratings
Review scores
Source	Rating
The Buffalo News	4/5 stars
Los Angeles Times	5/5 stars
Omaha World-Herald	3/5 stars
The Rolling Stone Jazz Record Guide	3/5 stars

The Buffalo News called Cowell "one of the more lucid, percussively persuasive and melodically fluent current pianists." The Los Angeles Times praised "the ingenious incorporation of violin and cello along with voices and Latin rhythms in 'I'm Trying to Find a Way'"; the paper later listed New World among the 12 best jazz albums of the year. The Omaha World-Herald considered it to be "shallow" and "easy-listening music".

The Blade-Tribune said that "Cowell's adventuresome keyboard compositions and performing make his music challenging and intriguing." The Plain Dealer stated that "some of the material caters to the funkier side of the pop market in performance, while other selections are straight-ahead jazz." The West Mountain Times considered New World to be Cowell's best album, concluding that he "shows a new maturity and adventurous versatility."

== Track listing ==
Side 1

1. "Come Sunday"
2. "Ask Him"
3. "Island of Haitoo"

Side 2

1. "I'm Trying to Find a Way"
2. "El Space-O"
3. "Sienna: Welcome to This New World"

== Personnel ==
- Stanley Cowell – piano, kalimba, Hammond organ, chimes
- Eddie Henderson – trumpet, electric trumpet, flugelhorn
- Julian Priester – trombone (alto, tenor, bass)
- Pat Patrick – piccolo flute, flute, clarinet, tenor saxophone
- Cecil McBee – bass
- Nate Rubin – violin
- Terry Adams – cello
- Roy Haynes – drums
- Kenneth Nash – percussion
- Judy Lacey – vocals
- Linda Mandolph – vocals
- Robert Mandolph – vocals
