= Kiss This World Goodbye =

Studio album by Mtume
- Released: November 1978
- Recorded: 1978
- Studios: RCA Studios, New York City, New York
- Genre: R&B
- Length: 40:37
- Label: Epic
- Producers: James Mtume, Reggie Lucas

Mtume chronology
Rebirth Cycle (1977)	Kiss This World Goodbye (1978)	In Search of the Rainbow Seekers (1980)

Professional ratings
Review scores
Source	Rating
Allmusic	3/5 stars

Kiss This World Goodbye is a 1978 album by R&B group Mtume. This was their debut album on the Epic Records label as well as the first album featuring vocals by Tawatha Agee.

== Track listing ==
All songs written by Reggie Lucas and James Mtume except where noted.

1. "Theme (for the People) [Opening]" (Tawatha Agee, Lucas, Mtume) – 1:30
2. "Just Funnin'" (Howard King, Lucas, Mtume) – 5:20
3. "Kiss This World Goodbye" – 3:58
4. "Insert" – 0:30
5. "The Closer I Get to You" – 3:58
6. "Love Lock" – 4:56
7. "Funky Constellation" – 4:05
8. "Closer to the End" – 4:32
9. "Metal Flake Mind" – 3:30
10. "Phase I" (Mtume; subtitled "40 Seconds dedicated to all Conga Players") – 0:42
11. "Day of the Reggin" – 3:31
12. "This Is Your World" – 3:28
13. "Theme (for the People) [Exit]" (Agee, Lucas, Mtume) – 0:48

== Personnel ==
Mtume

- James Mtume - lead and backing vocals, keyboards, congas, percussion
- Tawatha Agee - lead vocals, backing vocals
- Reggie Lucas - guitars, backing vocals
- Hubert Eaves III - keyboards, synthesizers
- Basil Fearrington - bass
- Howard King - drums, backing vocals

== Charts ==
=== Singles ===
Year	Single	Chart positions		
Year	Single	US	US R&B	US Dance
1978	"Just Funnin"	—	93	—
