= Illusion Suite (album) =

Studio album by Stanley Cowell Trio
- Released: 1973
- Recorded: November 29, 1972
- Studio: Sound Ideas Studio; New York City
- Genre: Jazz
- Label: ECM 1026 ST
- Producer: Manfred Eicher

Stanley Cowell chronology
| Handscapes (1973) | Illusion Suite (1973) | Musa: Ancestral Streams (1974) |

Illusion Suite is an album by the Stanley Cowell Trio recorded on November 29, 1972 and released on ECM the following year. The trio features rhythm section Stanley Clarke and Jimmy Hopps.

== Reception ==
The AllMusic review by Andrew Hamilton rated the album 4 stars, stating: "Cowell and Clarke display amazing technique ... and Hopps' impressionistic drumming is head clearing.... Hopps plays as if he has four hands with a drumstick in each, Cowell's rolling piano chords are matched in fever by Clarke's bass work."

DownBeat assigned the album 4.5 stars. Will Smith called Cowell eclectic, "Perhaps the most enchanting element of his style is the gorgeous and telling use he makes of dissonance as a tension-builder".

Professional ratings
Review scores
| Source | Rating |
|---|---|
| AllMusic | 4/5 stars |
| The Rolling Stone Jazz Record Guide | 4/5 stars |
| DownBeat | 4.5/6 stars |

== Track listing ==
All compositions by Stanley Cowell

1. "Maimoun" - 7:47
2. "Ibn Mukhtarr Mustapha" - 4:49
3. "Cal Massey" - 6:06
4. "Miss Viki" - 5:22
5. "Emil Danenberg" - 8:29
6. "Astral Spiritual" - 7:38

== Personnel ==
Stanley Cowell Trio

- Stanley Cowell – piano
- Stanley Clarke – bass
- Jimmy Hopps – drums
