= Musa: Ancestral Streams =

Studio album by Stanley Cowell
- Released: 1974
- Recorded: December 10–11, 1973
- Studio: Minot Studios, White Plains, New York
- Genre: Jazz
- Length: 38:04
- Label: Strata-East SES-19743
- Producer: Stanley Cowell and Viki McLaughlin

Stanley Cowell chronology
Illusion Suite (1973)	Musa: Ancestral Streams (1974)	Handscapes 2 (1975)

Musa: Ancestral Streams is a solo piano album by Stanley Cowell, recorded in 1973 and first released on the Strata-East label.

== Reception ==
Professional ratings
Review scores
Source	Rating
AllMusic	4/5 stars
The Rolling Stone Jazz Record Guide	4/5 stars

In his review for AllMusic, Jason Ankeny states "Musa Ancestral Streams remains a relative oddity in the pantheon of jazz's black consciousness movement -- a solo piano set of stunning reach and scope, its adherence to intimacy contrasts sharply with the bold, multi-dimensional sensibilities that signify the vast majority of post-Coltrane excursions into spiritual expression, yet the sheer soulfulness and abandon of Stanley Cowell's performance nevertheless vaults the record into the same physical and metaphysical planes".

== Track listing ==
All compositions by Stanley Cowell

1. "Abscretions" 5:10
2. "Equipoise" - 3:44
3. "Prayer for Peace" - 7:07
4. "Emil Danenberg" - 2:45
5. "Maimoun" - 6:30
6. "Travelin' Man" - 2:56
7. "Departure No. 1" - 5:25
8. "Departure No. 2" - 2:15
9. "Sweet Song" - 3:05

== Personnel ==
- Stanley Cowell - piano, electric piano, kalimba
