= Brilliant Circles =

Studio album by Stanley Cowell
- Released: 1972
- Recorded: September 25, 1969
- Studio: Olmsted Sound Studios, New York City
- Genre: Jazz
- Length: 42:48
- Label: Freedom AL 1032; Black Lion BLCD 760204
- Producer: Alan Bates and Chris Whent

Stanley Cowell chronology
Blues for the Viet Cong (1969)	Brilliant Circles (1972)	Handscapes (1973)

Alternative Cover

Brilliant Circles is the second album led by American jazz pianist Stanley Cowell, recorded in 1969. It was first released on the Freedom label and rereleased on CD with bonus tracks on the Black Lion label.

== Reception ==
Professional ratings
Review scores
Source	Rating
AllMusic	4/5 stars

In his review for AllMusic, Scott Yanow states: "The challenging repertoire falls between advanced hard bop and the avant-garde, consistently inspiring the talented players to play at their most creative. Recommended". There is a consensus among many collectors that the Black Lion CD edition, which includes one bonus track and an alternate take of the title track, was very poorly mastered (with reduced volume in the right channel, resulting in the virtual inaudibility of Tyrone Washington's woodwinds).

== Track listing ==
All compositions by Stanley Cowell except as indicated

1. "Brilliant Circles" – 15:33
2. "Earthly Heavens" (Tyrone Washington) – 7:45
3. "Musical Prayers" (Washington) – 10:12 Bonus track on CD reissue
4. "Boo Ann's Grand" (Woody Shaw) – 9:07
5. "Bobby's Tune" (Bobby Hutcherson) – 10:42
6. "Brilliant Circles" [Take 2] – 15:45 Bonus track on CD reissue

== Personnel ==
- Stanley Cowell – piano
- Woody Shaw – trumpet, maracas
- Tyrone Washington – tenor saxophone, flute, clarinet, maracas, tambourine
- Bobby Hutcherson – vibraphone
- Reggie Workman – bass, electric bass
- Joe Chambers – drums
