= Impact (1972 Charles Tolliver album) =

Live album by Charles Tolliver's Music Inc.
- Released: 1972
- Recorded: March 23, 1972 at the Domicile, Munich, Germany
- Genre: Jazz
- Length: 65:03
- Label: Enja
- Producer: David Winckelmann

Charles Tolliver chronology
Music Inc. (1971)	Impact (1972)	Live at Slugs' (1972)

Professional ratings
Review scores
Source	Rating
Tom Hull – on the Web	B+

Impact is a live album by Music Inc. led by American jazz trumpeter Charles Tolliver recorded in 1972 and first released on the Enja label.

== Track listing ==
All compositions by Charles Tolliver except as indicated

1. "Impact" – 8:05
2. "Brilliant Circles" (Stanley Cowell) – 15:29
3. "Truth" – 9:04
4. "Prayer for Peace" (Cowell) – 15:58
5. "Absecretions" (Cowell) – 11:22 Bonus track on CD reissue
6. "Our Second Father" – 13:43 Bonus track on CD reissue

== Personnel ==
- Charles Tolliver – trumpet
- Stanley Cowell – piano
- Ron Mathewson – bass
- Alvin Queen – drums
