= Regeneration (Stanley Cowell album) =

Studio album by Stanley Cowell
- Released: 1976
- Recorded: April 27, 1975
- Studio: Minot Studios, White Plains, New York
- Genre: Jazz
- Length: 35:34
- Label: Strata-East SES-19765
- Producer: Stanley Cowell and Viki McLaughlin

Stanley Cowell chronology
Handscapes 2 (1975)	Regeneration (1976)	Waiting for the Moment (1977)

Regeneration is an album by Stanley Cowell recorded in 1975 and first released on the Strata-East label.

== Reception ==
Professional ratings
Review scores
Source	Rating
AllMusic	4/5 stars
The Rolling Stone Jazz Record Guide	4/5 stars

In his review for AllMusic, Brian Olewnick states "Regeneration is an interesting, often enjoyable album which, aside from its own small pleasures, provides a snapshot of some of the cross-fertilization in genres occurring at the time".

== Track listing ==
1. "Trying to Find a Way" (Stanley Cowell, Viki-Maimoun McLaughlin) – 3:49
2. "The Gembhre" (Billy Higgins) – 4:30
3. "Shimmy Shewobble" (Marion Brown) – 4:00
4. "Parlour Blues" (Stanley Cowell, Aleke Kanonu) – 5:00
5. "Thank You My People" (Cowell, Kanonu) – 8:30
6. Travelin' Man" (Cowell, Curtis Fowlkes) – 4:00
7. "Lullabye" (Cowell, McLaughlin, Jerry Venable) – 5:45

== Personnel ==
- Stanley Cowell – piano, synthesizer, kora, mbira
- Marion Brown – wooden flute (tracks 3 & 6)
- Jimmy Heath – soprano saxophone, flute, alto flute (tracks 5–7)
- John Stubblefield – zurna (track 5)
- Jerry Venable – acoustic guitar (track 1)
- Psyche Wanzandae – harmonica, flute (tracks 4–5)
- Bill Lee – bass (tracks 2, 6–7)
- Aleke Kanonu – bass drum, vocals (tracks 1, 3 & 5)
- Billy Higgins – drums, gembhre, percussion (tracks 1–3, 5 & 7)
- Ed Blackwell – water drum, parade drum, percussion (tracks 1, 3 & 5)
- Nadi Qamar – mama-lekimbe, percussion, Madigascan harp (tracks 2, 6–7)
- Charles Fowlkes – vocals, electric bass (tracks 1, 5, 7–6)
- Glenda Barnes (track 1) – vocals
- Kareema (tracks 6–7) – vocals
