= Impact (1975 Charles Tolliver album) =

Studio album by Charles Tolliver's Music Inc. & Orchestra
- Released: 1975
- Recorded: January 17, 1975
- Genre: Jazz
- Length: 47:55
- Label: Strata-East SES 19757

Charles Tolliver chronology
Live in Tokyo (1974)	Impact (1975)	Compassion (1977)

Impact is an album by American jazz trumpeter Charles Tolliver's Music Inc. and Orchestra recorded in 1975 and first released on the Strata-East label.

== Reception ==
Professional ratings
Review scores
Source	Rating
Allmusic	4.5/5 stars
The Penguin Guide to Jazz	4/4 stars
The Rolling Stone Jazz Record Guide	5/5 stars

The Allmusic review by Al Campbell awarded the album 4½ stars stating "Impact contained a stimulating progressive edge within an energetic large band (14 horns, eight strings, and rhythm section) format. Tolliver's arrangements are consistently bright and build momentum, while the soloists are given sufficient room to maneuver through the multiple textures".

== Track listing ==
All compositions by Charles Tolliver

1. "Impact" - 7:58
2. "Mother Wit" - 8:21
3. "Grand Max" - 6:22
4. "Plight" - 9:47
5. "Lynnsome" - 7:18
6. "Mournin' Variations" - 8:13

== Personnel ==
- Charles Tolliver - trumpet, flugelhorn
- James Spaulding - flute, alto saxophone
- Harold Vick - flute, soprano saxophone, tenor saxophone
- Charles McPherson - alto saxophone
- George Coleman - tenor saxophone
- Charles Davis - baritone saxophone
- Jon Faddis, Lorenzo Greenwich, Virgil Jones, Jimmy Owens, Richard Williams - trumpet
- Garnett Brown, John Gordon, Kiane Zawadi - trombone
- Jack Jeffers - bass trombone
- Stanley Cowell - piano
- Clint Houston, Cecil McBee, Reggie Workman - bass
- Clifford Barbaro - drums
- Warren Smith - chimes, percussion
- Big Black, Billy Parker - percussion
- Winston Collymore, Noel DaCosta, Gayle Dixon, Noel Pointer - violin
- Julius Miller, Ashley Richardson - viola
- Akua Dixon Turre, Edith Wint Porter - cello
