= The Ringer (album) =

- Original UK release

Studio album by Charles Tolliver and Music Inc.
- Released: 1970
- Recorded: June 2, 1969
- Studio: Polydor (London)
- Genre: Jazz
- Length: 39:14
- Label: Polydor
- Producer: Alan Bates; Chris Went

Charles Tolliver chronology
Paper Man (1968)	The Ringer (1970)	Music Inc. (1971)

Alternate cover
- 1975 US release by Arista Records

The Ringer is an album by American jazz trumpeter-composer Charles Tolliver and his quartet Music Inc., recorded in 1969 and released the following year by the British label Polydor Records. The album's US release followed in 1975.

== Recording and release ==
The Ringer was the first album Tolliver recorded with his quartet Music Inc., formed with pianist Stanley Cowell. They recorded the songs in a session for Polydor Records on June 2, 1969, at the record label's studio in London. The recording was produced by Alan Bates, Polydor's record producer and A&R executive. The label released the album in the UK the following year. Bates' own label Freedom Records later released The Ringer in Europe and Japan, while Arista Records distributed it in the US in 1975.

== Critical reception ==
Professional ratings
Review scores
Source	Rating
AllMusic	5/5 stars
The Rolling Stone Jazz Record Guide	3/5 stars
Tom Hull – on the Web	A−

In his review for AllMusic, Scott Yanow states "Tolliver is heard at the peak of his creative powers; it is strange that he never received the fame and recognition that he deserved".

== Track listing ==
All compositions are by Charles Tolliver.

1. "Plight" – 7:09
2. "On the Nile" – 12:31
3. "The Ringer" – 5:46
4. "Mother Wit" – 8:46
5. "Spur" – 5:02

== Personnel ==
Information is taken from AllMusic.

Musicians

- Charles Tolliver – trumpet
- Stanley Cowell – piano
- Steve Novosel – bass
- Jimmy Hopps – drums

Technical personnel

- Alan Bates – production
- Carlos Olms – engineering
- Chris Whent – production
- Valerie Wilmer – liner notes
