= Live at Copenhagen Jazz House =

Live album by Stanley Cowell Trio
- Released: 1995
- Recorded: April 1993
- Venue: Jazzhus Montmartre in Copenhagen, Denmark
- Genre: Jazz
- Length: 63:32
- Label: SteepleChase SCCD 31359
- Producer: Nils Winther

Stanley Cowell chronology
Angel Eyes (1993)	Live at Copenhagen Jazz House (1995)	Setup (1993)

Live at Copenhagen Jazz House (also referred to as just Live) is a live album by keyboardist and composer Stanley Cowell recorded in Denmark in 1993 and first released on the Danish SteepleChase label in 1995.

== Reception ==
Professional ratings
Review scores
Source	Rating
AllMusic	4/5 stars
The Penguin Guide to Jazz Recordings	3.5/4 stars

AllMusic said the album was "Highly recommended".

== Track listing ==
All compositions by Stanley Cowell except where noted.

1. "Anthropology" (Dizzy Gillespie, Charlie Parker) – 7:56
2. "Bright Passion" – 5:46
3. "Brilliant Circles" – 8:10
4. "Stella by Starlight" (Ned Washington, Victor Young) – 11:57
5. "Prayer for Peace" – 11:08
6. "It Don't Mean a Thing (If It Ain't Got That Swing)" (Duke Ellington, Irving Mills) – 6:07
7. "Autumn Leaves" (Joseph Kosma, Johnny Mercer, Jacques Prévert) – 7:21
8. "In Walked Bud" (Thelonious Monk) – 5:11

== Personnel ==
- Stanley Cowell – piano
- Cheyney Thomas – bass
- Wardell Thomas – drums
