= In Search of the Rainbow Seekers =

In Search Of The Rainbow Seekers

Studio album by Mtume
- Released: July 1980
- Recorded: 1980
- Genre: R&B, funk, new wave music
- Length: 45:06
- Label: Epic
- Producer: James Mtume, Reggie Lucas

Mtume chronology
Kiss This World Goodbye (1978)	In Search Of The Rainbow Seekers (1980)	Juicy Fruit (1983)

Professional ratings
Review scores
Source	Rating
Allmusic	3/5 stars

In Search Of The Rainbow Seekers is a 1980 album by R&B group Mtume. This was their second album on the Epic Records label.

== Track listing ==
All tracks composed by James Mtume and Reggie Lucas; except where noted.

1. "Give It on Up (If You Want To)" (Howard King, Ed "Tree" Moore, Tawatha Agee) - 6:40
2. "You Can't Wait for Love" - 4:52
3. "She's a Rainbow Dancer" - 4:56
4. "We're Gonna Make It This Time" - 4:56
5. "Dance Around My Navel (Doesn't Have to Make Sense, Just Cents)" (Basil Fearrington, Howard King, D. Spence) - 1:59
6. "So You Wanna Be a Star" (James Mtume, Reggie Lucas, Basil Fearrington) - 5:16
7. "Spirit of the Dance" (Hubert Eaves, Tawatha Agee) - 4:18
8. "Anticipatin'" - 4:22
9. "Everything Good to Me" - 4:08
10. "Mrs. Sippi" (James Mtume, Reggie Lucas, Ed "Tree" Moore) - 3:41

== Personnel ==
Mtume

- Mtume - backing vocals
- James Mtume - lead vocals, percussion, keyboards, backing vocals
- Tawatha Agee - lead vocals, backing vocals, percussion
- Howard King - drums
- Ed "Tree" Moore, Reggie Lucas - guitar
- Basil Fearrington - bass
- Hubert Eaves III, Ed Walsh, Pete Cannarozzi - keyboards
- Danny Coleman, Sinclair Acey - horns

== Charts ==
Year	Album	Chart positions	
Year	Album	US	US R&B
1980	In Search of the Rainbow Seekers	119	30

=== Singles ===
Year	Single	Chart positions		
Year	Single	US	US R&B	US Dance
1980	"Give It on Up (If You Want To)"	—	26	30
1980	"So You Wanna Be a Star "	—	60	52
