= Strata-East Records =

American record company and label

- Strata-East promotional design with logo. Flyer reads: In all beginnings... a mystical, magic force, What course, what destiny... determined in time.
- Founded: 1971
- Founder: Charles Tolliver; Stanley Cowell
- Genre: Jazz
- Country of origin: U.S.
- Location: New York City
- Official website: www.serecs.com

Strata-East Records is an American record company and label specialising in jazz founded in 1971 by Charles Tolliver and Stanley Cowell with the release of their first recording Music Inc. The label released over 50 albums in the 1970s. Many of the label's releases are now hailed as prime examples of 1970s post-bop, spiritual jazz, and afro-jazz.

Gil Scott-Heron recorded his 1974 album Winter in America with Brian Jackson for Strata-East. "The Bottle" featured on the album, was a popular single. This album stands as one of the label's best-known recordings.

Clifford Jordan and Bill Lee, father of Spike Lee, were involved in many releases.

== Discography ==
=== SES Series ===
Catalog	Artist	Album	Notes
SES 1971	Charles Tolliver	Music Inc.	
SES 1972	Charles Tolliver	Live at Slugs' Volume I	
SES 1972-0	Charles Tolliver	Live at Slugs' Volume II	
SES 1972-1	Clifford Jordan	In the World	
SES 1972-2	Jazz Contemporaries	Reasons in Tonality	
SES 1972-3	Composer's Workshop Ensemble	Composer's Workshop Ensemble	
SES 1972-4	Mtume Umoja Ensemble	Alkebu-Lan: Land of the Blacks	
SES 19730	The Piano Choir	Handscapes	Stanley Cowell, Nat Jones, Hugh Lawson, Webster Lewis, Harold Mabern, Danny Mixon, Sonelius Smith
SES 19731	Brother Ah	Sound Awareness	
SES 19732	M'Boom	Re: Percussion	Roy Brooks, Joe Chambers, Omar Clay, Max Roach, Warren Smith, Freddie Waits, Richard "Pablo" Landrum
SES 19733	Pharoah Sanders	Izipho Zam (My Gifts)	
SES 19734	Cecil Payne	Zodiac	Kenny Dorham, Wilbur Ware, Wynton Kelly, Albert Heath
SES 19735	Juju	A Message from Mozambique	
SES 19736	Charles Brackeen	Rhythm X	
SES 19737/8	Clifford Jordan	Glass Bead Games	
SES 19739	Billy Harper	Capra Black	Reggie Workman, Billy Cobham, Elvin Jones, Warren Smith, George Cables, Dick Griffin, Julian Priester, Jimmy Owens
SES-19740/1	Charles Tolliver	Live at the Loosdrecht Jazz Festival	
SES 19742	Gil Scott-Heron and Brian Jackson	Winter in America	
SES 19743	Stanley Cowell	Musa: Ancestral Streams	
SES 19744	The Descendants of Mike and Phoebe	A Spirit Speaks	
SES 19745	Charles Tolliver	Live in Tokyo	
SES-19746	Charlie Rouse	Two Is One	
SES 19747	Dick Griffin	The Eighth Wonder	
SES 19748	The John Betsch Society	Earth Blossom	John Betsch, Billy Pluett, Bob Holmes, Ed "Lump" Williams, Jim Bridges, Phil Royster
SES 19749	Weldon Irvine	In Harmony	
SES 7410	The Cosmic Twins	The Waterbearers	John Lewis, Ron Burton
SES 7411	Muriel Winston	A Fresh Viewpoint	
SES 7412	Shamek Farrah	First Impressions	
SES 7413	Charles Sullivan	Genesis	Alex Blake, Anthony Jackson, Lawrence Killian, Alphonse Mouzon, Billy Hart, Sharon Freeman, Onaje Allen Gumbs, Stanley Cowell, Sonny Fortune, Dee Dee Bridgewater
SES 7416	Keno Duke/Contemporaries	Sense of Values	
SES 7417	Cecil McBee	Mutima	
SES 7418	The Ensemble Al-Salaam	The Sojourner	
SES 7420	Juju	Chapter Two: Nia	
SES 7421	Jayne Cortez	Celebrations and Solitudes	
SES 7422	Composer's Workshop Ensemble	We've Been Around	
SES 7423	Sonny Fortune	Long Before Our Mothers Cried	
SES 7425	Charles Davis	Ingia!	
SES 7430	Shirley Scott	One for Me	
SES 7431	Harold Vick	Don't Look Back	
SES 19750	The Piano Choir	Handscapes 2	Ron Burton, Stanley Cowell, Nat Jones, Hugh Lawson, Webster Lewis, Harold Mabern, Sonelius Smith
SES 19752	The Brass Company	Colors	Bill Hardman, Eddie Preston, Harry Hall, Lonnie Hillyer, Billy Higgins, Sonny Brown, with "special guests"; Charles Tolliver, Clifford Jordan, and Stanley Cowell.
SES 19754	Billy Parker's Fourth World	Freedom of Speech	Cecil McBee, Cecil Bridgewater, Ronald Bridgewater, Dee Dee Bridgewater
SES 19757	Charles Tolliver	Impact	
SES 19758	Milton Marsh	Monism	
SES 19759	Larry Ridley	Sum of the Parts	Cornell Dupree, Sonny Fortune, Onaje Allan Gumbs, Grady Tate
SES 19760	John Gordon	Step By Step	Andrew Cyrille, Charles Tolliver, Roland Alexander, Lisle Atkinson
SES 19761	George Russell	Electronic Sonata for Souls Loved by Nature	
SES 19765	Stanley Cowell	Regeneration	
SES 19766	The Heath Brothers	Marchin' On	
SES 7610	The Warm Voice of Billy C	Where Have You Been, Billy Boy?	Charles Davis, Bill Lee, Sonny Brown, Kiane Zawadi, Cliff Lee, Stanley Cowell, George Coleman, Eddie Preston
SES 19771	Shamek Farrah and Sonelius Smith	The World of the Children	
SES 19772	Bruce Johnson and Rodney Jones	The Liberation of the Contemporary Jazz Guitar	Duo
SES 19780	John Gordon	Erotica Suite	Lyle Atkinson, Frank Derrick III, John Miller, James Spaulding, John Gordon, Waymon Reed
SES 8001	Charles Tolliver	Compassion	
SES 8002	John Hicks	Hells Bells	Clint Houston, Cliff Barbaro
SES 8003	The New York Bass Violin Choir	The New York Bass Violin Choir	Lisle Atkinson, Micheal Fleming, Milt Hinton, Richard Davis, Ron Carter, Sam Jones, Bill Lee, Harold Mabern, Sonny Brown, George Coleman

=== SECD Series ===
- SECD 9001 (Bellaphon 660-51-004) - Charles Tolliver Music Inc & Orchestra - Impact, recorded January 17, 1975, released on CD 1990.
- SECD 9002 (Bellaphon 660-51-002) - John Hicks - Hells Bells, Recorded May 21, 1975, released on CD 1990.
- SECD 9003 (Bellaphon 660-51-001) - Charles Tolliver - Live In Berlin At The Quasimodo/Vol.1, recorded July 21/22, 1988, released on CD 1990.
- SECD 9004 (Bellaphon 660-51-008) - Stanley Cowell, Billy Harper, Reggie Workman, Billy Hart - Such Great Friends, recorded July 7, 1983, released on CD 1991.
- SECD 9005 (Bellaphon 660-51-003) - The Heath Brothers Featuring Stanley Cowell - Marchin' On!, recorded 1975, released on CD 1990.
- SECD 9006 (Bellaphon 660-51-005) - John Gordon - Step By Step, recorded September 22, 1975, released on CD 1990.
- SECD 9008 (Bellaphon 660-51-010) - John Hicks - Steadfast, recorded May 21, 1975, released on CD 1991.
- SECD 9009 (Bellaphon 660-51-006) - Cecil McBee - Mutima, recorded May 8, 1974, released on CD 1991.
- SECD 9010 (Bellaphon 660-51-009) - Charles Tolliver Music Inc & Big Band - Music Inc. & Big Band, recorded November 11, 1970, released on CD 1991.
- SECD 9011 (Bellaphon 660-51-007) - Charles Tolliver Music Inc - Compassion, recorded November, 1977, released on CD 1991.
- SECD 9012 (Bellaphon 660-51-012) - Charlie Rouse - Two Is One, recorded 1974, released on CD 1992.
- SECD 9013 (Bellaphon 660-51-011) - Charles Tolliver - Live In Berlin At The Quasimodo/Vol.2, recorded July 21/22, 1988, released on CD 1992.
- SECD 9014 (Bellaphon 660-51-013) - Larry Ridley - Sum Of The Parts, recorded June 1975, released on CD 1992.
- SECD 9015 (Bellaphon 660-51-016) - Charles Tolliver Music Inc - Live In Tokyo, recorded December 7, 1973, released on CD 1992.
- SECD 9016 (Bellaphon 660-51-014) - Music Inc - Live At Historic Slugs', recorded May 1, 1970, released on CD 1992.
- SECD 9017 (Bellaphon 660-51-015) - Gil Scott-Heron/Brian Jackson - Winter In America, recorded September/October 1973, released on CD 1992.
- SECD 9018 (Bellaphon 660-51-020) - Larry Ridley & the Jazz Legacy Ensemble - Live at Rutgers University, recorded 1989, released on CD 1993.
- SECD 9019 (Bellaphon 660-51-022) - Billy Harper - Capra Black, recorded 1973, released on CD 1993.
- SECD 9020 (Bellaphon 660-51-017) - Clifford Jordan - Glass Bead Games Volume 1, recorded October 29, 1973, released on CD 1992.
- SECD 9021 (Bellaphon 660-51-023) - Clifford Jordan - Glass Bead Games Volume 2, recorded October 29, 1973, released on CD 1993.
- SECD 9022 (Bellaphon 660-51-018) - Pharoah Sanders - Izipho Zam, recorded January 14, 1969, released on CD 1993.
- SECD 9024 (Bellaphon 660-51-021) - Cecil Payne - Zodiac, recorded December 16, 1968, released on CD 1993.
- SECD 9026 (Bellaphon 660-51-019) - Charles Brackeen - Rhythm X, recorded January 26, 1968, released on CD 1993.
- SECD 9028 (Bomba BOM542) - Stanley Cowell - Musa • Ancestral Streams, recorded December 10/11, 1973, released on CD 1996.
- SECD 9031 (Bomba BOM545) - Shamek Farrah & Sonelius Smith - The World Of The Children, recorded April, 1976, released on CD 1996.

== See also ==
- List of record labels
