= Handscapes =

Live album by The Piano Choir
- Released: 1973
- Recorded: June 18, 1972 and October 28, 1972
- Venue: The Public Theater, NYC
- Genre: Jazz
- Label: Strata-East SES-19730
- Producer: Geri Hamlin and The Piano Choir

Stanley Cowell chronology
Brilliant Circles (1969)	Handscapes (1973)	Illusion Suite (1973)

The Piano Choir chronology
Handscapes (1973)	Handscapes 2 (1975)

Handscapes is a double live album by The Piano Choir featuring Stanley Cowell, Nat Jones, Hugh Lawson, Webster Lewis, Harold Mabern, Danny Mixon, and Sonelius Smith recorded in 1972 and first released on the Strata-East label.

== Reception ==
Professional ratings
Review scores
Source	Rating
AllMusic	4.5/5 stars

At the time of release Ebony reviewer Phyl Garland said "One needn't be a "piano freak" to appreciate a truly new recording. First of all imagine seven gifted and talented pianists sitting down to seven grand pianos (with electric piano, organ, harpsichord, a few tambourines for spice) and proceeding to tear up these instruments – musically, that is. ...the torrent of sound springing from their 70 fingers is so powerful and majestic as to be unlike anything one has ever heard." In his review for AllMusic, Michael G. Nastos simply states "Brilliant".

== Track listing ==
Side A:

1. "Jaboobie's March" (Hugh Lawson) – 13:40
2. "Straight, No Chaser" (Thelonious Monk) – 6:00
3. "Precious Lord" (Thomas A. Dorsey) – 4:50

Side B:

1. "Sanctum Saintorium" (Sonelius Smith) – 13:40
2. "Nation Time" (Webster Lewis) – 5:40
3. "Effi" (Stanley Cowell) – 6:50

Side C:

1. "Man Extensions" (Danny Mixon) – 31:25

Side D:

1. "The Almoravids" (Joe Chambers) – 15:40
2. "Killers" (Stanley Cowell) – 7:30

== Personnel ==
- Stanley Cowell, Nat Jones, Hugh Lawson, Webster Lewis, Harold Mabern, Danny Mixon, Sonelius Smith – piano, electric piano, vocals, percussion, African piano, harpsichord
