= Equipoise (Stanley Cowell album) =

Studio album by Stanley Cowell
- Released: 1979
- Recorded: November 14, 1978
- Studio: Fantasy Studios Berkeley, CA
- Genre: Jazz
- Label: Galaxy GXY 5125
- Producer: Ed Michel

Stanley Cowell chronology
Talkin' 'Bout Love (1978)	Equipoise (1979)	New World (1981)

Equipoise is a solo album by keyboardist Stanley Cowell recorded in 1978 and first released on the Galaxy label.

== Reception ==
Professional ratings
Review scores
Source	Rating
AllMusic	3/5 stars
The Rolling Stone Jazz Record Guide	4/5 stars

In his review for AllMusic, Scott Yanow states "Cowell has long had an original style within the modern mainstream and his interplay with his notable sidemen on this program always holds one's interest."

== Track listing ==
All compositions by Stanley Cowell except as indicated

1. "Equipoise" - 4:48
2. "Lady Blue" (Cecil McBee) - 4:18
3. "Musa And Maimoun" - 9:11
4. "Dr. Jackle" (Jackie McLean) - 3:14
5. "November Mood" - 8:34
6. "Dave's Chant" - 7:00

== Personnel ==
- Stanley Cowell - piano
- Cecil McBee - bass
- Roy Haynes - drums
