= Consequence (album) =

Studio album by Jackie McLean
- Released: 1979; 2005 (CD)
- Recorded: December 3, 1965
- Studio: Van Gelder Studio, Englewood Cliffs, NJ
- Genre: Jazz
- Length: 36:18
- Label: Blue Note; LT-994; 0946 3 11428 2 6 (CD)
- Producer: Alfred Lion

Jackie McLean chronology
Jacknife (1965)	Consequence (1979)	Dr Jackle (1966)

Alternative cover
- CD Release (2005)

Consequence is an album by American saxophonist Jackie McLean, recorded in 1965 but not released on Blue Note until 1979 as LT-994. In 1993, it was released as part of the four-disc Mosaic compilation The Complete Blue Note 1964-66 Jackie McLean Sessions, which was limited to 5,000 copies. In 2005, it was finally released on a limited edition CD as Blue Note 11428.

== Reception ==
The AllMusic review by Thom Jurek stated: "The music here is much more straight-ahead than on other McLean dates from the 1960s.... This is a welcome addition to the McLean catalog on disc."

DownBeat assigned the album 4.5 stars. Reviewer Larry Birnbaum wrote, "Consequence is a classic of its genre, an album which will delight new listeners as well as old aficionados with its driving urgency and relentless swing . . . Pianist Harold Mabern and drummer Billy Higgins supply a torrid rhythm accompaniment, while bassist Herbie Lewis provides a solid push beneath the mix . . . on the whole the album represents a sharp retreat from the avant garde and a return to the rich motherlode of “inside’’ music that Jackie continues to mine to this day. Not least, it displays Lee Morgan once again at the top of his form—did he ever give less"?

Professional ratings
Review scores
Source	Rating
AllMusic	3.5/5 stars
The Penguin Guide to Jazz Recordings	3/4 stars
The Rolling Stone Jazz Record Guide	5/5 stars
DownBeat	4.5/5 stars

== Track listing ==
All compositions by Jackie McLean except as noted

1. "Bluesanova" (Lee Morgan) - 7:30
2. "Consequence" - 5:32
3. "My Old Flame" (Sam Coslow, Arthur Johnston) - 5:16
4. "Tolypso" - 6:02
5. "Slumber" (Morgan) - 6:05
6. "Vernestune" - 5:53

== Personnel ==
- Jackie McLean - alto saxophone
- Lee Morgan - trumpet
- Harold Mabern - piano
- Herbie Lewis - bass
- Billy Higgins - drums
