= Music Inc. =

Studio album by Charles Tolliver's Music Inc. & Big Band
- Released: 1971
- Recorded: November 11, 1970, NYC
- Genre: Jazz
- Length: 39:52
- Label: Strata-East
- Producer: George Klabin

Charles Tolliver chronology
The Ringer (1970)	Music Inc. (1971)	Impact (1972)

Music Inc. is an album by American jazz trumpeter Charles Tolliver's Music Inc. with a Big Band recorded in 1970 and first released on the Strata-East label.

== Reception ==
Professional ratings
Review scores
Source	Rating
Allmusic	4.5/5 stars
DownBeat	4/5 stars
The Rolling Stone Jazz Record Guide	5/5 stars

The Allmusic review by Jason Ankeny awarded the album 4½ stars stating "The remarkable Music, Inc. Big Band remains the apotheosis of trumpeter Charles Tolliver's singular creative vision. Rarely if ever has a big band exhibited so much freedom or finesse, while at the same time never overwhelming the virtuoso soloists on whom the performances pivots".

== Track listing ==
All compositions by Charles Tolliver except as indicated

1. "Ruthie's Heart" - 6:19
2. "Brilliant Circles" (Stanley Cowell) - 4:53
3. "Abscretions" (Cowell) - 7:03
4. "Household of Saud" - 6:42
5. "On the Nile" - 9:51
6. "Departure" (Cowell) - 5:04

== Personnel ==
- Charles Tolliver - trumpet
- Stanley Cowell - piano
- Cecil McBee - bass
- Jimmy Hopps - drums
- Bobby Brown - flute
- Wilbur Brown, Jimmy Heath, Clifford Jordan - flute, tenor saxophone
- Howard Johnson - baritone saxophone, tuba
- Lorenzo Greenwich, Virgil Jones, Danny Moore, Richard Williams - trumpet
- Garnett Brown, Curtis Fuller, John Gordon, Dick Griffin - trombone
