= Rebirth Cycle =

Studio album by James Mtume
- Released: 1977
- Recorded: 1974
- Studio: Minot Sound
- Label: Third Street Records
- Producer: James Mtume

James Mtume chronology
Alkebu-Lan: Land of The Blacks (1972)	Rebirth Cycle (1977)	Kiss This World Goodbye (1978)

Rebirth Cycle is the second studio album by American musician James Mtume. It was produced by Mtume himself, and released on the Third Street Records label. It is one of a number of contemporary albums described as "some of the most compelling artifacts of the Black Power-Black music nexus", with "explicit endorsements of radical nationalist principles" and "of a very high artistic level and featuring some of the best musicians".

After Mtume's death in 2022, The Guardian, in a retrospective, remarked on the album: "Just as his career as a R&B songwriter and producer was taking off, Mtume put out one final burst of spiritual, Afrocentric jazz, the album Rebirth Cycle. Never reissued legally and unavailable on streaming services, a bootleg or YouTube are your only real options, but it's worth checking out: the lengthy version of 'Sais' is great, and the collection of shorter, soul-influenced tracks on side two – including Umoja – are fabulous, complete with vocals from Jean Carne of 'Don't Let It Go to Your Head' fame."

== Track listing ==
=== A-side ===
1. "Sais (Intro)" - 2:22
2. "Sais" - 20:39

=== B-side ===
1. "Yebo" - 6:07
2. "Cabral" - 4:29
3. "Body Sounds" - 3:42
4. "Umoja" - 6:41

Note: "Body Sounds is an electronically altered conga solo by Mtume accompanied by the band using their bodies as percussion instruments (hands rubbing, chest thumping, etc.). Hence the title Body Sounds."

== Personnel ==
- Bayeté - electric piano
- Cecil McBee - bass
- Dee Dee Bridgewater - vocals
- Jean Carn - vocals
- Pete Cosey - guitar
- Stanley Cowell - piano
- Al Foster - drums
- Billy Hart - drums
- Jimmy Heath - reeds, soprano saxophone, flute
- Michael Henderson - bass
- Leroy Jenkins - violin
- Shirley Jenkins - vocals
- Diedre Johnson - cello
- Azar Lawrence - reeds, soprano saxophone
- Reggie Lucas - guitar
- James Mtume - congas, piano
- Muktar Mustapha - vocals (spoken word)
- Onika - vocals
- Carol Robinson - vocals
- Andrei Strobert - drums
- John Stubblefield - reeds
- Tawatha - vocals
- Buster Williams - bass
