= Waiting for the Moment =

Studio album by Stanley Cowell
- Released: 1977
- Recorded: July 6–8, 1977
- Studio: Fantasy Studios Berkeley, CA
- Genre: Jazz
- Label: Galaxy GXY 5104
- Producer: Ed Michel

Stanley Cowell chronology
Regeneration (1976)	Waiting for the Moment (1977)	Talkin' 'Bout Love (1978)

Waiting for the Moment is a solo album by keyboardist Stanley Cowell recorded in 1977 and first released on the Galaxy label.

== Reception ==
Professional ratings
Review scores
Source	Rating
AllMusic	3/5 stars
Christgau's Record Guide	B+
The Rolling Stone Jazz Record Guide	3/5 stars
DownBeat	4/5 stars

In his review for AllMusic, Scott Yanow called it "An interesting if not quite essential program".

== Track listing ==
All compositions by Stanley Cowell except as indicated

1. "Ragtime" (Jimmy Heath) - 3:04
2. "Boogie Woogie" (Heath) - 3:00
3. "Parisian Thoroughfare" (Bud Powell) - 3:32
4. "'Round Midnight" (Thelonious Monk) - 7:36
5. "Spanish Dancers" (Bill Lee) - 2:15
6. "Sienna: Welcome, My Darling" - 5:16
7. "Sienna: Waiting for the Moment" - 4:40
8. "Coup De Grass" - 4:40
9. "Today, What a Beautiful Day" - 5:17

== Personnel ==
- Stanley Cowell – piano, electric piano, clavinet, synthesizer, kalimba
