= Action (Jackie McLean album) =

Action Action Action

Studio album by Jackie McLean
- Released: Early September 1967
- Recorded: September 16, 1964
- Studio: Van Gelder Studio, Englewood Cliffs, NJ
- Genre: Jazz
- Length: 38:25
- Label: Blue Note; BST 84218
- Producer: Alfred Lion

Jackie McLean chronology
It's Time! (1964)	Action Action Action (1967)	Right Now! (1965)

Action Action Action (a.k.a. Action) is an album by American saxophonist Jackie McLean recorded in 1964 and released on the Blue Note label. It features McLean in a quintet with trumpeter Charles Tolliver, vibraphonist Bobby Hutcherson, bassist Cecil McBee and drummer Billy Higgins.

== Reception ==
The Allmusic review by Scott Yanow awarded the album 4½ stars and stated: "This album is full of exciting music that has long been overshadowed."

Professional ratings
Review scores
Source	Rating
Allmusic	4.5/5 stars
The Penguin Guide to Jazz Recordings	3.5/4 stars

== Track listing ==
All compositions by Jackie McLean except where noted

1. "Action" – 10:54
2. "Plight" (Charles Tolliver) – 7:39
3. "Wrong Handle" (Tolliver) – 7:35
4. "I Hear a Rhapsody" (Jack Baker, George Fragos, Dick Gasparre) – 4:43
5. "Hootnan" – 7:34

== Personnel ==
- Jackie McLean – alto saxophone
- Charles Tolliver – trumpet
- Bobby Hutcherson – vibes
- Cecil McBee – bass
- Billy Higgins – drums
