= Juicy Fruit (Mtume song) =

Single by Mtume

from the album Juicy Fruit
- Released: March 1983
- Recorded: 1982
- Genre: R&B; funk
- Length: 6:00 (album version); 4:32 (UK album edit); 3:44 (7-inch edit); 5:55 (12-inch vocal version); 7:03 (12-inch "fruity instrumental mix")
- Label: Epic
- Songwriter: James Mtume
- Producer: James Mtume

Mtume singles chronology
"So Ya Wanna Be a Star" (1980)	"Juicy Fruit" (1983)	"Would You Like To (Fool Around)" (1983)

"Juicy Fruit" is a song written by James Mtume and released as the lead-off single from Mtume's third album, also titled Juicy Fruit. It features lead vocals by Tawatha Agee. The mid-tempo song is Mtume's most well-known, proving enormously successful on R&B radio stations when first released.

The song reached number one on the Billboard Hot R&B Singles chart on June 4, 1983, and remained there for eight weeks. On the Billboard Pop Singles chart it reached number 45. It was ranked at number 15 among the "Tracks of the Year" for 1983 by NME. Though it never reached the top 40, the single was certified as selling one million copies on July 25, 1983. The song's video had different lyrics, where they replaced "You can lick me everywhere" with "Candy kisses everywhere".

== Background ==
According to group founder James Mtume, he worked on the song while lead singer Tawatha Agee was out on tour with English band Roxy Music. He had finished the Juicy Fruit album while the other band members went home. Mtume then used the Linn LM-1 and was pleased with what he heard. He then called the other band members back into the studio to complete the sessions. At 2 A.M., they completed the track in under two hours. He then called Agee, who was in London in between breaks of the Roxy Music tour. Agee then flew back to the studio, although Mtume didn't have the lyrics written down until Agee started recording. As she was recording the first verse, he was busy composing the second verse. They completed the song in one night and Agee flew back to London after the sessions. Although Mtume loved the song, Agee wasn't happy with it, as she felt her vocals were "dry". The song is about oral sex.

== Charts ==
=== Weekly charts ===
Chart (1983)	Peak position
UK Singles (Official Charts)	34
US Billboard Hot 100	45
US Dance Club Songs (Billboard)	30
US Hot R&B/Hip-Hop Songs (Billboard)	1

=== Year-end charts ===
Chart (1983)	Position
US Hot R&B/Hip-Hop Songs (Billboard)	3

== Instrumental remixes ==
A remix of the song was made in 1983 titled the "Fruity Instrumental Mix", produced by Tony Humphries. This version of the song runs over seven minutes containing mostly instrumental beats featuring the singing vocals of "Juicy Fruit", minus its starting chorus. This is the version sampled for the Notorious B.I.G. song "Juicy", the remix of Montell Jordan's "Supa Star", and the Urban Noize remix of Nicki Minaj's song "Your Love". Biggie's version of "Juicy" is one of the most recognized songs of the late rapper's storied career.

The other instrumental remix titled "The After 6 Mix" runs about three and a half minutes featuring background effects and added instrument sounds. This remix also features vocals from the lead singers of "Juicy Fruit" but to a much lesser extent than in the Fruity Instrumental mix. This version is sampled in the Ant Banks song "It's Going On".
