= It's Time! (Jackie McLean album) =

Studio album by Jackie McLean
- Released: Late June/early July 1965
- Recorded: August 5, 1964
- Studio: Van Gelder Studio, Englewood Cliffs, NJ
- Genre: Post-bop, modal jazz
- Length: 42:54
- Label: Blue Note; BST 84179
- Producer: Alfred Lion

Jackie McLean chronology
Destination... Out! (1963)	It's Time! (1965)	Action Action Action (1964)

It's Time! is an album recorded by a group led by American saxophonist Jackie McLean recorded in 1964 and released on the Blue Note label. It features McLean in a quintet with trumpeter Charles Tolliver, pianist Herbie Hancock, bassist Cecil McBee and drummer Roy Haynes.

== Reception ==
The AllMusic review by Thom Jurek awarded the album 3½ stars.

Professional ratings
Review scores
Source	Rating
AllMusic	3.5/5 stars
The Penguin Guide to Jazz Recordings	3.5/4 stars

== Track listing ==
All compositions by Jackie McLean except as noted

1. "Cancellation" (Charles Tolliver) - 7:45
2. "Das' Dat" - 6:26
3. "It's Time" - 6:35
4. "Revillot" (Tolliver) - 7:51
5. "'Snuff" - 7:47
6. "Truth" (Tolliver) - 6:30

== Personnel ==
- Jackie McLean - alto saxophone
- Charles Tolliver - trumpet
- Herbie Hancock - piano
- Cecil McBee - bass
- Roy Haynes - drums
