= Jacknife (album) =

Studio album by Jackie McLean
- Released: 1975
- Recorded: September 24, 1965 (#1–5); April 18, 1966 (#6–10)
- Studio: Van Gelder Studio, Englewood Cliffs, NJ
- Genre: Post-bop, modal jazz
- Length: 80:45 original LP; 41:36 CD reissue (#1–5)
- Label: Blue Note; BN-LA457-H2
- Producer: Alfred Lion

Jackie McLean chronology
| Right Now! (1965) | Jacknife (1975) | Consequence (1965) |

Alternative cover
- 2002 Limited CD

Jacknife is an album by American saxophonist Jackie McLean. It actually comprises two volumes, one recorded in 1965 and the other in 1966. They were originally given the catalogue numbers BLP 4223 and BLP 4236, but the recordings were then shelved for ten years before being issued together in 1975 as a double LP, with the number BN-LA457-H2. While the 1965 tracks were released on a limited edition CD in 2002, those from 1966 have never been released singularly; however, they can be found on the four-disc Mosaic compilation The Complete Blue Note 1964–66 Jackie McLean Sessions, which was limited to 5,000 copies.

== Reception ==
The Allmusic review by Michael G. Nastos awarded the album 3½ stars and stated: "The single CD (1–5) is quite worthwhile by itself, but tells only half of the story."

Professional ratings
Review scores
| Source | Rating |
|---|---|
| Allmusic | 3.5/5 stars |
| The Rolling Stone Jazz Record Guide | 4/5 stars |
| The Penguin Guide to Jazz Recordings | 3/4 stars |

== Track listing ==
1. "On the Nile" (Tolliver) - 12:34
2. "Climax" (DeJohnette) - 9:20
3. "Soft Blue" (Morgan) - 7:30
4. "Jacknife" (Tolliver) - 6:16
5. "Blue Fable" (McLean) - 5:56

Tracks 1–5 recorded on September 24, 1965.

6. "High Frequency" (Willis) - 11:30
7. "Combined Effort" - 9:21
8. "Moonscape" - 6:51
9. "Jossa Bossa" (Moore) - 6:59
10. "The Bull Frog" (Willis) - 4:28

Tracks 6–10 recorded on April 18, 1966.

== Personnel ==
Tracks 1–5

- Jackie McLean - alto saxophone
- Charles Tolliver (#1, 3, 4), Lee Morgan (#2, 3, 5) - trumpet
- Larry Willis - piano
- Larry Ridley - bass
- Jack DeJohnette - drums

Tracks 6–10

- Jackie McLean - alto saxophone
- Larry Willis - piano
- Don Moore - bass
- Jack DeJohnette - drums
