= Setup (album) =

Studio album by Stanley Cowell Sextet
- Released: 1994
- Recorded: October 1993
- Genre: Jazz
- Length: 59:46
- Label: SteepleChase SCCD 31349
- Producer: Nils Winther

Stanley Cowell chronology
Live at Copenhagen Jazz House (1993)	Setup (1994)	Mandara Blossoms (1995)

Setup is an album by Stanley Cowell with a sextet recorded in 1993 and first released on the historically important Danish SteepleChase label in 1994.

== Reception ==
Professional ratings
Review scores
Source	Rating
The Penguin Guide to Jazz Recordings	3.5/4 stars

AllMusic said the album was "especially noteworthy, for Cowell is a gifted, if underrated, composer. Cowell's talents as a composer are illustrated by memorable post-bop or hard bop pieces".

== Track listing ==
All compositions by Stanley Cowell

1. "Departure" - 11:03
2. "Setup" - 7:11
3. "Varions" - 6:29
4. "Bright Passion" - 7:12
5. "Bip Bip Bam" - 9:18
6. "Sendai Sendoff" - 10:03
7. "Carnegie Six" - 8:30

== Personnel ==
- Stanley Cowell - piano
- Eddie Henderson - trumpet
- Dick Griffin - trombone
- Rick Margitza - tenor saxophone
- Peter Washington - bass
- Billy Hart - drums
