= Give Me Some Emotion =

1979 song written and recorded by Webster Lewis

Single by Webster Lewis

from the album Eight for the Eighties
- Released: 1980 (U.S.)
- Genre: Jazz, disco
- Length: 4:00
- Songwriter(s): Webster Lewis, R. Barnes, C. Pitts
- Producer(s): Herbie Hancock

"Give Me Some Emotion" is a song written and originally recorded by Webster Lewis in 1979. It appears on his Eight for the Eighties LP, and was released as a single in early 1980. His version reached #107 on the U.S. Billboard pop chart and #41 on the U.S. R&B chart.

The song was covered that same year by Merry Clayton with the shortened title, "Emotion." It is the title track of her fourth LP. Her rendition peaked at #53 on the U.S. R&B chart.
