= You, Me and He =

Studio album by Mtume
- Released: July 27, 1984
- Recorded: 1984
- Studio: Eastern Artists Recording Studio, New Jersey
- Genre: Funk, R&B
- Label: Epic
- Producer: James Mtume

Mtume chronology
Juicy Fruit (1983)	You, Me and He (1984)	Theater of the Mind (1986)

Professional ratings
Review scores
Source	Rating
Allmusic	3.5/5 stars

You, Me and He is a 1984 album by R&B group Mtume. This was their fourth album released on the Epic Records label. The title track was interpolated by Aaliyah for her remixes of her cover of "(At Your Best) You Are Love", originally by The Isley Brothers

== Track listing ==
No.	Title	Writer(s)	Length
1.	"C.O.D. (I'll Deliver)"		4:00
2.	"You Are My Sunshine"	Philip Field, James Mtume	4:24
3.	"You, Me and He"		4:23
4.	"I Simply Like"		5:03
5.	"Prime Time"		5:45
6.	"Tie Me Up"		5:18
7.	"Sweet For You and Me" (Monogamy Mix)		5:23
8.	"To Be Or Not To Bop That Is The Question (Whether We Funk Or Not)"		5:03

In 2012 the label Funky Town Grooves re-released the album with additional tracks:

No.	Title	Length
9.	"Interlude"	0:20
10.	"You, Me and He" (Polygamy mix)	5:56
11.	"You, Me and He" (Instrumental rap)	4:23
12.	"I Simply Like" (Dub version)	2:47
13.	"I Simply Like" (Extended version)	5:41
14.	"C.O.D. (I'll Deliver)" (Instrumental)	5:35
15.	"C.O.D. (I'll Deliver)" (Vocal)	5:14

== Personnel ==
- Mtume - backing vocals
- James Mtume - keyboards, lead vocals, backing vocals
- Tawatha Agee - lead vocals, guitar, backing Vocals
- Curt Jones - guitar, backing vocals
- Kevin Robinson - guitar, backing vocals
- Clarence "Binky" Brice - guitar
- Ira Siegel - rhythm guitar
- Raymond Jackson - bass, guitar, synthesizer
- Philip Field - keyboards, synthesizers, synth programming, backing vocals
- Steve "Bam" Becker - drums
- Bernie Worrell, David Frank, Dunn Pearson - synthesizer
- Frank Elmo, Jimmy Heath, Stan Harrison - horns
- Gary "Bone" Cooper - backing vocals
- Angel Colon, Kirth Atkin - scratches
- Vincent Henry - saxophone solo on "You Are My Sunshine"
- Sonny Fortune - saxophone solo on "You, Me, and He" and "To Be or not to Bop That is the Question (Whether We Funk or Not)"
- Ed "Tree" Moore - guitar solo on "I Simply Like"

== Charts ==
Year	Album	Chart positions	
Year	Album	US	US R&B
1984	You, Me and He	77	5

=== Singles ===
Year	Single	Chart positions		
Year	Single	US	US R&B	US Dance
1984	"You, Me and He"	83	2	—
1984	"C.O.D. (I ll Deliver)"	—	20	—
