= Back to the Beautiful =

Studio album by Stanley Cowell
- Released: 1989
- Recorded: July 1989
- Studios: Penny Lane Studios, New York
- Genre: Jazz
- Length: 66:04
- Label: Concord CCD-4398

Stanley Cowell chronology
Sienna (1989)	Back to the Beautiful (1989)	Departure 2 (1989)

Back to the Beautiful is an album by pianist Stanley Cowell recorded in 1989 and first released on the Concord label.

== Reception ==
Professional ratings
Review scores
Source	Rating
AllMusic	4/5 stars

In the Chicago Tribune, Jack Fuller stated "this one is such easy listening that you could be deceived into thinking that is all it is. ...the music is more subtle for its seeming simplicity and more satisfying for its restraint." John Litweiler observed "Stanley Cowell is a straightforward, eclectic, essentially late-bop piano sophisticate, and this program of mostly trio selections is attractively lyrical. ...As composer and arranger, then, Cowell is good here; his improvising, however, is less vital." In his review for AllMusic, Scott Yanow said "Pianist Stanley Cowell displays some of his versatility on this Concord CD".

== Track listing ==
All compositions by Stanley Cowell except as indicated

1. "Theme for Ernie" (Fred Lacey) – 6:59
2. "Wail" (Bud Powell) – 6:18
3. "It Don't Mean a Thing (If It Ain't Got That Swing)" (Duke Ellington, Irving Mills) – 4:55
4. "But Beautiful" (Johnny Burke, Jimmy Van Heusen) – 6:22
5. "Sylvia's Place" – 5:51
6. "Come Sunday" (Ellington) – 9:05
7. "Carnegie Six" – 6:40
8. "St. Croix" – 5:10
9. "Prayer for Peace" – 9:01
10. "A Nightingale Sang in Berkeley Square" (Eric Maschwitz, Manning Sherwin) – 5:43

== Personnel ==
- Stanley Cowell – piano
- Steve Coleman – alto saxophone, soprano saxophone (tracks 5, 6)
- Santi Debriano – bass (tracks 1–9)
- Joe Chambers – drums (tracks 1–9)
