= Blues for the Viet Cong =

Studio album by Stanley Cowell
- Released: 1969
- Recorded: June 5–6, 1969
- Studio: Polydor Studios, London
- Genre: Jazz
- Length: 42:48
- Label: Polydor 583 740; Freedom AL 1032
- Producer: Alan Bates and Chris Whent

Stanley Cowell chronology
| Blues for the Viet Cong (1969) | Brilliant Circles (1971) |

Polydor Cover

Blues for the Viet Cong is the debut album led by American jazz pianist Stanley Cowell recorded in 1969 and first released on the British Polydor label then later released on the Freedom label.

== Reception ==
Professional ratings
Review scores
| Source | Rating |
|---|---|
| AllMusic | 4/5 stars |

In his review for AllMusic, Scott Yanow states "Cowell's style at the time was often modal and already quite powerful".

== Track listing ==
All compositions by Stanley Cowell except as indicated

1. "Departure" - 7:08
2. "Sweet Song" - 3:02
3. "The Shuttle" - 8:07
4. "You Took Advantage of Me" (Richard Rodgers, Lorenz Hart) - 4:47
5. "Blues for the Viet Cong" - 4:18
6. "Wedding March" - 2:49
7. "Photon in a Paper World" - 9:03
8. "Travellin' Man" - 3:34

== Personnel ==
- Stanley Cowell - piano
- Steve Novosel - bass (tracks 1–3, 5–8)
- Jimmy Hopps - drums (tracks 1–3, 5–8)
