= Angel Eyes (Stanley Cowell album) =

Studio album by Stanley Cowell
- Released: 1994
- Recorded: April 1993 in Klampenborg, Denmark
- Genre: Jazz
- Length: 60:28
- Label: SteepleChase SCCD 31339
- Producer: Nils Winther

Stanley Cowell chronology
Bright Passion (1993)	Angel Eyes (1994)	Live at Copenhagen Jazz House (1993)

Angel Eyes is a solo piano album by Stanley Cowell recorded in Denmark in 1993 and first released on the Danish SteepleChase label in 1995.

== Reception ==
Professional ratings
Review scores
Source	Rating
AllMusic	4/5 stars
The Penguin Guide to Jazz	4/4 stars

AllMusic said the album was "Neither cabaret snooze nor avant-garde experiments, these nine piano solos are sublime, low-key mainstream jazz." The Penguin Guide to Jazz called it "A solid hour of flawless piano jazz."

== Track listing ==
All compositions by Stanley Cowell except as indicated

1. "The Night Has a Thousand Eyes" (Buddy Bernier, Jerry Brainin) – 7:39
2. "Morning Star" (Rodgers Grant) – 6:14
3. "Sendai Sendoff" – 5:23
4. "Imagine" (John Lennon) – 6:14
5. "Eronel" (Thelonious Monk) – 6:36
6. "Angel Eyes" (Earl Brent, Matt Dennis) – 7:57
7. "Akua" – 6:52
8. "The Ladder" – 8:41
9. "Abscretion" – 5:13

== Personnel ==
- Stanley Cowell – piano
