= Tawatha Agee =

American singer (born 1954)

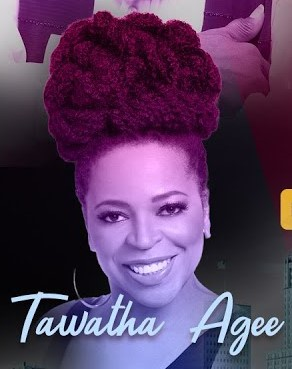
- Agee in 2021

Background information
- Born: November 14, 1954 (age 71); Pittsburgh, Pennsylvania, U.S.
- Origin: New York City, U.S.
- Genres: R&B; soul
- Occupations: Singer; songwriter; backing vocalist
- Years active: 1978–present
- Label: Epic
- Formerly of: Mtume

Tawatha Agee (born November 14, 1954) is an American vocalist and songwriter. Her voice has been described in The New York Times as an "acrobatic, gospel-charged soprano." She was the lead singer of funk and soul band Mtume; her soulful lead vocals are featured on their 1983 R&B hit "Juicy Fruit".

Agee has worked consistently as a backing vocalist from the mid-1970s to the present day, predominantly with James Mtume, who produced her one solo studio album, Welcome to My Dream, for Epic Records in 1987. She is also a part of "the Lovely Ladies" trio, who tour with the Dave Matthews Band.

== Early life and education ==
Born in Pittsburgh, Pennsylvania and raised in Newark, New Jersey, Agee attended Newark Arts High School and Howard University.

== Career ==
=== Mtume and backup singing ===
Agee sang on James Mtume's second studio album, Rebirth Cycle (1977), and on the Mtume album, Kiss This World Goodbye (1978), which features "The Closer I Get to You" (originally sung by Roberta Flack and Donny Hathaway on Flack's 1977 album, Blue Lights in the Basement), and continued with the band on their 1980 follow-up, In Search of the Rainbow Seekers ("Mrs. Sippi," "Give It On Up (If You Want To)"). She also provided backing vocals on three studio albums by Stephanie Mills, What Cha' Gonna Do with My Lovin' (1979), Sweet Sensation (1980), and Stephanie (1981), plus Keep It Comin (1981) by Jean Knight and Premium. Agee cowrote the Stephanie Mills-Teddy Pendergrass duet "Two Hearts" with Mtume bandmates James Mtume and Reggie Lucas and, with Howard King, co-wrote "Getting Ready for Love" for her friend Ullanda McCullough (from her 1982 studio album, Watching You Watching Me). With King she also co-wrote, and sang on, "Keep Goin' On", produced by Mtume and Lucas, for saxophonist Gary Bartz.

Agee was the featured vocalist on many of Mtume's hits, including the oft-sampled "Juicy Fruit" (UK Top 40, 1983, and the number-one R&B spot, in the U.S., for eight weeks in the summer of 1983). She remained with the band through their last two studio albums, You, Me and He (1984) and Theater of the Mind (1986), contributing guitar and keyboard parts, respectively, in addition to vocals.

In 2021, Agee was one of the inaugural honorees inducted into the Women Songwriters Hall of Fame.

=== Solo recording ===
Tawatha Agee's only solo studio album to date, Welcome to My Dream, was issued by Epic Records in 1987 and produced by James Mtume along with James Batton and Mtume bandmate Ed Moore. Agee, Mtume, Moore, and Mtume keyboardist Philip Field wrote songs for the album. Her album produced a top ten R&B hit “Thigh Ride” which peaked at Number 7.

=== Return to backup singing ===
After Welcome to My Dream (1987), Agee focused again on session singing. She has recorded with artists such as Blancmange, Bruce Fisher (Red Hot, 1977), Cabo Frio, Chromeo, the Heath Brothers, David Sanborn, B. B. & Q., LeVert, Kashif, Keni Burke, Luther Vandross, Aretha Franklin, Al Jarreau, Roxy Music, Rena Scott, Jewel, David Bowie, Steely Dan, Blue Man Group, the B-52s, Celine Dion, R. Kelly, Sting, the O'Jays, Laurie Anderson, Foreigner and Scritti Politti. She was also featured on the Hercules (1997) soundtrack as a singing voice of one of the muses.

== Solo discography ==
=== Albums ===
- Welcome to My Dream (Epic Records, 1987)

=== Singles ===
- "Are You Serious?" (Epic, 1987)
- "Thigh Ride" (Epic, 1987)
- "Did I Dream You" (Epic, 1987)
- "Love On Hold" (Glitterbox/Defected Records, 2017) with Aeroplane
