= Live at Slugs' =

- Volume I cover

Live album by Charles Tolliver's Music Inc.
- Released: 1972
- Recorded: May 1, 1970
- Venue: Slugs' (New York)
- Genre: Jazz
- Length: 59:45
- Label: Strata-East
- Producer: Charles Tolliver

Charles Tolliver chronology
| Impact (1972) | Live at Slugs' (1972) | Live at the Loosdrecht Jazz Festival (1973) |

Volume II cover

Live at Slugs' is a live album by American jazz trumpeter-composer Charles Tolliver and his quartet Music Inc. It was recorded in 1970 and released by Strata-East Records as two volumes in 1972.

== Reception ==
Professional ratings
Review scores
| Source | Rating |
|---|---|
| Allmusic | 4.5/5 stars |
| The Rolling Stone Jazz Record Guide | 5/5 stars |

The Allmusic review by Scott Yanow awarded the album 4½ stars stating "The music straddles the boundary between advanced hard bop and the avant-garde and rewards repeated listenings".

== Track listing ==
All compositions by Charles Tolliver except as indicated

Volume I

1. "Drought" - 9:04
2. "Felicite" (Cecil McBee) - 8:05
3. "Orientale" (Stanley Cowell) - 17:32

Volume II

1. "Spanning" - 8:30
2. "Wilpan's" (McBee) -10:37
3. "Our Second Father (Dedicated to the Memory of John Coltrane)" - 13:26

== Personnel ==
- Charles Tolliver - trumpet
- Stanley Cowell - piano
- Cecil McBee - bass
- Jimmy Hopps - drums
