= Paper Man (album) =

Charles Tolliver and his All Stars

Studio album by Charles Tolliver
- Released: 1971
- Recorded: July 2, 1968, at Town Sound Studios, Englewood, NJ
- Genre: Jazz
- Length: 39:09
- Label: Black Lion 2460 139; Freedom AL 1002
- Producer: Alan Bates and Charles Tolliver

Charles Tolliver chronology
Charles Tolliver and his All Stars (1971)	The Ringer (1969)

Paper Man Cover

Charles Tolliver and his All Stars (later reissued as Paper Man) is the debut album led by American jazz trumpeter Charles Tolliver featuring Gary Bartz, Herbie Hancock, Ron Carter and Joe Chambers recorded in 1968 and first released in 1971 on the British Black Lion label. It was reissued in 1975 on the Freedom label under the name Paper Man.

== Reception ==
Professional ratings
Review scores
Source	Rating
AllMusic	4.5/5 stars
The Rolling Stone Jazz Record Guide	4/5 stars

The AllMusic review by Scott Yanow awarded the album 4½ stars stating "This explorative and stirring music is well worth investigating".

== Track listing ==
All compositions by Charles Tolliver

1. "Earl's World" – 4:23
2. "Peace With Myself" – 9:37
3. "Right Now" – 5:47
4. "Household of Saud" – 6:06
5. "Lil's Paradise" – 7:05
6. "Paper Man" – 6:11

== Personnel ==
- Charles Tolliver – trumpet
- Gary Bartz – alto saxophone (tracks 4–6)
- Herbie Hancock – piano
- Ron Carter – bass
- Joe Chambers – drums
