= We Three (Stanley Cowell album) =

Studio album by Stanley Cowell, Frederick Waits, Buster Williams
- Released: 1989
- Recorded: December 5, 1987
- Studio: Big Box 901 Studio, Tokyo, Japan
- Genre: Jazz
- Length: 58:34
- Label: DIW DIW-807
- Producer: Stanley Cowell, Frederick Waits and Buster Williams

Stanley Cowell chronology
Live at Cafe des Copains (1985)	We Three (1989)	Sienna (1989)

We Three is an album by keyboardist and composer Stanley Cowell, recorded in Japan with drummer Frederick Waits and bassist Buster Williams in 1987 and released on the Japanese DIW label.

== Reception ==
Professional ratings
Review scores
Source	Rating
AllMusic	3/5 stars

AllMusic rated the album 3 stars.

== Track listing ==
All compositions by Stanley Cowell except where noted.

1. "Deceptacon" (Buster Williams) – 7:05
2. "Winter Reflections" – 7:57
3. "Enja-J" (Frederick Waits) – 7:16
4. "Sienna: Welcome My Darling" – 5:15
5. "Sendai Sendoff" – 7:28
6. "Air Dancing" (Buster Williams) – 9:33
7. "My Little Sharif" (Frederick Waits) – 6:13
8. "Christina" (Buster Williams) – 7:52
9. "Winter Reflections" [Alternate Take] – 6:46

== Personnel ==
- Stanley Cowell – piano
- Buster Williams – bass
- Frederick Waits – drums
