= Sienna (album) =

Studio album by Stanley Cowell Trio
- Released: 1989
- Recorded: July 8, 1989 in Klampenborg, Denmark
- Genre: Jazz
- Length: 67:52
- Label: SteepleChase SCS 1253
- Producer: Nils Winther

Stanley Cowell chronology
We Three (1987)	Sienna (1989)	Back to the Beautiful (1989)

Sienna is an album by keyboardist and composer Stanley Cowell recorded in 1989 and first released on the Danish SteepleChase label.

== Reception ==
Professional ratings
Review scores
Source	Rating
AllMusic	4/5 stars
The Penguin Guide to Jazz Recordings	4/4 stars

AllMusic rated the album with 4 stars.

== Track listing ==
All compositions by Stanley Cowell except as indicated

1. "Cal Massey" – 4:08
2. "I Think It's Time to Say Goodbye Again" – 9:31
3. "Evidence" (Thelonious Monk) – 6:07
4. "Sylvia's Place" – 5:21
5. "I Concentrate on You" (Cole Porter) – 9:48
6. "Sweet Song" – 9:01
7. "Sienna" – 9:03
8. "Dis Place" – 7:04
9. "Celia" (Bud Powell) – 8:10

== Personnel ==
- Stanley Cowell – piano
- Ron McClure – bass
- Keith Copeland – drums
