= Stanley Cowell =

American jazz pianist (1941–2020)

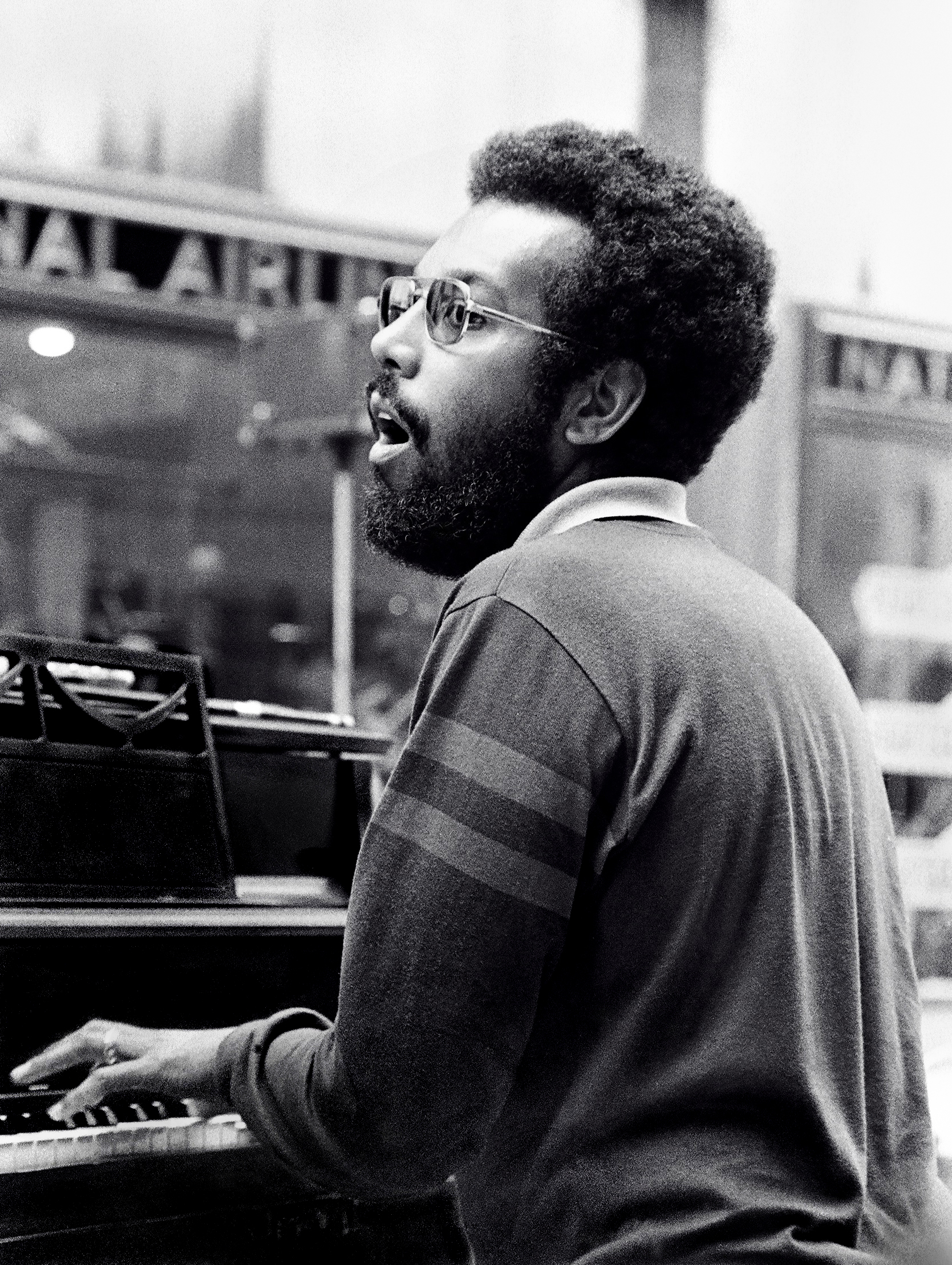
- Cowell playing with the Heath Brothers in Rockefeller Center, June 1977

Background information
- Born: May 5, 1941; Toledo, Ohio, U.S.
- Died: December 17, 2020 (aged 79) Dover, Delaware, U.S.
- Genre: Jazz
- Occupation: Musician
- Instrument: Piano
- Labels: Arista, DIW, Galaxy, SteepleChase, Strata-East
- Formerly of: Roland Kirk, Marion Brown, Charles Tolliver, Max Roach

Stanley Cowell (May 5, 1941 – December 17, 2020) was an American jazz pianist and co-founder of the Strata-East Records label.

== Early life ==
Cowell was born in Toledo, Ohio. He began playing the piano around the age of four, and became interested in jazz after seeing Art Tatum, at the age of six, playing You Took Advantage of Me at his parents' house. Tatum was a family friend.

After high school, Cowell studied classical piano with Emil Danenberg at Oberlin Conservatory of Music He included "Emil Danenberg" in his 1973 suite "Musa: Ancestral Dreams". During his time at Oberlin, he played with jazz multi-instrumentalist Roland Kirk, which proved to be formative. He went on to receive a graduate degree in classical piano from the University of Michigan. He moved to New York in the mid-1960s.

== Later life and career ==
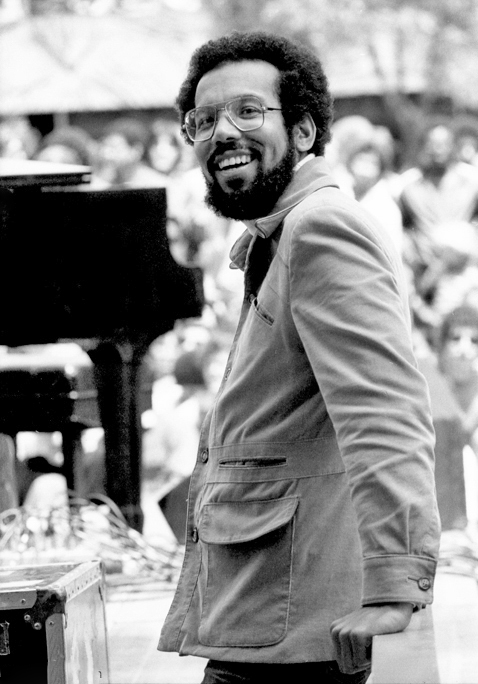
Cowell with the Heath Brothers at Sproul Plaza, University of California, Berkeley, May 1980

Cowell played with Marion Brown, Max Roach, Bobby Hutcherson, Clifford Jordan, Harold Land, Sonny Rollins and Stan Getz. Cowell played with trumpeter Charles Moore and others in the Detroit Artist's Workshop Jazz Ensemble in 1965–66.

In 1971, Cowell co-founded the record label Strata-East with trumpeter Charles Tolliver. The label would become one of the most successful Black-led, independent labels of its day.

During the late 1980s, Cowell was part of a regular quartet led by J.J. Johnson. Cowell taught in the Music Department of the Mason Gross School of the Arts at Rutgers University in New Jersey.

On December 17, 2020, Cowell died at Bayhealth Hospital in Dover, Delaware, from hypovolemic shock. He was 79 years old.

== Discography ==
=== As leader ===
Recording date	Title	Label	Year released	Notes
1969–06	Blues for the Viet Cong	Freedom	1969	Trio, with Steve Novosel (bass), Jimmy Hopps (drums); also released as Travellin' Man by Black Lion
1969–09	Brilliant Circles	Freedom	1972	With Woody Shaw (trumpet, maracas), Tyrone Washington (tenor sax, flute, clarinet, maracas, tambourine), Bobby Hutcherson (vibraphone), Reggie Workman (bass, electric bass), Joe Chambers (drums)
1972–06, 1972–10	Handscapes	Strata-East	1973	As The Piano Choir; with Nat Jones, Hugh Lawson, Webster Lewis, Harold Mabern, Danny Mixon and Sonelius Smith (piano, electric piano, vocals, percussion, African piano, harpsichord)
1972-11	Illusion Suite	ECM	1973	Trio, with Stanley Clarke (bass), Jimmy Hopps (drums)
1973-11	Musa: Ancestral Streams	Strata-East	1974	Solo piano, electric piano, kalimba
1974–08 – 1974–12	Handscapes 2	Strata-East	1975	As The Piano Choir; with Sonelius Smith (piano, electric piano), Ron Burton, Nat Jones, Hugh Lawson, Webster Lewis and Harold Mabern (piano), Mtume, Jimmy Hopps and John Lewis (percussion)
1975–04	Regeneration	Strata-East	1976	With Marion Brown (wooden flute), Jimmy Heath (soprano sax, flute, alto flute), John Stubblefield (zuna), Jerry Venable (guitar), Psyche Wanzandae (harmonica, flute), Bill Lee (bass), Aleke Kanonu (bass drum, vocals), Billy Higgins (drums, gembhre, percussion), Ed Blackwell (water drum, parade drum, percussion), Nadi Quamar (mama-lekimbe, percussion, Madigascan harp), Charles Fowlkes (vocals, electric bass), Glenda Barnes and Kareema (vocals)
1977–06	Waiting for the Moment	Galaxy	1977	Solo piano, electric piano, clavinet, synthesizer, kalimba
1977	Talkin' 'bout Love	Galaxy	1978	With Albert "Tootie" Heath (drums), Keith Hatchel (electric bass), Clifford Coulter (guitar), Kenneth Nash (finger cymbals, gong, congas), Julian Priester (trombone), Eddie Henderson (trumpet), Charles B. Fowlkes, Jr. (vocals), Loretta Devine (vocals)
1978-11	Equipoise	Galaxy	1979	Trio, with Cecil McBee (bass), Roy Haynes (drums)
1978–11	New World	Galaxy	1981	Large ensemble, with Eddie Henderson (trumpet, electric trumpet, flugelhorn), Julian Priester (trombone (alto, tenor, bass)), Pat Patrick (piccolo flute, flute, clarinet, tenor saxophone), Cecil McBee (bass), Nate Rubin (violin), Terry Adams (cello), Roy Haynes (drums), Kenneth Nash (percussion), Judy Lacey (vocals), Linda Mandolph (vocals), Robert Mandolph (vocals)
1983–07	Such Great Friends	Strata-East	1991	Quartet, with Billy Harper (tenor sax), Reggie Workman (bass), Billy Hart (drums)
1985–06	Live at Cafe Des Copains	Unisson	1986	Solo piano; in concert
1987–12	We Three	DIW	1989	Trio, with Buster Williams (bass), Frederick Waits (drums)
1989–07	Back to the Beautiful	Concord Jazz	1989	One track solo piano; most tracks trio, with Santi Debriano (bass), Joe Chambers (drums); some tracks quartet, with Steve Coleman (alto sax, soprano sax) added
1989–07	Sienna	SteepleChase	1989	Trio, with Ron McClure (bass), Keith Copeland (drums)
1990–03	Departure No. 2	SteepleChase	1990	Trio, with Bob Cranshaw (bass), Keith Copeland (drums)
1990–06	Live at Maybeck Recital Hall, Volume Five	Concord Jazz	1990	Solo piano; in concert
1990–08	Close to You Alone	DIW	1990	Trio, with Cecil McBee (bass), Ronnie Burrage (drums)
1991–08	Games	SteepleChase	1991	Trio, with Cheyney Thomas (bass), Wardell Thomas (drums)
1993–04	Bright Passion	SteepleChase	1993	Trio, with Cheyney Thomas (bass), Wardell Thomas (drums)
1993–04	Angel Eyes	SteepleChase	1994	Solo piano
1993–04	Live at Copenhagen Jazz House	SteepleChase	1995	Trio, with Cheyney Thomas (bass), Wardell Thomas (drums); in concert
1993–10	Setup	SteepleChase	1994	Sextet, with Eddie Henderson (trumpet), Dick Griffin (trombone), Rick Margitza (tenor sax), Peter Washington (bass), Billy Hart (drums)
1995–11	Mandara Blossoms	SteepleChase	1996	With Billy Pierce (tenor sax), Jeff Halsey (bass), Ralph Peterson (drums), Karen Francis (vocals)
1996–10	Hear Me One	SteepleChase	1997	With Bruce Williams (alto sax), Dwayne Burno, Keith Copeland (drums)
1999–06	Dancers in Love	Venus	2000	Trio, with Tarus Mateen (bass), Nasheet Waits (drums)
2010–02	Prayer for Peace	SteepleChase	2010	Trio, with Mike Richmond (bass), Victor Lewis (drums)
2011–12	It's Time	SteepleChase	2012	Trio, with Tom DiCarlo (bass), Chris Brown (drums)
2011–12	Welcome to This New World	SteepleChase	2013	Empathlectrik Quartet With Vic Juris (guitar), Tom DiCarlo (bass), Chris Brown (drums)
2014–03	Are You Real?	SteepleChase	2014	Trio, with Jay Anderson (bass), Billy Drummond (drums)
2014–11	Juneteenth	Vision Fugitive	2015	Solo piano
2015–02	Reminiscent	SteepleChase	2015	Trio, with Jay Anderson (bass), Billy Drummond (drums)
2015–12	No Illusions	SteepleChase	2017	Quartet, with Bruce Williams (alto sax, flute), Jay Anderson (bass), Billy Drummond (drums)
2019–10	Live at Keystone Korner Baltimore	SteepleChase	2020	Quintet, with Freddie Hendrix (trumpet), Bruce Williams (alto sax), Tom DiCarlo (bass), Vince Ector (drums), Sunny Cowell (vocal); in concert

=== As a member ===
The Heath Brothers

- Marchin' On (Strata-East, 1976)
- Passing Thru (Columbia, 1978)
- In Motion (Columbia, 1979)
- Live at the Public Theater (Columbia, 1980) – live
- Expressions of Life (Columbia, 1980)
- Brotherly Love (Antilles, 1981)
- Brothers and Others (Antilles, 1984) – rec. 1983

=== As sideman ===
With Marion Brown

- Three for Shepp (Impulse!, 1967) – rec. 1966
- Why Not? (ESP-Disk, 1968) – rec. 1966
- Vista (Impulse!, 1975)

With Larry Coryell

- Equipoise (Muse, 1985)
- Toku Do (Muse, 1987)

With Richard Davis

- Fancy Free (Galaxy, 1977)
- Way Out West (Muse, 1980) – rec. 1977

With Roy Haynes

- Thank You Thank You (Galaxy, 1977)
- Vistalite (Galaxy, 1979) – rec. 1977

With Jimmy Heath

- Love and Understanding (Muse, 1973)
- The Time and the Place (Landmark, 1994) – rec. 1977

With Bobby Hutcherson

- Now! (Blue Note, 1970) – rec. 1969
- Spiral (Blue Note, 1979) – rec. 1968
- Patterns (Blue Note, 1980) – rec. 1968
- Medina (Blue Note, 1980) – rec. 1969

With Art Pepper

- Art Pepper Today (Galaxy, 1978)
- Winter Moon (Galaxy, 1980)
- One September Afternoon (Galaxy, 1980)

With Charles Tolliver

- The Ringer (Polydor, 1969)
- Live at Slugs' (Strata-East, 1970)
- Music Inc. (Strata-East, 1971)
- Impact (Enja, 1972)
- Live in Tokyo (Strata-East, 1973)
- Impact (Strata-East, 1975)
- With Love (Blue Note, 2006)
- Emperor March: Live at the Blue Note (Half Note, 2009)

With others

- Rashied Ali, First Time Out: Live at Slugs 1967 (Survival, 2020)
- Jay Clayton, Live at Jazz Alley (ITM Pacific, 1991)
- Gary Bartz, Another Earth (Milestone, 1969)
- Sonny Fortune, Long Before Our Mothers Cried (Strata-East, 1974)
- Stan Getz, The Song Is You (Laserlight, 1996)
- Johnny Griffin, Birds and Ballads (Galaxy,1978)
- J.J. Johnson, Standards-Live At The Village Vanguard (Antilles, 1991)
- Clifford Jordan, Glass Bead Games (Strata-East, 1974)
- James Mtume, Rebirth Cycle (Third Street, 1977)
- Oliver Nelson, Swiss Suite (Flying Dutchman, 1972)
- Jimmy Owens, Headin' Home (A&M/Horizon, 1978)
- Max Roach, Members, Don't Git Weary (Atlantic, 1968)
- Charles Sullivan, Genesis (Strata-East, 1974)
- Buddy Terry, Awareness (Mainstream, 1971)
