= Webster Lewis =

American jazz musician (1943-2002)

- Birth name: Webster Samuel Lewis
- Born: September 1, 1943; Baltimore, Maryland, U.S.
- Died: November 20, 2002 (aged 59); Barryville, New York, U.S.
- Genres: Jazz, disco
- Occupation(s): Composer, arranger
- Years active: 1972–2002
- Partner: Libre Jasiri

Webster Samuel Lewis (September 1, 1943 – November 20, 2002) was an American jazz and disco composer, arranger and keyboardist.

== Career ==
Lewis was born in 1943 in Baltimore, Maryland. At a young age, his family encouraged him to take up music. Later, he earned a bachelor's degree in sociology from Morgan State University. As a student at Morgan State University, Lewis was one of twelve students who founded Iota Phi Theta fraternity.

Webster then completed a master's degree at the New England Conservatory of Music with Gunther Schuller as his mentor. He started out in jazz working with drummer Tony Williams, George Russell, Bill Evans, Stanton Davis, and the Piano Choir. His first release was Live at Club 7, issued in 1972. He signed with Epic Records in 1976 and began releasing disco music, where he found commercial success. He had several charting singles including 1977's "On the Town/Saturday Night Steppin' Out/Do It with Style" (U.S. Club Play #36) and 1980's "Give Me Some Emotion" (U.S. #107, R&B Singles #41).

Lewis worked extensively as a session musician and studio arranger, for Herbie Hancock, Barry White (he also toured with both of them), and others. He also produced for such artists as Gwen McCrae and Michael Wycoff. He later branched into soundtrack work for film and television, including for the films The Hearse (1980), Body and Soul (1981) and My Tutor (1983).

He also taught jazz voice and arrangement classes at Howard University in Washington as a visiting professor from 1995 to 1999.

Lewis died at his home in Barryville, New York, on November 20, 2002, as a result of pneumonia and diabetes.

== Discography ==
=== Albums ===
Year	Album	Chart positions			Label
Year	Album	US	US R&B	US Jazz	Label
1972	Live at Club 7	—	—	—	Sonet
1976	On the Town	—	—	—	Epic
1978	Touch My Love	—	—	—	Epic
1979	8 for the 80's	114	21	—	Epic
1981	Let Me Be the One	—	49	21	Epic
1981	Welcome Aboard (with the Love Unlimited Orchestra)	—	—	—	Unlimited Gold
"—" denotes releases that did not chart.

With The Piano Choir

- Handscapes (Strata-East, 1973)
- Handscapes 2 (Strata-East, 1975)

=== Singles ===
Year	Title	Peak chart positions		
Year	Title	US Pop	US R&B	US Dance
1977	"Saturday Night Steppin' Out"	―	―	1
1977	"On the Town"	―	―	1
1977	"Do It with Style"	―	―	1
1978	"Touch My Love"	―	―	―
1979	"You Deserve to Dance"	―	―	―
1979	"Fire"	―	―	―
1980	"Give Me Some Emotion"	107	41	―
1981	"Kemo-Kimo"	―	69	68
1981	"Let Me Be the One"	―	64	68
1981	"Night Life in the City" (with the Love Unlimited Orchestra)	―	―	―
1981	"Welcome Aboard" (with the Love Unlimited Orchestra)	―	―	―
"—" denotes releases that did not chart.
