= Charles Tolliver =

American jazz trumpeter and composer

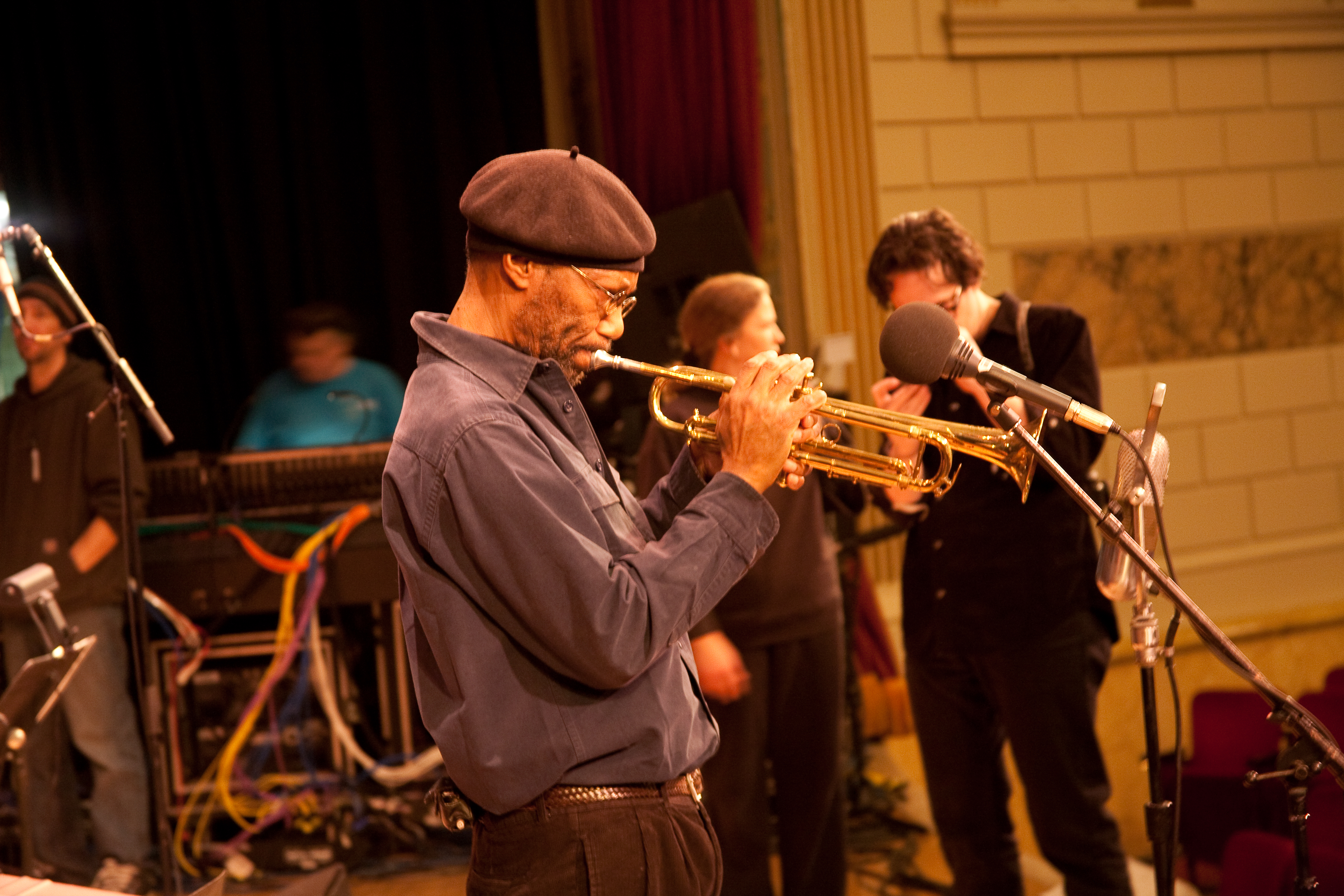
- Charles Tolliver at The Town Hall in 2009

Background information
- Born: March 6, 1942 (age 83); Jacksonville, Florida, US
- Origin: New York City
- Genres: Jazz
- Occupation: Musician
- Instrument: Trumpet
- Years active: 1960s–present
- Labels: Strata-East
- Website: charlestolliver.com

Charles Tolliver (born March 6, 1942) is an American jazz trumpeter, composer, and co-founder of Strata East Records.

== Biography ==
Tolliver was born in Jacksonville, Florida, in 1942 and moved with his family to New York City when he was 10. During his childhood, his grandmother gave him his first horn, a cornet he had coveted. Tolliver attended Howard University in the early 1960s as a pharmacy major, when he decided to pursue music as a career and return home to New York City. He came to prominence in 1964, playing and recording on Jackie McLean's Blue Note albums. In 1971, Tolliver and Stanley Cowell founded Strata-East Records, and Tolliver released many albums and collaborations on Strata-East. Following a long hiatus, he reemerged in the late 2000s, releasing two albums arranged for big band, With Love and Emperor March. With Love was nominated in 2007 for a Grammy award for Best Large Jazz Ensemble.

He would later describe his experience: "There was so much going on with the music. Like with bebop, we had a long period of just salivating on. There were all these different idioms within a genre, the avant-garde and free music, bebop still, and of course the music of John Coltrane and Miles. It was just a hell of a period. And then there was also the political scene going on...."

== Discography ==
=== As leader ===
- 1965: "Brilliant Corners" on The New Wave in Jazz (Impulse!)
- 1968: Charles Tolliver and his All Stars (Black Lion), later reissued as Paper Man (Freedom)
- 1970: The Ringer (Polydor)
- 1970: Live at Slugs' (Strata-East)
- 1971: Music Inc. (Strata-East)
- 1972: Impact (Enja)
- 1972: Live at the Loosdrecht Jazz Festival (Strata-East), also released as Grand Max (Black Lion)
- 1974/1975: Live in Tokyo (Strata-East)
- 1975: Impact (Strata-East)
- 1977: Compassion (Strata-East), also released as New Tolliver (Baystate)
- 1988: Live in Berlin at the Quasimodo Vol. 1 (Strata-East)
- 1988: Live in Berlin at the Quasimodo Vol. 2 (Strata-East)
- 2006: With Love (Blue Note)
- 2009: Emperor March: Live at the Blue Note (Half Note)
- 2020: Connect (Gearbox Records)
- 2024: Live at the Captain's Cabin (Reel To Real)

=== As a sideman ===
With Roy Ayers

- Virgo Vibes (Atlantic, 1967)
- Stoned Soul Picnic (Atlantic, 1968)
- Red Black & Green (Polydor, 1973)
- Daddy Bug & Friends (Atlantic, 1976)

With Gary Bartz

- Another Earth (Milestone, 1969)

With The Brass Company

- Colors (Strata-East, 1975)

With Doug Carn

- Spirit of the New Land (Black Jazz, 1972)

With Michael Cooper

- Get Closer (Reprise, 1992)

With Booker Ervin

- Structurally Sound (Pacific Jazz, 1966)
- Booker 'n' Brass (Pacific Jazz, 1967)

With John Gordon

- Step By Step (Strata-East, 1976)

With Keyon Harrold

- Introducing Keyon Harrold (Criss Cross Jazz, 2009)

With Louis Hayes

- Light and Lively (SteepleChase, 1989)
- The Crawl (Candid, 1989)
- Una Max (SteepleChase, 1989)

With Andrew Hill

- One for One (Blue Note, 1965, 1969, 1970 [1975])
- Dance with Death (Blue Note, 1968 [1980])
- Time Lines (Blue Note, 2006)

With Jackie McLean

- It's Time! (Blue Note, 1964)
- Action Action Action (Blue Note, 1964)
- Jacknife (Blue Note, 1965)

With Oliver Nelson

- Swiss Suite (Flying Dutchman, 1971)

With The Reunion Legacy Band

- The Legacy (Early Bird, 1991)

With Max Roach

- Members, Don't Git Weary (Atlantic, 1968)

With Horace Silver

- Serenade to a Soul Sister (Blue Note, 1968)

With McCoy Tyner

- Song for My Lady (Milestone, 1972)

With Gerald Wilson

- Live and Swinging (Pacific Jazz, 1967)
