= James Mtume =

American jazz and R&B musician (1946–2022)

- Also known as: Mtume
- Born: James Forman; January 3, 1946; Philadelphia, Pennsylvania, U.S.
- Died: January 9, 2022 (aged 76) South Orange, New Jersey, U.S.
- Genres: R&B; soul; post-disco; funk; gospel; jazz
- Occupations: Singer; songwriter; multi-instrumentalist; radio personality; record producer
- Instruments: Vocals, percussion, keyboards
- Years active: 1961–2022
- Labels: Blue Note; Columbia; Capitol; Mainstream; Prestige; Third Street; Epic; RCA

James Forman (January 3, 1946 – January 9, 2022), known professionally as Mtume or James Mtume, was an American jazz and R&B musician, songwriter, record producer, activist, and radio personality.

He came to prominence as a jazz musician, working with Miles Davis between 1971 and 1975. Mtume's R&B group, also called Mtume, is best known for the 1983 R&B hit song "Juicy Fruit", which has been repeatedly sampled, most notably by The Notorious B.I.G. on his hit "Juicy". Mtume the band also had a top-five R&B hit with the single "You, Me, and He".

== Life and career ==
Mtume was born James Forman on January 3, 1946, in Philadelphia, Pennsylvania. He was the son of jazz saxophonist Jimmy Heath, and was raised by his mother, Bertha Forman, and his stepfather, a Philadelphia local jazz pianist, James "Hen Gates" Forman.

He grew up in a musical environment with jazz musicians frequenting his parents' house. He learned to play piano and percussion; however, from his teenage years he was pursuing athletics as a swimmer, having achieved the title of the first black Middle Atlantic AAU champion in the backstroke, and in 1966 he entered Pasadena City College on a swimming scholarship.

In 1966, Mtume joined the US Organization, a Black empowerment group founded by Hakim Jamal and Maulana Karenga, while a student at Pasadena City College. Mtume received his name, which means "messenger" in Swahili, from Karenga who gave members of the organization names to match their personality traits. He was part of the group which celebrated the first Kwanzaa in 1966. In 1967 he co-edited The Quotable Karenga with Clyde Halisi, which has been called "the best expression of Karenga's ideas". Mtume left the US Organisation in 1969. In 1995 he met Louis Farrakhan and remained close to him until the end of his life.

Mtume's professional debut was on Kawaida, a 1969 album by his uncle, Albert Heath. His first recording released under his own name was Alkebu-lan: Land of the Blacks, recorded live at The East, a Black nationalist community arts and education center in Brooklyn, and released on Strata-East Records. Both albums were intended to merge free jazz and cultural identity.

After his return from the West Coast he moved to New York City and had his first gigs as a sideman for McCoy Tyner (Asante album), Freddie Hubbard, and Miles Davis, whose group he wound up joining and playing in for the next few years.

With fellow Mtume band member Reggie Lucas, he won the Grammy Award for Best R&B Song for writing and producing Stephanie Mills' top-ten hit "Never Knew Love Like This Before", for which she also won a Grammy for Best Female R&B Vocal Performance.

In 1994, Mtume created music for the show New York Undercover while also creating musical appearance opportunities for other artists on the show.

In July 2018, Mtume filed a lawsuit against Sony Music/Epic Records, hoping to reclaim the rights for two albums and his hit single "Juicy Fruit". Mtume claimed to hold the sole copyright of these recordings, while Sony insisted that the albums were made for hire.

== Personal life and death ==
He was married 55 years to Adrienne Young, whom he named "Kamili" which means "perfect, near perfection." They met at a US Organization gathering in Los Angeles in 1966. Mtume and Kamili raised five children, and have five grandchildren. He died in South Orange, New Jersey, on January 9, 2022, at the age of 76.

== Discography ==
James Mtume's discography includes:

=== As leader ===
- Alkebu Lan: Land of the Blacks (Strata East, 1972) with the Mtume Umoja Ensemble featuring Carlos Garnett on tenor and flute, Leroy Jenkins on violin, Gary Bartz on alto and soprano sax, Stanley Cowell on piano, Buster Williams on bass, Billy Hart on drums, and Joe Lee Wilson, Eddie Micheaux, and Andy Bey on vocals, with Yusef Iman and Weusi Kuumba as poets.
- Rebirth Cycle (Third Street, 1977) featuring Jean Carn, Stanley Cowell, Dee Dee Bridgewater, Jimmy Heath, Cecil McBee, Leroy Jenkins, and Azar Lawrence.
- Kiss This World Goodbye (Epic, 1978) credited to Mtume
- In Search of the Rainbow Seekers (Epic, 1980) credited to Mtume
- Juicy Fruit (Epic, 1983) credited to Mtume
- You, Me and He (Epic, 1984) credited to Mtume
- Theater of the Mind (Epic, 1986) credited to Mtume

=== As sideman ===
With Gato Barbieri

- Under Fire (Flying Dutchman, 1973), recorded in 1971
- Bolivia (Flying Dutchman, 1973)

With Miles Davis

- On the Corner (Columbia, 1972)
- In Concert: Live at Philharmonic Hall (Columbia, 1973)
- Big Fun (Columbia, 1974)
- Get Up with It (Columbia, 1974)
- Dark Magus (Columbia, 1974)
- Agharta (Columbia, 1975)
- Pangaea (Columbia, 1976), recorded in 1975
- The Complete On the Corner Sessions (Columbia, 2007)
- Miles Davis at Newport 1955 to 1975: The Bootleg Series Vol. 4 (Columbia Legacy, 2015)

With Jimmy Heath

- The Gap Sealer (Muse, 1973)
- The Time and the Place (Landmark, 1994), recorded in 1974

With Eddie Henderson

- Heritage (Blue Note, 1976)
- Comin' Through (Capitol, 1977)
- Mahal (Capitol, 1978)

With Sonny Rollins

- Horn Culture (Milestone, 1973)
- Nucleus (Milestone, 1975)

With Pharoah Sanders

- Wisdom Through Music (Impulse!, 1973)
- Love in Us All (Impulse!, 1974)

With Buddy Terry

- Awareness (Mainstream, 1971)
- Pure Dynamite (Mainstream, 1972)

With McCoy Tyner

- Asante (Blue Note, 1974), recorded in 1970

With others

- Art Farmer, Homecoming (Mainstream, 1971)
- Carlos Garnett, Black Love (Muse, 1974)
- Albert Heath, Kawaida (O'Be, 1970), recorded in 1969
- Harold Land, A New Shade of Blue (Mainstream, 1971)
- Azar Lawrence, Bridge into the New Age (Prestige, 1974)
- Abbey Lincoln, People in Me (Philips, 1973)
- Lonnie Liston Smith, Astral Traveling (Flying Dutchman, 1973)
- James Spaulding, James Spaulding Plays the Legacy of Duke Ellington (Storyville, 1977)
- The Piano Choir, Handscapes 2 (Strata East, 1975), recorded in 1974

=== As composer ===
- "The Closer I Get to You" (1977) written with Reggie Lucas. Performed by Roberta Flack and Donny Hathaway on Blue Lights in the Basement. Atlantic Records, 1977.
- "Back Together Again" (1980) written with Reggie Lucas. Performed by Roberta Flack and Donny Hathaway also.
- The score to the 1986 movie Native Son

=== As producer (with Reggie Lucas) ===
- Stephanie Mills, What Cha' Gonna Do with My Lovin' (20th Century, 1979)
- Phyllis Hyman, You Know How to Love Me (Arista, 1979)
- Rena Scott, Come On Inside (Buddah, 1979)
- Stephanie Mills, Sweet Sensation (20th Century, 1980)
- Gary Bartz, Bartz (Arista, 1980)
- Stephanie Mills, Stephanie (20th Century, 1981)
- Marc Sadane, One Way Love Affair (Warner Bros., 1981)
- Stephanie Mills, Tantalizingly Hot (Casablanca, 1982)
- Lou Rawls, Now Is the Time (Epic, 1982)
- The Spinners, Can't Shake This Feelin' (Atlantic, 1982)
- Marc Sadane, Exciting (Warner Bros., 1982)
- The Best of Mtume & Lucas (Expansion, 2004), compilation

=== Produced by James Mtume ===
- Roy Ayers, You Might Be Surprised (Columbia Records, 1985)
- LeVert, Bloodline (Atlantic Records, 1986)
- Tyrone Brunson, The Method (MCA, 1986)
- Tawatha Agee, Welcome to My Dream (Epic, 1987)
- Nu Romance Crew, Tonight (EMI America, 1987)
- Tease, Remember (Epic, 1988)
- Sue Ann Carwell, Blue Velvet (MCA, 1988)
- Kiara, To Change and/or Make a Difference (Arista, 1989)
- Freeze Factor, Chill (Epic, 1989)
- The Comsat Angels, Falling (circa 1980)
