= Stephanie Mills discography =

This discography documents studio albums and singles released by American R&B/soul singer and songwriter Stephanie Mills.

== Albums ==
=== Studio albums ===
Year	Album	Peak chart positions					Certifications	Record label
Year	Album	US	US R&B	US Chr	US Gos	CAN	Certifications	Record label
1974	Movin' in the Right Direction	—	—	—	—	—		ABC
1975	For the First Time	—	—	—	—	—		Motown
1979	What Cha Gonna Do with My Lovin'	22	12	—	—	45	RIAA: Gold	20th Century-Fox
1980	Sweet Sensation	16	3	—	—	—	RIAA: Gold	20th Century-Fox
1981	Stephanie	30	3	—	—	—	RIAA: Gold	20th Century-Fox
1982	Love Has Lifted Me	—	—	—	—	—		Motown
1982	Tantalizingly Hot	48	10	—	—	—		Casablanca
1983	Merciless	104	12	—	—	—		Casablanca
1984	I've Got the Cure	73	10	—	—	—		Casablanca
1985	Stephanie Mills	47	4	—	—	—	RIAA: Gold	MCA
1987	If I Were Your Woman	30	1	—	—	—	RIAA: Gold	MCA
1989	Home	82	5	—	—	—	RIAA: Gold	MCA
1991	Christmas	—	—	—	—	—		MCA
1993	Something Real	—	22	—	—	—		MCA
1994	Personal Inspirations	—	—	20	8	—		GospoCentric
2004	Born for This!	—	25	—	—	—		Lightyear
"—" denotes a recording that did not chart or was not released in that territory.

=== Compilation albums ===
- In My Life: Greatest Hits (1987, Casablanca)
- The Collection (15 June 1992, Castle)
- The Best of Stephanie Mills (1995, Casablanca)
- Greatest Hits (1985–1993) (1996, MCA)
- The Best of Stephanie Mills (1997, PolyGram)
- The Ultimate Collection (1999, Hip-O)
- The Collection (1999, Spectrum)
- The Power of Love: A Ballad Collection (2000, MCA)
- 20th Century Masters - The Millennium Collection: The Best of Stephanie Mills (2000, MCA)
- Love Is to Listen - A Retrospective (2004, Expansion)
- Gold (2006, Hip-O)

== Singles ==
Year	Single	Peak chart positions										Certifications	Album
Year	Single	US	US R&B	US Dan	US A/C	AUS	CAN	IRE	NL	NZ	UK	Certifications	Album
1974	"Movin' in the Right Direction"	—	—	—	—	—	—	—	—	—	—		Movin' in the Right Direction
1974	"I Knew It Was Love"	—	—	—	—	—	—	—	—	—	—		Movin' in the Right Direction
1976	"This Empty Place"	—	—	—	—	—	—	—	—	—	—		For the First Time
1979	"What Cha Gonna Do with My Lovin'"	22	8	—	—	—	82	—	—	—	—		What Cha Gonna Do with My Lovin'
1979	"You Can Get Over"	101	55	8	—	—	—	—	—	—	—		What Cha Gonna Do with My Lovin'
1979	"Put Your Body in It"	—	—	8	—	—	—	—	—	—	—		What Cha Gonna Do with My Lovin'
1980	"Sweet Sensation"	52	3	5	—	—	—	—	—	—	—		Sweet Sensation
1980	"Never Knew Love Like This Before"	6	12	5	5	14	32	12	2	9	4	RIAA: Gold; BPI: Silver; RMNZ: Gold	Sweet Sensation
1981	"Two Hearts" (with Teddy Pendergrass)	40	3	82	—	—	—	—	—	46	49		Stephanie
1981	"Night Games"	—	33	—	—	—	—	—	—	—	—		Stephanie
1982	"Last Night"	101	14	—	—	—	—	—	—	—	—		Tantalizingly Hot
1982	"Keep Away Girls"	—	13	—	—	—	—	—	—	—	—		Tantalizingly Hot
1983	"You Can't Run from My Love"	—	59	15	—	—	—	—	—	—	—		Tantalizingly Hot
1983	"Pilot Error"	—	12	3	—	—	—	—	—	—	—		Merciless
1983	"How Come U Don't Call Me Anymore?"	—	12	—	—	—	—	—	—	—	—		Merciless
1984	"The Medicine Song"	65	8	1	—	—	—	—	21	—	29		I've Got the Cure
1984	"Edge of the Razor"	—	47	14	—	—	—	—	—	—	—		I've Got the Cure
1984	"In My Life"	—	—	—	—	—	—	—	—	—	92		I've Got the Cure
1985	"Bit by Bit (Theme from Fletch)"	78	52	15	—	—	—	—	—	—	—		Fletch
1985	"Stand Back"	—	15	7	—	—	—	—	—	—	—		Stephanie Mills
1986	"King Holiday" (with The King Dream Chorus & Holiday Crew)	—	30	—	—	—	—	—	—	—	—		—N/a
1986	"I Have Learned to Respect the Power of Love"	—	1	—	—	—	—	—	—	—	—		Stephanie Mills
1986	"Rising Desire"	—	11	—	—	—	—	—	—	—	—		Stephanie Mills
1987	"I Feel Good All Over"	—	1	—	—	—	—	—	—	—	—		If I Were Your Woman
1987	"(You're Puttin') A Rush on Me"	85	1	23	—	—	—	—	—	—	62		If I Were Your Woman
1987	"Secret Lady"	—	7	—	—	—	—	—	—	—	—		If I Were Your Woman
1988	"If I Were Your Woman"	—	19	—	—	—	—	—	—	—	—		If I Were Your Woman
1988	"Where Is the Love" (with Robert Brookins)	—	18	—	—	—	—	—	—	—	—		Let It Be Me
1989	"Something in the Way (You Make Me Feel)"	—	1	—	—	—	—	—	—	—	—		Home
1989	"Home"	—	1	—	—	—	—	—	—	—	—		Home
1990	"Comfort of a Man"	—	8	—	—	—	—	—	—	—	—		Home
1990	"Real Love"	—	53	—	—	—	—	—	—	—	—		Home
1991	"Heart to Heart" (with J.T. Taylor)	—	65	—	—	—	—	—	—	—	—		Feel the Need
1991	"This Christmas"	—	—	—	—	—	—	—	—	—	—		Christmas
1992	"All Day, All Night"	—	20	—	—	—	—	—	—	—	68		Something Real
1992	"Never Do You Wrong"	—	33	—	—	—	—	—	—	—	57		Something Real
1999	"Latin Lover"	—	—	—	—	—	—	—	—	—	—		—N/a
2001	"We Are Family" (with Various Artists)	—	—	—	—	—	—	—	—	—	—		—N/a
2003	"Can't Let Him Go"	—	—	—	—	—	—	—	—	—	—		Born for This!
2005	"Free"	—	—	—	—	—	—	—	—	—	—		Born for This!
2012	"So in Love This Christmas"	—	—	—	—	—	—	—	—	—	—		—N/a
2021	"Let's Do the Right Thing"	—	—	—	—	—	—	—	—	—	—		—N/a
"—" denotes a recording that did not chart or was not released in that territory.
