= Greatest Hits (1985–1993) =

Greatest hits album by Stephanie Mills
- Released: June 4, 1996
- Genre: R&B; pop; soul
- Length: 60:12
- Label: MCA
- Producer: Nick Martinelli, Ron Kersey; Angela Winbush, Paul Laurence, Vassal Benford, Robert Brookins; La La, Harold Faltermeyer; George Duke, LeMel Humes

Stephanie Mills chronology
Personal Inspirations (1994)	Greatest Hits (1985–1993) (1996)	Best of Stephanie Mills (1997)

Professional ratings
Review scores
Source	Rating
AllMusic	3/5 stars

Greatest Hits: 1985–1993 is a compilation album by American recording R&B singer Stephanie Mills released in 1996. This is Mills fourth hits compilation and includes most of her hit singles released from her catalog on MCA Records. The album features "Bit by Bit" theme song from Fletch and "Where Is the Love" a duet with singer Robert Brookins, a song was originally recorded by Donny Hathaway and Roberta Flack.

The hits album also includes Mills' biggest R&B charting singles: "Home", "I Feel Good All Over", "Something in the Way (You Make Me Feel)", "(You're Puttin') A Rush on Me" and "I Have Learned to Respect the Power of Love". All five singles reached number one on the Billboard R&B singles chart.

== Track listing ==
No.	Title	Writer(s)	Album	Length
1.	"Something in the Way (You Make Me Feel)"	Angela Winbush	Home	3:35
2.	"(You're Puttin') A Rush on Me"	Paul Laurence; Timmy Allen	If I Were Your Woman	5:50
3.	"I Have Learned to Respect the Power of Love"	Angela Winbush	Stephanie Mills	4:51
4.	"If I Were Your Woman"	Clay McMurray; Pamela Sawyer; Gloria Jones	If I Were Your Woman	4:36
5.	"Stand Back"	Carl Sturken and Evan Rogers	Stephanie Mills	5:09
6.	"Secret Lady"	Stephanie Mills; Howard Grate	If I Were Your Woman	5:25
7.	"I Feel Good All Over"	Gabreil Hardman; Annette Hardman	If I Were Your Woman	5:02
8.	"All Day, All Night"	Ron Spearman; Vassal Benford	Something Real	4:44
9.	"Rising Desire"	Raymond Jones	Stephanie Mills	5:56
10.	"Bit by Bit"	Fran Golde; Harold Faltermeyer	Fletch (soundtrack)	3:38
11.	"Comfort of a Man"	David Young; Dyna Brein	Home	5:50
12.	"Never Do You Wrong"	Rod Temperton; Ron Spearman; Carol Duboc	Something Real	4:46
13.	"Where Is the Love" (featuring Robert Brookins)	Ralph MacDonald; William Salter	Let It Be Me (Robert Brookins album)	5:46
14.	"Home"	Charlie Smalls	Home	5:25
