= In My Life: Greatest Hits =

Compilation album by Stephanie Mills
- Released: 1985, 1987 (re-issue)
- Recorded: 1979, 1980, 1981, 1984
- Genre: R&B; funk
- Length: 36:25
- Label: Casablanca
- Producer: James Mtume; Reggie Lucas; David Wolinski

Stephanie Mills chronology
Stephanie Mills (1985)	In My Life: Greatest Hits (1985)	If I Were Your Woman (1987)

Professional ratings
Review scores
Source	Rating
Allmusic	3/5 stars

In My Life: Greatest Hits is a compilation album by American recording R&B singer Stephanie Mills released in 1985. It is Mills first greatest hits album which features her hit charting songs, "What Cha' Gonna Do With My Lovin'", Never Knew Love Like This Before", and the top five R&B hits "Two Hearts" a duet with Teddy Pendergrass and "Sweet Sensation".

== Track listing ==
No.	Title	Writer(s)	Length
1.	"In My Life"	Keithen Carter; Pat Leonard	4:04
2.	"Put Your Body In It"	Howard King; Edward Moore	4:04
3.	"Two Hearts" (duet with Teddy Pendergrass)	Reggie Lucas; James Mtume; Tawatha Agee	4:39
4.	"Feel the Fire"	Peabo Bryson	4:53
5.	"Never Knew Love Like This Before"	Reggie Lucas; James Mtume	5:24
6.	"The Medicine Song"	David Wolinski	4:52
7.	"What Cha' Gonna Do With My Lovin'"	Reggie Lucas; James Mtume	4:01
8.	"Sweet Sensation"	Reggie Lucas; James Mtume	4:28

== Personnel ==
- Producer – David "Hawk" Wolinski (tracks: 1, 6)
- James Mtume (tracks: 2 to 5, 7, 8)
- Reggie Lucas (tracks: 2 to 5, 7, 8)

Tracks & Credits from original liner notes
