= Peggi Blu =

American singer (1946/1947–2024)

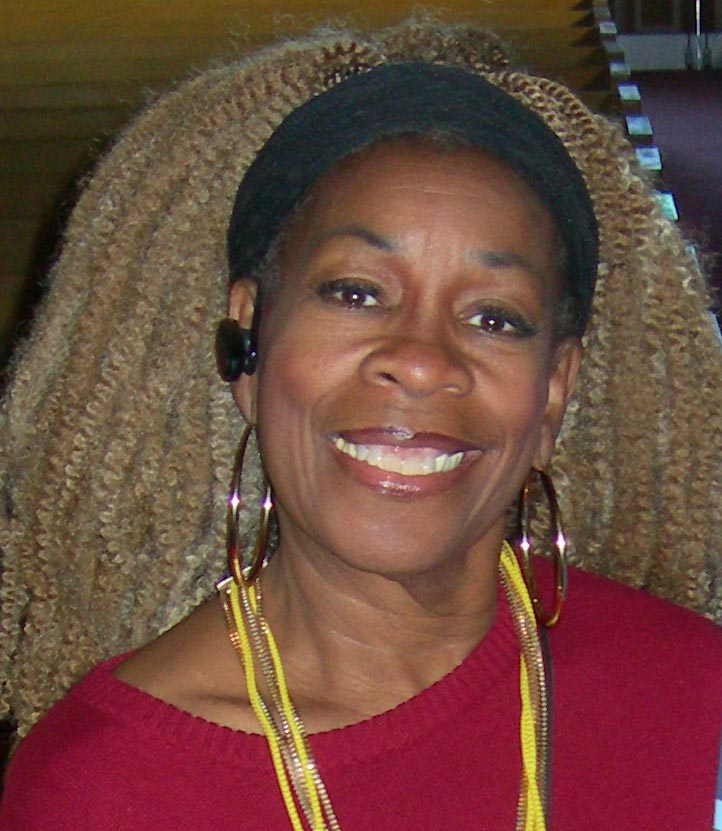
- Blu in 2013

Background information
- Also known as: Peggy Blue, Peggi Blue, Peggy Blu
- Born: Peggi Blu; May 26, 1945; Lumberton, North Carolina, U.S.
- Died: May 19, 2024 (aged 77)
- Genres: R&B; pop; disco; jazz; soul
- Occupations: Singer
- Years active: 1973–2024
- Labels: MCA; Capitol; Expansion

Peggi Blu (May 26, 1945 – May 19, 2024) was an American singer. She was the 1986 "Star Search Grand Champion (Female Vocalist)" and the winner of the 2013 Malibu Music Awards ("Vocal Coach of the Year"). She is best known as an American Idol vocal coach.

== Early life ==
Blu was born in Lumberton, North Carolina, and began singing at the age of three. A relocation to New York City at the age of 14 with her uncle Bishop Walter L. Benton and his choir opened the way to her professional career. Due to constant bookings and a demand for her vocals, she was home-schooled.

== Career ==
Blu's career as a session background singer began in 1973 with Archie Shepp's "Rest Enough (Song to Mother)", from his The Cry of My People album. Session work continued throughout the 1970s with artists such as Elkie Brooks, Esther Phillips and Louis Farrakhan.

In the mid-1970s, Blu toured with Louise Bethune and Dee Dee Kenniebrew billed as The Crystals. In 1980, she landed her first major label contract with MCA Records.

In 1987, the album Blu Blowin' produced two minor R&B/hip hop hits with "Tender Moments" and "All the Way with You".

In September 2002, Blu released her third album, Livin' on Love, on Expansion Records. In 2006, Blu was featured on the short-lived ABC TV show Miracle Workers alongside good friend Charles Valentino. In 2007, Blu did backing vocals and vocal arrangements for the soundtrack to Adam Sandler's I Now Pronounce You Chuck and Larry.

In 2010, Blu recorded with Danish/German duo Cool Million on their album Back for More, which led to her appearance on their 2012 album III. In 2011–2012, Blu was a vocal coach on American Idol.

== Death ==
Blu died on May 19, 2024, at the age of 77.

== Selected appearances discography ==
- 1973 Archie Schepp – The Cry of My People
- 1974 Lou Courtney – I'm in Need of Love
- 1976 Esther Phillips w/Beck – For All We Know
- 1977 Elkie Brooks – Two Days Away
- 1980 Minister Louis Farrakhan - Heed the Call Y'all
- 1980 Various – Fame (Original Soundtrack from the Motion Picture)
- 1982 Stephanie Mills – Tantalizingly Hot
- 1983 The Weather Girls – Success
- 1983 Stephanie Mills – Merciless
- 1985 Bob Dylan – Empire Burlesque
- 1985 Robin Clark - Surrender
- 1986 Various – Star Search the Winners Album
- 1986 Brian Setzer – The Knife Feels Like Justice
- 1986 Bob Dylan – Knocked Out Loaded
- 1987 Ronee Martin – Sensation
- 1988 Barbra Streisand – Till I Loved You
- 1988 Bob Dylan – Down in the Groove
- 1989 The Manhattans – Sweet Talk
- 1989 Quincy Jones - Back on the Block
- 1989 Tracy Chapman – Crossroads
- 1989 Various – Urban Cruising (Duet w/Bert Robinson)
- 1989 Bianca – Forever
- 1990 Thelma Houston – Throw You Down
- 1990 Kylie Minogue – Rhythm of Love
- 1990 Laura Branigan – Laura Branigan
- 1992 Leonard Cohen – The Future
- 1992 Various - Expansions Soul Sauce Vol. 1 ("Love Is the Magic")
- 1993 Young MC – What's the Flavor?
- 1993 Sonya Barry – The World Is Like a Shadow
- 1995 Melissa Manchester – If My Heart Had Wings
- 1996 Christopher Young – Set It Off (Original Motion Picture Score)
- 1999 Various – Vibrafinger
- 2002 Young MC – Engage the Enzyme
- 2004 Ron Dante – Saturday Night Blast
- 2010 Various - Christmas at Sedsoul ("The Christmas Song")
- 2010 Cool Million – Back For More ("I See You")
- 2012 Cool Million – III ("When We Loved & What About You")
- 2021 Take Me Higher – Filip Grönlund ft. Peggi Blu

== Main albums discography ==
- 1980 I Got Love (MCA Records)
- 1987 Blu Blowin' (Capitol Records)
- 2002 Livin' on Love (Expansions)
