= Born for This =

Born for This can refer to:

- "Born for This" (Paramore song), 2007 song from Riot!
- "Born for This", 2019 song by Andy Grammer
- "Born for This", 2019/2020 single by The Score
- Born for This!, 2004 album and its title track by Stephanie Mills
