= Christmas (Stephanie Mills album) =

Studio album by Stephanie Mills
- Released: October 29, 1991
- Recorded: Skip Saylor Recording and Conway Studios (Hollywood, CA); Entourage Studios (North Hollywood, CA); The Enterprise Studio and Encore Studios (Burbank, CA); Tarpan Studios (San Rafael, CA); Jay-Howard Studios and Reflections Studios (Charlotte, NC); The Bennett House (Franklin, TN); Quad Studios (Nashville, TN).
- Genre: Christmas; R&B; soul
- Length: 44:41
- Label: MCA
- Producer: Narada Michael Walden; BeBe Winans; Steve Barri; Tony Peluso; Donald Lawrence; Rodney Barber; Stephanie Mills (exec.)

Stephanie Mills chronology
Home (1989)	Christmas (1991)	Something Real (1992)

Professional ratings
Review scores
Source	Rating
AllMusic	3/5 stars

Christmas is a studio album by American recording artist Stephanie Mills, released in October 1991 on MCA Records. The album is a Christmas album, the first by Mills that showcases her soulful renditions of classic Christmas carols such as "White Christmas", "Silent Night", "Rudolph the Red-Nose Reindeer", and soul singer Donny Hathaway's "This Christmas".

== Track listing ==
No.	Title	Writer(s)	Length
1.	"This Christmas"	Donny Hathaway; Nadine McKinnor	4:53
2.	"It Doesn't Feel Like Christmas (Without You)"	Michael Price; Richard Scher	4:14
3.	"We Can Move Mountains"	Randy Kerber; Marybeth Derry	4:21
4.	"Merry Christmas"	Stephanie Mills; Narada Michael Walden	4:02
5.	"Rudolph the Red-Nosed Reindeer"	Johnny Marks	4:36
6.	"Silent Night""	Franz Xaver Gruber; Joseph Mohr	5:18
7.	"Christmas with You"	Terry Lupton; Brian Potter	4:59
8.	"Love Is to Listen"	BeBe Winans	4:24
9.	"White Christmas"	Irving Berlin	4:10
10.	"Jingle Baby"	Amanda McBroom; Tom Snow	4:09

Notes

- Track 5 contains sample from "Sex Machine" by James Brown and excerpts from "Expression" written by C. James.

== Personnel ==
- Stephanie Mills – vocals
- Donald Lawrence – keyboards (1, 5), bass (1, 5), arrangements (1, 5, 9), vocal arrangements (3, 7)
- Kevin Bond – acoustic piano solo (1), acoustic piano (2), keyboards (2)
- Richard Scher – synthesizers (2), drum programming (2), arrangements (2)
- Steve Barri – additional keyboards (2, 7, 10)
- Tony Peluso – additional keyboards (2, 7, 10), arrangements (10)
- Randy Kerber – keyboards (3, 10), arrangements (3), additional keyboards (7)
- Louis Biancaniello – keyboards (4), programming (4), orchestral arrangements (4)
- Frank Martin – acoustic piano (4)
- John Andrew Schreiner – synthesizers (7), drum programming (7), arrangements (7)
- Cedric Caldwell – keyboards (8), arrangements (8)
- Robbie Buchanan – acoustic piano solo (8)
- Dean Parks – guitars (3, 7, 10), arrangements (10)
- Tom Hemby – guitars (8)
- Neil Stubenhaus – bass (3, 10)
- Joel Smith – bass (6)
- Victor Caldwell – bass (8), drum programming (8)
- John Robinson – drums (3, 10)
- Rodney Barber – drum programming (5), first rap (5)
- Clarence "Flip" Kirby – drums (6)
- Dave Koz – alto saxophone (2), soprano saxophone (6)
- Paul McCandless – oboe (4)
- Joel Peskin – saxophone (10)
- Paul Riser – string arrangements (1, 6)
- Sephra Herman – string contractor (1, 6)
- Narada Michael Walden – arrangements (4)
- Elbernita Clark Terrell – arrangements (6)
- The company – backing vocals (1–3, 5–7, 9): Reginald Adams, Winston Bagley, Rodney Barber, Jerry Friday, Donald Lawrence, Richard Odom and Terry Phillips
- Kitty Beethoven, Nikita Germaine, Sandy Griffith, Skyler Jett and Claytoven Richardson – backing vocals (4)
- Terry Phillips – second rap (5)
- Margaret Bell, Sherrie Kibble, Angie Winans, Debra Winans, BeBe Winans and CeCe Winans – backing vocals (8)
- BeBe Winans – BGV arrangements (8)
- The Jinglettes – backing vocals (10): Liz Constantine, Bobbi Page and Terry Wood

Production

- Stephanie Mills – executive producer, producer (1–3, 5–7, 10)
- Donald Lawrence – producer (1–3, 5–7, 9)
- Steve Barri – producer (2, 3, 7, 10)
- Tony Peluso – producer (2, 3, 7, 10), recording (2, 3, 7, 10), mixing (2, 3, 7, 10)
- Richard Scher – co-producer (2)
- Narada Michael Walden – producer (4)
- Louis Biancaniello – associate producer (4)
- Rodney Barber – producer (5)
- David Floyd – recording (1, 5)
- Taavi Môte – recording (1, 5, 6, 9), mixing (1, 5)
- David Frazer – recording (4), mixing (4)
- Keith Blake – recording (7)
- Michael McCartney – recording (8)
- Elliott Peters – recording (8)
- Billy Whittington – recording (8)
- Mark Williams – recording (9)
- Mick Guzauski – mixing (6, 9)
- Ronnie Brookshire – mixing (8)
- G. Aaron Miller – recording assistant (1, 5, 7, 9)
- Fred Kelly – recording assistant (7, 10)
- Brett Perry – assistant engineer (8)
- Roy Snowdon – assistant engineer (8)
- Carry Summers – assistant engineer (8)
- Tracey Schroeder – recording assistant (9)
- Marc Reyburn – additional recording (4)
- Steve Hall – mastering at Future Disc (Hollywood, California)
- Left Bank Management – project coordinator
- Mark Sullivan – production coordinator (1–3, 5–7, 9, 10)
- Janice Lee, Kelly McRae, Cynthia Shiloh and Kevin Walden – production coordination (4)
- Louis Upkins Jr. – production assistant (8)
- Larry Brooks at Kosh Brooks Design – art direction, design
- Todd Gray – photography
