= Do You Love Him? =

Do You Love Him? may refer to:

- "Do You Love Him", a 1965 song by Cliff Bennett and the Rebel Rousers
- "Do You Love Him?", a song by Stephanie Mills from the 1983 album Merciless
- "Do You Love Him?", a 2016 single by Countess Vaughn
- "Do You Love Him?", a track composed by Rachel Portman performed by Quartetto Gelato for the 1994 film Only You
