= Rough Trade =

Rough Trade may refer to:

- Rough Trade (shops), London record stores
- Rough Trade Records, a record label from the stores
  - Rough Trade Books, a publishing house from the label
- Rough Trade (band), a Canadian new wave rock band
- "Rough Trade" (American Dad!), an episode of American Dad!
- Rough trade (slang), a gay slang term
- "Rough Trade", a song by Stephanie Mills from the album I've Got the Cure
