= Movin' in the Right Direction =

Studio album by Stephanie Mills
- Released: October 28, 1974
- Recorded: 1974
- Studio: Mediasound, New York City
- Genre: Soul
- Label: ABC
- Producer: Eddie Deane

Stephanie Mills chronology
Movin' in the Right Direction (1974)	For the First Time (1975)

Professional ratings
Review scores
Source	Rating
AllMusic	2.5/5 stars

Movin' in the Right Direction is the debut album by Stephanie Mills released in 1974 on the ABC Records label. It was arranged by Bert Keyes.

== Track listing ==
Side one
No.	Title	Writer(s)	Length
1.	"Movin' in the Right Direction"	Eddie V. Deane; Bert Keyes	2:50
2.	"Of All the Things"	Pat Holley	3:35
3.	"I'll Never Love Nobody Else but You"	Truman Thomas	2:42
4.	"My Baby's Melody"	Holley	3:05
5.	"Sweet Salvation"	Holley	2:50
6.	"Home" (from the Broadway Musical The Wiz)	Charles Smalls	2:32

Side two
No.	Title	Writer(s)	Length
7.	"I Knew It Was Love"	Keyes; Holley	3:03
8.	"You Do It to Me"	Francine Greshler Feldmann	3:05
9.	"I Don't Want to Go Back"	Keyes; Richard Ahlert	2:40
10.	"Danny Boy"	Frederic Weatherly	3:32
11.	"Somewhere Over the Rainbow"	Harold Arlen; Edgar Y. Harburg	3:06

== Personnel ==
- Stephanie Mills - vocals
- Bob Rose, Jeff Mironov - guitar
- Bob Kreinar - bass
- Paul Griffin - keyboards
- Bert Keyes - keyboards, arrangements
- Herschel Dwellingham - drums
- Anthony Hinton, Diane Sumler, Elaine Clark, Hattie Campell, Joey Mills, Julia Stewart, Luther Vandross, Vandetta Jackson - backing vocals
