= Gabriel Hardeman =

American musical artist (1943–2012)

- Also known as: Gabriel S. Hardeman Jr.
- Born: Gabriel S. Hardeman; December 13, 1943; Atlanta, Georgia
- Died: June 23, 2012 (aged 68) Philadelphia, Pennsylvania
- Genres: Christian R&B, gospel, traditional black gospel, contemporary R&B, urban contemporary gospel, soul
- Occupations: Singer, songwriter, pianist
- Instruments: Vocals, singer-songwriter, piano
- Years active: 1976–2001
- Labels: Savoy, Crystal Rose, Birthright

Gabriel S. Hardeman Jr. (December 13, 1943 – June 23, 2012), was an American gospel musician, pianist, and leader of the Gabriel Hardeman Delegation that included his wife Annette. He started his music career in 1976, with the release of Gabriel Hardeman Delegation by Savoy Records. Along with his wife, they formed Birthright Records, and in 1981 they released the album Talk along with Feels Like Fire in 1983. His fourth album, To the Chief Musician, released in 2001 by Crystal Rose Records, and this placed at No. 12 on the Billboard magazine Gospel Albums chart. Hardeman was a noted songwriter along with his wife Annette of such songs as 1987's "I Feel Good All Over" by Stephanie Mills and "Love Under New Management" performed by Miki Howard in 1989.

== Early life ==
Hardeman was born on December 13, 1943, in Atlanta, Georgia, as Gabriel S. Hardeman Jr., the son of Reverend Gabriel S. Hardeman Sr, who pastored and founded the Hickman Temple A.M.E. Church in West Philadelphia, and his mother, Daisy. Hardeman was a pianist at his fathers church as a youth. He graduated from High School at William Penn High School, and he went onto graduate from West Virginia State University with a physical education bachelor's degree, where he was a football player and a glee club participant. Subsequently, in 1990, he went to Lutheran Theological Seminary, where he graduated with a master's degree in divinity and became a minister in 1995.

== Music career ==
He began his music recording career in 1976, with the release of Gabriel Hardeman Delegation by Savoy Records, yet this did not chart. His subsequent two albums were released by the label he and his wife started, Birthright Records, and they released in 1981, Talk, along with 1983's, Feels Like Fire. The next album, To the Chief Musician, was released on May 8, 2001, and it placed on the Billboard magazine Gospel Albums at No. 12.

Gabriel alongside his wife, Annette, were co-writers on two commercially successful songs, such as 1987's "I Feel Good All Over" by Stephanie Mills and "Love Under New Management" by Miki Howard in 1989. Gabriel alone wrote songs on some Teddy Pendergrass albums, Joy in 1988 and 1991's Truly Blessed.

== Personal life ==
From the late 1980s until their departure for Georgia, Hardeman was a physical education instructor and coached softball at Strawberry Mansion Junior High School. He directed and wrote songs for the Strawberry Mansion Gospel Ensemble. He also worked at South Philadelphia High School. In 2000, Hardeman relocated to Aragon, Georgia, so that he could pastor at Bellview A.M.E. Church.

Hardeman was married to his wife, Annette, at the time of his death on June 23, 2012, at Presbyterian Hospital in Philadelphia, from Interstitial lung disease that he was diagnosed with in 2000. Annette was born on November 19, 1954, in Chester, Pennsylvania. The couple had a son, Michael.

== Discography ==
List of selected studio albums, with selected chart positions
Title	Album details	Peak chart positions
Title	Album details	US Gos
Gabriel Hardeman Delegation	Released: 1976; Label: Savoy; CD, digital download	–
Talk	Released: 1981; Label: Birthright; CD, digital download	–
Feels Like Fire	Released: 1983; Label: Birthright; CD, digital download	–
To the Chief Musician	Released: May 8, 2001; Label: Birthright; CD, digital download	12
