= Love Has Lifted Me =

Studio album by Stephanie Mills
- Released: November 17, 1982
- Recorded: 1975
- Genre: Soul
- Label: Motown Records
- Producer: Michael Sutton and Harold Johnson (tracks 1, 3, 7, 8), Phillip Bailey (track 2), Don Daniels (track 4), Hal David & Burt Bacharach (track 5), Michael L. Smith (track 6)

Stephanie Mills chronology
Tantalizingly Hot (1982)	Love Has Lifted Me (1982)	Merciless (1983)

Professional ratings
Review scores
Source	Rating
AllMusic	1.5/5 stars

Love Has Lifted Me is an album by Stephanie Mills. The album was originally recorded in 1975 after For the First Time was released, but was not released until 1982.

== Track listing ==
Side one
No.	Title	Writer(s)	Length
1.	"Love Has Lifted Me"	Michael Sutton; Brenda Sutton	5:35
2.	"Love is Everywhere"	Douglas Gibbs; Steven J. Hunt; Ron Crowder	4:00
3.	"I Don't Want to Be Reminded"	Harold Johnson	3:33
4.	"You are the Melody of My Life"	Terri McFaddin	4:06

Side two
No.	Title	Writer(s)	Length
1.	"This Empty Place"	Burt Bacharach; Hal David	3:01
2.	"I Hope We Don't Run Out of Music"	Michael L. Smith	3:40
3.	"The Kingdom Within Everyone My Life"	M. Sutton; B. Sutton	4:24
4.	"Simple Masterpiece"	M. Sutton; B. Sutton	4:36

== Credits ==
- Cover [Concept], Concept [Album] – Simone Sheffield, Schuyler Traughber
- Arranger – Art Wright, Reggie Andrews, Dale Warren, Kenny Asher
- Design – Anne Garner
- Mastering – John Matousek
- Photography – Kent McVey
