= Born for This! =

Studio album by Stephanie Mills
- Released: August 3, 2004
- Length: 41:39
- Label: Lightyear
- Producer: Michael J. Allen; Gordon Chambers; Barry J. Eastmond; Eddie F; Ryan Leslie; Darryl McClary; Stephanie Mills (exec.); Bebe Winans

Stephanie Mills chronology
Personal Inspirations (1994)	Born for This! (2004)

Born for This! is a studio album by American singer Stephanie Mills. It was released by Lightyear Entertainment on August 3, 2004 in the United States. The album features re-arranged productions of Mills's hit songs such as "Never Knew Love Like This Before" and "Something in the Way (You Make Me Feel)" as well as new songs she had not recorded before. It debuted and peaked at number 25 on the US Top R&B/Hip-Hop Albums.

== Critical reception ==
Professional ratings
Review scores
Source	Rating
AllMusic	3/5 stars

In his review for AllMusic, editor Andy Kellman called the album a "solid album of contemporary R&B, most of which differs thematically (i.e., heartbreak, devotion, romance) from 1995's gospel-oriented Personal Inspirations. Surrounded by associates of Whitney Houston, Faith Evans, and Will Downing, Mills has made an album of mostly subdued and lightly upbeat material that will please her grown-up fan base. Mills is in such fine, with-the-times form that you could be fooled into thinking that she never went away."

== Track listing ==
No.	Title	Writer(s)	Producer(s)	Length
1.	"Can't Let Him Go"	Barry Eastmond; Gordon Chambers; Stephanie Mills	Eastmond; Chambers	4:09
2.	"Never Knew Love Like This"	Darryl McClary; Chambers; Michael Allen	McClary; Allen	3:21
3.	"Healing Time"	McClary; Chambers; Allen	McClary; Allen	3:39
4.	"Love of My Life"	McClary; Chambers; Allen	McClary; Allen	4:01
5.	"Free"	Darren Lighty; Edward Ferrell; Mills	McClary; Eddie F	4:26
6.	"For U"	McClary; Chambers; Allen; Juan Peter; Quincy Patrick; Mills	McClary; Allen	4:03
7.	"You Still Mean So Much"	Ryan Leslie	Leslie	4:52
8.	"Something in the Way"	Angela Winbush	Lighty	4:02
9.	"Baby Love"	Donald Woolfolk; Chamber; Mills	Eastmond; Chambers	4:04
10.	"Born for This"	BeBe Winans	Winans	4:53

== Charts ==
Chart (2004)	Peak position
US Top R&B/Hip-Hop Albums (Billboard)	25
