= The Medicine Song =

Single by Stephanie Mills

from the album I've Got the Cure
- Released: 1984
- Genre: R&B; soul; dance
- Length: 4:52
- Label: Casablanca Records
- Songwriter: David "Hawk" Wolinski
- Producer: David "Hawk" Wolinski

Stephanie Mills singles chronology
"How Come U Don't Call Me Anymore" (1983)	"The Medicine Song" (1984)	"Stand Back" (1985)

"The Medicine Song" is a 1984 single by Stephanie Mills. It gave Mills her first number one dance chart hit; her previous entry on the chart had been "Pilot Error", which had made it to number three.

"The Medicine Song" stayed at the top spot on the dance chart for one week. The single was her fourth entry to make the top 10 on the Soul singles chart, peaking at number eight. It also charted on the Billboard Hot 100, and was a top 30 hit in the UK.

== Track listing and formats ==
- US 12" Vinyl single

A. "The Medicine Song" – 6:30
B. "The Medicine Song" (Dub Version) – 5:49

- UK 7" Vinyl single

A. "The Medicine Song" – 6:30
B. "The Medicine Song" (Instrumental) – 4:01

- Netherlands 12" Vinyl single

A. "The Medicine Song" (Extended Dance Version) – 6:30
B. "The Medicine Song" (Dub Version) – 5:49

== Charts ==
=== Weekly charts ===
Chart (1984)	Peak position
Belgium (Ultratop 50 Flanders)	21
Netherlands (Dutch Top 40)	8
Netherlands (Single Top 100)	21
UK Singles (OCC)	29
US Billboard Hot 100	65
US Dance Club Songs (Billboard)	1
US Hot R&B/Hip-Hop Songs (Billboard)	8

=== Year-end charts ===
Chart (1984)	Position
Netherlands (Dutch Top 40)	83
