= I Feel Good All Over =

Single by Stephanie Mills

from the album If I Were Your Woman
- Released: 1987
- Genre: R&B; soul
- Length: 5:02
- Label: MCA (5669)
- Songwriters: Annette Hardeman; Gabriel Hardeman
- Producer: Nick Martinelli

Stephanie Mills singles chronology
"I Have Learned to Respect the Power of Love" (1986)	"I Feel Good All Over" (1987)	"(You're Puttin') A Rush on Me" (1987)

"I Feel Good All Over" is a song recorded by American singer-songwriter Stephanie Mills, released in 1987 by MCA Records. The single was her second number one on the Hot Black Singles chart and first number one in 1987. The single spent three weeks at the top spot. However, despite holding "I Wanna Dance with Somebody (Who Loves Me)" by Whitney Houston, a number one pop single, off that top spot for the first two of those three weeks, the single did not make the Billboard Hot 100.

In 1988, Patti LaBelle admitted that she had been given a chance to record the song by the song's writers, Rev. Gabriel Hardeman and his wife Annette, the latter of whom was one of LaBelle's backup singers at the time, but she passed on it because she didn't believe it was a "Patti" song: "When I heard Miss Thing (Mills) sing it and everything was right, I said, 'Patti', and slapped myself...I blew that one."

== Track listing and formats ==
- US 7" Vinyl single

A. "I Feel Good All Over" – 4:13
B. "I Feel Good All Over" (Suite) – 4:13

== Personnel ==
- Executive Producer – Cassandra Mills, Stephanie Mills
- Mastered By – Steve Hall
- Engineer – Hill Swimmer
- Producer – Nick Martinelli
- Written By – Annette Hardeman, Gabriel Hardeman
- Management – Starlight Music, Inc.

== Charts ==
Chart (1987)	Peak position
US Hot R&B/Hip-Hop Songs (Billboard)	1
