= Terry Lupton =

Terry Martin Lupton is a successful songwriter and producer based in Los Angeles.

His songwriting catalogue include almost 100 commercially published songs, due to the databases of BMI and ASCAP.

== His work ==
He wrote songs for the following artists:

- 1988 on the album "Apollonia" by Apollonia Kotero
- 1989 on the album "The Party" by The Party
- 1991 on the album "Michael Learns to Rock" by Michael Learns to Rock
- 1992 on the album "Something Real" by Stephanie Mills
- 1993 on the album "Joey Lawrence" by Joey Lawrence
- 2000 on the album "Steamin'" by Scott Ellison
- 2003 on the album "Bad Case of the Blues" by Scott Ellison
- 2004 on the album "Everyday's Another Chance" by Jamie Stevens
- 2005 on the album "All The Girls I Am" by Jeannie Kendall
- the song "Shine em up" by Keely Hawkes on the album "Shake it up"
