= Reggie Lucas =

American guitarist and record producer (1953–2018)

- Born: Reginald Grant Lucas; February 25, 1953; New York City, U.S.
- Died: May 19, 2018 (aged 65) New York City, U.S.
- Genres: Jazz, soul, disco, R&B, pop
- Occupations: Music producer, musician, songwriter
- Instrument: Guitar
- Years active: 1970–2018
- Formerly of: MFSB; Miles Davis; Madonna; Mtume; Stephanie Mills
- Website: reggielucas.com

Reginald Grant Lucas (February 25, 1953 – May 19, 2018) was an American guitarist, songwriter and record producer. Lucas is best known for producing the majority of Madonna's 1983 self-titled debut album, and for playing rhythm guitar with the Miles Davis electric band during the first half of the 1970s. He received a Grammy award for Best R&B Song.

== Early life ==
Lucas was born on February 25, 1953, in Flushing, Queens, New York. He attended the Bronx High School of Science, but dropped out to focus on his music.

== Career ==
Early in his career, Lucas was an R&B and jazz guitarist, playing with Billy Paul in the early 1970s and then with Miles Davis from 1972 to 1976. It was in Davis' electric band (one that included Pete Cosey, Michael Henderson and Al Foster) that Lucas met percussionist James Mtume, who would later become his production partner. The two joined singer Roberta Flack's band in 1976, and toured with her for several years.

Following his stint as a touring jazz guitarist, Lucas shifted his focus to songwriting and producing, where he gained both fame and critical praise. The production team of Lucas and Mtume would write and produce hits for a number of artists, including Stephanie Mills, Phyllis Hyman, Lou Rawls, The Spinners and Roberta Flack.

As the 1970s came to a close, Lucas branched out and began to write and produce material on his own. In addition to his own instrumental record Survival Themes (1976), one of his first solo projects was Madonna's 1983 self-titled debut album, including the song "Borderline". Lucas produced the majority of the album, which sold more than five million copies.

Lucas later worked with Rebbie Jackson, Randy Crawford, and The Four Tops on his own. The Four Tops' 1985 Magic, included the single "Sexy Ways" and "Maybe Tomorrow", a duet between Levi Stubbs and Phyllis Hyman. Lucas was also a member of the short-lived group Sunfire, who released one album in 1982. Lucas produced their single "Young, Free and Single".

In 1986, Lucas founded the Jersey City recording studio Quantum Sound. Clients of the studio included the Pet Shop Boys, Jodeci, Jeff Buckley and Sepultura.

== Personal life and death ==
Lucas's daughter, Lisa Lucas, was the executive director of the National Book Foundation and is now the publisher of Pantheon and Schocken Books.

His son, Julian, is a staff writer for The New Yorker.

A longtime resident of Montclair, New Jersey, Lucas died of heart disease in New York City, at the age of 65.

== Awards and honors ==
In the 1981 Grammy Awards, Lucas and James Mtume won a Best R&B Song for their composition "Never Knew Love Like This Before", which was performed by Stephanie Mills.

== Discography ==
=== As producer ===
- Madonna – Madonna (Sire, 1983)
- Models – Out of Mind, Out of Sight (Mushroom, 1985)
- The Four Tops – Magic (1985, Motown, 1985)
- Randy Crawford – Abstract Emotions (Warner Bros., 1986)
- Rebbie Jackson – Reaction (Columbia, 1986)
- Bunny DeBarge – In Love (Motown, 1987)
- John Adams – Strong (A&M, 1987)
- Elisa Fiorillo – Elisa Fiorillo (Chrysalis, 1987)
- The Weather Girls – The Weather Girls (Columbia, 1988)
- Nick Scotti – Nick Scotti (Reprise, 1993)

=== As producer with James Mtume ===
- Stephanie Mills – What Cha' Gonna Do with My Lovin' (20th Century, 1979)
- Phyllis Hyman – You Know How to Love Me (Arista, 1979)
- Rena Scott – Come On Inside (Buddah, 1979)
- Stephanie Mills – Sweet Sensation (20th Century, 1980)
- Gary Bartz – Bartz (Arista, 1980)
- Stephanie Mills – Stephanie (20th Century, 1981)
- Marc Sadane – One Way Love Affair (Warner Bros., 1981)
- Stephanie Mills – Tantalizingly Hot (Casablanca, 1982)
- Lou Rawls – Now Is The Time (Epic, 1982)
- The Spinners – Can't Shake This Feeling (Atlantic, 1981)
- Marc Sadane – Exciting (Warner Bros., 1982)
- The Best of Mtume & Lucas (Expansion, 2004) – compilation

=== As composer ===
- Roberta Flack and Donny Hathaway – "The Closer I Get to You" (written by Reggie Lucas and James Mtume) on Blue Lights in the Basement (Atlantic, 1978)
- Stephanie Mills – What Cha Gonna Do with My Lovin' (20th Century Fox, 1979)
- Phyllis Hyman – "You Know How to Love Me" (1979)
- Roberta Flack and Donny Hathaway – "Back Together Again" (1980)
- Stephanie Mills – "Never Knew Love Like This Before" on Sweet Sensation (20th Century Fox, 1980)
- Madonna – "Borderline" and "Physical Attraction" on Madonna (Sire, 1983)

=== As leader ===
- Survival Themes (East Wind, 1976)
- Sunfire (Warner Bros., 1982)

=== As sideman ===
With Miles Davis

- In Concert: Live at Philharmonic Hall (Columbia, 1973)
- Dark Magus (CBS Sony, 1974)
- Get Up With It (Columbia, 1974)
- Agharta (CBS Sony, 1975)
- Pangaea (CBS Sony, 1976)
- The Complete Miles Davis at Montreux (Columbia, 2002) - 1973 only
- The Complete On the Corner Sessions (Columbia, 2007)
- Miles Davis at Newport 1955-1975: The Bootleg Series Vol. 4 (Columbia Legacy, 2015)

With Carlos Garnett

- Black Love (Muse, 1974)
- Journey to Enlightenment (Muse, 1974)
- Let This Melody Ring On (Muse, 1975)

With Norman Connors

- Slewfoot (Buddah, 1974)
- Saturday Night Special (Buddah, 1975)
- Romantic Journey (Buddah, 1977)
- Aquarian Dream (Buddah, 1976) - arranger

With others

- Babatunde Olatunji – Soul Makossa (Paramount, 1973)
- Vitamin E – Sharing (Buddah, 1977) - arranger
- Flora Purim – Nothing Will Be As It Was... Tomorrow (Warner Bros., 1977)
- Lonnie Liston Smith – Visions of a New World (Flying Dutchman, 1975)
- Hubert Eaves – Esoteric Funk (East Wind, 1979)
- Roberta Flack – Blue Lights in the Basement (Atlantic, 1977)
- Roberta Flack – Roberta Flack Featuring Donny Hathaway (Atlantic, 1980)
- Urszula Dudziak – Urszula (Arista, 1975)
- James Mtume – Rebirth Cycle (Third Street, 1977)
- Gary Bartz – The Shadow Do (Prestige, 1975)
- Zbigniew Seifert – Zbigniew Seifert (Capitol, 1977)
- John Lee/Gerry Brown – Still Can't Say Enough (Blue Note, 1976)
- Masabumi Kikuchi's Kochi – Wishes (East Wind, 1976)
- Shunzo Ohno – Bubbles (East Wind, 1976)
