= Two Hearts (Stephanie Mills song) =

- Side A of the US single

Single by Stephanie Mills and Teddy Pendergrass

from the album Stephanie
- B-side: "I Just Wanna Say"
- Released: January 1981
- Recorded: 1980
- Genre: R&B, soul
- Length: 3:29 (7" Single); 4:44 (Album Version); 6:00 (12" Single)
- Label: 20th Century-Fox Records; Philadelphia International Records
- Songwriters: James Mtume; Tawatha Agee; Reggie Lucas
- Producers: James Mtume; Reggie Lucas

Stephanie Mills singles chronology
"Never Knew Love Like This Before" (1980)	"Two Hearts" (1981)	"Last Night" (1982)

Teddy Pendergrass singles chronology
"Love T.K.O." (1980)	"Two Hearts" (1981)	"I Can't Live Without Your Love" (1981)

Music video
- "Two Hearts" on YouTube

"Two Hearts'" is a hit duet sung by American R&B singers Stephanie Mills and Teddy Pendergrass, from Mills' fifth studio album Stephanie (1981). The song was written and produced by James Mtume, Reggie Lucas and Tawatha Agee. Released in January 1981, the single reached number 40 on the US Billboard Hot 100 in 1981. On the US Billboard R&B chart, "Two Hearts" reached number three.

== Track listing and formats ==
- US 7" Vinyl single

A. "Two Hearts" – 3:29
B. "I Just Wanna Say" – 6:09

- US 12" Vinyl single

A. "Two Hearts" (Club Mix) – 6:11
B. "I Just Wanna Say" – 6:06

- UK 12" Vinyl single

A. "Two Hearts" (12" Version) – 6:00
B. "I Just Wanna Say" – 6:06

== Charts ==
=== Weekly charts ===
Chart (1981)	Peak position
New Zealand (Recorded Music NZ)	46
UK Singles (OCC)	49
US Billboard Hot 100	40
US Hot R&B/Hip-Hop Songs (Billboard)	3
US Dance Club Songs (Billboard)	82
