= Something Real (Stephanie Mills album) =

Studio album by Stephanie Mills
- Released: November 24, 1992
- Studios: Oasis, Canoga Park, California; Reflection, Charlotte, North Carolina; Sigma Sound, New York City
- Genres: R&B; soul
- Length: 54:44
- Label: MCA
- Producers: Steve Barri; Dave "Jam" Hall; Donald Lawrence; Tony Peluso; Stephanie Mills (exec.)

Stephanie Mills chronology
Christmas (1991)	Something Real (1992)	Personal Inspirations (1994)

Singles from Something Real
- 1. "All In How Much We Give" Released: June 1992; 2. "All Day, All Night" Released: November 17, 1992; 3. "Never Do You Wrong" Released: April 1993

Professional ratings
Review scores
Source	Rating
AllMusic	2.5/5 stars

Something Real is the thirteenth studio album by American recording R&B artist Stephanie Mills. It was released by MCA Records on November 24, 1992. Her final recording with the music label, the album peaked at number 22 on the US Top R&B Albums chart. Its lead single "All Day, All Night" reached the top 20 on the Hot R&B Singles chart. The song "All In How Much We Give" was written for the animated musical adventure comedy film Tom and Jerry: The Movie (1992).

== Track listing ==
No.	Title	Writer(s)	Producer(s)	Length
1.	"Never Do You Wrong"	Rod Temperton; Carol Duboc; Vassal Benford	Benford	4:46
2.	"All Day, All Night"	Ron Spearman; Benford	Benford	4:44
3.	"Somewhere in This Broken Heart"	Mark Holden; Michael Price; Steve Legassick	Steve Barri; Tony Peluso	4:56
4.	"Stone Cold Woman"	Terry Lupton; Brian Potter	Barri; Peluso	4:20
5.	"Love the Hurt Away"	Donald Lawrence; Narada Michael Walden; Stephanie Mills	Lawrence	4:29
6.	"Heartache"	Jonathan Rosen; Karen Manno	Barri; Peluso	4:20
7.	"Policy of Love"	Holden; Kenny Harris	Barri; Peluso	4:54
8.	"I Found a New Love"	David A. Reppace; Flip Kirby; Mills	Barri; Peluso; Mills	4:54
9.	"All in How Much We Give"	Jody Davidson	Barri; Peluso	3:27
10.	"24-Hour Woman"	Lawrence; Mills	Lawrence	5:20
11.	"Never Gonna Give You Up"	Joel Davis; Mills	Barri; Peluso; Mills	5:10
12.	"I Just Want Love"	Cydne Monet; Eddie F; James Preston	Dave "Jam" Hall	4:02

== Personnel ==
Adapted from album booklet.

- Co-producer – Stephanie Mills (tracks: 5, 10), Steve Legassick (tracks: 3)
- Executive-Producer – Stephanie Mills
- Mastered By – Steve Hall
- Drums – Bronek (tracks: 7), Rodney Barber (tracks: 10)
- Guitar – Brian Ray (tracks: 3), Eric Brice (tracks: 5), Dean Parks (tracks: 7), [Rhythm Guitar] - Marlon McClain (tracks: 8)
- Backing Vocals – Alexandra Brown, Lorraine Perry, Tonya Kelly (tracks: 1–2), Donald Lawrence, Reginald Adams, Richard Odom, Rodney Barber, Terry Phillips (tracks: 3–5), Donald Lawrence, Reginald Adams, Richard Odom, Rodney Barber, Stephanie Mills, Terry Phillips, Terry Wood, Tonya Harris (tracks: 6–8), Donald Lawrence, Reginald Adams, Richard Odom, Terry Phillips (tracks: 10, 11), Terri Robinson (tracks:12)
- Saxophone – Gerald Albright (tracks: 2), Dave Koz (tracks: 6, 11)
- Bass – James McKay (tracks: 10)
- Keyboards – Jeff Lorber (tracks: 6, 8, 9, 11), Kevin Bond (tracks: 5, 10)
- Mixed By – Donald Lawrence (tracks: 5, 10), Elliott Peters (tracks: 12), Rodney Barber (tracks: 5, 10), Tony Peluso (tracks: 3, 4, 5, 6, 7, 8, 9, 10, 11), Victor Flores (tracks: 1, 2)
- Producer – Dave "Jam" Hall (tracks: 12), Donald Lawrence (tracks: 5, 10), Kenny Harris (tracks: 7), Stephanie Mills (tracks: 8, 11), Steve Barri (tracks: 3, 4, 6–9, 11), Tony Peluso (tracks: 3, 4, 6–9, 11), Vassal Benford (tracks: 1, 2)
- Recorded By – David Kennedy (tracks: 12), Mark Williams (2) (tracks: 5, 10), Tony Peluso (tracks: 3, 4, 5, 6, 7, 8, 9, 10, 11), Tracy Schnieder (tracks: 5, 10), Victor Flores (tracks: 1, 2)
- Recorded By [Additional] – Bobby Brooks (tracks: 3), Jeff Lorber (tracks: 6, 8, 9, 11)

== Charts ==
Chart (1992)	Peak position
US Top R&B/Hip-Hop Albums (Billboard)	22

=== Singles ===
Year	Single	Chart positions		
Year	Single	US Pop	US R&B	UK
1992	"All in How Much We Give"	—	—	—
1992	"All Day, All Night"	—	20	68
1993	"Never Do You Wrong"	—	30	57
