= Tantalizingly Hot =

Studio album by Stephanie Mills
- Released: July 17, 1982
- Genre: Soul
- Label: Casablanca
- Producer: James Mtume; Reggie Lucas; Ashford & Simpson

Stephanie Mills chronology
Stephanie (1981)	Tantalizingly Hot (1982)	Love Has Lifted Me (1982)

Singles from Tantalizing Hot
- 1. "Last Night" Released: 1982; 2. "Keep Away Girls" Released: 1982; 3. "You Can't Run from My Love" Released: 1983

Professional ratings
Review scores
Source	Rating
AllMusic	2.5/5 stars

Tantalizingly Hot is the sixth album by American recording artist Stephanie Mills, released in 1982 and was produced by James Mtume & Reggie Lucas and Ashford & Simpson. It was her first release, by default, on Casablanca Records. In 1981, oil magnate and industrialist Marvin Davis (1925–2004) and financier Marc Rich (1934–2013) bought Twentieth Century-Fox Film Corporation, which owned her previous label, 20th Century-Fox Records, for a grand total of $703 million.

However, Davis expressed disinterest in buying the record company and thus sold the record label to PolyGram earlier that year. PolyGram, a European conglomerate that was buying up US record labels as fast as they could make deals, immediately shut down the label and had all of its artists' contracts and reissues (including Mills') transferred to their Casablanca imprint, which they had owned since owning 50% of the company in 1977. (PolyGram bought the other 50% in 1980, the same year Mills recorded the LP Sweet Sensation).

== Track listing ==
All songs produced by James Mtume and Reggie Lucas except where indicated.

No.	Title	Writer(s)	Producer(s)	Length
1.	"Last Night"	Mtume; Lucas		4:27
2.	"Still Lovin' You"	Dean Gant; Imari Amani		4:18
3.	"Keep Away Girls"	Nickolas Ashford; Valerie Simpson	Ashford & Simpson	4:52
4.	"You Can't Run from My Love"	Mtume; Lucas		4:14
5.	"True Love Don't Come Easy"	Edward Moore; James Balton		3:00
6.	"'Ole Love"	Joey Mills; V. Eaglyn	Stephanie Mills	4:45
7.	"Your Love Is Always New"	Jim Andron; Mark Winkler		3:03
8.	"I Can't Give Back the Love I Feel for You"	Brian Holland; Ashford; Simpson	Ashford & Simpson	4:53

- "Last Night" was released as the first single with the track "Wailin'" (written by Roxanne Seeman, Alan Phillips, Franne Golde and produced by James Mtume & Reggie Lucas) on the B-side.

== Personnel ==
- Howard King (1, 2, 4, 5, 7), Kenneth Little (6), Raymond Calhoun (1, 2, 4, 5, 7), Yogi Horton (3, 8) – drums
- Al McKay (1, 2, 4, 5, 7), Doc Powell (3, 8), Edward Moore (1, 2, 4, 6, 7), Reggie Lucas (1, 2, 4, 5, 7), Ted Perlman (2) – guitar
- Bobby Wooten (6), Dean Gant (1, 2, 4, 5, 7), Harry Whitaker (1, 2, 4, 5, 7), Richard Tee (1, 2, 4, 5, 7) – keyboards
- Ashford & Simpson, Brenda White, Fonzi Thornton, Josie Armstead, Tawatha Agee, John Simmons, Mary Johnson, Norma Jean Wright, Peggy Blue, Ullanda McCullough – backing vocals
- John Simmons (4) (6), Valerie Simpson (3, 8) – piano
- Bernie Worrell (1, 2, 4, 5, 7), Bobby Wooten (6), Dean Gant (1, 2, 4, 6, 7), Ed Walsh (3, 8), Joseph Joubert (3, 8), Pete Cannarozzi (1, 2, 4, 5, 7) – synthesizer

Technical

- Cassandra Mills, Stephanie Mills – album concept
- Stephanie Mills – executive producer
- Jim "Doc" Dougherty – engineer
- John Potokia – assistant engineer
- Carla Bandini – additional engineer
- Ted Jensen – mastering

Credits from album liner notes.

== Charts ==
Chart (1982)	Peak position
US Billboard 200	48
US Top R&B/Hip-Hop Albums (Billboard)	10

=== Singles ===
Year	Single	Chart positions		
Year	Single	US Pop	US R&B	US Dance
1982	"Last Night"	100	14	—
1982	"Keep Away Girls"	—	13	—
1983	"You Can't Run from My Love"	—	59	15
