= Stephanie (album) =

Studio album by Stephanie Mills
- Released: April 22, 1981
- Recorded: 1980–1981
- Studio: Sigma Sound, New York City
- Genre: R&B; post-disco; soul
- Label: 20th Century Fox (USA); RCA (Australia), (Germany), (Spain)
- Producer: James Mtume; Reggie Lucas

Stephanie Mills chronology
Sweet Sensation (1980)	Stephanie (1981)	Tantalizingly Hot (1982)

Singles from Stephanie
- 1. "Two Hearts" Released: 1981; 2. "Night Games" Released: 1981

Professional ratings
Review scores
Source	Rating
AllMusic	3/5 stars

Stephanie is the Grammy-nominated fifth studio album by American R&B/soul singer Stephanie Mills. It was released in 1981 and produced by James Mtume and Reggie Lucas. The album features hit song "Two Hearts" a duet with Teddy Pendergrass. By default, this fulfilled her contract with 20th Century-Fox Records, as the following year, the label was sold to PolyGram Records, which quickly folded it into Casablanca Records, to which Mills' contract was subsequently transferred. Stephanie scored Mills her second nomination for Best Female R&B Vocal Performance at the 24th Annual Grammy Awards in 1982.

== Track listing ==
- All songs written by James Mtume and Reggie Lucas except where indicated.

No.	Title	Writer(s)	Length
1.	"Winner"		4:50
2.	"Two Hearts" (duet with Teddy Pendergrass)	Tawatha Agee; James Mtume; Reggie Lucas	4:44
3.	"Don't Stop Doin' What 'Cha Do"		4:48
4.	"Top of My List"	Rodney Brown; Willie Lester	3:42
5.	"I Believe in Love Songs"		4:14
6.	"Night Games"		5:47
7.	"My Love's Been Good to You"	Howard King; Agee	4:12
8.	"Magic"	Jeffrey Daniel; Stephanie Mills	5:07

== Personnel ==
- Stephanie Mills – lead and backing vocals
- Basil Fearington – bass
- Howard King – drums
- Reggie Lucas, Ed "Tree" Moore – guitar
- James Mtume, Hubert Eaves III – keyboards
- Brenda White King, Luther Vandross, Ullanda McCullough, Tawatha Agee – backing vocals

Technical

- Jim "Doc" Dougherty – engineer
- Gerry Block, Jay Mark – additional engineer
- Craig S. Michaels, Matthew Weiner – assistant engineer
- Eugene Bianco – horns and strings contractor

== Charts ==
Chart (1981)	Peak position
US Billboard 200	30
US Billboard Top R&B Albums	3

=== Singles ===
Year	Single	Chart positions			
Year	Single	US Pop	US R&B	US Dance	UK
1981	"Two Hearts"	40	3	82	49
1981	"Night Games"	—	33	—	—
