= (You're Puttin') A Rush on Me =

Single by Stephanie Mills

from the album If I Were Your Woman
- Released: 1987
- Genre: R&B; dance; new jack swing
- Length: 5:50
- Label: MCA 5669
- Songwriters: Paul Laurence; Timmy Allen
- Producer: Paul Laurence

Stephanie Mills singles chronology
"I Feel Good All Over" (1987)	"(You're Puttin') A Rush on Me" (1987)	"Secret Lady" (1987)

"(You're Puttin') A Rush on Me" is a 1987 song by American singer Stephanie Mills. It was released as the second single from her album If I Were Your Woman. The song was her third number one on US Hot Black Singles chart and second number one in 1987. The single spent one week at the top spot and crossed over to the Billboard Hot 100, peaking at number eighty-five. "(You're Puttin') A Rush on Me" also peaked at number twenty-three on the dance charts.

== Track listing and formats ==
- US 7" Vinyl single
  - A1: "(You're Puttin') A Rush on Me" – 4:25
  - B1: "(You're Puttin') A Rush on Me" (Instrumental) – 4:25
- US 12" Vinyl single
  - A1: "(You're Puttin') A Rush on Me" (Club Mix) – 8:33
  - B1: "(You're Puttin') A Rush on Me" (Radio Edit) – 5:50
  - B2: "(You're Puttin') A Rush on Me" (Instrumental) – 5:50
  - B3: "(You're Puttin') A Rush on Me" (Rushapella) – 5:05
  - B4: "(You're Puttin') A Rush on Me" (Bonus Beats) – 6:00
- UK 12" Vinyl single
  - A1: "(You're Puttin') A Rush on Me" (Club Mix) – 8:33
  - B1: "(You're Puttin') A Rush on Me" (Instrumental) – 5:50
  - B2: "(You're Puttin') A Rush on Me" (Rushapella) – 5:05

== Personnel ==
- Executive Producer – Cassandra Mills, Stephanie Mills
- Mastered By – Steve Hall
- Engineer [Remix] – Taavi Mote
- Producer – Paul Laurence
- Remix producer – Louil Silas, Jr.
- Written By – Paul Laurence, Timmy Allen

== Charts ==
=== Weekly charts ===
Chart (1987)	Peak position
US Billboard Hot 100	85
US Dance Club Songs (Billboard)	23
US Hot R&B/Hip-Hop Songs (Billboard)	1

=== Year-end charts ===
Chart (1987)	Position
US Hot R&B/Hip-Hop Songs (Billboard)	30
