= Home (Stephanie Mills album) =

Studio album by Stephanie Mills
- Released: June 26, 1989
- Recorded: 1988–1989
- Genre: R&B; soul
- Length: 68:35
- Label: MCA
- Producer: Angela Winbush; Wayne Brathwaite; Barry J. Eastmond; Gerald Levert & Marc Gordon; Timmy Gatling & Alton "Wokie" Stewart; Gene Griffin; Cassandra Mills; Stephanie Mills; Sami McKenny & Kevin Phillips; Nick Martinelli; LeMel Humes

Stephanie Mills chronology
If I Were Your Woman (1987)	Home (1989)	Christmas (1991)

Singles from Home
- 1. "Something in the Way (You Make Me Feel)" Released: 1989; 2. "Home" Released: 1989

Professional ratings
Review scores
Source	Rating
AllMusic	4/5 stars

Home is the twelfth studio album by American R&B recording artist Stephanie Mills. It was released June 26, 1989, on MCA Records and peaked at No. 5 on Billboard Top R&B Albums. The album features the R&B hit singles, the title track "Home" and "Something in the Way (You Make Me Feel)"; both were number one hits on Billboard Top R&B Songs chart.

== Track listing ==
No.	Title	Writer(s)	Producer(s)	Length
1.	"Something in the Way (You Make Me Feel)"	Angela Winbush	Winbush	5:27
2.	"Real Love"	Tammy Lucas; Teddy Riley	Gene Griffin	6:47
3.	"Home"	Charlie Smalls	Nick Martinelli	5:25
4.	"So Good, So Right"	Winbush	Winbush	6:03
5.	"Comfort of a Man"	David Young; Dyna Brein	LeMel Humes	5:50
6.	"I Come to You"	Sami McKinney; Kevin Phillips	McKinney; Phillips	4:30
7.	"Good Girl Gone Bad"	Gerald Levert; Marc Gordon	LeVert; Gordon	4:46
8.	"Ain't No Cookin'"	Timmy Gatling; Alton Stewart	Timmy Gatling	5:08
9.	"Fast Talk"	Griffin; Stephanie Mills	Griffin	5:06

CD bonus tracks
No.	Title	Writer(s)	Producer(s)	Length
10.	"Love Hasn't Been Easy on Me"	Donald Lawrence; Mills	Wayne Brathwaite	4:43
11.	"I'm More Than a Woman"	Lawrence; Mills	Barry Eastmond	5:28
12.	"Something in the Way (You Make Me Feel)" (Extended Mix)	Winbush	Louil Silas Jr.	9:22

Notes

- Track 12: "Something in the Way (You Make Me Feel)" (Remix) produced and arranged by Louil Silas Jr.

== Personnel ==
Credits taken from album liner notes.

- Executive producer – Cassandra Mills, Stephanie Mills
- Mastered by – Steve Hall
- Backing vocals [all additional] – Stephanie Mills
- Guitar – Randy Bowland (track 7), Kenny Hawkins, Paul Pesco (track 5), Ira Siegel (tracks 10 & 11)
- Drums – Mike Caputy (track 5), John Robinson (track 4), Terry Silverlight (track 10), Buddy Williams (track 11)
- Backing vocals – Audrey Wheeler, Genobia Jeter, Stephanie James (track 5), Angel Rogers, Marva King (track 6), Take 6 (track 3), Darryll Stokes, Dianne Garisto, Will Downing (track 10)
- Mixed by – David Bianco,
- Horns – Daniel Higgins, Gary Grant, Jerry Hey (track 5)
- Percussion – Steve Croom (track 10)
- Piano – Robert Dampe (track 10)
- Saxophone – Brandon Fields (track 5), Mark Rivera (track 10)
- Electric piano [Rhodes], synth [bass, horns] – Curtis Dowd (track 3)
- Keyboards – Donald Robinson (track 3), Bobby Jones (track 5), Eric Rehl (track 11)
- Bass [Spector] – Douglas Grisby (track 3), bass – Jerry Livingston (track 5), Nathan East (track 4), Wayne Brathwaite (track 10), Luico Hopper (track 11)
- Producers – Angela Winbush (tracks 1, 4 & 12), Nick Martinelli (track 3), Gene Griffin (tracks 2 & 9), LeMel Humes (track 5), Gerald Levert, Marc Gordon (track 7), Timmy Gatling (track 8), Sami McKinney, Kevin Phillips (track 6), Wayne Brathwaite (track 10), Barry J. Eastmond (track 11)
- Producer [remix] – Louis Silas Jr. (track 12)

Copyright (c) – MCA Records, Inc Phonographic Copyright (p) – MCA Records, Inc. Copyright (c) – MCA Records, Inc.
Distributed, Manufactured By – MCA Records, Inc

== Charts ==
=== Weekly charts ===
Chart (1989)	Peak position
US Billboard 200	82
US Top R&B/Hip-Hop Albums (Billboard)	5

=== Year-end charts ===
Chart (1989)	Position
US Top R&B/Hip-Hop Albums (Billboard)	40
Chart (1990)	Position
US Top R&B/Hip-Hop Albums (Billboard)	18

=== Singles ===
Year	Single	Chart positions		
Year	Single	US Pop	US R&B	US Dance
1989	"Something in the Way (You Make Me Feel)"	—	1	—
1989	"Home"	—	1	48
1990	"Comfort of a Man"	—	8	—
