= Sweet Sensation (Stephanie Mills album) =

Studio album by Stephanie Mills
- Released: April 16, 1980
- Recorded: 1979–1980
- Studios: Sigma Sound, New York City
- Genres: Pop; soul; post-disco
- Label: 20th Century Fox
- Producers: James Mtume; Reggie Lucas

Stephanie Mills chronology
What Cha Gonna Do with My Lovin' (1979)	Sweet Sensation (1980)	Stephanie (1981)

Singles from Sweet Sensation
- 1. "Sweet Sensation" Released: 1980; 2. "Never Knew Love Like This Before" Released: 1980

Professional ratings
Review scores
Source	Rating
AllMusic	3/5 stars
Billboard	(unrated)

Sweet Sensation is the fourth album by American R&B and soul singer Stephanie Mills. It was released in 1980 and produced by James Mtume and Reggie Lucas. The album features her biggest hit, "Never Knew Love Like This Before" which peaked within the top ten of the US Billboard Hot 100 and won two Grammy Awards for Best R&B Vocal Performance, Female and Best R&B Song, the former becoming her first career Grammy win. Sweet Sensation received gold status by the Recording Industry Association of America for sales of over 500,000 copies.

== Track listing ==
- All songs written by James Mtume and Reggie Lucas except where indicated.

No.	Title	Writer(s)	Length
1.	"Sweet Sensation"		4:30
2.	"Try My Love"	Tawatha Agee; Hubert Eaves III	3:50
3.	"I Just Wanna Say"		6:10
4.	"Wish That You Were Mine"		4:33
5.	"D-A-N-C-I-N'"	Edward Moore; Howard King	5:41
6.	"Still Mine"		5:43
7.	"Never Knew Love Like This Before"		5:27
8.	"Mixture of Love"	Joe Mills; John Simmons	4:25

== Personnel ==
- Stephanie Mills – vocals
- Hubert Eaves III – keyboards
- James Mtume – keyboards, percussion, backing vocals, rhythm arrangements, vocal arrangements, producer
- Ed Walsh – synthesizer programming
- Reggie Lucas – guitars, backing vocals, rhythm arrangements, vocal arrangements, producer
- Ed Moore – guitars
- Basil Fearington – bass guitar
- Howard King – drums
- Gene Blanco – horn and string arrangements
- Wade Marcus – horn and string arrangements
- Tawatha Agee – backing vocals, vocal contractor
- Gwen Guthrie – backing vocals
- Brenda White King – backing vocals

Production

- Recorded and mixed at Sigma Sound Studios (New York, NY)
- James Dougherty – engineer, mixing
- Craig Michaels – assistant engineer
- Ted Jensen – mastering at Sterling Sound (New York, NY)
- Glen Christensen – art direction, photography
- Stanley James – make-up, hair stylist

== Charts ==
=== Weekly charts ===
Chart performance for Sweet Sensation
Chart (1980)	Peak position
US Billboard 200	16
US Top R&B/Hip-Hop Albums (Billboard)	3

=== Year-end charts ===
Year-end chart performance for Sweet Sensation
Chart (1980)	Position
US Billboard 200	62
US Top R&B/Hip-Hop Albums (Billboard)	23

== Singles ==
Year	Single	Chart positions				
Year	Single	US	US R&B	US A/C	US Dance	UK
1980	"Sweet Sensation"	52	3	—	5	—
1980	"Never Knew Love Like This Before"	6	12	5	5	4
