= I've Got the Cure =

Studio album by Stephanie Mills
- Released: September 10, 1984
- Recorded: 1983–1984
- Genres: R&B; dance
- Label: Casablanca
- Producers: George Duke; David "Hawk" Wolinski

Stephanie Mills chronology
Merciless (1983)	I've Got the Cure (1984)	Stephanie Mills (1985)

Singles from I've Got the Cure
- 1. "The Medicine Song" Released: 1984; 2. "Edge of the Razor" Released: 1984

Professional ratings
Review scores
Source	Rating
AllMusic	2/5 stars

I've Got the Cure is the eighth studio album by American singer Stephanie Mills, released on September 10, 1984, by Casablanca Records, her final release for the label. It features the single "The Medicine Song", which peaked at number one on the Billboard Dance Club Songs chart. The album peaked at No. 73 on the U.S. Billboard 200 and at No. 10 on the U.S. Billboard Top R&B/Hip-Hop Albums chart.

In 2013, the UK's Cherry Red Records reissued I've Got the Cure on their Soul Music Records imprint. This re-release is an expanded edition compact disc which includes "The Medicine Song" (Original Mark Berry 12" Mix), "Edge of the Razor" (Dance Mix) and "Edge of the Razor" (Dub Mix) as bonus tracks.

Four of the album's ten tracks - "Edge of the Razor", "Give it Half a Chance", "Outrageous" and "Everlasting Love" were produced by George Duke who also played on the album.

== Track listing ==
Side one
No.	Title	Writer(s)	Length
1.	"The Medicine Song"	David "Hawk" Wolinski	4:52
2.	"Edge of the Razor"	Tom Snow; Roy Freeland	4:56
3.	"In My Life"	Pat Leonard; Keithen Carter	4:06
4.	"Give It Half a Chance"	Kenny Loggins; Stephen Bishop	4:41

Side two
No.	Title	Writer(s)	Length
5.	"Outrageous"	Len Ron Hanks; John Lewis Parker	4:50
6.	"You Might Just Need a Friend"	Leonard; Carter	3:56
7.	"Everlasting Love"	Howard Grate; Michael Powell	4:23
8.	"Rough Trade"	Leonard; Carter; Wolinski	3:49
9.	"Undercover"	Leonard; Carter	3:50

2013 SoulMusic Records reissue CD bonus tracks
No.	Title	Length
10.	"The Medicine Song" (Mark Berry 12" Mix)	6:40
11.	"Edge of the Razor" (Dance Mix)	6:39
12.	"Edge of the Razor" (Dub Mix)	4:01

== Personnel ==
Credits are adapted from the I've Got the Cure liner notes.

- Stephanie Mills – lead vocals, backing vocals (1, 3, 5–9)
- David "Hawk" Wolinski – keyboards (1, 3, 6, 8, 9), synthesizer programming (1), guitars (1)
- George Duke – Memorymoog (2, 4, 5, 7), Moog bass (2), LinnDrum (2, 5), backing vocals (2, 4), Rhodes (4, 7), electric grand piano (5)
- Patrick Leonard – keyboards (3, 6, 8, 9), synthesizer programming (3, 6, 8, 9)
- Kevin Murphy – vocoder (8)
- Paul Jackson Jr. – guitars (2, 5)
- Bruce Gaitsch – guitars (3, 6, 8, 9)
- David T. Walker – guitars (7)
- Fred Washington – bass guitar (4, 7)
- John Robinson – drums (3, 4), Simmons drums (8, 9)
- Paulinho da Costa – percussion (4)
- Kim Hutchcroft – alto saxophone solo (2)
- Larry Williams – flute (4)
- George Del Barrio – string arrangements and conductor (4)
- Lynn Davis – backing vocals (2, 4)
- Marcy Levy – backing vocals (2, 4)
- Julia Waters – backing vocals (3, 6, 8)
- Maxine Waters – backing vocals (3, 6, 8)
- The Weather Girls – backing vocals (7)

Production

- George Duke – producer, arrangements
- Hawk Wolinski – co-producer (1, 3, 6, 8, 9)
- Stephanie Mills – executive producer
- Ivy Skoff – production assistant (1, 3, 6, 8, 9)
- Constance de Guzman – production assistant (2, 4, 5, 7)
- John Arrias – recording (1, 3, 6, 8, 9), mixing (1, 3, 6, 8, 9)
- Tommy Vicari – recording (2, 4, 5, 7), mixing (2, 4, 5, 7)
- David Luke – assistant engineer (2, 4, 5, 7)
- David Marquette – assistant engineer (2, 4, 5, 7)
- Nick Spigel – assistant engineer (2, 4, 5, 7)
- Glen Christensen – art direction, design
- Ron Slenzak – photography
- Glenn Parsons – lettering
- Cassandra Mills – album concept, management

Studios

- Recorded at Fantasy Records (Berkeley, California); Soundcastle (Hollywood, California); Le Gonks West (West Hollywood, California); Cherokee Studios and Foot on the Hill (Los Angeles, California).

== Charts ==
Chart (1984)	Peak position
US Billboard 200	73
US Top R&B/Hip-Hop Albums (Billboard)	10

=== Singles ===
Year	Single	Chart positions			
Year	Single	US	US R&B	US Dance	UK
1984	"The Medicine Song"	65	8	1	29
1984	"Edge of the Razor"	—	47	14	—
