= Personal Inspirations =

Studio album by Stephanie Mills
- Released: September 6, 1994
- Genre: Urban gospel; R&B
- Length: 51:57
- Label: Sony; GospoCentric
- Producer: Donald Lawrence; Stanley Brown; Kevin Bond; Stephanie Mills

Stephanie Mills chronology
Something Real (1992)	Personal Inspirations (1994)	Born for This! (2004)

Professional ratings
Review scores
Source	Rating
AllMusic	3/5 stars

Personal Inspirations is an album by American R&B singer Stephanie Mills released in 1994 on the independent label GospoCentric Records, it is her first gospel album release. It was produced by Mills, and gospel artist Donald Lawrence. Featured, are songs written by gospel/R&B singers' Marvin Winans, Angela Winbush, James Cleveland, and a cover version of "People Get Ready" by Curtis Mayfield. The album peaked at No. 8 on the Billboard Gospel chart, and No. 20 on the Billboard Contemporary Christian chart.

== Track listing ==
No.	Title	Writer(s)	Producer(s)	Length
1.	"I Had a Talk with God"	James Cleveland	Donald Lawrence; Stephanie Mills	6:25
2.	"Sweepin' Through the City"	James Herndon	Lawrence; Mills	4:10
3.	"He Cares"	John P. Kee	Lawrence; Mills	5:15
4.	"In the Morning Time"	Robert Wright	Lawrence; Stanley Brown	4:42
5.	"Everything You Touch"	Marvin Winans	Lawrence; Kevin Bond	6:13
6.	"Everybody Ought to Know"		Lawrence; Bond	6:02
7.	"Power of God"	Angela Winbush	Lawrence; Mills	7:36
8.	"People Get Ready"	Curtis Mayfield	Lawrence; Brown	4:12
9.	"He Cares" (Reprise)		Lawrence; Mills	3:25
10.	"I'm Gonna Make You Proud"	Lawrence	Lawrence; Mills	3:58

== Personnel ==
- Stephanie Mills - Lead and backing vocals
- Backing vocals – Tricity Singers (tracks: 1, 5)
- Bass – Mel Gray
- Drums – James Robinson (tracks: 2), Jeremy Hays
- Percussion – Jim Brock
- Guitar – Eric Brice
- Keyboards – Kevin Bond, Stanley Brown (tracks: 4, 8)
- Mixed by Donald Lawrence, Mark Williams, Stephanie Mills
- Engineer by Dave Harris, Donald Lawrence, Mark Williams (tracks: 2), Mike Lawler (tracks: 2)
- Executive producer – Donald Lawrence, Stephanie Mills
- Producer – Donald Lawrence, Kevin Bond (tracks: 5, 6), Stanley Brown (tracks: 4, 8), Stephanie Mills (tracks: 1, 2, 3, 7, 9, 10)

Credits taken from album liner notes.

== Charts ==
Chart (1994)	Peak position
US Top Christian Albums (Billboard)	20
US Top Gospel Albums (Billboard)	8
