= Something in the Way (You Make Me Feel) =

Single by Stephanie Mills

from the album Home
- Released: 1989
- Recorded: August 1988
- Genre: R&B; soul
- Length: 5:27
- Label: MCA 5669
- Songwriter: Angela Winbush
- Producer: Angela Winbush

Stephanie Mills singles chronology
"If I Were Your Woman" (1988)	"Something in the Way (You Make Me Feel)" (1989)	"Home" (1989)

"Something in the Way (You Make Me Feel)" is a 1989 song by Stephanie Mills, released as the first single from her album Home. It was Mills' fourth R&B number one on Billboard's Top R&B Songs chart. The single was both written and produced by Angela Winbush, who had overseen her first US R&B number one "I Have Learned to Respect the Power of Love" in 1986.

== Track listing ==
- US 7" Vinyl single
  - A1: "Something in the Way (You Make Me Feel)" – 4:37
  - B1: "Love Hasn't Been Easy On Me" (Edit) – 4:18
- UK 12" Vinyl single
  - A1: "Something in the Way (You Make Me Feel)" (Extended Mix) – 5:25
  - B1: "Something in the Way (You Make Me Feel)" (Hip Hop Mix) – 5:07
  - B2: "Something in the Way (You Make Me Feel)" (Marley Mix) – 5:07

Extended Mix: Remix producer – Louil Silas Jr.
Hip Hop Mix and Marl Mix: Remix producer – Marley Marl

== Personnel ==
- Executive producer – Cassandra Mills, Stephanie Mills
- Producer – Angela Winbush
- Vocals – Stephanie Mills
- Backing Vocals – Stephanie Mills
- Engineer Assistant – Dennis Stefani
- Engineer Mix – David Bianco
- Mixed By – Louil Silas Jr.

== Charts ==
=== Weekly charts ===
Chart (1989)	Peak position
US Hot R&B/Hip-Hop Songs (Billboard)	1

=== Year-end charts ===
Chart (1989)	Position
US Hot R&B/Hip-Hop Songs (Billboard)	6
