= If I Were Your Woman (Stephanie Mills album) =

Studio album by Stephanie Mills
- Released: June 1, 1987
- Recorded: 1986–1987
- Studios: Alpha International Studios (Philadelphia, PA); Celestial Sound Studios, Greene St. Recording, Quadrasonic Studios, Sigma Sound and Unique Recording Studios (New York City, NY); Cherokee Studios and Sound Castle Recorders (Los Angeles, CA); Baby O'Recorders (Hollywood, CA); Mama Jo's Studio and Larrabee Sound Studios (North Hollywood, CA); Battery Studios (London, UK).
- Genres: R&B; soul
- Length: 39:58
- Label: MCA
- Producers: Nick Martinelli; Ron Kersey; Paul Laurence; Robert Brookins; La La; Wayne Brathwaite; Davy D; Russell Simmons

Stephanie Mills chronology
Stephanie Mills (1985)	If I Were Your Woman (1987)	Home (1989)

Singles from If I Were Your Woman
- 1. "I Feel Good All Over" Released: 1987; 2. "(You're Puttin') A Rush on Me" Released: 1987; 3. "Secret Lady" Released: 1988; 4. "If I Were Your Woman" Released: 1988

Professional ratings
Review scores
Source	Rating
AllMusic	3/5 stars
The New York Times	(favorable)

If I Were Your Woman is the eleventh studio album by American recording artist Stephanie Mills, released on June 1, 1987, on MCA Records. The album peaked at No. 1 on the Billboard Top R&B/Hip-Hop Albums chart and No. 30 on the Billboard 200 chart. If I Were Your Woman was also certified Gold and Platinum in the US by the RIAA.

== Critical reception ==
Robert K. Oermann of USA Today ranked this album at No. 26 on his list of 1987's top 50 R&B albums.

== Singles ==
The album's lead single "I Feel Good All Over" reached No. 1 on the Billboard Hot Soul Songs chart and No. 22 on the Billboard Dance Single Sales chart. Its second single titled "(You're Puttin') A Rush on Me" peaked at No. 1 on the Billboard Hot Soul Songs chart and No. 15 on the Billboard Dance Single Sales chart. A remix of "(You're Puttin') A Rush on Me" peaked at No. 23 on the Billboard Dance Club Songs chart. The album's title track also reached No. 19 on the Billboard Hot Soul Songs chart.

== Track listing ==
No.	Title	Writer(s)	Producer(s)	Length
1.	"I Feel Good All Over"	Gabriel Hardeman; Annette Hardeman	Nick Martinelli	5:02
2.	"If I Were Your Woman"	Clay McMurray; Pamela Sawyer; Gloria Jones	Ron "Have Mercy" Kersey	4:36
3.	"(You're Puttin') A Rush on Me"	Timmy Allen; Paul Laurence	Laurence	5:52
4.	"Jesse"	Robert Brookins; Tony Haynes	Brookins	5:17
5.	"Secret Lady"	Mills; Howard Grate	LaForrest "La La "Cope	5:25
6.	"Touch Me Now"	Mills; Barry J. Eastmond; Terry Alexander; Wayne Brathwaithe	Brathwaithe	4:54
7.	"Running for Your Love"	Mills; Brathwaithe; Alexander	Brathwaithe	4:33
8.	"Can't Change My Ways"	David Reeves; Mills	Davy D; Russell Simmons	4:28

== Personnel ==
- Stephanie Mills – lead vocals, backing vocals (2, 3, 6, 7)
- Donald Robinson – acoustic piano (1), Rhodes piano (1)
- Randy Cantor – synthesizers (1)
- Ron Kersey – keyboards (2), programming (2)
- Paul Laurence – all other instruments (3)
- Robert Brookins – keyboards (4), programming (4)
- George Duke – acoustic piano (4)
- Barry Eastmond – keyboards (5), pianos (6)
- LaForrest "La La" Cope – keyboards (5), arrangements (5)
- V. Jeffrey Smith – synthesizers (5), additional programming (5), rhythm arrangements (5)
- Skip Anderson – acoustic piano (7)
- Keith Andes – additional synthesizers (7)
- Davy D – all instruments (8)
- Randy Bowland – guitars (1)
- Herb Smith – guitars (2)
- Kevin Chokan – guitars (4)
- Ira Siegel – guitars (5, 6)
- Mike Campbell – guitars (7)
- Doug Grigsby – bass (1)
- Freddie Washington – bass (2)
- Timmy Allen – bass (3)
- Wayne Braithwaite – bass (5, 6, 7), synthesizers (7), drum programming (7)
- Darryl Burgee – drums (1), percussion (1)
- John Paris – drum overdubs (4)
- Yogi Horton – drums (5)
- Terry Silverlight – drums (6)
- Jimmy Maelen – percussion (5)
- Bashiri Johnson – percussion (6)
- Nick Martinelli – arrangements (1)
- Edith Wint – string contractor (6)
- Richard Henrickson – concertmaster (6)
- Cynthia Biggs – backing vocals (1)
- Deborah Dukes – backing vocals (1)
- Annette Hardeman – backing vocals (1)
- Gabriel Hardeman – backing vocals (1), arrangements (1)
- Charlene Holloway – backing vocals (1)
- Gordon Scott – backing vocals (1)
- Alex Brown – backing vocals (2, 4, 6, 7, 8), BGV arrangements (2, 4–7)
- Lynn Davis – backing vocals (2)
- Vesta Williams – backing vocals (2)
- Marva King – backing vocals (4)
- Paulette McWilliams – backing vocals (4)
- Julia Tillman Waters – backing vocals (6, 7, 8)
- Maxine Waters – backing vocals (6, 7, 8)
- Cliff Branch – backing vocals (7)

Technical

- Taavi Mote – remix engineer
- Hill Swimmer – engineer (1)
- Erik Zobler – engineer (2)
- Ron Banks – engineer (3)
- Louil Silas Jr. – remixing (3, 5)
- Mitch Gibson – engineer (4)
- Tommy Vicari – engineer (4, 8)
- Philip Walters – engineer (4)
- Carl Beatty – engineer (5)
- Fernando Kral – engineer (5, 6)
- Cassandra Mills – remixing (5)
- John Convertino – engineer (6, 7)
- Acar Key – engineer (6, 7)
- Brian Max – engineer (6, 7)
- Barbara Milne – engineer (6, 7)
- Bryan "Chuck" New – engineer (6, 7)
- Jon Smith – engineer (6, 7)

Design

- Cassandra Mills – executive producer, album concept
- Stephanie Mills – executive producer, album concept
- September – art direction, design
- Ron Slenzak – photography
- Jeffrey Beaton – make-up
- James Gibson – hair stylist

== Charts ==
Chart (1987)	Peak position
US Billboard 200	30
US Top R&B/Hip-Hop Albums (Billboard)	1

=== Singles ===
Year	Single	Chart positions			
Year	Single	US Pop	US R&B	US Dance	UK
1987	"I Feel Good All Over"	—	1	—	—
1987	"(You're Puttin') A Rush on Me"	85	1	23	62
1987	"Secret Lady"	—	7	—	—
1988	"If I Were Your Woman"	—	19	—	—

== See also ==
- List of number-one R&B albums of 1987 (U.S.)
