= What Cha Gonna Do with My Lovin' =

1979 studio album by Stephanie Mills

Studio album by Stephanie Mills
- Released: March 29, 1979
- Recorded: 1978
- Studio: Sigma Sound, New York City
- Genre: R&B; soul; post-disco
- Label: 20th Century Fox
- Producer: James Mtume; Reggie Lucas

Stephanie Mills chronology
For the First Time (1975)	What Cha Gonna Do with My Lovin' (1979)	Sweet Sensation (1980)

Singles from What Cha Gonna Do with My Lovin'
- 1. "What Cha Gonna Do with My Lovin' " Released: 1979; 2. "You Can Get Over" Released: 1979; 3. "Put Your Body in It" Released: 1979

What Cha Gonna Do with My Lovin' is the third album by Stephanie Mills. It was released in 1979 and produced by James Mtume and Reggie Lucas.

== Critical reception ==
Professional ratings
Review scores
Source	Rating
AllMusic	4.5/5 stars
Music Week	2/4 stars
The Virgin Encyclopedia of R&B and Soul	3/5 stars

The Bay State Banner wrote: "There are the usual gospel roots to Mills's intense mannerism, and there are many instances of additional studio distortion—listen to her electric squawk in 'Put Your Body In It'—but the safe licks her band plays give us something familiar to hang on to while Mills camps it up."

== Track listing ==
- All songs written by James Mtume and Reggie Lucas except where indicated.

No.	Title	Writer(s)	Length
1.	"What Cha Gonna Do with My Lovin'"		4:05
2.	"You Can Get Over"		4:59
3.	"Deeper Inside Your Love"		3:54
4.	"Feel the Fire"	Peabo Bryson	5:13
5.	"Put Your Body In It"	Edward Moore; Howard King	4:05
6.	"Starlight"		3:35
7.	"You and I"		4:46
8.	"Don't Stop Dancin'"		3:45

== Personnel ==
- Stephanie Mills – lead vocals, backing vocals
- Howard T. King – drums
- Ed "Tree" Moore, Reggie Lucas – guitars
- Basil Fearington – bass guitar
- Joe Caro – acoustic guitar
- Harry Whitaker, Hubert Eaves III – keyboards
- Ed Walsh – synthesizer programming
- Bashiri Johnson, James Mtume – percussion
- Brenda White King, Gwen Guthrie, Lani Groves, Tawatha Agee, Louise Bethune, Mary Johnson, John Simmons, James Mtume, Reggie Lucas, Howard King – backing vocals
- Wade Marcus – strings and horn arrangements

== Charts ==
Chart (1979)	Peak position
US Billboard 200	22
US Billboard Top R&B Albums	12

=== Singles ===
Year	Single	Chart positions		
Year	Single	US	US R&B	US Dance
1979	"What Cha Gonna Do with My Lovin'"	22	8	—
1979	"You Can Get Over"	—	55	8
1979	"Put Your Body in It"	—	—	8
