= For the First Time (Stephanie Mills album) =

Studio album by Stephanie Mills
- Released: October 11, 1975
- Recorded: 1975
- Genre: Soul
- Label: Motown
- Producer: Burt Bacharach; Hal David

Stephanie Mills chronology
Movin' in the Right Direction (1974)	For the First Time (1975)	What Cha Gonna Do with My Lovin' (1979)

Professional ratings
Review scores
Source	Rating
AllMusic	2.5/5 stars

For the First Time is the second album by Stephanie Mills. Released in 1975 on the Motown label. Produced by Burt Bacharach and Hal David; directed by Phil Ramone. The arrangements were by Burt Bacharach, Bill Eaton, Dave Matthews and Kenny Asher. After a fallout during the recording of the soundtrack to the remake of Lost Horizon, Bacharach and David split before briefly reuniting for this album. After this album project that featured eight new songs plus two covers of songs that Dionne Warwick had previously recorded, the famous songwriting duo would not work together until they wrote three unrecorded songs in 1978. They then did not write together again until a reunion in 1989, when they wrote two songs - "How Can I Love You" which remains unrecorded, and "Sunny Weather Lover" which was eventually recorded by Dionne Warwick for her 1993 album Friends Can Be Lovers.

== Track listing ==
All songs written by Burt Bacharach and Hal David

Side one
No.	Title	Length
1.	"I Took My Strength from You"	3:50
2.	"Living on Plastic"	2:48
3.	"No One Remembers My Name"	3:22
4.	"If You Can Learn How to Cry"	3:23
5.	"Loneliness Remembers (What Happiness Forgets)"	2:30

Side two
No.	Title	Length
6.	"This Empty Place"	3:10
7.	"The Way I Feel About You"	3:05
8.	"I See You for the First Time"	3:06
9.	"All the Way to Paradise"	3:19
10.	"Please Let Go"	3:49

== Personnel ==
- Vocals – Stephanie Mills
- Arranger – Burt Bacharach, except track 4 (Bill Eaton), 5 (Dave Matthews), and 6, 8 (Kenny Asher)
- Engineer [Assistant] – Burt Szerlip, Craig David (2), David Smith (10), Rich Blakin, Vicki Fabry
- Photography – Frank Moscati
- Engineer [Director] – Phil Ramone
- Art Direction – Frank Mulvey
- Producer, Writer – Hal David and Burt Bacharach
