= Merciless (Stephanie Mills album) =

Studio album by Stephanie Mills
- Released: August 20, 1983
- Recorded: 1982–1983
- Studio: The Hit Factory; Automated Sound Studios (New York); Cherokee Recording Studios; The Record Plant; Bossa Nova Hotel (Los Angeles)
- Genre: R&B; post-disco; soul
- Label: Casablanca
- Producer: David Wolfert; Gary Klein; Phil Ramone

Stephanie Mills chronology
Love Has Lifted Me (1982)	Merciless (1983)	I've Got the Cure (1984)

Singles from Merciless
- 1. "Pilot Error" Released: 1983; 2. "How Come U Don't Call Me Anymore?" Released: 1983

Professional ratings
Review scores
Source	Rating
AllMusic	4/5 stars

Merciless is the seventh studio album by American R&B singer Stephanie Mills. It was released in 1983 and Stephanie's second release on Casablanca Records. The album features two Billboard R&B hits in "Pilot Error", a cover version of Prince's "How Come U Don't Call Me Anymore?" as well as "My Body" written by singer Luther Vandross. Merciless received a nomination for Best R&B Vocal Performance, Female at the 26th Grammy Awards in 1984.

== Track listing ==
All songs produced by David Wolfert and Gary Klein except where indicated.

No.	Title	Writer(s)	Producer(s)	Length
1.	"How Come U Don't Call Me Anymore?"	Prince		4:12
2.	"Never Get Enough of You"	David Wolfert; Henry Gaffney		4:31
3.	"Eternal Love"	Jay Asher; Paul Jabara		4:41
4.	"His Name Is Michael" (featuring Peggi Blu)	Cassandra Mills; Michael Sembello; Stephanie Mills	Phil Ramone	3:18
5.	"Here I Am"	Wolfert; Gaffney		4:13
6.	"My Body"	Luther Vandross		4:06
7.	"Do You Love Him?"	Barbara Morr; Betsy Durkin Matthes		3:47
8.	"Pilot Error"	Peter Kingsbery		5:07
9.	"Since We've Been Together"	Ralph Schuckett; Richard Kleinberg		3:13

== Personnel ==
- Stephanie Mills – lead and backing vocals
- Greg Phillinganes – keyboards, acoustic piano
- Richard Tee – keyboards, acoustic piano
- Johnny Mandel – synthesizers, arrangements (7)
- Danny Sembello – synthesizers
- Nyle Steiner – synthesizers
- Ian Underwood – synthesizers
- Ed Walsh – synthesizers
- Buzz Feiten – guitars
- Carlos Rios – guitars
- Thom Rotella - guitars
- Michael Sembello – guitars, backing vocals
- David Wolfert – guitars, arrangements (1, 2, 3, 5, 6, 8, 9), BGV arrangements
- Nathan East – bass
- Neil Stubenhaus – bass
- Ed Greene – drums
- John Robinson - drums
- Carlos Vega – drums
- Lenny Castro – percussion
- Victor Feldman – percussion
- Eddie Karam – arrangements (7)
- Ralph Schuckett – rhythm arrangements (9)
- Frank Floyd – BGV arrangements
- Peggi Blu – backing vocals
- Lani Groves – backing vocals
- Yvonne Lewis – backing vocals
- Cruz Sembello – backing vocals
- Myrna Smith – backing vocals

Technical

- John Arrais – engineer, mixing (1, 2, 3, 5–9), remixing (1, 2, 3, 5–9)
- Phil Ramone – mixing (4)
- Peter Chaiken – engineer
- Lee DeCarlo – engineer
- Bradshaw Leigh – engineer
- Brian McGee – engineer
- Marie Ostrosky – engineer
- Jay Rifkin – engineer
- Ted Jensen – mastering at Sterling Sound (New York, NY)

Production

- Charles Koppleman – executive producer
- Gary Klein – producer (1, 2, 3, 5–9)
- David Wolfert – producer (1, 2, 3, 5–9)
- Phil Ramone – producer (4)
- Linda Gerrity – production coordinator
- Glen Christensen – art direction, photography
- Mac James – artwork, design
- Bill King – inner sleeve photography
- Cassandra Mills – cover concept
- Stephanie Mills – cover concept
- Frank DeCaro – LA contractor
- Phil Medley – NY contractor

== Charts ==
Chart (1983)	Peak position
US Billboard 200	104
US Billboard Top R&B Albums	12

=== Singles ===
Year	Single	Chart positions	
Year	Single	US R&B	US Dance
1983	"Pilot Error"	12	3
1983	"How Come U Don't Call Me Anymore?"	12	—
