= Home (The Wiz song) =

Single by Stephanie Mills

from the album Home
- B-side: "Love Hasn't Been Easy on Me"
- Released: 1989 (U.S.)
- Genre: R&B; soul
- Length: 5:20
- Label: MCA
- Songwriter: Charlie Smalls
- Producer: Nick Martinelli

Stephanie Mills singles chronology
"Something in the Way (You Make Me Feel)" (1989)	"Home" (1989)	"Comfort of a Man" (1990)

"Home" is a song from the 1975 Broadway musical, The Wiz. It was written by Charlie Smalls and was performed by Stephanie Mills in the stage production and by Diana Ross in the 1978 film adaptation and released on the soundtrack album in 1978.

== 1989 recording ==
Stephanie Mills re-recorded the song for her 1989 album of the same name with background vocals by Take 6. The single release scored her another number one on the Billboard Hot Black Singles chart. The single was the last of five number ones for Mills on the R&B Singles chart.

== Track listing ==
- US 7" Vinyl single
  - A1: "Home" – 4:34
  - B1: "Love Hasn't Been Easy on Me" – 4:44

== Charts ==
=== Weekly charts ===
Chart (1989)	Peak position
US Hot R&B/Hip-Hop Songs (Billboard)	1

=== Year-end charts ===
Chart (1989)	Position
US Hot R&B/Hip-Hop Songs (Billboard)	32

== Personnel ==
- Arranged by Donald Lawrence, Donald Robinson, Nick Martinelli, and Stephanie Mills
- Background arrangement – Mervyn Warren
- Strings and horns arrangement – The Brothers Kerber
- Backing vocals – Take 6
- Bass – Douglas Grigsby
- Drums, percussion, emulator, synthesizer – Jim Salamone
- Electric piano, synthesizer – Curtis Dowd
- Assistant engineer – John Sullivan, Sal Viarelli
- Guitar – Randy Bowland
- Keyboards – Donald Robinson
- Producer – Nick Martinelli
- Recorded by Bruce Weeden
- Written by Charlie Smalls

== Cover versions ==
- In 1978, Andrea McArdle sang the song for Christmas at Walt Disney World.
- Whitney Houston made her world debut on The Merv Griffin Show on April 29, 1983, performing the song. She covered it several times in concert during her US Tour 1985, Whitney: The Concert for a New South Africa 1994 HBO TV special, and her My Love Is Your Love Tour in 1999. Her 1983 performance on The Merv Griffin Show was included in the CD/DVD release Whitney Houston Live: Her Greatest Performances and as a bonus on the DVD, Whitney: The Greatest Hits and the 25th anniversary deluxe edition of her debut album.
- In 1984, Mireille Mathieu recorded a French cover, "Chez Moi" because she planned to adapt the musical into French and perform it in Paris; the project was abandoned but this song appears on the double CD "Cinema" (Sony 2019).
- In 2007, Melinda Doolittle performed the song on season 6 of American Idol and released a studio version.
- In 2012, a version by Barbra Streisand recorded in 1985 for The Broadway Album but not initially released was finally included on Release Me.
- In 2023, a version by Brandi Carlile played over the credits in season 3, episode 11 of Ted Lasso.

== In popular culture ==
- Jazmine Sullivan, 11, sang the show at her elementary school performance of The Wiz in 1999. The home video clip posted on YouTube has had over two million views.
- In 2010, the song was used in an episode of Glee's first season called "Home", sung by Kristin Chenoweth.
- In June 2015, Esang de Torres performed the song in the blind auditions of The Voice Kids Philippines Season 2 and was given a three-chair turn. The performer chose to join coach Lea Salonga's team.
- In December 2015, Shanice Williams performed the song live in the Broadway/television adaptation of both the film and Broadway version of The Wiz.
- Gladys Knight performed the songs at a BET 85th Birthday Celebration Tribute to Quincy Jones in 2018.
- In 2018, Michaela Jaé Rodriguez and Billy Porter, as their characters Blanca Evangelista and Pray Tell, respectively, sang the song as a duet in the episode "Love Is the Message" of the television series Pose.
- In 2019, Glennis Grace performed the song in a concert event Whitney: A Tribute by Glennis Grace (Live In Concert) in Rotterdam Ahoy (The Netherlands) and Lotto Arena (Belgium) with her tribute to Whitney Houston.
- In 2020, Johnny Manuel performed the song in the blind auditions of The Voice Australia Season 9 and was given a four-chair turn. Coach Boy George blocked fellow coach Kelly Rowland from having the chance to be chosen as Manuel's coach, with the performer choosing to join coach Guy Sebastian's team.
- In 2025, Cynthia Erivo performed the song to open the 97th Academy Awards.

== Samples ==
- In 2003, this song was sampled in the song "Homies 2 Smoke With" by Violent J recorded for his second EP called Wizard of the Hood.
