= Never Knew Love Like This Before =

1980 single by Stephanie Mills

- Side A of the US single

Single by Stephanie Mills

from the album Sweet Sensation
- B-side: "Still Mine"
- Released: August 31, 1980
- Recorded: 1979
- Genre: R&B; disco
- Length: 5:30 (album version); 3:28 (single edit)
- Label: 20th Century Fox
- Songwriters: James Mtume; Reggie Lucas
- Producers: James Mtume; Reggie Lucas

Stephanie Mills singles chronology
"Sweet Sensation" (1980)	"Never Knew Love Like This Before" (1980)	"Two Hearts" (1980)

Audio
- "Never Knew Love Like This Before" on YouTube

"Never Knew Love Like This Before" is a song written and produced by James Mtume and Reggie Lucas, and recorded by American R&B singer Stephanie Mills for her fourth studio album, Sweet Sensation (1980). The single was released in August 1980 by 20th Century Fox Records and is inspired by the birth of Lucas' daughter Lisa.

The song became Mills' most successful song in the United States, peaking at number six on the Billboard Pop Singles Chart, outperforming "What Cha' Gonna Do with My Lovin'", which peaked at 22 in 1979. "Never Knew Love Like This Before" also charted on the R&B and Adult Contemporary charts, peaking at number 12 and five, respectively. The song was a bigger commercial success in the United Kingdom, where it peaked at number four.

"Never Knew Love Like This Before" won Best R&B Song and Best Female R&B Vocal Performance at the 23rd Annual Grammy Awards in 1981, beating fellow nominees including Aretha Franklin, Diana Ross, Roberta Flack, and Minnie Riperton.

The track received a renewed interest after the song title was used for the fourth episode of the second season of the American drama series Pose, which aired on 9 July 2019. The episode concludes with the character of Candy, portrayed by Angelica Ross, lip-synching to the song; the scene received critical acclaim.

== Composition ==
The Intro and Verse chords are [B E F#/A# D#m7 G#m7 C#m9 E/F#], cycling through the diatonic Circle of fifths in the key of B major. The Chorus section chords are [Emaj7 D#m7 C#m7 Emaj7 D#m7 C#m7 Emaj7 D#m7 C#sus4 C#7 E].

== Legacy ==
In 2023, Rolling Stone ranked "Never Knew Love Like This Before" number 19 in their list of "The 50 Most Inspirational LGBTQ Songs of All Time". In 2025, Billboard magazine ranked it number 32 in their "The 100 Greatest LGBTQ+ Anthems of All Time"-list.

== Track listing and formats ==
- US 7" Vinyl single

A. "Never Knew Love Like This Before" – 3:29
B. "Still Mine" – 5:33

- UK 7" Vinyl single

A. "Never Knew Love Like This Before" – 5:28
B. "Still Mine" – 5:34

- Netherlands 12" Vinyl single

A. "Never Knew Love Like This Before" (Disco Mix) – 5:27
B. "Still Mine" – 5:33

- Mexico 12" Vinyl single

A. "Never Knew Love Like This Before" – 5:27
B. "D-A-N-C-I-N'" – 5:41

== Personnel ==
- Stephanie Mills – vocals
- Hubert Eaves III – keyboards
- James Mtume – keyboards, percussion, backing vocals
- Ed Walsh – synthesizer programming
- Reggie Lucas – guitar, backing vocals
- Ed Moore – guitar
- Basil Fearington – bass guitar
- Howard King – drums
- Gene Blanco – horn and string arrangements
- Tawatha Agee – backing vocals, Gwen Guthrie, Brenda White King – backing vocals

== Charts ==
=== Weekly charts ===
Chart (1980–81)	Peak position
Australia (Kent Music Report)	14
Austria (Ö3 Austria Top 40)	11
Belgium (Ultratop 50 Flanders)	2
Canada Top Singles (RPM)	32
Ireland (IRMA)	12
Netherlands (Dutch Top 40)	1
Netherlands (Single Top 100)	2
New Zealand (Recorded Music NZ)	9
South Africa (Springbok)	4
UK Singles (Official Charts)	4
US Billboard Hot 100	6
US Adult Contemporary (Billboard)	5
US Hot R&B/Hip-Hop Songs (Billboard)	12
US Cash Box Top 100	8

=== Year-end charts ===
Chart (1980)	Rank
Belgium (Ultratop Flanders)	32
Brazil (ABPD)	92
Netherlands (Dutch Top 40)	31
Netherlands (Single Top 100)	28
UK	46

Chart (1981)	Rank
Australia (Kent Music Report)	60
New Zealand (Recorded Music NZ)	41
US Cash Box Top 100	59

=== Certifications ===
Region	Certification	Certified units/sales
New Zealand (RMNZ)	Gold	15,000^{‡}
United Kingdom (BPI)	Silver	250,000^{^}
United States (RIAA)	Gold	1,000,000^{^}
^{^} Shipments figures based on certification alone.^{‡} Sales+streaming figures based on certification alone.

== Cover versions ==
- In 1999, French band Organiz' covered the song. The track reached on number five on French Singles Chart, and number 6 on Belgian Singles Chart.
- Thomas Anders covered the song for his 1995 album Souled.
- In 2013, Jessie Ware covered the song for the soundtrack to the film I Give It a Year.
