= Stephanie Mills (album) =

Studio album by Stephanie Mills
- Released: November 25, 1985
- Recorded: 1984–1985
- Genre: R&B; soul; dance
- Length: 39:55
- Label: MCA
- Producer: George Duke; Richard Rudolph; Ron Kersey; Nick Martinelli

Stephanie Mills chronology
I've Got the Cure (1984)	Stephanie Mills (1985)	If I Were Your Woman (1987)

Singles from Stephanie Mills
- 1. "Stand Back" Released: 1985; 2. "I Have Learned to Respect the Power of Love" Released: 1986; 3. "Rising Desire" Released: 1986

Professional ratings
Review scores
Source	Rating
AllMusic	3/5 stars

Stephanie Mills is the tenth studio album by the American R&B singer Stephanie Mills, released in 1985 on MCA Records. Following her last release I've Got the Cure on Casablanca Records, Mills self-titled new album was the first release upon signing a new recording contract with MCA Records.

The album features R&B hits "Rising Desire", "Stand Back" and "I Have Learned to Respect the Power of Love", which was a number-one hit for 2 weeks on Billboard's Top R&B Songs chart.

Jazz musician George Duke produced the tracks "Automatic Passion", "Under Pressure", "Rising Desire" and "Just You". Richard Rudolph (husband of late singer Minnie Riperton) produced the tracks "Time of Your Life" and "Hold On to Midnight".

== Track listing ==
No.	Title	Writer(s)	Producer(s)	Length
1.	"Stand Back"	Carl Sturken; Evan Rogers	Nick Martinelli	5:09
2.	"Automatic Passion"	Karyn White; Robert Brookins; Tony Haynes	George Duke	4:10
3.	"Rising Desire"	Raymond Jones	Duke	5:57
4.	"Time of Your Life"	Rod Temperton	Richard Rudolph	4:28
5.	"Hold On to Midnight"	Temperton	Rudolph	5:40
6.	"Just You"	Diane Warren; Robbie Buchanan	Duke	4:50
7.	"I Have Learned to Respect the Power of Love"	Angela Winbush	Ron Kersey	4:51
8.	"Under Pressure"	Michael Jay; Michael Watson	Duke	6:20

== Personnel ==
- Stephanie Mills – lead vocals, backing vocals (1, 3, 5, 7)
- Randy Cantor – keyboards (1)
- Carl Sturken – bass synthesizer (1)
- Jim Salamone – Fairlight programming (1), drum programming (1)
- George Duke – clavinet (2), Rhodes (2), Yamaha DX7 (2, 6), Memorymoog (2, 6), Synclavier II (2, 6, 8), bass synthesizer (2), acoustic piano (6), Prophet-5 (6), Korg DW-6000 (8), Linn 9000 (8)
- Gary Chang – Fairlight CMI (3), programming (3)
- Raymond Jones – Yamaha DX7 (3), Oberheim OB-8 (3), Ensoniq Mirage (3), Fairlight CMI (3), LinnDrum (3)
- Larry Williams – keyboards (4, 5), synthesizers (4, 5), flute solo (5)
- Rod Temperton – synthesizer arrangements (4, 5), string arrangements (4), vocal arrangements (4), rhythm arrangements (5), backing vocals (5)
- Ron Kersey – keyboards (7), Yamaha QX-1 sequencer (7), LinnDrum (7)
- Ron Jennings – guitars (1)
- Chuck Gentry – guitars (2)
- Paul Jackson Jr. – guitars (2, 8)
- Michael Landau – lead guitar (6), acoustic guitar (6)
- John McGhee – guitars (7)
- Abraham Laboriel – bass (6)
- Freddie "Ready" Washington – bass (7)
- John Robinson – drums (2)
- Paulinho da Costa – percussion (2)
- Sam Peake – saxophone (1)
- Mark Russo – alto saxophone (2)
- Robert Brookins – backing vocals (2, 6)
- Carl Carwell – backing vocals (2, 6, 8)
- Lynn Davis – backing vocals (2, 6, 7, 8)
- Maxi Anderson – backing vocals (7)
- Alexandra Brown – backing vocals (7)
- Cydney Davis – backing vocals (8)

Production

- Stephanie Mills – executive producer
- Nick Martinelli – producer (1)
- George Duke – producer (2, 3, 6, 8)
- Richard Rudolph – producer (4, 5)
- Ron Kersey – producer (7)
- Michael Tarisa – recording (1)
- Taavi Mote – remixing (1), mixing (7)
- Louil Silas Jr. – remixing (1)
- Erik Zobler – recording (2, 3, 6, 8)
- Tommy Vicari – mixing (2, 3, 6, 8)
- Paul McKenna – recording (4, 5), mixing (4, 5)
- Hill Swimmer – recording (7)
- Joe Borja – assistant engineer (4, 5)
- Robert de la Garza – assistant engineer (4, 5)
- Clyde Kaplan – assistant engineer (4, 5)
- Magic Moreno – assistant engineer (4, 5)
- Tom Nist – assistant engineer (4, 5)
- Brad Coker – assistant engineer (7)
- Paul Howard – assistant engineer (7)
- Glenn Kurtz – assistant engineer (7)
- Bernie Grundman – mastering at A&M Studios (Hollywood, California)
- Cassandra Mills – project coordinator, album concept
- Jeff Adamoff – art direction
- Norm Ung – design
- DZN – design
- Ron Slenzak – front cover photography
- Dick Zimmerman – back cover photography

== Charts ==
Chart (1986)	Peak position
US Billboard 200	47
US Top R&B/Hip-Hop Albums (Billboard)	4

=== Singles ===
Year	Single	Chart positions		
Year	Single	US	US R&B	US Dance
1985	"Stand Back"	—	15	7
1986	"I Have Learned to Respect the Power of Love"	—	1	—
1986	"Rising Desire"	—	11	—
