= I Have Learned to Respect the Power of Love =

Single by Stephanie Mills

from the album Stephanie Mills
- B-side: "Stand Back"
- Released: 1986
- Recorded: 1985
- Genre: R&B; soul
- Length: 6:34 (album); 4:51 (single)
- Label: MCA 5669
- Songwriters: Angela Winbush; René Moore
- Producer: Ron Kersey

Stephanie Mills singles chronology
"Stand Back" (1985)	"I Have Learned to Respect the Power of Love" (1986)	"Rising Desire" (1986)

"I Have Learned to Respect the Power of Love" is a song that was written by Angela Winbush and René Moore, of the singing duo Rene & Angela. The song first appeared on the self-titled album, "Alton McClain & Destiny" (Polydor, 1979) as "The Power of Love". This album was later re-released as It Must Be Love. Alton McClain & Destiny are best known for their disco song, "It Must Be Love."

== Stephanie Mills recording ==
A version was recorded by American R&B singer, Stephanie Mills, and was the second single release from her 1985 self-titled album. The song peaked at #1 on the Billboard Hot Black Singles chart, and remained number one for two weeks in May 1986.

"I Have Learned to Respect the Power of Love" was Mills's sixteenth entry on the chart and her first number-one single. While the song was one of her most successful in the R&B/soul markets, the single did not make the Billboard Hot 100.

== Formats and track listings ==
- US 7" vinyl
1. "I Have Learned to Respect the Power of Love" (Radio Edit) – 4:51
2. "Stand Back" – 3:58
- US 12" vinyl
1. "I Have Learned To Respect The Power Of Love" (Extended Mix) – 6:37
2. "I Have Learned To Respect The Power Of Love" (Instrumental) – 6:37
3. "I Have Learned To Respect The Power Of Love" (A Cappella) – 6:30
4. "I Have Learned To Respect The Power Of Love" (Power Beats) – 4:43

== Charts ==
Chart (1986)	Peak position
US Hot R&B/Hip-Hop Songs (Billboard)	1

== Cover Versions ==
- The song's writer Angela Winbush later recorded the tune herself which appears on her second studio album The Real Thing (1989).
