= Stephanie Mills =

American musician (born 1957)

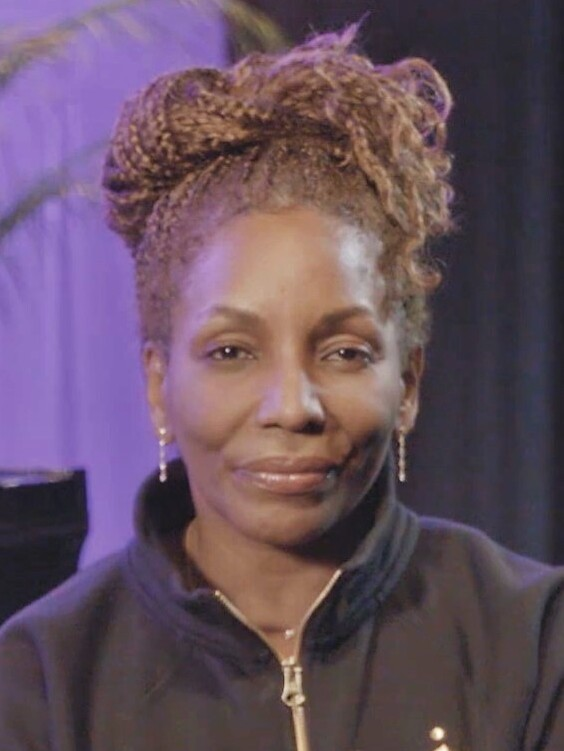
- Mills for the 2020 United States Census
- Born: March 22, 1957 (age 69); Bedford–Stuyvesant, Brooklyn, New York City, U.S.
- Occupations: Singer; songwriter; musician
- Years active: 1966–present
- Spouse(s): Jeffrey Daniel (m. 1980; div. 1983) Dino Meminger (m. 1989; div. 1991) Michael Saunders (m. 1993; div. 2001)
- Children: 1
- Musical career
- Genres: Soul; gospel; pop; disco; dance; R&B
- Instrument: Vocals
- Labels: ABC Records; Motown; 20th Century; Casablanca; MCA; GospoCentric; LightYear; Expansion Records
- Website: https://iamstephaniemills.com/

Stephanie Dorthea Mills (born March 22, 1957) is an American singer, songwriter and musician. She rose to stardom as Dorothy Gale in the original seven-time Tony Award winning Broadway run of the musical The Wiz from 1974 to 1979. The song "Home" from the show later became a Number 1 U.S. R&B hit and her signature song.

During the 1980s, she had five Number 1 R&B hits, including "Home", "I Have Learned to Respect the Power of Love", "I Feel Good All Over", "(You're Puttin') A Rush on Me" and "Something in the Way (You Make Me Feel)". She won a Grammy Award for Best Female R&B Vocal Performance for her song "Never Knew Love Like This Before" in 1981. Her albums What Cha Gonna Do with My Lovin, Sweet Sensation and Stephanie went gold or platinum, all through 20th Century Fox Records. In 2025, Billboard named her one of the "75 Best R&B singers of All Time".

== Early life ==
Stephanie Mills was born to Joseph and Christine Mills and raised in Bedford–Stuyvesant, Brooklyn. Mills was raised Baptist and sang gospel music as a child at Brooklyn's Cornerstone Baptist Church.

== Career ==
Mills began her professional career at age nine, appearing in the Broadway musical Maggie Flynn. After winning Amateur Night at the Apollo Theater six weeks straight at age eleven, Mills went on to become the opening act for the Isley Brothers. In 1973, Mills was signed to Paramount Records by Michael Barbiero, and her first single "I Knew It Was Love" was released. Mills was later signed to Motown after being suggested by Suzanne de Passe. Her first two albums there failed to produce a hit, and Mills left the label in 1976.

Mills's career took a rise when she portrayed Dorothy in the seven-time Tony Award winning Broadway musical The Wiz, an African-American adaptation of The Wonderful Wizard of Oz. The song "Home" was first performed by Mills in the stage production and was covered later by Diana Ross for the movie adaptation three years later. Mills’s commercial success in the music industry remained elusive until 1979, when she signed to the 20th Century Fox Records label. There, Mills found her niche in mainly disco music, recording songs such as "Put Your Body In It", "You Can Get Over", and "What Cha Gonna Do with My Lovin'". The resulting album, What Cha' Gonna Do with My Lovin', being Mills's first gold record.

She quickly followed the success with 1980's Sweet Sensation, which featured Mills's hit "Never Knew Love Like This Before". The single became a number 12 R&B and number 6 Pop hit in 1980, as well as reaching number 4 in the UK Singles Chart. 1981's Stephanie featured a top hit for her and Teddy Pendergrass entitled "Two Hearts".

Her 1983 album, Merciless, featured her hit cover of Prince's "How Come You Don't Call Me Anymore?", as well as the number 3 dance chart hit "Pilot Error", which was her first dance hit in the U.S. In 1984, Mills had her third UK hit with "The Medicine Song" (number 29), which also reached number 1 on the U.S. dance chart and number 8 on the R&B chart. On May 24, 1984, Mills returned to theater to star in a short-lived touring revival of The Wiz.

In 1985, Mills's recording of "Bit by Bit (Theme from Fletch)" was featured in the Chevy Chase film, Fletch, and reached number 52 on the Hot R&B/Hip-Hop Singles & Tracks chart, number 78 on The Billboard Hot 100 and number 15 on the Dance Chart.

Success for Mills had peaked until 1986, when her version of the Angela Winbush-penned "I Have Learned to Respect the Power of Love", hit number 1 on the R&B singles chart. She truly returned with her next release, If I Were Your Woman in 1987 under MCA Records, which she was now signed. The hits from the album include the title track, originally a hit for Gladys Knight & the Pips in 1971, a three-week number 1 R&B hit, "I Feel Good All Over", and "You're Puttin' a Rush on Me", to name a few of the songs released. The album reached platinum status. That same year, she appeared in the NBC TV special, Motown: Merry Christmas along with other musical artists and actors, performing the song, "Christmas Everyday", which was written by actor/comedian Redd Foxx.

Mills's success continued with 1989's Home album. The hits from that album include "The Comfort of a Man", the title track, a cover of her old standard from The Wiz and another song penned by Winbush titled "Something in the Way You Make Me Feel", which became another platinum record for Mills.

Mills recorded one more album (1992's Something Real) and a Christmas album before being released from her contract with MCA in 1992. In 1993, she once again starred in the role of Dorothy in The Wiz. This revival was also short lived, closing after 28 performances. Mills released a live gospel recording in 1994 on GospoCentric Records entitled Personal Inspirations. The set was produced by Donald Lawrence and featured a spiritualized retooling of her hit "I Have Learned To Respect The Power Of Love". Thereafter, Mills took a break from recording to care for her son.

In 1997, Mills played the lead in a major production of Stephen Schwartz's Children of Eden in New Jersey, which Schwartz has called "the definitive production" of the show. She made an appearance in the 2007 gospel TV series Sunday Best and was featured in a live interview on The Yolanda Adams Morning Show, where she mentioned that she has her own record label (JM Records). In 2008, she began a comeback with singles recorded with BeBe Winans and rapper DMX to name a few. She made a comeback in independently-releasing Born For This (released on Expansion Records in the UK) on August 3, 2004. Her first single in over a decade, "Can't Let Him Go", was released. A twin-disc, career-spanning greatest hits compilation entitled Gold was released by Hip-O/Universal Music earlier last year

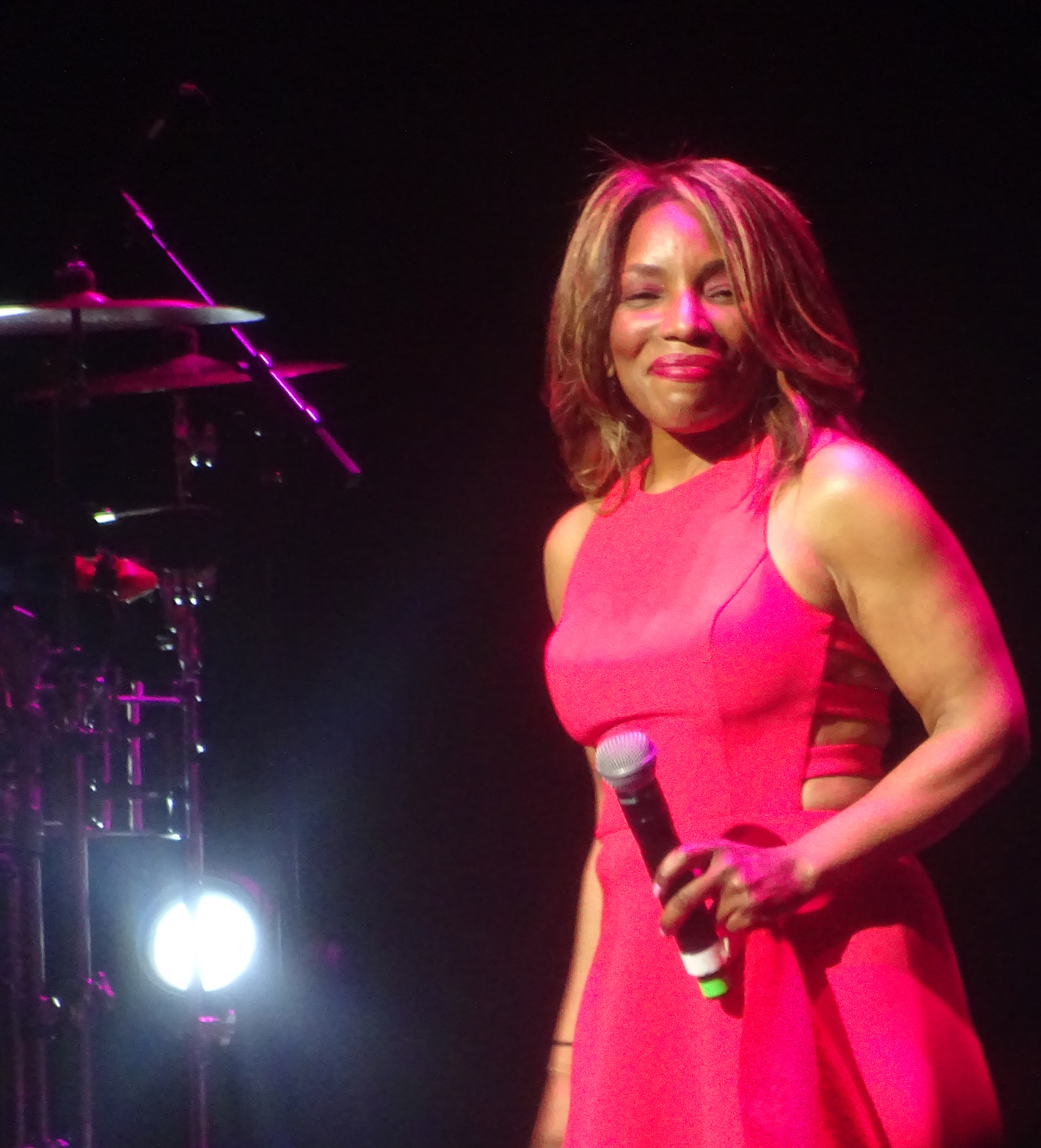
Mills on stage performing at the Detroit Opera House, 2017

Towards the end of 2012, Mills released a new single "So In Love This Christmas", available for download. In 2015, Mills was cast as Aunt Em in the NBC live musical production of The Wiz, forty years after her initial Broadway run in the show.

Mills gained media attention in 2018 with her response to singer Sam Smith, who remarked in a video posted to Instagram that they did not like Michael Jackson, but the Jackson hit "Human Nature" was a "decent song". Mills' fiery response quickly gained traction as she criticized Smith in her own Instagram responses, both accusing Smith of cultural appropriation and referring to them as a "one hit wonder".

In 2021, Mills participated in a Verzuz battle with singer Chaka Khan, at which both singers performed hits from their discography. In 2024, Mills returned to Broadway after forty years as Missus Hermes in the musical Hadestown.

== Personal life ==
Mills has been married three times:

- Jeffrey Daniel: (1980–1983), Jeffrey Daniel was from the R&B/soul group Shalamar.
- Dino Meminger: (1989–1991).
- Michael Saunders: (1993–2001), Minister Louis Farrakhan officiated the wedding ceremony.

Mills has a son, Farad Mills, who was born with Down syndrome. She also once had a brief relationship with fellow singer Michael Jackson.

Mills was inducted as an honorary member of Zeta Phi Beta sorority on January 21, 2026.

== Discography ==
Studio albums

- Movin' in the Right Direction (1974)
- For the First Time (1975)
- Love Has Lifted Me (1976)
- What Cha' Gonna Do with My Lovin' (1979)
- Sweet Sensation (1980)
- Stephanie (1981)
- Tantalizingly Hot (1982)
- Merciless (1983)
- I've Got the Cure (1984)
- Stephanie Mills (1985)
- If I Were Your Woman (1987)
- Home (1989)
- Something Real (1992)
- Personal Inspirations (1994)
- Born for This! (2004)

== Stage work ==
- Maggie Flynn (1968)
- The Wiz (1974–79; 1984; 1993)
- Harlem Suite (1988)
- Stephanie Mills Comes Home to Broadway (1989)
- Children of Eden (1997)
- Purlie (1998)
- Ragtime (1999)
- Funny Girl (2002) (Actors Fund benefit concert)
- Hadestown (2024)

== Filmography ==
Year	Title	Role	Notes
1978	Watch Your Mouth	Nadine	Episode: "New Blues"
1983	The Wiz	Dorothy Gale	Live recording
1985	The Love Boat	Tara	Episode: "Forties Fantasy"
2015	The Wiz Live!	Aunt Em	Television special
2023	Pride: Seven Deadly Sins	Birdie Moore	Television film

== Awards and nominations ==
=== American Music Awards ===
Year	Category	Work	Result
1980	Favorite Soul/R&B Female Artist	Herself	Nominated
1981	Favorite Soul/R&B Female Artist	Herself	Nominated
1982	Favorite Soul/R&B Female Artist	Herself	Won
1990	Favorite Soul/R&B Female Artist	Herself	Nominated

=== Grammy Awards ===
Year	Category	Work	Result
1981	Best R&B Vocal Performance, Female	"Never Knew Love Like This Before"	Won
1982	Best R&B Vocal Performance, Female	Stephanie	Nominated
1984	Best R&B Vocal Performance, Female	Merciless	Nominated

=== Miscellaneous awards and honors ===
Year	Award	Category	Work	Result
1975	Drama Desk Award	Outstanding Actress in a Musical	The Wiz	Nominated
1980	Young Artist Awards	Best Young Musical Recording Artist – Female	"Two Hearts"	Nominated
1990	Soul Train Music Award	Best R&B/Urban Contemporary Album – Female	Home	Nominated
1995	GMA Dove Award	Traditional Black Gospel Album of the Year	Personal Inspirations	Nominated
1995	GMA Dove Award	Traditional Black Gospel Recorded Song of the Year	"He Cares"	Nominated

== See also ==
- List of number-one dance hits (United States)
- List of artists who reached number one on the US Dance chart
