= Melva Lowe de Goodin =

Panamanian academic and writer

- Born: Melva Lowe; 1945 (age 79–80); Red Tank, Panama Canal Zone
- Occupation(s): academic, writer
- Years active: 1971–present

Melva Lowe de Goodin (born 1945) is an Afro-Panamanian academic and writer, whose work has focused on adding back the historical contributions of Panama's Afro-Caribbean people. Educated in the United States, she began her teaching career in Africa and upon returning to Panama recognized how invisible the community of blacks who were not Latino were. Joining the newly developing black movement in the country, she strove to educate and preserve the history of West Indians who had immigrated to Panama. Teaching at the University of Panama and simultaneously designing a course and teaching English at Florida State University-Panama, she carried on a dual career of activism and education until 2000, when she was made head of the English Department at the University of Panama. She has published two textbooks; a history of the African diaspora in Panama, which has been published multiple times in both English and Spanish; and wrote a widely-known play to address the historical contributions and biases which have impacted Panama's black citizens.

== Early life ==
Melva Lowe was born in 1945 in Red Tank, a town in the Panama Canal Zone to Matilde (née Wilson) and Oscar Lowe. She was the third child in a family of five children born to the couple who were first-generation Afro-Panamanians. Her grandparents, immigrated from Jamaica as laborers to build the canal and lived in the zone designated for West Indian immigrants. Soon after her birth, her family moved to the town of La Boca, where she completed her primary studies. Around 1956, the family moved to Paraíso, where she finished her secondary schooling, at the Panama Canal Company schools, before moving to the United States to study at the Connecticut College for Women. After graduating with her bachelor's degree in 1968, she went on to complete a master's degree in English at the University of Wisconsin–Madison in 1970.

== Career ==
After completing her graduate studies, Professor Goodin took a post to teach at the University of Zambia in Lusaka. The university was in need of teachers and she believed that the experience would give her insight on the struggles of African people. After teaching in Zambia, she returned to Panama and was hired as a professor of English and literature at the University of Panama. In 1974, she was hired to design the English as a second language course for Florida State University-Panama and served as coordinator of the program for more than twenty years, while simultaneously teaching at the University of Panama.

Frustrated by the lack of inclusion in history texts of the African heritage in Panama, Lowe de Goodin became involved in the nascent black movement in Panama along with Gerardo Maloney. Alberto Smith, and Reina Torres de Araúz, among others. They organized an anthropological conference to discuss how they could preserve the contributions of the African diaspora in Panama. In 1980, the activists opened the Afro-Antillean Museum, but by the end of the year, realized that they did not have sufficient funds to keep the museum open. Hosting fairs and events to raise awareness of black history among the black population, the group developed a network. In 1981, Lowe de Goodin founded the Society of Friends of the West Indian Museum in Panama (Spanish: Sociedad de Amigos del Museo Afroantillano de Panamá (SAMAAP)), to raise funds and preserve cultural and literary heritage of Afro-Panamanians. In addition, the organization, formed on the model of the NAACP, brings about awareness of racism and actively supports an end to racial discrimination and measures to gain equality. She became the inaugural president and served through 1984. She was reelected president of SAMAAP in 1998 and served a two-year term.

In 1985, Lowe de Goodin wrote a play, De Barbados a Panamá (From Barbados to Panama) to tell the story of the Caribbean migrants who came to work on the Panama canal. The drama tells of the discrimination faced by Afro-Caribbean and Chinese laborers, who built the canal and railroad, and the legal impediments which required them to speak Spanish before they could attain citizenship. The work showed the importance of bi-lingual identity to immigrant communities and how the official stance to bar them from speaking English, branded them as outsiders, even among Afro-Latino neighbors. The drama allowed Lowe de Goodin to correct the historiography of the country, challenging both the omission of Afro-Caribbeans and the myths, like they all immigrated from Jamaica and were impervious to disease, in a literary format which was in common use at that time among women writers from Latin America. The play was first staged in 1985, and was performed again in 1997, when it was also televised. In 1999, the play was published as a book, in both English and Spanish.

In 1986, she founded the Panamanian branch of Teachers of English to Speakers of Other Languages (TESOL) and became its first president. In 1999, she left Florida State University and was appointed as the Director of the English Department at the University of Panama the following year, serving in that capacity through 2006. She has published two textbooks, Practical Lessons in Business English volumes 1 and 2, as well as a history of Afro-Panamanians, which has been published in both English and Spanish, as well as in a second Spanish edition, Afrodescendientes en el Istmo de Panamá 1501–2012 (People of African ancestry in Panama, 1501–2012). The English edition of her book was released on the centennial of the construction of the Panama Canal. It evaluates the historical contributions of Panama's black citizens and how the cultural mix between Spanish, African and indigenous have led to a richer heritage, including the development of the country, as well as folklore and gastronomic traditions.

== Selected works ==
- Practical Lessons in Business English. Vol. 1. Panama City, Panama: Editorial Geminis. 1999. ISBN 978-9962-806-52-3.
- Practical Lessons in Business English. Vol. 2. Panama City, Panama: Editorial Geminis. 1999. ISBN 978-9962-806-53-0.
- De Barbados a Panamá—From Barbados to Panama (1st ed.). Panama City, Panama: Editora Géminis. 1999. ISBN 978-9962-806-54-7.
- Afrodescendientes en el Istmo de Panamá 1501-2012 (in Spanish) (1 ed.). Panama City, Panamá: Sociedad de Amigos del Museo Afroantillano de Panamá (SAMAAP). 2012. ISBN 978-9-962-05260-9. Revised 2nd edition issued by Editora Siabuste, 2016.
- People of African ancestry in Panama, 1501-2012. Panama City, Panama: Editora Sibuaste. 2014. ISBN 978-9-962-05727-7.
