= Carlos Garnett =

Panamanian-American jazz saxophonist (1938–2023)

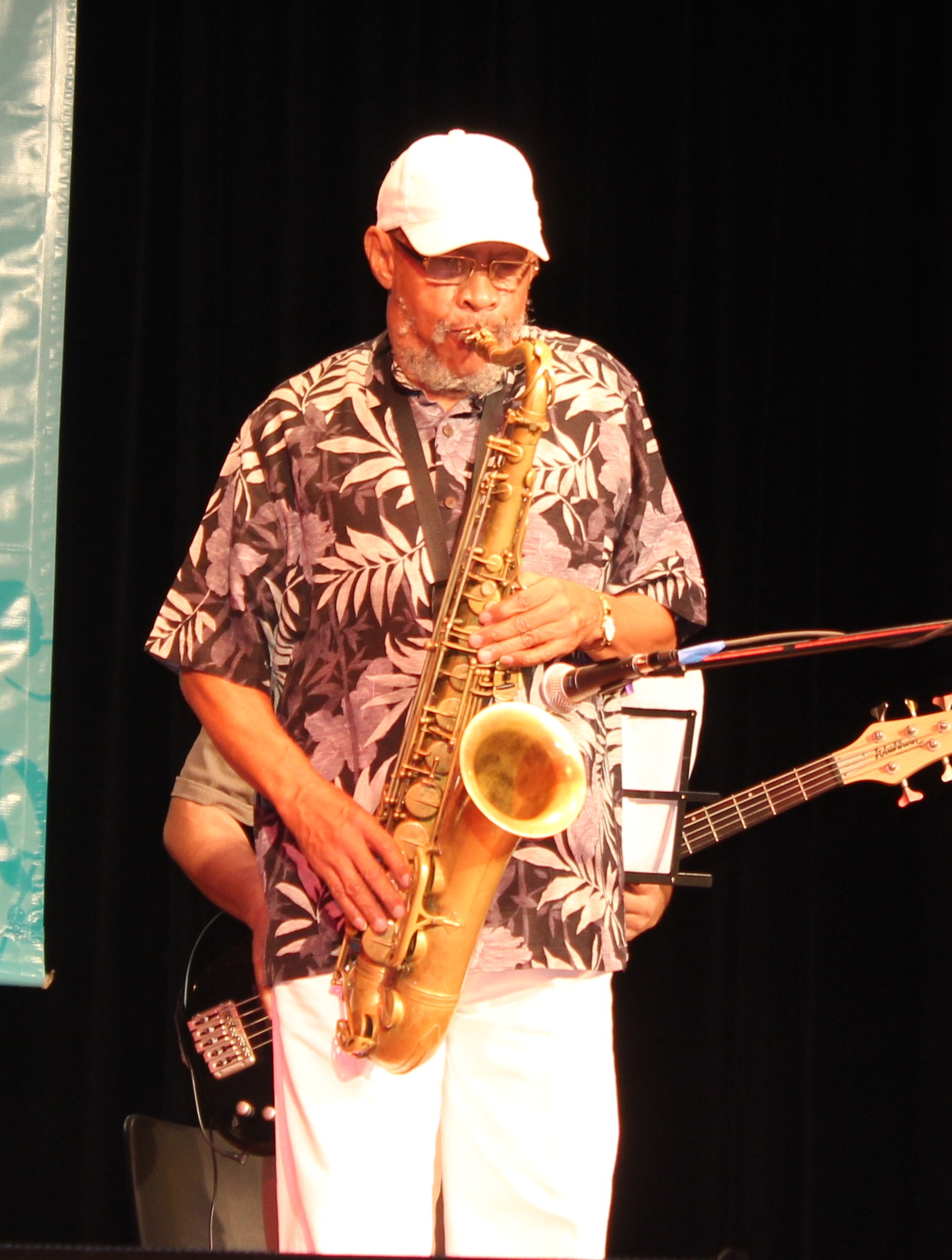

Background information
- Born: December 1, 1938; Red Tank, Panama Canal Zone
- Died: March 3, 2023 (aged 84)
- Genres: Jazz, avant-garde, spiritual jazz, jazz-funk
- Occupation: Musician
- Instrument: Saxophone
- Labels: Muse, HighNote, Savant

Carlos Garnett (December 1, 1938 – March 3, 2023) was a Panamanian-American jazz saxophonist.

== Biography ==
Garnett was born on December 1, 1938, in Red Tank, Panama Canal Zone.He became interested in jazz after hearing the music of Louis Jordan and James Moody in short films. He taught himself to play saxophone as a teenager and played with soldiers from the nearby United States Army base. In 1957 he started playing in calypso and latin music groups.

After moving to New York in 1962, he played in a rock 'n' roll group led by Leo Price. Around this time he also started learning music theory, being self-taught and having always played by ear. Jazz trumpeter Freddie Hubbard hired him in 1968 and introduced him to many New York musicians. Garnett's first recording was Hubbard's 1969 album A Soul Experiment, which contained two original compositions by him.

In the late 1960s and early 1970 Garnett also played with Art Blakey's Jazz Messengers, Charles Mingus and Miles Davis. His group recorded five albums for three years between 1974 and 1977 on Muse, notably Journey to Enlightenment, Black Love, and Let This Melody Ring On. In 1982, Garnett, suffering from depression and drug abuse, experienced a spiritual awakening and stopped playing music for almost a decade. He began performing again in 1991 and released the albums Fuego en mi alma (1996), Under Nubian Skies (1999) and Moon Shadow (2001). In 2000 he moved back to Panama.

Garnett performed at three editions of the annual Panama Jazz Festival. The 9th Annual Panama Jazz Festival in 2012, organized by Panamanian pianist Danilo Perez, was dedicated to Carlos Garnett in recognition of his contribution to music.

Garnett was invited to perform in Japan, where they were interested in his earlier "funk" music, and in Austria twice. His album Shekina's Smile was named after his daughter.

Garnett died on March 3, 2023, at the age of 84.

== Discography ==
=== As leader ===
- Journey to Enlightenment (Muse, 1974)
- Black Love (Muse, 1974)
- Let This Melody Ring On (Muse, 1975)
- Cosmos Nucleus (Muse, 1976)
- The New Love (Muse, 1977)
- Resurgence (Muse, 1996)
- Fuego En Mi Alma (HighNote, 1996)
- Under Nubian Skies (HighNote, 1999)
- Moon Shadow (Savant, 2001)

=== As sideman ===
With Miles Davis

- In Concert: Live at Philharmonic Hall (Columbia, 1972)
- On the Corner (Columbia, 1972)
- Big Fun (Columbia, 1974)
- Get Up with It (Columbia, 1974)

With Norman Connors

- Dance of Magic (1972)
- Dark of Light (1973)
- Love from the Sun (Buddah, 1974)
- Slewfoot (1975)
- Saturday Night Special (1976)

With Pharoah Sanders

- Black Unity, (Impulse!, 1971)
- Live at the East (Impulse!, 1972)

With others

- A Soul Experiment, Freddie Hubbard (Atlantic, 1969)
- Jazz Messengers '70, Art Blakey (Catalyst, 1970)
- Lift Every Voice, Andrew Hill (Blue Note, 1970)
- Understanding, Roy Brooks (Reel to Real, recorded 1970)
- What Was, What Is, What Will Be, Kenny Gill (Warner Bros, 1970)
- Terra Nova, Robin Kenyatta (1973)
- I'll Do Anything for You, Denroy Morgan (1991)
- Slammin' & Jammin, Charles Earland (1998)
- Jersey Blues, Woody Shaw (2004)
- Ghetto Child, Charley Anderson (2008)

== See also ==
- List of jazz arrangers
