= Back Where I Belong =

Back Where I Belong may refer to:

- Back Where I Belong (Tony Martin album), 1992
- Back Where I Belong (Four Tops album), 1983
