= Carlos Guillermo Wilson =

Afro-Panamanian writer (1941–2016)

Carlos Guillermo Wilson (1 April 1941 – 5 June 2016) also known by his pen name "Cubena", was a Panamanian writer and scholar who made significant contributions to Afro-Panamanian literature.

== Early life and education ==
Born on 1 April 1941, he was the eldest of six children raised by Henrieta Wilson, who was herself an orphan raised by James Douglin and Lena McZeno, a West Indian couple. Wilson's upbringing in a culturally rich and diverse environment profoundly influenced his literary work, which often explored the experiences and contributions of Afro-descendants in Panama.

Wilson's early life was marked by hardship. After the death of his adoptive grandfather, "Papa James", he worked various jobs, including selling newspapers, shining shoes, and selling lottery tickets, to support his family. Despite these challenges, he excelled academically, attending the National Institute in Panama City and later pursuing a path toward priesthood under the guidance of Father Bernard Schimmel.

In 1959, Wilson moved to the United States to study at the Catholic Seminary of La Societas Verbi Divini in Mississippi and Boston, where he learned several languages and completed his high school education. He later decided not to continue his seminary studies, choosing instead to pursue higher education. He earned a bachelor's degree from Loyola Marymount University in Los Angeles and a master's degree in Spanish from the University of California, Los Angeles (UCLA). In 1975, he received his doctorate in Spanish and Portuguese from UCLA, with a thesis titled "Contemporary Aspects of Panamanian Narrative Prose".

== Academic and literary career ==
Wilson's academic career included teaching positions at Loyola Marymount University and later at San Diego State University, where he worked until his retirement in 2006. His literary work is known for its exploration of the Afro-Panamanian experience and the historical contributions of West Indian immigrants in Panama. He was a prolific writer, producing novels, short stories and poetry that addressed themes of racial identity, cultural heritage and social justice.

Some of his notable works include:

- Pensamientos del Negro Cubena – A collection of 51 poems exploring topics such as slavery, love, racial consciousness, and socio-political protest.
- Cuentos del Negro Cubena – Short stories that depict the daily lives and struggles of Afro-descendants in Panama.
- Chombo – A novel that examines the lives of West Indian immigrants and their descendants during and after the construction of the Panama Canal.
- Los Nietos de Felicidad Dolores – A novel that explores the history of people of African descent in Panama from slavery to the modern era.

Wilson was also a founder and contributor to several scholarly journals, including the "Afro-Hispanic Review" and the "Afro-Latin/American Research Association" (PALARA). His work aimed to highlight the often-overlooked contributions of Afro-descendants in Panamanian and Latin American history and literature.

== Personal life and legacy ==
Wilson married a Panamanian woman from Penonomé in 1979, and they had two children. His eldest child became a doctor at Stanford University Hospital and his younger child pursued a career in banking.

Despite his international recognition, Wilson's work was not widely acknowledged in Panama during his lifetime. It was only in the early 2000s that he received national recognition, including the Vasco Núñez de Balboa National Medal and an award from the National Committee for the 100th Anniversary of Panama.

Carlos Guillermo Wilson died on 5 June 2016, leaving behind a legacy of literature that brought to light the experiences and contributions of Afro-descendants in Panama. His work continues to inspire scholars and readers interested in Afro-Hispanic literature and the complex histories of the African diaspora in Latin America.

== Publications ==
1. Los nietos de Felicidad Dolores (novela). Miami, Florida: Ediciones Universal, 1991.
2. Black Cubena's Thoughts (poems). Trans. E. Birmingham-Pokorny, Miami, Florida: Ediciones Universal, 1991.
3. Short Stories by Cubena. Trans.I. Smart, Washington, D.C.: Afro-Hispanic Institute, 1986. Chombo (novela). Miami, Florida: Ediciones Universal, 1981.
4. Cuentos del negro Cubena. Guatemala: Editorial Landívar, 1977.
5. Pensamientos del negro Cubena (poemas). Los Angeles, 1977.
6. Historias cortas: Los mosquitos de orixá Changó, Publication of the Afro-Latin/American Research Association (PALARA), # 1, 1997: 138–142.
7. Orixá Changó's Mosquitos, trans. La Verne Seales Soley, Publication of the Afro-Latin/American Research Association(PALARA), # 1, 1997: 143–146.
8. The Flour Boy, trans. I. Smart, An English Anthology of Afro-Hispanic Writers of the Twentieth Century. Ed. E. Birmingham-Pokorny, Miami: Universal, 1995: 41–43.
9. El niño de harina, Afro-Hispanic Literature: AnAnthology of Hispanic Writers of African Ancestry. Ed. I. Watson Miller, Miami: Ediciones Universal, 1991: 81–83.
10. La abuelita africana. Afro-Hispanic Review, vol. 2, #2, 1983: 27–31.
11. The African Grannie, trans. I. Smart, Afro-Hispanic Review, vol. 2, #2, 1983.
