= Journey to Enlightenment =

Studio album by Carlos Garnett
- Released: 1974
- Recorded: August 20, 1974
- Studios: Minot Sound Studios, White Plains, NY
- Genre: Jazz-funk
- Labels: Muse; MR 5057
- Producers: Carlos Garnett, Joe Fields

Carlos Garnett chronology
Black Love (1974)	Journey to Enlightenment (1974)	Let This Melody Ring On (1975)

Journey to Enlightenment is an album by saxophonist Carlos Garnett which was recorded in 1974 and released on the Muse label.

Professional ratings
Review scores
Source	Rating
AllMusic	4.5/5 stars

== Track listing ==
All compositions by Carlos Garnett

1. "Journey to Enlightenment" – 10:55
2. "Love Flower" – 7:22
3. "Chana" – 6:17
4. "Caribbean Sun" – 6:18
5. "Let Us Go (to Higher Heights)" – 6:15

== Personnel ==
- Carlos Garnett – reeds, ukulele, vocals
- Reggie Lucas – guitar
- Hubert Eaves – keyboards
- Anthony Jackson – bass
- Howard King – drums
- Charles Pulliam – congas
- Ayodele Jenkins – vocals (tracks 1, 2 & 5)
