= A Soul Experiment =

Studio album by Freddie Hubbard
- Released: June 1969
- Recorded: December 11, 1968 (#3, 7, 9); December 13, 1968 (#1–2, 10); January 21, 1969 (#4–6, 8)
- Studio: A&R Studios, New York City
- Genre: Jazz
- Length: 38:52
- Label: Atlantic; SD 1526
- Producer: Gil Fuller, Joel Dorn

Freddie Hubbard chronology
High Blues Pressure (1968)	A Soul Experiment (1969)	The Black Angel (1969)

Professional ratings
Review scores
Source	Rating
Allmusic	3/5 stars
DownBeat	1.5/5 stars
Rolling Stone	negative
The Penguin Guide to Jazz Recordings	2/4 stars

A Soul Experiment is a studio album by American jazz trumpeter Freddie Hubbard recorded between 1968/1969 and released in 1969. It was his third release on the Atlantic label and features performances by Hubbard, Carlos Garnett, Kenny Barron, Gary Illingworth, Billy Butler, Eric Gale, Jerry Jemmott, and Grady Tate.

== Reception ==
Al Campbell of AllMusic gave the album three stars out of five, stating "This disc pairs separate Atlantic reissues from two of the finest hard bop brass players of all time, Nat Adderley and Freddie Hubbard. A Soul Experiment finds Hubbard grasping for 1969 commercial radio acceptance with shorter songs, and a stab at Jimmy Webb's "Wichita Lineman." A Soul Experiment isn't horrible, but in no way does it represent the artistry of Freddie Hubbard." Harvey Pekar, writing for DownBeat in a contemporary review, wrote the album was "the worst LP issued under Hubbard's name" to date.

== Track listing ==
All compositions by Freddie Hubbard except as indicated

1. "Clap Your Hands" (Don Pickett) – 3:26
2. "Wichita Lineman" (Jimmy Webb) – 3:17
3. "South Street Stroll" (Barron) – 4:28
4. "Lonely Soul" – 3:03
5. "No Time to Lose" (Garnett) – 4:32
6. "Hang 'Em Up" (Garnett) – 3:08
7. "Good Humor Man" (Pickett) – 3:43
8. "Midnite Soul" – 5:19
9. "Soul Turn Around" (Walter Bishop, Jr.) – 4:01
10. "A Soul Experiment" – 3:55

== Personnel ==
- Freddie Hubbard – trumpet
- Carlos Garnett – tenor saxophone (#3–9)
- Kenny Barron – piano
- Gary Illingworth – organ
- Billy Butler – guitar (#3, 7, 9)
- Eric Gale – guitar (# 1–2, 4–6, 8, 10)
- Jerry Jemmott – bass
- Grady Tate – drums (#3, 7, 9)
- Bernard Purdie – drums (#1, 2, 5)
