= Let This Melody Ring On =

Studio album by Carlos Garnett
- Released: 1975
- Recorded: June 6 & 18, 1975
- Studio: Minot Sound Studio, White Plains, NY
- Genre: Jazz
- Length: 40:12
- Label: Muse; MR 5079
- Producer: Carlos Garnett, Joe Fields

Carlos Garnett chronology
Journey to Enlightenment (1974)	Let This Melody Ring On (1975)	Cosmo Nucleus (1976)

Let This Melody Ring On is an album by saxophonist Carlos Garnett which was recorded in 1975 and released on the Muse label. The record holds the distinction of being the first to feature a modern six string electric bass guitar (identified in the credits as a 'contra bass guitar,') played by Anthony Jackson.

Professional ratings
Review scores
Source	Rating
AllMusic	3/5 stars

== Track listing ==
All compositions by Carlos Garnett except where notd

1. "Good Shepherd" – 4:30
2. "Panama Roots" – 9:30
3. "Ghetto Jungle" (Garett, Carlos Chambers) – 5:20
4. "Señor Trane" – 7:35
5. "Samba Serendade" – 6:33
6. "Let This Melody Ring On" – 6:44

== Personnel ==
- Carlos Garnett – tenor saxophone, baritone saxophone, ukulele, vocals
- Olu Dara – trumpet
- Kiane Zawadi − trombone, euphonium
- Reggie Lucas – guitar
- Carlos Chambers, Carlos Jordan – ukulele (track 3)
- Hubert Eaves – keyboards
- Anthony Jackson – electric bass guitar, contra bass guitar
- James (Fish) Benjamin – bass (tracks 1 & 4)
- Howard King – drums
- Neil Clarke − percussion
- Charles Dalton, Diedre Murray, Howard Hall, Joe Singer, John Blake, Richard Locker – strings
- Prema – vocals
