= Silvano Ward Brown =

Panamanian serial killer

- Born: September 19, 1941 (age 85); Puerto Armuelles, Chiriquí Province, Panama
- Other name: "The Panamá Strangler"
- Conviction: Murder
- Penalty: 12 years (first murder); 20 years (other murders)

Details
- Victims: 3
- Span of crimes: 1959–1973
- Country: Panama
- State: Panamá
- Date apprehended: 1973

Silvano Ward Brown (born September 19, 1941), known as The Panamá Strangler (Spanish: El Estrangulador de Panamá), is a Panamanian serial killer who killed 3 women from 1959 to 1973. The first serial killer in the country's history, he was released after serving out his sentence on June 24, 1993, and is living a normal life and working as a security guard.

== Early life ==
Brown was born in Puerto Armuelles into a family of Afro-Panamanians, and studied in a primary school until the 4th grade. According to him, he had a wonderful childhood until the age of nine, when his father left the house. As there was now a lack of a male authority figure in his life, Brown's behavior became problematic. At some point in his youth, he had to serve two years in a juvenile prison for an unspecified offence.

== Murders ==
=== Paula Caballero ===
In 1959, at the age of 18, Brown was looking for a house to break into in San Francisco, when he came upon the house of 18-year-old Paula Caballero. After observing the woman undressing herself, he surprised Caballero, causing to her to scream "Oh my God, my mother, my God!". Using a knife he carried for cutting fabrics from doors and windows while breaking into houses, Brown fatally stabbed her in the chest on her left side. Caballero managed to take a few steps before collapsing dead on the ground. The panicked Brown ran away without looking back, but was captured by authorities, and sentenced to 12 years imprisonment on Coiba's island prison.

While in prison he was examined by José Kaled, a medical and forensic psychiatrist. Kaled predicted that when released, it was very likely that Brown would kill again. On December 4, 1969, Brown was released from prison and remained under the radar for a few years before striking again.

=== Dalila Gaitán Troya ===
On June 7, 1973, Brown left his job on the "Spanish Man" boat, and decided to go with a friend to the town of Colón. After returning to Panamá around 1:30 AM, he left his friend and began driving along Central Avenue, passing by the National Bank. At 2:00 AM, he noticed a woman walking in the direction of the Economic Development Institute (now the Agricultural Development Bank), but decided to simply move along. He continued down the intersection, turned to the old Canal Zone (the current location of the Judicial Police) and left through a street to Gorgas Hospital, opposite the "Ancón Inn" bar and old "Great Morrison" warehouse. However, Brown then changed his mind, and decided to go after the woman from before.

He found the woman, 22-year-old prostitute Dalila Gaitán Troya (AKA Delilah Gaytán Troya), on the Los Mártires Avenue, and began caressing her. Brown led her to an apartment in the Transistmica and gave her $15 in advance for her services but because of his impotence, he had erection problems. Troya wanted to finish quickly and mocked Brown, angering him in the process. He asked her to give the money back, as he felt he shouldn't pay just to see her in her underwear, but she refused and slapped him. Immediately after, Brown punched her in the jaw, and Troya slumped over on the bed. She got up, but was hit again. Brown then wrapped his hands around her neck, strangling her. When she was "more or less still", Brown took her sweater and wrapped it tightly around her neck. He then proceeded to put on his pants, wash the bloodied sheets and pillows in the sink, and then pick up the body. He put Troya's corpse in the backseat of his car, and drove to the street next to the Paris Garden, throwing away the woman's wallet and shoes onto a nearby bridge. While on the road leading to a Bahá'í temple in the San Miguelito District, Brown stopped the car, undressed her corpse and pushed it onto the road, where it was later found by a couple who were passing by.

=== Rose María Gómez Orlas ===
Only eight days after the last encounter, Brown met up with another prostitute, 23-year-old Colombian Rose María Gómez Orlas (AKA Rosa María Gómez). He took her to the same place as Troya but yet again had difficulties with his impotence. Despite this, Gómez agreed to go for a walk with him and return later. After their walk he had problems the second time as well, which ended in the woman teasing him. The now-angered Brown began hitting her in the face, before eventually strangling her with his bare hands. To make sure she was dead, he tied the sash she was wearing around her neck.

Like the previous murder, Brown undressed the deceased prostitute in order to prevent her identification, and abandoned her body in the forest, near a road connecting Chilibre and the Transistmica from the old Canal Zone. Her body was found on June 19, 1973.

== Capture, confessions and imprisonment ==
The National Research Department (DE-NI), then led by Darío Arosemena, quickly connected the two murders due to the similar circumstances. Only ten days after Gómez's murder, Brown was detained by the authorities, after they found the Gómez's sash in the back of his car. He soon confessed in detail to his crimes, including the murder he committed at 18 years old. His story was published in an article by the newspaper 'Crítica, dated June 29, 1973 and titled "Confessions of a strangler".

In a subsequent psychiatric examination, Brown was determined to be a cold and calculated individual, with a high IQ. He was also diagnosed as an amoral psychopath, mixed with a perverse sexual psyche, whose condition led him to act out his frustration in a violent and murderous way. He was sentenced to 20 years imprisonment in Model Jail, and was released after serving out his sentence on June 24, 1993. Brown now works as a security guard, and lives with relatives in the nation's capital.

== See also ==
- List of serial killers by country
