= Black Love (Carlos Garnett album) =

Studio album by Carlos Garnett
- Released: 1974
- Recorded: January 18 and 21, 1974
- Studio: CI Recording Studio, NYC
- Genre: Jazz
- Length: 38:33
- Label: Muse; MR 5040
- Producer: Carlos Garnett, Joe Fields

Carlos Garnett chronology
Black Love (1974)	Journey to Enlightenment (1974)

Black Love is an album by saxophonist Carlos Garnett which was recorded in 1974 and released on the Muse label.

== Reception ==
Professional ratings
Review scores
Source	Rating
AllMusic	4.5/5 stars

The AllMusic review by Scott Yanow called it "an interesting if not essential set" and stated "The unpredictable music overall is eccentric, sometimes overcrowded, and very much of the period but it holds one's interest".

== Track listing ==
All compositions by Carlos Garnett

1. "Black Love" – 5:31
2. "Ebonesque" – 8:22
3. "Banks of the Nile" – 4:15
4. "Mother of the Future" – 7:40
5. "Taurus Woman" – 12:37

== Personnel ==
- Carlos Garnett – tenor saxophone, alto saxophone, soprano saxophone, vocals
- Charles Sullivan – trumpet
- Mauricio Smith – flute
- Reggie Lucas – guitar (tracks 1, 4 & 5)
- Onaje Allan Gumbs – piano
- Alex Blake (tracks 1, 4 & 5), Buster Williams (tracks 2 & 3) – bass
- Jabali-Billy Hart, Norman Connors (tracks 1 & 3–5) – drums
- James Mtume – congas (tracks 1 & 3–5)
- Dee Dee Bridgewater (tracks 1–4), Ayodele Jenkins (tracks 1–3) – vocals
- Carlos Chambers (Track 4) – Yodeling
