= Afro-Panamanians =

Racial or ethnic group in Panama with African ancestry

Afro-panameños (Spanish)
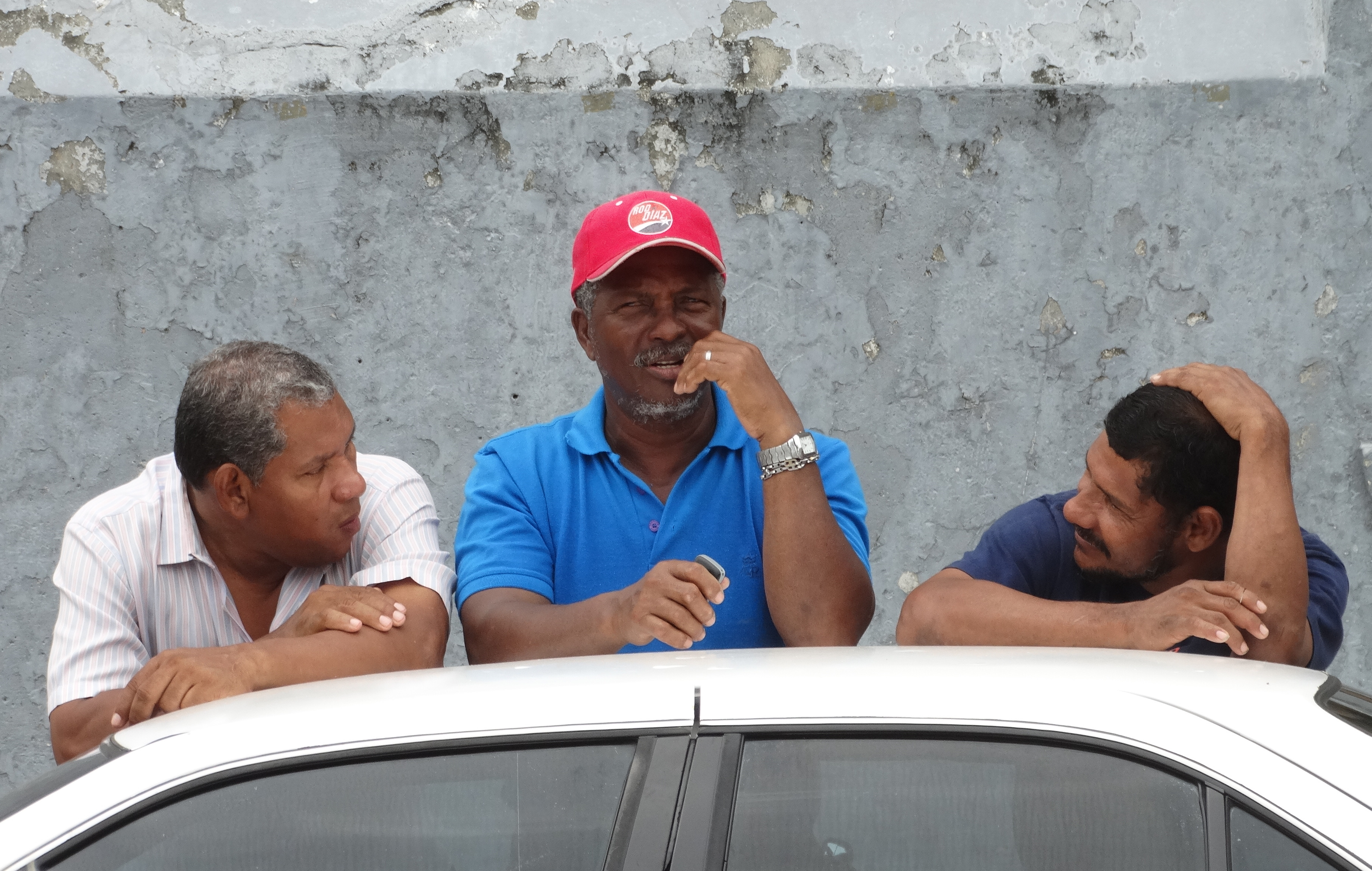
- Afro-Panamanian man in Casco Viejo

Regions with significant populations
- Colón, Cristóbal and Balboa, Río Abajo area of Panama City, the Canal Zone, province of Bocas del Toro, villages in the Darién Province

Languages
- Panamanian Spanish, Bocas del Toro Creole

Religion
- Predominantly Roman Catholicism

Related ethnic groups
- Afro-Caribbeans

Afro-Panamanians are Panamanians of African descent. They make up 31% of the Panamanian population. The population can be mainly broken into two categories: "Afro-Colonials", those descended from slaves brought to Panama during the colonial period; and "Afro-Antilleans", West Indian immigrant descendants with origins in Trinidad, Martinique, Saint Lucia, Guadeloupe, Dominica, Grenada, Haiti, Belize, Barbados, and Jamaica, whose ancestors were recruited to build the Panama Canal.

Afro-Panamanians can be found in the towns and cities of Colón, Cristóbal and Balboa, the Río Abajo area of Panama City, the Canal Zone and the province of Bocas del Toro.

== Early period ==
The first Africans to arrive in Panama came with Vasco Núñez de Balboa, in 1513. Panama was a very important territory because it had the shortest route from the Atlantic to the Pacific. Goods were taken from ports in Portobelo and Nombre de Dios, transported overland to ports in Panama City and boarded on ships headed to South America. Initially, indigenous labor was used. Due to abuse and disease, the indigenous population was decimated.

Bartolomé de Las Casas advocated getting slaves from Africa. By 1517, the trade in Africans was underway. Initially slaves were used to work and maintain the ships and port. They were later used to transport goods across the isthmus. The transportation of goods was grueling, not only due to the 60 kilometers of harsh tropical rainforest that had to be forced through, but also to bad weather and attacks by indigenous people.

== Origins ==
Writers do not have a consensus on the origin of enslaved Africans brought to Panama during the colonial era. According to the study by Martin Jamieson, some authors point out that most were from Guinea-Bissau.

Other authors say that the enslaved Africans came from the region between the southern Senegal River and northern Angola. Other scholars contend that from 1523, men and women who arrived mainly came from present-day Guinea-Bissau, Cameroon, the Congo Basin and Angola. These origins determined the ethnic-cultural core musical features of the Panamanian people. The form of communication used by Africans since 1607 (due to their songs, their instruments and their dances, their numerous uprisings - many of whom fled to settle in the forests, under the guidance of legendary figures such as Bayano, Anton Mandinga or Domingo Congo-and the conclusion of a peace treaty in 1607, which granted some freedom, but with restrictions, to thousands of former slaves), and is still cultivated by the "Congo" (a culture, and genre of Afrocolonial dance from Republic of Panama, characterized by a violent expression and erotic dancing, and is almost always associated with some sort of mime and theater, with themes of infamous historical episodes of African slave trade, slavery and the resulting slave rebellions during the time of the conquest and colonialism. Students of this culture did find parallels as their cryptolect is similar to funeral practices of San Basilio de Palenque, Colombia, who are of Congolese and Ghanaian origin. The study of this culture helps determine at least some origins of Afro-Panamanians), is the greeting with feet and talking backwards, as a mixture of European, African and Indigenous cultures. Already by 1560, there were maroon communities in Bayano palanqueras, and Cerro de Cabra, Portobelo, Panama.

Moreover, besides the slaves which some authors may have been imported to Panama from, mostly, Guinea Bissau, Cameroon, Congo and Angola (from where the "Congos" culture originated in 1607), according to Guzman Navarro, many of the slaves who arrived in Panama in the seventeenth and early eighteenth centuries were transported by French traffickers, from the Goree slave factory in Senegambia. During the period when the asiento was granted to the South Sea Company, which lasted until the mid-eighteenth century, slaves came mostly from the Windward Coast (Liberia - west of Ivory Coast) and the Gold Coast (east of the Ivory Coast-Ghana), but also came some slaves from Senegambia. In the last decades of the eighteenth century the Spanish Gaditana Company was authorized to import African slaves, although most came from other American colonies, including Cartagena de Indias, Havana, Puerto Rico, Jamaica, and the French Caribbean colonies.

=== African ethnic groups and their arrival to Panama ===
When registered as slaves, certain Africans used their African ethnicity and possible places of origin as first or last names. This resulted in names such as Luis Mozambique, Congo Anton, Christopher Sape, Miguel Biafara, Bran Gaspar, Pedro Mandinga, Anton Bañol and John Jolofo (Wolof), to name a few. This confirms the contribution of slaves from Senegambia, Ghana, Central Africa and Mozambique. Thus, the name of Africans living in Panama allows us to draw some lines on its possible origin: Mozambique, Congo and the region Kasanga, Congo-Angola, Sao Tome, the island of the same name in the equatorial region, and the region situated between Portuguese Guinea and Senegal in West Africa: Manding, specifically, gelofo/Wolof, Bañol (Banyun, established in Senegambia and Guinea Bissau), Zape (Sierra Leone), Bioho (Bijagos), Biafara, and Bran. They came through several circuits and networks that joined the "Middle America" with the economy in the South Atlantic, in which Panama and Cartagena were central ports and points of passage required for the transfer of Africans during the colonial period. On the African side, and according to Enriqueta Vila Vilar, major African ports' output of forced labor during the sixteenth century were the islands of Santiago in Cape Verde, São Tomé in the Gulf of Guinea and Luanda in Angola, confirming what Rodney Hilton called "almost exclusive relations between Upper Guinea and the middle region of America." In West Africa existed, by then, a group of Portuguese merchants called "reindeiros", who had a monopoly on the sale of captives and "selling" the right to sell slaves, of whose earnings the Crown received a percentage. The buying and selling of people involved a complex network of officials and employees installed at key points in the sales network and was articulated across the Atlantic.

While there were a small number of traders traveling from Africa to America during the sixteenth century, the fact is that it was this a small number who had direct control of large contracts to take enslaved Africans in Cape Verde, São Tomé and Angola. In this last stand Gomez Reinel and Juan Rodríguez Coutiño (governor of Angola), who lived in Panama working ranches in the early seventeenth century with his brother Manuel de Souza Coutinho, known as Louis de Sousa, the Dominican friar who in 1602 was responsible for the seats in Cartagena.

=== Afro-Antillean migration waves (1849–1910) ===
The first Afro-Antillean migration to Panama occurred in the mid-nineteenth century. The California Gold Rush began in 1849, and the subsequent attraction of wealth highlighted the need to facilitate travel between the east and west coasts of the United States. This raised the urgency of building a railroad across the narrowest point of the American continent, but the problem the engineers of the railway company faced was that Panama did not have the labor force needed to provide workers for the construction of railroad. Simultaneously, an overpopulation crisis in the Caribbean was causing labor surpluses. These two situations combined the need for workers in Panama and unemployment in the Antilles, which resulted the influx of Afro-Antillean people to the isthmus.

During the immigration of 1844, people came from Trinidad, Jamaica, Barbados, Martinique, Guadeloupe, Dominica, Leeward Antilles (Dutch and Venezuelan islands north of Venezuela), Grenada, St. Kitts, Saint Vincent and the Grenadines, etc. After 1880, the cultivation of banana in Central America was expanded, and The United Fruit Company and the Chiriqui Land Company were established in Bocas del Toro (Panama) and Puerto Limon (Costa Rica). These events again raised the need for Caribbean labor.

The third event that caused Afro-Caribbean immigration to Panama was the construction of the Panama Canal by the French. Due to the endurance shown by Afro-West Indians in the construction of railroads and projects in Bocas del Toro and Puerto Limon, the French company returned to the Caribbean to recruit workers. According to Lobinot Marrero, many of the West Indians who arrived in Panama during these years were from the French Antilles of Martinique and Guadeloupe. Between 1906-1907, Panama received more than 2,800 workers from Martinique and about 2,000 from Guadeloupe. An estimated 50,000 Guadeloupeans and Martinicans participated in the construction of the Panama Canal between 1904 and 1914. In 2014, it was estimated that there were between 60,000 and 70,000 descendants of these West Indians living in Panama.

In 1904, the construction of the Panama Canal was taken over by the United States due to the failure of the French company, again resulting in an influx of West Indian workers to Panama. West Indian migrants were drawn to Panama by the economic opportunity to work outside of the plantation economies of their home islands. Although between 1904 and 1914, the vast majority of Afro-West Indians who arrived in Panama worked a one-year contract with the idea of returning to their home islands once the project concluded. However, after construction of the canal was complete many Afro-Antillean people chose to stay in Panama. Many who remained got jobs in the Canal Zone, becoming the largest immigrant group in Panama. On the subject of Afro-Antillean Panama, Leslie B. Rout said that when the canal was opened in 1914, some 20,000 Afro-West Indians remained in Panama.

== Cimarrones ==
Some African slaves used the isolated nature of transporting goods as an opportunity to escape slavery. Many people of African descent escaped into the sparsely settled terrain and formed Cimarroneras, or maroon societies. These ex-slaves were known as Cimarrones. Cimarrones would mount attacks on transport caravans so often that the attacks became very disruptive to trade by the 1550s. The most famous of these Cimarrones was Bayano. In 1570, all Maroons were pardoned to stop the raiding. Famous Cimarrones proceeded to found Cimarroneras. Luis de Mozambique founded Santiago del Principe Cimarronera and Antón de Mandinga founded Santa la Real. It was with the Cimarrones of Panama that Sir Francis Drake alliance in 1572 in order to carry out his first independent attack on the New World Spanish colonies.

== Slavery ==
Slaves were used in many functions in the areas of Portobelo and Panama City. Most worked as domestic servants in their enslavers' houses. Some were engaged in the production of textile and dyes. Others were skilled tradesmen—blacksmiths, carpenters, and cobblers. The discovery of gold also saw their use in mining. This strong dependency on slaves saw an increase in the slave population. For most of the 1600s and 1700s, Afro-Panamanians outnumbered whites. In 1610, the population consisted of 548 white men, 303 white women, 156 white children, 146 mulattoes, 148 West Indian blacks, and 3,500 African slaves. By 1625, Afro-Panamanians numbered 12,000 and by 1630 white Panamanians were outnumbered ten to one by Afro-Panamanians. By 1789, Afro-Panamanians numbered 23,000 out of a population of 36,000. Some slaves were able to buy their freedom or were emancipated by their masters. A few free blacks were able to get an education. Some became artisans and a few became lower bureaucrats in the government.

== Independence ==
In 1821, Panama (at that time a part of Spain), sued for independence successfully. Independence brought about the end of slavery, but little changed for Afro-Panamanians. Changes did not come with independence and emancipation as was expected. Numerous race riots broke out in the 1830s, as many Afro-Panamanians were disappointed with the rate of societal progress. In 1838, Panama City had a major race riot which was quelled by the Hispanic elite. Afro-Panamanians continued life at the bottom of the racial caste system, with white Panamanians at the top. Mulattoes and Mestizos who claimed Hispanic heritage, and indigenous Panamanians were above blacks in the caste system. Job discrimination and social rejection because of ethnicity was rampant. Afro-Panamanians remained in a world apart from the greater culture.

== Antillean ==
In November 1903, the construction of the Panama Canal began. 50,000 workers migrated from Jamaica, Martinique, Barbados and Trinidad. The workers were referred to as Antilleans or derisively as chombos. Antilleans and other black workers were paid less than white workers. Discrimination was rampant. Most supervisors were from the southern US, and implemented a type of southern segregation. The presence of West Indians had other repercussions. Creoles and mestizos who had a social status above blacks were also discriminated against. These groups were deeply offended and engaged in rampant discrimination of all blacks outside the general canal locale. Native blacks began to resent the West Indians, who they felt made things worse for them. In 1914, when the Panama Canal was completed, 20,000 West Indians remained in the country. 1926 Panamanian laws decreased immigration from the West Indies and later barred non-Spanish speaking blacks from entering the country.

== Modern status ==
By the 1960s, Afro-Panamanians began to organize themselves politically, aligned with the labor movement. National Center of Panamanian Workers (CNTP) was at the center of Afro-Panamanian rights. A few Afro-Panamanians broke into the upper circle. A few were elected to the national assembly of the People Party, aligned with CNTP. One Afro-Panamanian was elected to the supreme court.{cn|october 2022} During the 1970s, they organized congresses dealing with issues surrounding Afro-Panamanians, like discrimination of the National Symphony Orchestra against blacks. In 1980, Manuel Noriega, who had African ancestry, was elected. He became authoritarian and the United States in 1989 invaded Panama and removed Noriega. The hardest hit were Afro-Panamanian neighborhoods. During the 1990s, more congresses were formed to address the problems of Afro-Panamanians, like the destruction of black property during the invasion. Also the study of Afro-Panamanian took root. The Center of Panamanian Studies was formed. The University of Panama also began to focus more on Afro-Panamanian subjects as a discipline.

== Notable Afro-Panamanians ==
- Renan Addles
- Tatyana Ali, American actress of partial Panamanian heritage
- Tessa Thompson, American actress of Panamanian ancestry known for films such as Creed, Thor: Ragnarok, and Westworld.
- Iván Anderson
- Princess Angela of Liechtenstein (née Angela Brown, born 1958 in Bocas del Toro), first person of known African origin to marry into a reigning European dynasty
- Yenith Bailey
- Felipe Baloy
- Bayano, rebel slave
- Tyson Beckford, American model and actor
- Aloe Blacc, American singer, record producer, philanthropist
- Rolando Blackburn
- César Blackman
- Rolando Blackman, former NBA basketball player
- Panama Al Brown, first Latin-American boxing champion
- Roberto Brown
- Silvano Ward Brown
- Omar Browne
- Roy Bryce-Laporte, Panamanian-American scholar
- Ricardo Buitrago
- Ursula Burns, first Black CEO of a Fortune 500 company
- Shayari Camarena
- Rod Carew, Major League Baseball Hall of Famer
- Adalberto Carrasquilla
- Casanova, American rapper of Afro-Panamanian descent
- Katherine Castillo
- Jair Catuy
- Emily Cedeño
- Lineth Cedeño
- Veronica Chambers, American writer
- El Chombo, reggaeton artist and producer of Afro-Jamaican descent
- Billy Cobham, Panamanian–American jazz drummer
- Armando Cooper
- Farissa Córdoba
- José Córdoba
- Ed Cota, professional basketball player
- Marta Cox
- Harold Cummings
- Kevin Daley, professional basketball player
- Eric Davis
- Melva Lowe de Goodin, professor and historian at the University of Panama and Florida State University-Panama
- Ismael Diaz
- Tanisha Drummound model and winner of Señorita Panamá 1997
- DJ Clark Kent, American hip-hop DJ
- DJ Clue, American hip-hop DJ
- Byron Donalds, Republican congressman for Florida, Panamanian heritage
- Olga Sinclair, renowned Panamanian painter and artist.
- Alfredo Sinclair, was a renowned Panamanian painter, considered a pioneer and father of abstract art in Panama.
- Fidel Escobar
- Gary Forbes, professional basketball player
- El General, reggae artist considered by some to be one of the fathers of "Reggae en Español", pioneering Reggaeton
- Aníbal Godoy
- Gabriel Gomez
- Freddy Gondola
- Víctor Griffith
- Jazlyn Guerra, journalist
- María Guevara
- Carlos Harvey
- Aramis Haywood
- Erika Hernández
- Ricardo Hinds
- Gwen Ifill, journalist, television newscaster, and author; hosted Washington Week in Review; co-anchor and co-managing editor of PBS NewsHour; moderated 2004 and 2008 U.S vice-presidential debates; wrote best-selling book The Breakthrough: Politics and Race in the Age of Obama
- Ricardo James
- Karl Kani, American fashion designer
- Gloria Karamañites, Miss Panamá 1980 and first Afro-Panamanian to win the title.
- Roberto Kelly, MLB All-Star and coach
- Bobby Lashley, professional wrestler and mixed martial artist
- Carlos Lee, former Major League Baseball All-Star
- Kahiser Lenis
- Óscar Linton
- Ginella Massa, Canadian news anchor
- Jean McLean
- Roderick Miller
- Natalia Mills
- Donovan Mitchell, NBA All-Star
- Uncle Murda, American rapper of Afro-Panamanian descent
- Michael Amir Murillo
- Wendy Natis
- Eusebio Pedroza, world boxing champion and member of the International Boxing Hall of Fame
- Ricardo Phillips
- Yomira Pinzón
- Alberto Quintero
- Aldrith Quintero
- Los Rakas, hip hop duo
- Karla Riley
- Mariano Rivera, Major League Baseball Hall of Famer
- Irving Saladino
- Deysiré Salazar
- Sech, Afro-Panamanian reggaeton artist
- Ernesto Sinclair
- Rachel Smith
- Brenda Smith, Afro-Panamanian/Mexican model and beauty queen; was crowned Senorita Panama 2021 and placed Top 16 at Miss Universe 2021
- Pop Smoke, American rapper of Afro-Panamanian descent
- Alfredo Stephens
- Luis Tejada
- Gabriel Torres
- Roman Torres
- Ernesto Walker
- Roberto Wallace, professional American football player
- Cecilio Waterman
- Jesus West
- Newton Williams
- César Yanis
- Alejandro Yearwood

== See also ==
- Xenophobia § Panama
