= Magic (Four Tops album) =

Studio album by The Four Tops
- Released: May 15, 1985
- Studio: The Song, Chatsworth, USA; Hitsville U.S.A., Hollywood, USA; The Complex, Los Angeles, USA; Sound Suite, Detroit, USA; Right Track, New York City; Sigma Sound, New York City
- Genre: Soul
- Label: Motown
- Producer: Willie Hutch; Reggie Lucas; Kerry Ashby; Benny Medina; Johnny Bristol; Hal Davis

The Four Tops chronology
Back Where I Belong (1983)	Magic (1985)	Indestructible (1988)

Magic is the twenty-second studio album recorded by the Four Tops, released in 1985 on Motown Records. The album reached No. 23 on the Blues & Soul Top British Soul Albums chart and No. 33 on the Billboard Top US R&B Albums chart.

== Overview ==
Half of the Magic album was produced by Reggie Lucas, which was the idea of Iris Gordy, who felt his work on the debut double-platinum Madonna album reminded her of an updated Holland-Dozier-Holland sound. The other half was handled by Willie Hutch.

Reggie Lucas produced the song "Maybe Tomorrow", a duet between Levi Stubbs and Phyllis Hyman, which received substantial urban contemporary airplay.

Professional ratings
Review scores
Source	Rating
Allmusic	2/5 stars

== Singles ==
"Sexy Ways" peaked at No. 21 on the US Billboard Hot R&B Singles chart.

== Critical reception ==
Carl Allen for The Buffalo News praised the album for “more of that earthly harmonized sound fans have come to expect from The Tops”. Bryan Anderson of the North Bay Nugget wrote “their line-up remains the same as it was when they first formed in 1954” saying the Four Tops “continue their penchant for lovelorn ballads and the more upbeat streeter-boaster pose that delivered them past hits.” Jack Lloyd of The Philadelphia Inquirer said the Tops “have lost little of the energy and polish that made them so hot in the 1960s” noting the album's song presentation in “the classic Motown pattern: upbeat numbers alternating with mellow ballads” citing standout tunes including a duet featuring Phyllis Hyman singing with the Tops. Frank Sullivan for the Times Colonist called it a “romp down memory lane” of “nice easy ballads and up-tempo tunes.”

== Track listing ==
No.	Title	Writer(s)	Length
1.	"I Can Feel the Magic"	Willie Hutch	4:47
2.	"Don't Tell Me That It's Over"	Hutch	4:34
3.	"Sexy Ways"	Hutch, Val Johnson	5:01
4.	"Easier Said Than Done"	Kerry Ashby, John Bokowski, Benny Medina	5:59
5.	"Don't Turn Away"	Ivy Jo Hunter, William “Mickey” Stevenson	5:03
6.	"I'm Ready for Love"	Lamont Dozier, Brian Holland, Eddie Holland	3:17
7.	"Again"	Fred Bridges, Lawrence Payton, George Roundtree	4:45
8.	"Maybe Tomorrow"	Roxanne Seeman, Eddie del Barrio	4:03
9.	"Remember Me"	Nickolas Ashford, Valerie Simpson	3:39

== Personnel ==
Four Tops

- Levi Stubbs – baritone lead vocals
- Abdul "Duke" Fakir – first tenor vocals
- Renaldo "Obie" Benson – bass vocals
- Lawrence Payton –second tenor vocals

Musicians

- Richard Kosinski – keyboards (1, 3), synthesizers (1, 3)
- John Bokowski – keyboards (4), arrangements (4)
- Larry Williams – keyboards (4)
- Fred Zarr – pianos (5), synthesizers (5, 7)
- Dean Gant – pianos (5, 8), synthesizers (5, 8)
- Reginald "Sonny" Burke – keyboards (6), synthesizers (6), arrangements (6)
- Philip Woo – synthesizers (7)
- John Duarte – keyboards (9), synthesizers (9)
- David Kitay – acoustic guitar (1, 3), electric guitar (1, 3)
- Charles Fearing – guitars (2, 6)
- Paul Jackson Jr. – guitars (2)
- Ray Fuller – guitars (4)
- Reggie Lucas – guitars (5, 7)
- Willie Hutch – bass (1, 3), Oberheim DMX programming (1, 3), BGV arrangements (9)
- Alfredo Washington – bass (2)
- Cornelius Mims – bass (4)
- Anthony Jackson – bass (5, 7, 8)
- Ed Greene – drums (2)
- Steve Ferrone – drums (4, 8)
- Michael White – drums (4)
- Paulinho da Costa – percussion (4, 9)
- Bashiri Johnson – percussion (5)
- Gerald Albright – saxophone solo (1, 3)
- Ernie Watts – saxophone solo (2)
- Harold Vick – saxophone (7)
- Stanley Behrens – harmonica (3)
- Gene Page – orchestration (2), string arrangements (9)
- Benjamin Wright – additional arrangements (4, 6)
- Eddie Summers – rhythm arrangements (9)
- Phyllis Hyman – lead vocals (8)

== Production ==
- Iris Gordy – executive producer
- Willie Hutch – producer (1, 2, 3)
- Kerry Ashby – producer (4)
- Benny Medina – producer (4)
- Reggie Lucas – producer (5, 7, 8)
- Johnny Bristol – producer (6)
- Hal Davis – producer (9)
- Johnny Lee – art direction
- Janet Levinson – design
- Aaron Rapoport – photography

Technical

- John Matousek – mastering At Motown/Hitsville U.S.A. Recording Studios (Hollywood, CA)
- Steve King – recording (1, 3)
- Jim Vitti – recording (1, 3)
- Willie Hutch – mixing (1)
- Bob Robitaille – recording (2, 9), mixing (2, 4, 9)
- Steve Smith – recording (2)
- Barney Perkins – mixing (3, 6, 7)
- Tom Perry – recording (4)
- Nick Spigel – recording (4)
- Joe Ferla – recording (5, 7, 8)
- Reggie Kendall – recording (6)
- Russ Terrana – mixing (1), recording (9)
