= Lisa Lucas (publisher) =

Publishing executive (born 1980)

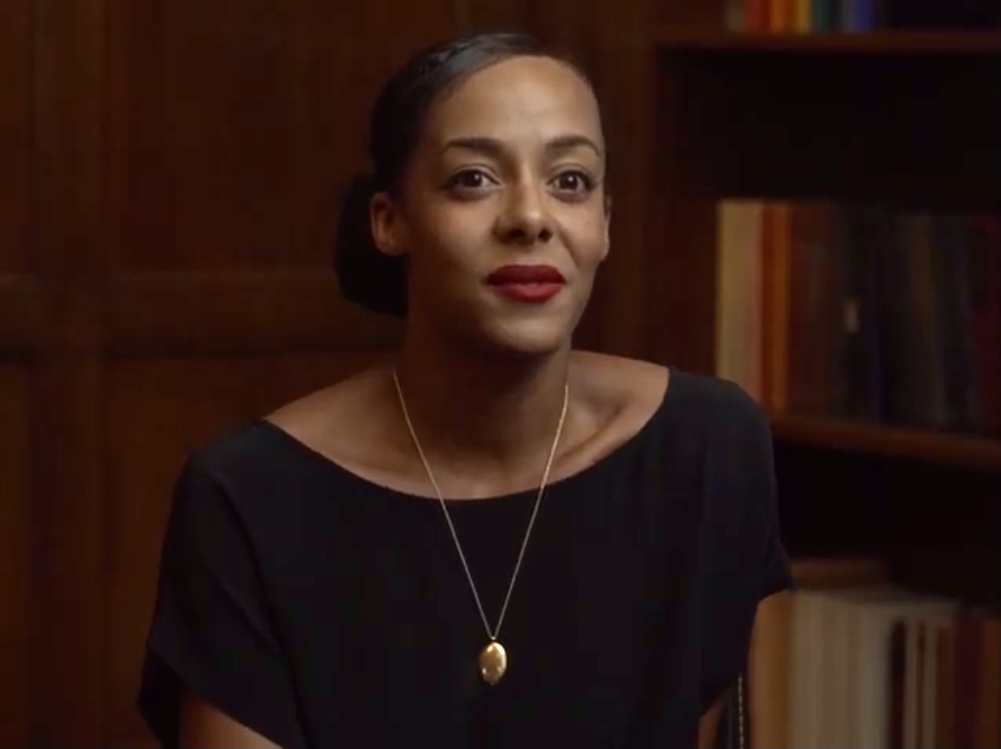
- Lucas in 2018
- Born: Lisa Lucas; 1980 (age 45–46); New York City, United States
- Education: University of Chicago
- Occupation: Executive director
- Known for: National Book Foundation

Lisa Lucas (born 1980) is an American publishing executive. From 2020 to 2024, she was senior vice president at Knopf Doubleday, and from 2016 to 2020 she was executive director of the National Book Foundation.

== Early life ==
Lucas was born in New York City in 1980 and grew up in Teaneck, New Jersey and Montclair, New Jersey. Lucas's father is musician Reggie Lucas, a Grammy-winning songwriter and producer.

Lucas attended the University of Chicago, where she studied English. She graduated in 2001.

== Career ==
Lucas began her career as a 15-year-old intern at Vibe magazine; at 17 she worked for radio station KIIS-FM. After college, Lucas worked for Chicago's Steppenwolf Theatre, then the Tribeca Film Festival. In 2012, Lucas became publisher of arts magazine Guernica.

Reporting on Lucas's 2016 appointment to executive director of the National Book Foundation, NBC said: "With Lucas at the forefront of the National Book Foundation and Awards, the future of publishing looks very bright." The Los Angeles Times said Lucas "is clearly poised to bring the organization to a new level...ideally suited" to promote the foundation. She is the third director in the history of the foundation, "one of America’s key literary institutions," and the first woman and the first African-American to lead the organization. As executive director, she has publicly discussed the importance of inclusivity in publishing and reaching young readers.

In July 2020, Lucas was named by Knopf Doubleday as a senior vice president to serve as publisher of both Pantheon Books and Schocken Books. In her time in these roles, Lucas published Nana Kwame Adjei-Brenyah’s Chain-Gang All Stars (a National Book Award finalist), signed LeVar Burton to a two-book deal, and was the first Black publisher for Pantheon, an 80-year-old imprint. In May 2024, Lucas and Reagan Arthur were removed from their roles at the company as part of cost-cutting.
