= Afro-Antillean Museum of Panama =

Coordinates: 8.9630°N 79.5392°W

- Museo Afroantillano de Panamá
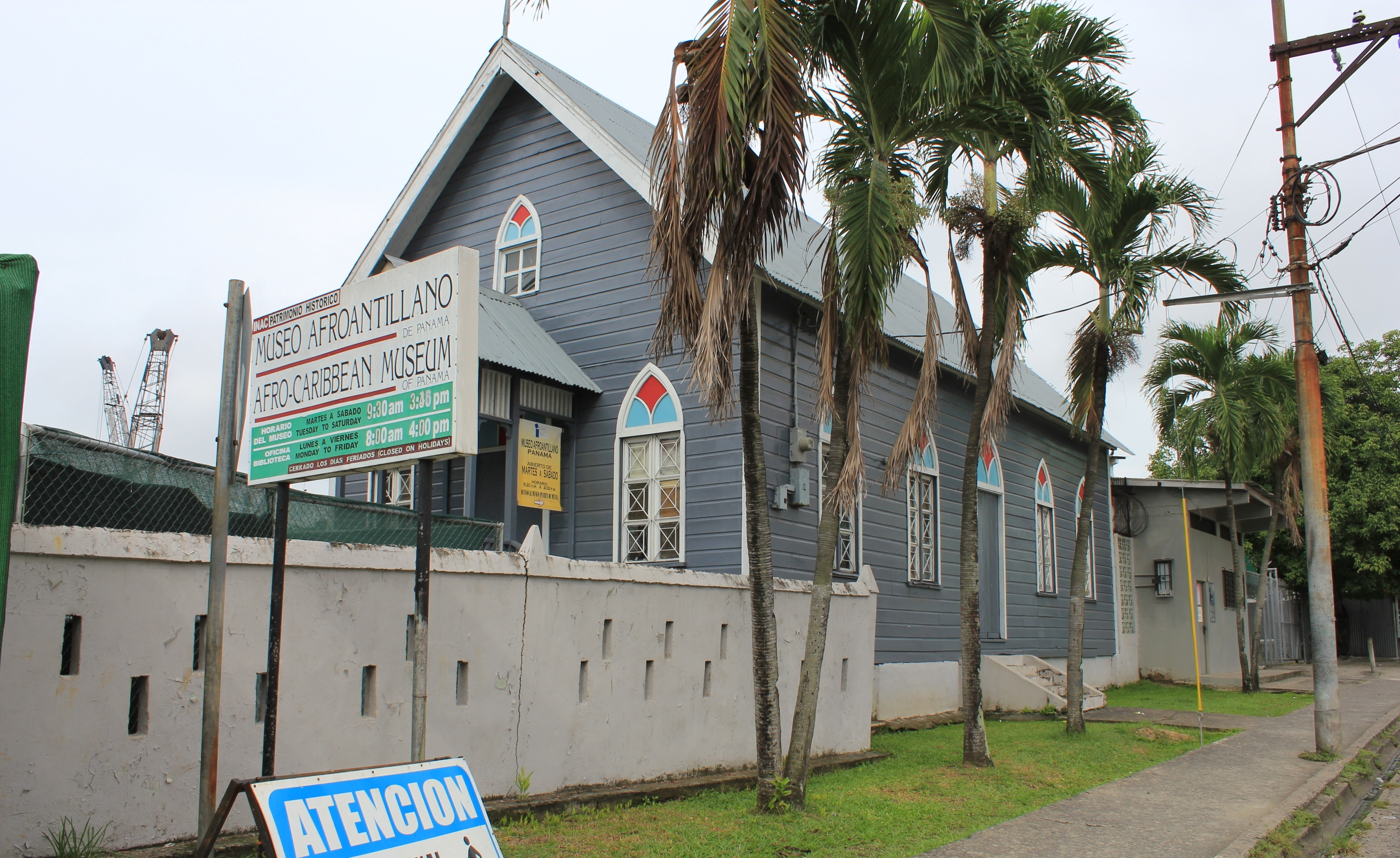
- Exterior of the Afro-Antillean Museum.
- Established: December 23, 1980; 45 years ago
- Location: Avenida Justo Arosemena, Panama City, Panama
- Type: Ethnographic museum
- Founder: Reina Torres de Araúz
- Public transit access: 5 de Mayo
- Website: samaap.com

The Afro-Antillean Museum of Panama (Spanish: Museo Afroantillano de Panamá) simply known as the Afro-Antillean Museum or MAAP, is an ethnographic museum located in Panama City. The museum was founded on December 23, 1980, by Reina Torres de Araúz in the building of the Former Christian Mission Chapel. The building was constructed between 1909 and 1910, which was the meeting place for a group of Barbadian Protestants. It is currently administered by the Ministry of Culture of Panama, and supported by the Society of Friends of the Afro-Antillean Museum of Panama.

It is in charge of spreading the Afro-Antillean culture and its contribution to Panamanian history and culture. Among its exhibits there are articles for personal use, work tools and household objects, photographs, documents and videos. It has an exhibition that explains the construction of the Christian Mission Chapel and others that show the arrival of Afro-Antilleans to Panama, their way of life and contribution to the culture of Panama.

== History ==
=== Christian Mission Chapel ===
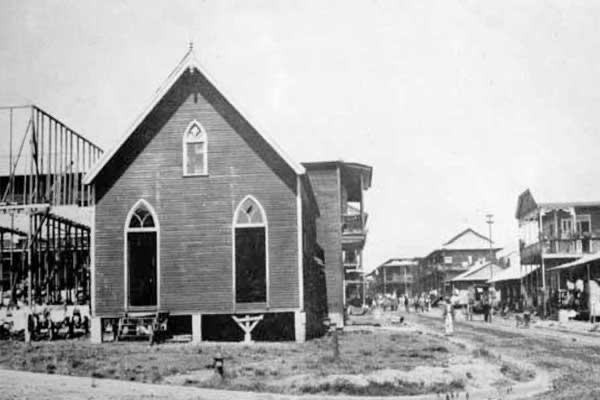
The Christian Mission Chapel in 1915.

The building that currently houses the Afro-Caribbean Museum of Panama was built between 1909 and 1910, by a group of Protestant religious from present-day Barbados. The land where it is currently located was obtained with the support of the Panama Railroad Company, in the current neighborhood of El Marañón.

The foundation stone was installed in 1909, in a ceremony presided over by Priest Beckles and Reverend Thorburne. The construction was carried out under the direction of priest Burke and the assistance of Brothers Brooms and King, and culminated in the inauguration of five constructed buildings, on January 16, 1910.

The Christian Mission left the building and moved to Río Abajo in the mid-20th century, which was later abandoned. The building was in great disrepair at the end of the 1970s.

=== Museum ===
On December 23, 1980, the museum was inaugurated in the building of the Chapel of the Christian Mission, by Dr. Reina Torres de Araúz, founder of many of the museums administered by the Ministry of Culture, former National Institute of Culture (INAC).

The current museum building became part of the cultural heritage of the National Institute of Culture through Law 43 of 2017 that, among other provisions, authorized the National Mortgage Bank to transfer to INAC, free of charge, a plot of 2,408.93 m², which contains to the MAAP building, its garden and outbuildings. The Society of Friends of the Afro-Antillean Museum has taken steps to promote the segregation and transfer of the land since 2010.

== Collections ==
The collection at its foundation consisted mainly of photographs from different times. The altar in the chapel, dating from 1910, was an important element of the exhibition. At present, the museum consists of two domestic dioramas with a bedroom and a kitchen that show the Afro-Antillean daily life and clothing. There is also one that represents a work scene during the excavation of the Panama Canal, which consists of a section of track and a metal dump truck.

The museum also has an administrative area for the sale of thematic books, souvenirs and orientation for visitors. The central space consists of panels with historical photographs, mannequins, machines, scale models of the wooden rental houses characteristic of the late 19th to mid-20th century, and historical furniture, especially from the time of the construction of the Canal. In addition, there is a luggage trunk and a shopping coupon book to be used in the commissariats of the Silver Roll.

== Bibliography ==
- Osorio, Katti (2013). "El edificio del Museo Afroantillano de Panamá" [The building of the Afro-Antillean Museum of Panama]. Revista Canto Rodado (in Spanish) (8): 133–153. ISSN 1818-2917.
