= Roy Bryce-Laporte =

Panamanian American sociologist

Roy Simon Bryce-Laporte
- Born: Roy Laporte; September 7, 1933; Panama City
- Died: July 31, 2012 (aged 78); Sykesville, Maryland
- Occupation: Academic

Roy Simon Bryce-Laporte (born Roy Laporte; September 7, 1933 in Panama City – July 30, 2012 in Sykesville, Maryland) was a sociologist who established one of the first African-American studies departments.

== Biography ==
Roy Simon Laporte was born and raised in the Republic of Panama, in a family of mixed West Indian and African ancestry.

Bryce-Laporte attended the University of Panama, earning an associate degree, before earning bachelor's and master's degrees from the University of Nebraska–Lincoln and studying at the University of Puerto Rico. He completed a Ph.D. in sociology at UCLA.

He taught at Hunter College at CUNY and then at Yale, before becoming the founding director of Yale's department of African-American studies, established in 1969. The Yale department's approach to African-American studies, and Bryce-Laporte's as well, centered not just on African-American history in the United States but on African experience in the entire Western hemisphere (the hemispheric studies approach) and what has come to be called the African diaspora. Bryce-Laporte's research centered on the experiences of Black immigrants in the United States.

After Yale, Bryce-Laporte taught at a variety of institutions including College of Staten Island at CUNY, Syracuse University, Catholic University of America, Howard University, University of Pennsylvania, and Colorado College. He was the founding director of Smithsonian Institution's Research Institute on Immigration and Ethnic Studies. In 1989 Bryce-Laporte joined the faculty at Colgate University as John D. and Catherine T. MacArthur Professor of Sociology and Anthropology, and director of its Africana and Latin American studies program.

He was married to Dorotea Lowe Bryce and companions with Marian D. Holness, and parented three children.

== Notable writings, exhibitions, etc. ==
- 1986, curator, "Give Me Your Tired, Your Poor...?", first shown at the Schomburg Center for Research in Black Culture, New York Public Library (exhibition on black voluntary immigration to the United States, in observance of the centennial of the Statue of Liberty
- Bryce-Laporte, "Black Immigrants: The Experience of Invisibility and Inequality", Journal of Black Studies, v.3, pp. 20–56 (1972)
- Testimony on Immigration before the US House Select Committee on Population (1978)
- Testimony on the Immigration Reform and Control Act of 1982, before the US House Committee on Post Office and Civil Service, Subcommittee on Census and Population (1983)

== Awards ==
- Danforth Fellowship
- "Man of the Year", Panamanian Council of New York City
- Afro-Latino Institute award
- Distinguished Service Award, Yale Alumni Association
