= Red Tank, Panama =

Former settlement in the Panama Canal Zone

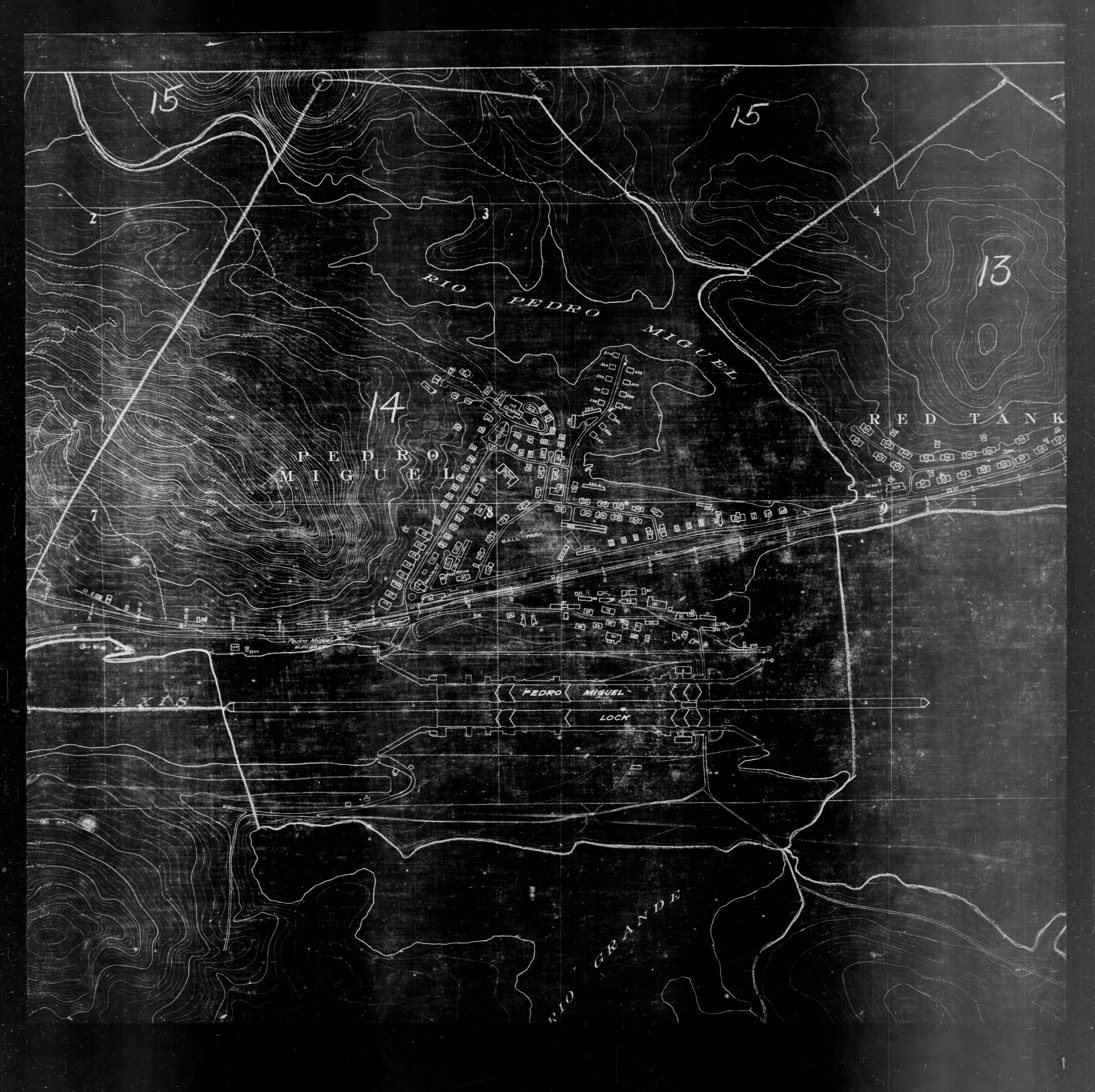

Red Tank was a settlement in the Panama Canal Zone just east of Pedro Miguel on north side of Highway 852 (Av Omar Torrijos Herrera) and east bank of Rio Pedro Miguel. The first quarters were constructed at the site in 1916 for employees of the canal, and in that year the census reported 242 people living at the site. In 1917 more quarters and a hospital ward were erected at the site. By 1925 the population of the site had increased to 1,672. The settlement greatly increased in population in the years immediately preceding and just after world war two. A major fire burned down the clubhouse of the settlement in 1946, forcing it to relocate to the school of the settlement. The population of the settlement began to decline in 1949, and the hospital was demolished in 1951. A census of the settlement in 1953 showed it having a population of over 1,000 people. The racially-segregated "colored" school at the site was re-located to Paraíso in 1953. By December 1954 the site of the town had become a teak plantation. Red Tank's population in 1960 was 1,949.

The settlement was the birth place of the US jazz musician Carlos Garnett.
