= Saturday Night Special (album) =

Studio album by Norman Connors
- Released: 1975
- Recorded: May 1975
- Studio: Wally Heider Studios, San Francisco, California
- Genre: Soul, jazz, jazz fusion
- Label: Buddah
- Producer: Skip Drinkwater

Norman Connors chronology
| Slewfoot (1974) | Saturday Night Special (1975) | You Are My Starship (1976) |

Professional ratings
Review scores
| Source | Rating |
|---|---|
| Allmusic | 3/5 stars |

Saturday Night Special is an album by the Philadelphia, Pennsylvania jazz drummer Norman Connors.

== Track listing ==
1. "Saturday Night Special" (Reggie Lucas) 5:10
2. "Dindi" (Antônio Carlos Jobim, Vinicius de Moraes) 6:00 Lead Vocals – Jean Carn
3. "Maiden Voyage" (Herbie Hancock) 6:30
4. "Valentine Love" (Michael Henderson) 3:45 Lead Vocals – Michael Henderson & Jean Carn
5. "Akia" (Kevin Nance, Onaje Allan Gumbs) 3:45
6. "Skin Diver" (Dwight Carson, Harry Whitaker) 6:55 Lead Vocals – Jean Carn
7. "Kwasi" (Norman Connors, Onaje Allan Gumbs) 4:30

== Personnel ==
- Norman Connors - drums
- Michael Henderson - bass, vocals
- Reggie Lucas - electric guitar
- Herbie Hancock - piano
- Buster Williams - double bass
- Robert King - acoustic guitar
- Bernie Krause - Moog synthesizer
- Hubert Eaves III - electric piano, organ, piano, Clavinet
- Onaje Allan Gumbs - piano, electric piano, organ, synthesizer
- Eddie Henderson - trumpet, flugelhorn
- David Subke, William O. Murphy, Jr. - flute
- Gary Bartz - alto saxophone, soprano saxophone
- Carlos Garnett - tenor saxophone
- Myra Bucky, Nathan Rubin - violin
- Nancy Ellis - viola
- Terry Adams - cello
- Bill Summers - additional percussion
- Ken Nash - congas, cuica (quica), percussion (Indonesian temple shakers, African, Asian and Latin American hand percussion)
- Jean Carn - vocals

== Charts ==
| Year | Album | Chart positions | | |
| Year | Album | US | US R&B | Jazz Albums |
|---|---|---|---|---|
| 1975 | Saturday Night Special | 150 | 35 | 18 |

=== Singles ===
| Year | Single | Chart positions | |
| Year | Single | US | US R&B |
|---|---|---|---|
| 1976 | "Valentine Love" | 97 | 10 |
