= Goodin =

Goodin is a surname. Notable people with the surname include:

- Brett Goodin (born 1985), New Zealand rugby player
- John R. Goodin (1836–1885), American politician
- Peggy Goodin (1923–1983), American novelist
- Stephen Goodin (born 1988), American football player
- Terry Goodin (born 1966), American politician
- Vern Goodin (1892–1971), American politician
