= Back Where I Belong (Four Tops album) =

Studio album by Four Tops
- Released: October 6, 1983
- Studios: Hitsville U.S.A., Hollywood, California, US; Jennifudy Studios, North Hollywood, California; Ocean Way, Hollywood, California, US; Quad Teck; Sound Suite, Detroit, Michigan, US; Village Recorder, Los Angeles, California, US; Westlake, Los Angeles, California, US
- Genre: Soul
- Length: 35:41
- Label: Motown
- Producers: Gil Askey; Mel Bolton; Lamont Dozier; Berry Gordy; Brian Holland; Eddie Holland; Bob Kayli; Marilyn McLeod

Four Tops chronology
One More Mountain (1982)	Back Where I Belong (1983)	Magic (1985)

Back Where I Belong is the twenty-first studio album by American soul music vocal group Four Tops, released on October 6, 1983, by Motown.

== Recording and release ==
This album marked a return to the label for the group who released a string of albums for other labels in the 1970s and 1980s and a failed experiment at trying to reunite with songwriting team Holland–Dozier–Holland in 1978. The trio wrote and produced half of the songs on this album, marking their first collaboration in a decade and the last one that all three would participate in together. In Lamont Dozier's memoir 2019 memoir How Sweet It Is, he recounts that the sessions were pleasant, but administrative and legal issues related to rights interfered with his ability to participate in future work with Motown and he alleges that the label consequently refused to promot Back Where I Belong, even though "I Just Can't Walk Away" was a minor hit. The Tops also appeared on the special Motown 25: Yesterday, Today, Forever and collaborated with fellow Motown artists The Temptations on this release and a subsequent tour.

== Reception ==
Editors at AllMusic Guide scored this release 2.5 out of five stars, with reviewer Andrew Hamilton noting an inconsistency in the songwriting, summing up "overall, the Four Tops are more mellow and subdued here than in the past". The 1992 edition of The Rolling Stone Album Guide also rated this release 2.5 out of five stars.

== Track listing ==
1. "Make Yourself Right at Home" (Lamont Dozier, Brian Holland, and Eddie Holland) – 4:06
2. "I Just Can't Walk Away" (Holland–Dozier–Holland) – 4:19
3. "Sail On" (Holland–Dozier–Holland) – 4:14
4. "Back Where I Belong" (Holland–Dozier–Holland) – 4:45
5. "What Have We Got to Lose" (Berry Gordy, Jr. and Willie Hutch) – 4:54
6. "The Masquerade Is Over" (Herbert Magidson and Allie Wrubel) – 4:28
7. "Body & Soul" (Mel Bolton and Marilyn McLeod) – 4:15
8. "Hang" (Bolton and McLeod) – 4:28

== Personnel ==
Four Tops

- Renaldo Benson – bass vocals
- Abdul Fakir –first tenor vocals
- Lawrence Payton – second tenor vocals
- Levi Stubbs – lead baritone vocals, vocal arrangement

Additional personnel

- David Alexander – photography
- Gil Askey – arrangement on "The Masquerade Is Over", production on "The Masquerade Is Over"
- John Barnes – keyboards, synthesizer, rhythm arrangement on "Make Yourself Right at Home", "I Just Can't Walk Away", "Sail On", and "Back Where I Belong"; synthesizer programming on "Make Yourself Right at Home", "I Just Can't Walk Away", "Sail On", and "Back Where I Belong"
- Alvino M. Bennett – drums, percussion
- Mel Bolton – guitar, rhythm arrangement on "Body & Soul" and "Hang", production on "Body & Soul" and "Hang"
- Kenneth Burke – bass guitar
- Pat Burnette – engineering
- Ian Campbell – design
- Ananias "Thrasher" Chambers – percussion
- Rick Clifford – engineering
- Paulinho Da Costa – percussion
- Richard Davis – production coordination on "Make Yourself Right at Home", "I Just Can't Walk Away", "Sail On", and "Back Where I Belong"
- Lamont Dozier – production on "Make Yourself Right at Home", "I Just Can't Walk Away", "Sail On", and "Back Where I Belong"
- Reggie Dozier – engineering
- Gene Estes – percussion
- Aretha Franklin – vocal duet on "What Have We Got to Lose"
- Berry Gordy – production on "The Masquerade Is Over", executive production
- Donald Griffin – guitar
- John Harrison – engineering
- Brian Holland – production on "Make Yourself Right at Home", "I Just Can't Walk Away", "Sail On", and "Back Where I Belong"
- Eddie Holland – production on "Make Yourself Right at Home", "I Just Can't Walk Away", "Sail On", and "Back Where I Belong"
- Paul Humphrey – drums
- Willie Hutch – bass guitar, rhythm arrangement on "What Have We Got to Lose"
- James Jamerson, Jr. – bass guitar
- Bob Kayli – production on "Body & Soul" and "Hang"
- Harry Kim – horn arrangement on "Body & Soul" and "Hang", string arrangement on "Body & Soul" and "Hang"
- David Kitay – guitar
- Richard Kosinski – keyboards, synthesizer
- Johnny Lee – art direction
- Jeremy Lubbock – string arrangement on "Make Yourself Right at Home", "I Just Can't Walk Away", "Sail On", and "Back Where I Belong"
- John Matousek – engineering
- Marilyn McLeod – keyboards, synthesizer, rhythm arrangement on "Body & Soul" and "Hang", production on "Body & Soul" and "Hang"
- A. Delaney McQuaig – guitar
- Alan Oldfield – keyboards, synthesizer
- Gene Page – string arrangement on "What Have We Got to Lose"
- Perry Peyton – percussion
- Darryl K. Roberts – keyboards, synthesizer, rhythm arrangement on "Body & Soul" and "Hang"
- Bob Robitaille – engineering
- Allen Sides – engineering
- Ray Singleton – project management, project coordination
- Steve Smith – engineering
- Eddie "Klunis" Summers – percussion
- The Temptations – vocals on "Hang"
  - Melvin Franklin – vocals
  - Richard Street – vocals
  - Ron Tyson – vocals
  - Otis Williams – vocals
  - Dennis Edwards – vocals
- Russ Terrana – engineering
- Mike Thompson – keyboards, synthesizer
- Gabe Veltri – engineering
- Al Viola – guitar
- Warren Woods – engineering

== Chart performance ==
Sales on Back Where I Belong were lower than expected by the group and it reached 47 on the R&B charts.

== See also ==
- List of 1983 albums
