= Reina Torres de Araúz =

Panamanian anthropologist (1932–1982)

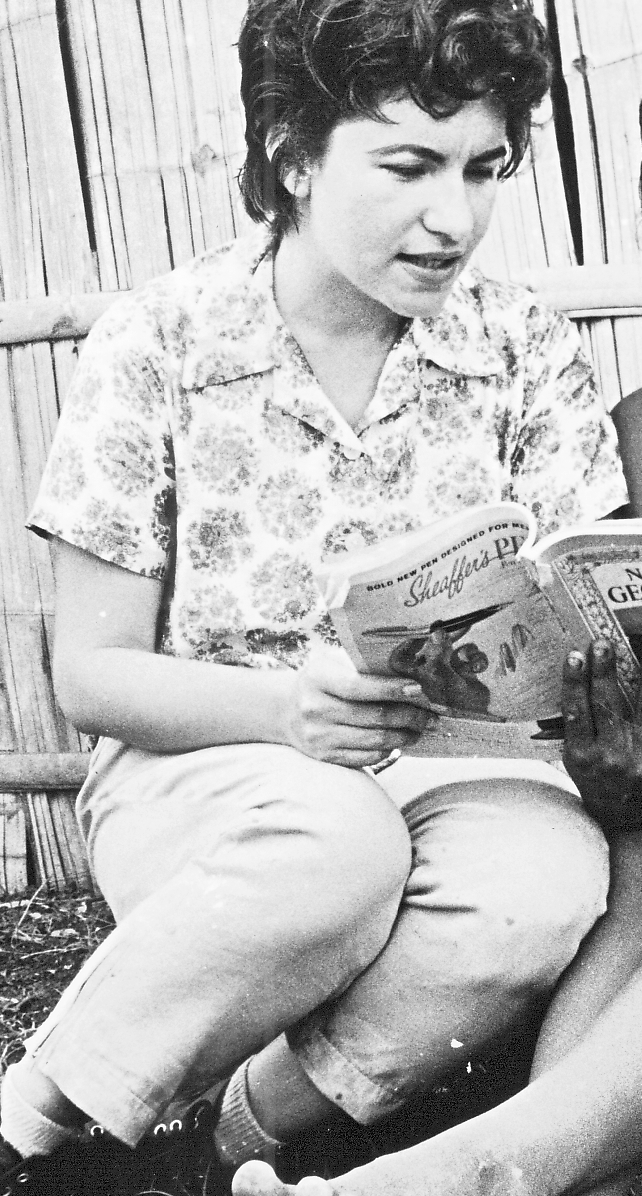
- circa 1960
- Born: Reina Cristina Torres Pérez; 30 October 1932; Panama City, Panama
- Died: 26 February 1982 (aged 49); Panama City, Panama
- Occupations: Anthropologist, ethnographer and professor
- Spouse: Amado Araúz
- Children: 3

Reina Cristina Torres de Araúz (née Torres Pérez; 30 October 1932 – 26 February 1982) was a prominent Panamanian anthropologist, ethnographer and professor. She is considered to be a "tireless defender" of Panamanian heritage ethnography.

== Biography ==
=== Early life ===
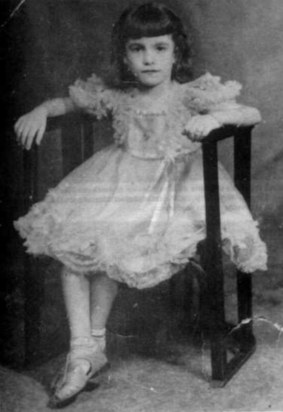
Reina Cristina Torres when she was 5 years old

Reina Torres de Araúz was born on October 30, 1932, in Panama City. She studied at the Normal School in the Veraguas Province, and later went to the Lyceum for Young Ladies and finally got her degree at the National Institute in Panama City. De Araúz studied philosophy and majored in anthropology at the University of Buenos Aires, where she earned her doctorate in 1963. She also received titles from the university as their anthropologist, ethnographer, professor of history and technical museums. De Araúz's doctoral thesis published in 1962, was on Panama and Colombia's culture and their inhabitants, and is considered an important reference on the subject. She was fluent in five languages, including Ancient Greek and Latin.

=== Career ===
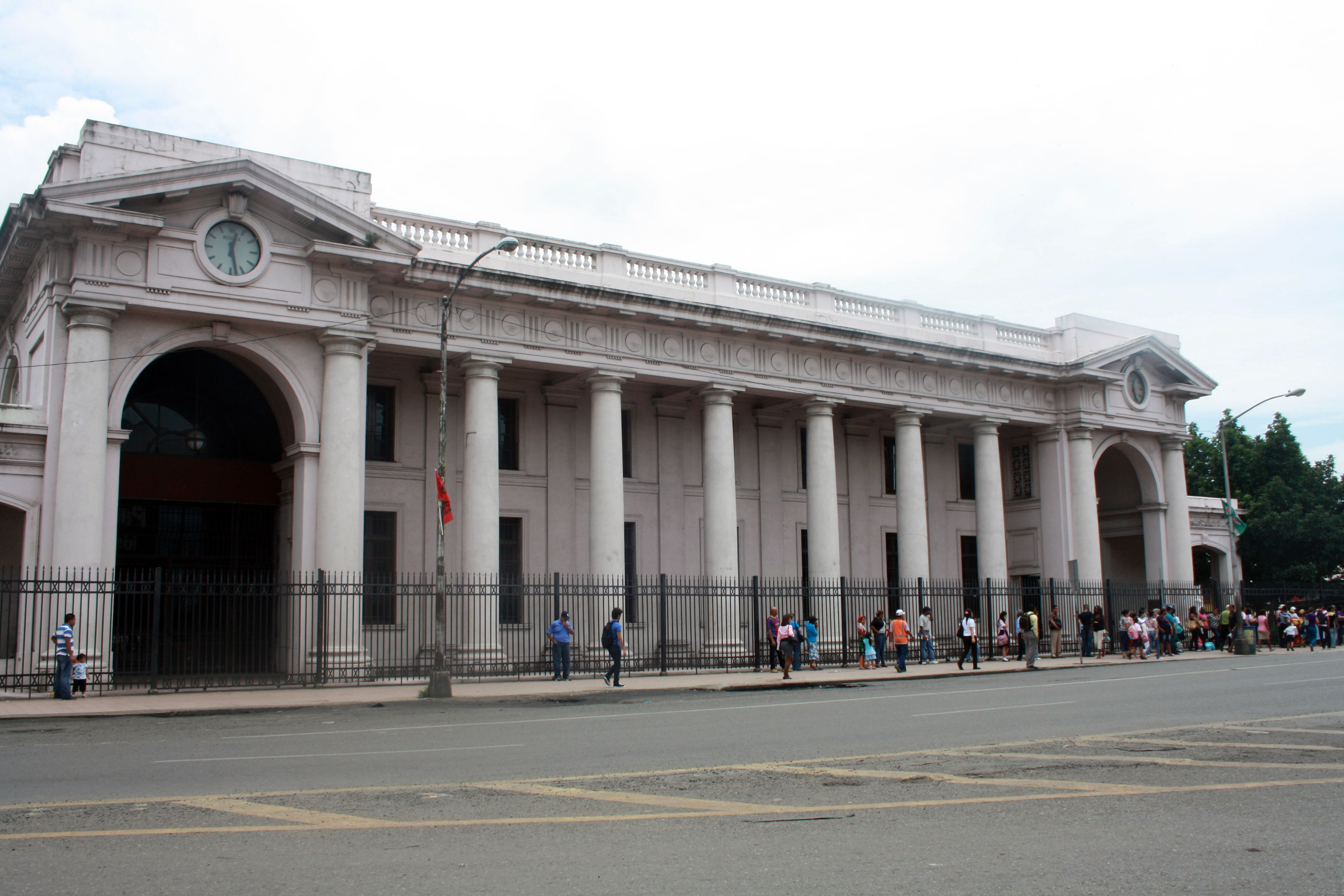
Reina Torres de Araúz Anthropological Museum, Panama City

De Araúz focused on the study of the characteristics of indigenous Panamanians in their own environment, through field visits in jungles and mountains of Panama in a theoretical and documentary research work that allowed her to create a written and photographic record that detailed the idiosyncrasy, religious beliefs, sports games, dances, songs and music of these peoples. The preservation of the indigenous peoples of Panama became her main focus throughout her professional life.

She was the professor of anthropology at the National Institute and the University of Panama. With the latter she founded the Center for Anthropological Research and promoted the creation of the National Commission of Archaeology and Historic Monuments. This commission was the seed of the National Historical Heritage and was created within the National Institute of Culture, where De Araúz served as its director for a decade. In the period she was in charge of the National Historical Heritage, De Araúz promoted the adoption of Law 14 5 May 1982, which dictates and manages the custody, conservation and management of the Heritage of the Nation.

De Araúz was elected UNESCO's Vice President of the World Heritage Committee and worked in the Coordination of the Multinational Technical Committee on Culture. In her career as a teacher and researcher, in 1974, the Panamanian Academy of History formally distinguished her as a Full Member of the institution, the first Panamanian woman to receive this honour. She promoted the creation of several museums such as the Museum of the Archaeological Park El Caño in the Coclé Province, the Museum of the nationality of the Villa de Los Santos, the Museum of Colonial Religious Art, the West Indian Museum of Panama, the Museum Natural Science and History Museum of Panama.

=== Struggle to preserve Panamanian heritage ===
De Araúz denounced the illegal removal of archaeological evidence from the sites where there were remains of indigenous cultures. She wrote to several American museums, personally requesting that Panamanian archaeological evidence be returned to their original sites. In 1979, two years after the Torrijos–Carter Treaties were signed, the then Governor of the Panama Canal Zone, Harold Parfitt ordered the removal of the locomotive 299, part of the first transcontinental railroad (Panama Canal Railway), and the locomotive was sent to an industrial museum in New Jersey. The locomotive had previously been included in the national heritage and its donation to the museum in New Jersey had been negotiated only a year earlier, when the treaties were in force. The situation angered De Araúz, who had made it known to the Zonian authorities their intentions to keep the locomotive in Panama. She described the actions of Parfitt as "a flagrant violation of all international instruments on the heritage of humanity, and is painfully, at this moment we are close to the implementation of the Treaty, an effective denial statements joint ratification of the total Panamanian sovereignty."

== Personal life ==
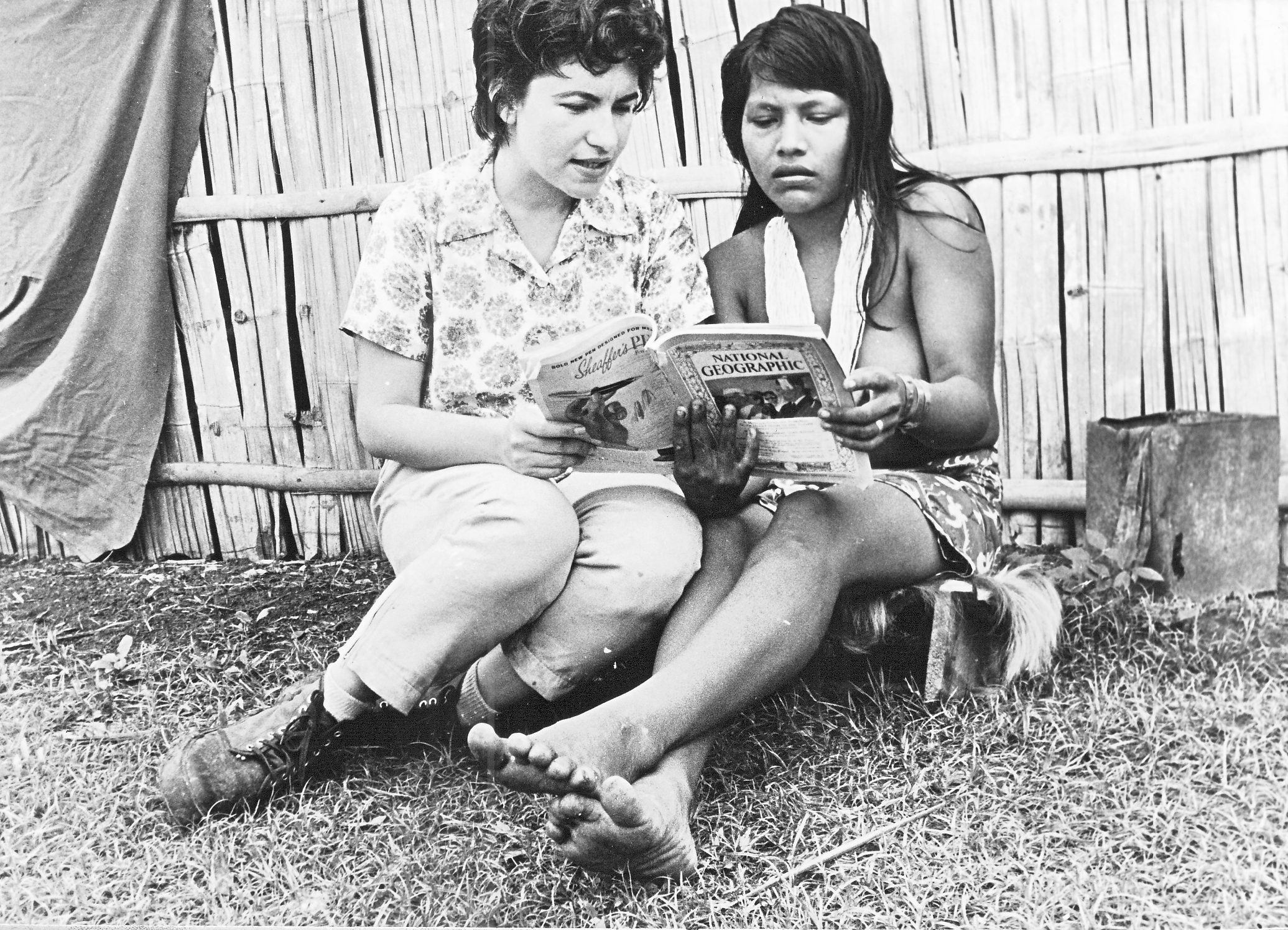
De Araúz during the Trans-Darien expedition

She met Professor Amado Arauz in 1958 while conducting research on the native peoples in the Darién Province. They were married on 30 December 1959, and had three children. Soon after their marriage, they departed via the first crossing by car from Panama to Bogotá called "Trans-Darien Expedition" in which they spent four months and twenty days in the Darien and Choco jungles.

== Final years ==
At the beginning of the 1980s, her eldest son Oscar died of cancer. Shortly after her son's death, de Araúz was diagnosed with breast cancer, a disease she battled with for the next two and a half years. She died in the morning of February 26, 1982, at the age of 49. During the final stage of her illness, De Araúz continued to work hard. Her last pieces of work were on the selection of parts of the Museum of Chitre and writing the pages of her new book "The New Edinburgh Darien"; she did not live to see her work completed.
