= List of songs recorded by Phyllis Hyman =

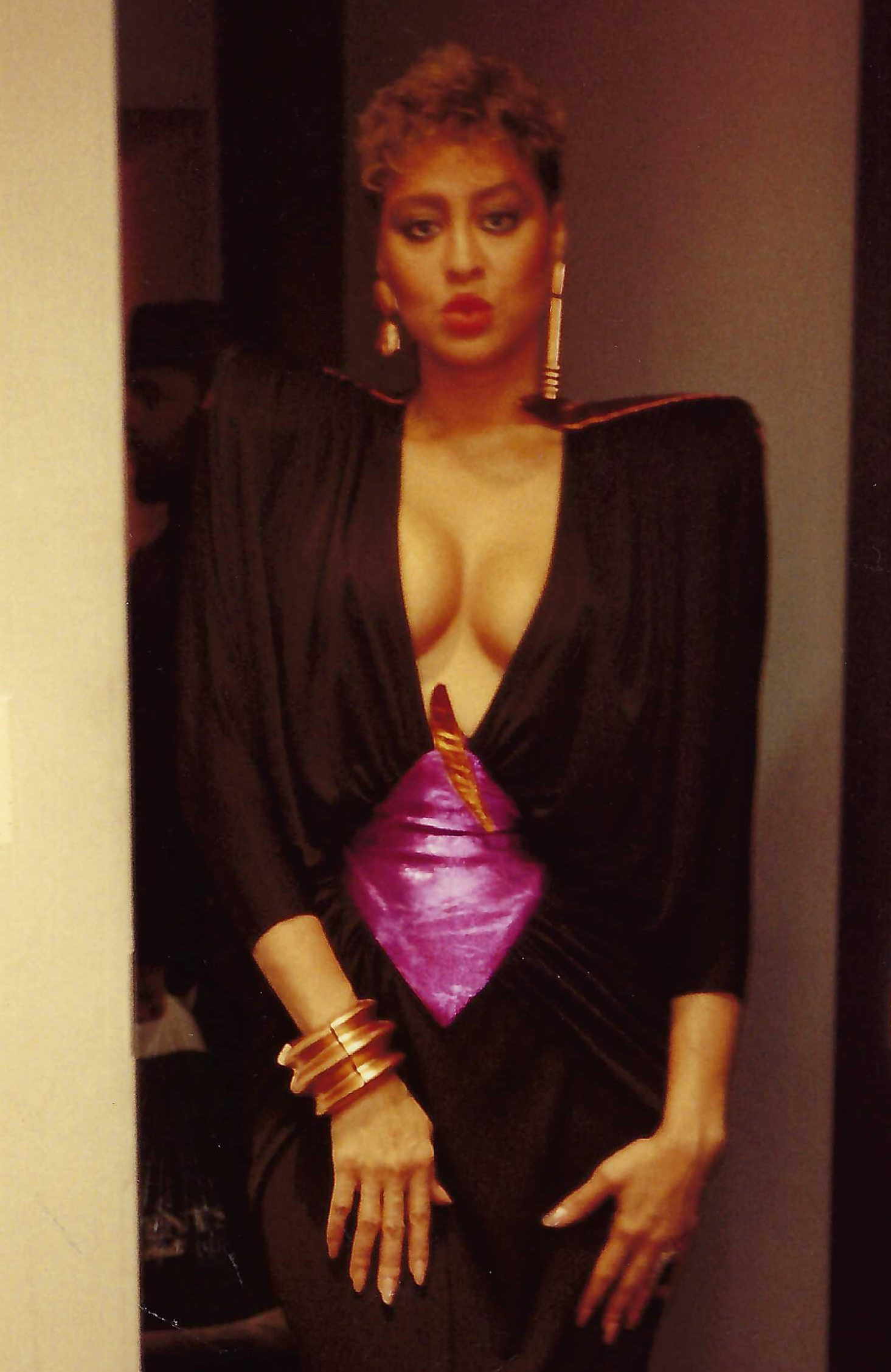
Phyllis Hyman backstage at The Blue Note Tokyo 1989.

This is an alphabetical list of songs recorded by Phyllis Hyman.

Hyman released her first single "Leavin' the Good Life Behind" in 1975 and her first album Phyllis Hyman in 1977. Before her death in 1995, she had released a total of eight studio albums from 1977 to 1991. Two further studio albums were released posthumously in 1995 and 1998, followed by numerous compilation albums containing both well-known and obscure material from her career.

Phyllis worked with a wide of range of R&B, Soul, Jazz and Blues performers, songwriters and producers throughout her career.

== List of songs ==
Key
†	Indicates single release

Name of song, writers, album and year of release
Song	Writer(s)	Original release	Year	Ref.
"Ain't You Had Enough Love" †	Carl McIntosh; Jane Eugene; Steve Nichol	Living All Alone	1986	
"And That Would Be"	Larry Alexander; Phyllis Hyman	Remembered	1998	
"As You Are" † (Pharoah Sanders featuring Phyllis Hyman)	Paul Smith; Norman Connors	Love Will Find a Way (Note: Later included on the compilations One on One (1998) and Old Friend: The Deluxe Collection 1976-1998 (2021).)	1978	
"Baby (I'm Gonna Love You)" †	Larry Alexander	Standalone single (Note: Later included on the compilations One on One (1998), Remembered (1998), Deliver the Love: The Anthology (2017) and Old Friend: The Deluxe Collection 1976-1998 (2021). It was also included on the 2015 expanded edition of Phyllis Hyman.)	1976	
"Back to Paradise"	James Jacobsen; Karen Manno; Jonathan Rosen	I Refuse to Be Lonely	1995	
"Be One"	Bill Le Sr.	School Daze (Note: Later included on the compilation In Between Heartaches: The Soul of a Diva (2003).)	1988	
"Be Careful (How You Treat My Love)"	Gary Glenn	Sing a Song; Somewhere in My Lifetime	1978	
"Beautiful Man of Mine"	Larry Alexander	Phyllis Hyman	1977	
"Betcha By Golly Wow" † (Norman Connors featuring Phyllis Hyman)	Thom Bell; Linda Creed	You Are My Starship (Note: Later included on the 2015 expanded edition of Phyllis Hyman. Also included on the compilations Under Her Spell: Greatest Hits (1989), The Legacy of Phyllis Hyman (1996), Loving You, Losing You: The Classic Balladry of Phyllis Hyman (1996), One on One (1998), Deliver the Love: The Anthology (2017) and Old Friend: The Deluxe Collection 1976-1998 (2021).)	1976	
"Black and Blue" † (Barry Manilow and Phyllis Hyman featuring Tom Scott)	Barry Manilow; Tom Kelly; Adrienne Anderson	Swing Street (Note: Later included on the compilations Deliver the Love: The Anthology (2017) and Old Friend: The Deluxe Collection 1976-1998 (2021).)	1987	
"But I Love You"	Reggie Lucas; James Mtume	You Know How to Love Me	1979	
"Can't Live Without You"	Timothy Wright	Remembered (Note: Later included on the compilation In Between Heartaches: The Soul of a Diva (2003).)	1998 (Note: Recorded in 1974.)	
"Can't We Fall in Love Again?" † (Duet with Michael Henderson)	John Lewis Parker; Peter Ivers	Can't We Fall in Love Again?	1981	
"Children of the World"	Hubert Eaves III	Phyllis Hyman	1977	
"Come Right or Not At All"	Jane Eugene; Nick Martinelli; Ian Prince; Phyllis Hyman; Angelo Morris	Forever with You	1998	
"Complete Me"	Brad Catron	You Know How to Love Me	1979	
"Deep Inside of You"	Rod Harris	Remembered	1998	
"Deliver the Love"	Onaje Allan Gumbs; Ausar Sahw Rachim	Phyllis Hyman	1977	
"Do Me"	Hiram Bullock; Larry Alexander	"Baby (I'm Gonna Love You)" (Note: Later included on the compilations One on One (1998), Remembered (1998) and Old Friend: The Deluxe Collection 1976-1998 (2021), and the 2015 expanded edition of Phyllis Hyman.)	1976	
"Do You Love Him"	Doug James; Betsy Durkin Matthes	In Between Heartaches: The Soul of a Diva	2003 (Note: Originally recorded in 1982 for use as a "love theme" in the American Soap Opera Search for Tomorrow but was ultimately not used.)	
"Don't Tell Me, Tell Her"	Doug James; Sandy Linzer	Can't We Fall in Love Again?	1981	
"Don't Wanna Change the World" †	Jonathan Rosen; Karen Manno; David Darlington	Prime of My Life	1991	
"Everything I Have is Good" (Pharoah Sanders featuring Norman Connors and Phyllis Hyman)	Pharoah Sanders	Love Will Find a Way (Note: Later included on the compilation In Between Heartaches: The Soul of a Diva (2003).)	1978	
"Falling Star"	Bill Neale; George Merrill; Shannon Rubicam	Goddess of Love	1983	
"First Time Together"	Cynthia Biggs; Kenneth Gamble; Thom Bell	Living All Alone	1986	
"Forever with You"	Kenneth Gamble; Terry Burruss	Forever with You	1998	
"Funny How Love Goes" †	Kenneth Gamble; Walter Sigler	Forever with You	1998	
"Give a Little More"	Howard Schneider; Larry Alexander; Phyllis Hyman	You Know How to Love Me	1979	
"Give Me One Good Reason to Stay"	Kenneth Gamble; Leon Huff	I Refuse to Be Lonely	1995	
"Goddess of Love"	Narada Michael Walden; Jeffrey Cohen; David Sancious	Goddess of Love	1983	
"Gonna Make Changes"	Phyllis Hyman	Sing a Song; Somewhere in My Lifetime	1978	
"Groove with You" † (The Isley Brothers cover)	Ernie Isley; Marvin Isley; O'Kelly Isley Jr. Ronald Isley; Rudolph Isley; Chris Jasper	Remembered	1998	
"Heavenly"	Reggie Lucas; James Mtume	You Know How to Love Me	1979	
"Here's That Rainy Day"	Jimmy Van Heusen; Johnny Burke	Sing a Song; Somewhere in My Lifetime	1978	
"Hold Me"		Remembered	1998	
"Hold On"	Hubert Eaves III; Tawatha Agee	You Know How to Love Me	1979	
"Hottest Love Around"	Doug James; Sue Shifrin	Prime of My Life (Japanese Edition) (Note: Also appeared as a b-side on the promotional CD for the single "I Found Love". Later included on the compilations In Between the Heartaches: The Soul of a Diva (2003), Deliver the Love: The Anthology (2017) and Old Friend: The Deluxe Collection 1976-1998 (2021).)	1991	
"How Long"	Michael O'Hara; Phyllis Hyman	Forever with You	1998	
"Hurry Up This Way Again"	Dexter Wansel; Cynthia Biggs	Forever with You	1998	
"I Ain't Asking"	Nickolas Ashford; Valerie Simpson	Can't We Fall in Love Again?	1981	
"I Can't Take It Anymore"	Nick Martinelli; Reginald Hines	Prime of My Life	1991	
"I Don't Want to Lose You"	Thom Bell; Linda Creed	Phyllis Hyman	1977	
"I Found Love" †	Jonathan Rosen; Karen Manno	Prime of My Life	1991	
"I Got It Bad and That Ain't Good / Mood Indigo" (with Terri Klausner)	Paul Francis Webster	Duke Ellington's Sophisticated Ladies (Note: Later included on the compilation One on One (1998).)	1982	
"I Refuse to Be Lonely" †	Jud Friedman; Alan Rich; Nick Martinelli; Phyllis Hyman	I Refuse to Be Lonely	1995	
"If You Ever Change Your Mind"	David Batteau; Richard Calhoun; Scott Shelley	In Between Heartaches: The Soul of a Diva (Note: Later included on the compilations Deliver the Love: The Anthology (2017) and Old Friend: The Deluxe Collection 1976-1998 (2021). Also included on the 2008 expanded edition of Can't We Fall in Love Again?)	2003 (Note: Recorded in 1980 for the album Can't We Fall in Love Again?.)	
"If You Want Me"	Junior Giscombe; Reggie Griffin	Living All Alone	1986	
"I'll Be Around" (McCoy Tyner featuring Phyllis Hyman)	McCoy Tyner; Stanley Clarke	Looking Out (Note: Later included on the compilations In Between Heartaches: The Soul of a Diva (2003), Deliver the Love: The Anthology (2017) and Old Friend: The Deluxe Collection 1976-1998 (2021).)	1982	
"I'm Calling You"	Phyllis Hyman; Kenneth Gamble; Dexter Wansel	I Refuse to Be Lonely	1995	
"I'm Checking Out Goombye"	Billy Strayhorn; Duke Ellington	Duke Ellington's Sophisticated Ladies	1982	
"I'm Not Asking You to Stay"	Joseph B. Jefferson; Richard William Roebuck	Can't We Fall in Love Again? (2008 Expanded Edition) (Note: Later included on the compilation Old Friend: The Deluxe Collection 1976-1998 (2021).)	2008	
"I'm Truly Yours" †	Kenneth Gamble; James Sigler	I Refuse to Be Lonely	1995	
"In a Sentimental Mood"	Irving Mills; Manny Kurtz; Duke Ellington	Duke Ellington's Sophisticated Ladies (Note: Later included on the compilations The Legacy of Phyllis Hyman (1996), Deliver the Love: The Anthology (2017) and Old Friend: The Deluxe Collection 1976-1998 (2021).)	1981	
"In Between Heartaches" (Dionne Warwick cover)	Burt Bacharach; Hal David	In Between Heartaches: The Soul of a Diva (Note: Later included on the 2008 expanded edition of Can't We Fall in Love Again?. Also included on the compilations Deliver the Love: The Anthology (2017) and Old Friend: The Deluxe Collection 1976-1998 (2021).)	2003 (Note: Recorded in 1980 for the album Can't We Fall in Love Again?.)	
"In Search of My Heart" (McCoy Tyner featuring Phyllis Hyman)	McCoy Tyner	Looking Out (Note: Later included on the compilations In Between Heartaches: The Soul of a Diva (2003), Deliver the Love: The Anthology (2017) and Old Friend: The Deluxe Collection 1976-1998 (2021).)	1982	
"It Don't Mean A Thing"	Duke Ellington; Irving Mills	Duke Ellington's Sophisticated Ladies	1981	
"It Takes Two"	Noel Cohen; Daryl Hair; Phyllis Hyman	I Refuse to Be Lonely	1995	
"It's Not About You (It's About Me)"	Dave Hall; Gordon Chambers; Phyllis Hyman	I Refuse to Be Lonely	1995	
"It's Time to Go"		Remembered	1998	
"Just 25 Miles to Anywhere"	Thom Bell; Joseph Jefferson	Goddess of Love	1983	
"Just Another Face in the Crowd"	Dennis Caldirola; Joe Ericksen	Can't We Fall in Love Again?	1981	
"Just Imagine..." (Norman Connors featuring Phyllis Hyman)	Onaje Allan Gumbs	You Are My Starship (Note: Later included on the compilations Deliver the Love: The Anthology (2017) and Old Friend: The Deluxe Collection 1976-1998 (2021).)	1976	
"Just Me and You"	Thom Bell; Joseph Jefferson	Goddess of Love	1983	
"Kiss You All Over" † (Exile cover)	Mike Chapman; Nicky Chinn	Somewhere in My Lifetime	1978	
"Leavin' the Good Life Behind" †	Alvin Darling	Standalone single (Note: Later included on the compilation One on One (1998).)	1975	
"Let Somebody Love You"	Alan Glass; Preston Glass	Goddess of Love	1983	
"Living All Alone" †	Cynthia Biggs; Dexter Wansel; Kenneth Gamble	Living All Alone	1986	
"Living in Confusion" †	Kenneth Gamble; Terry Burrus; Phyllis Hyman	Prime of My Life	1991	
"Living Inside Your Love" †	Skip Scarborough; Renee Taylor	Sing a Song; Somewhere in My Lifetime	1978	
"Lookin' for a Lovin'"	Phyllis Brown; Barry Goldberg	Somewhere in My Lifetime	1978	
"Loving You, Losing You" †	Thom Bell	Phyllis Hyman	1977	
"Love is Free"	Mark Radice	Sing a Song	1978	
"Love is Here" (Pharoah Sanders featuring Phyllis Hyman)	Pharoah Sanders	Love Will Find a Way (Note: Later included on the compilation One on One (1998).)	1978	
"Love Surrounds Us Everywhere" (McCoy Tyner featuring Phyllis Hyman)	McCoy Tyner	Looking Out (Note: Later included on the compilations In Between Heartaches: The Soul of a Diva (2003), Deliver the Love: The Anthology (2017) and Old Friend: The Deluxe Collection 1976-1998 (2021).)	1982	
"Magic Mona"	Thom Bell; Casey James; Leroy Bell; Jack Robinson	The Fish that Saved Pittsburgh (Note: Later included on the compilations In Between Heartaches: The Soul of a Diva (2003), Deliver the Love: The Anthology (2017) and Old Friend: The Deluxe Collection 1976-1998 (2021).)	1979	
"Maybe Tomorrow" (Four Tops featuring Phyllis Hyman)	Roxanne Seeman; Eddie del Barrio	Magic (Note: Later included on the compilation One on One (1998).)	1985	
"Meet Me on the Moon"	Gene McDaniels; Carrie Thompson	Prime of My Life	1991	
"Never Say Never Again"	Stephen Forsyth; Jim Ryan	One More Night	2008	
"No One But You"	Kenneth Gamble; Leon A. Huff	Forever with You	1998	
"No One Can Love You More" †	Skip Scarborough	Phyllis Hyman	1977	
"Obsession" † (Lonnie Liston Smith featuring Phyllis Hyman)	Phyllis Hyman; Terry Burrus	Love Goddess (Note: Later included on the compilation One on One (1998).)	1990	
"Old Friend" †	Thom Bell; Linda Creed	Living All Alone	1986	
"One Thing On My Mind"	Evie Sands; Richard Germinaro	Phyllis Hyman	1977	
"Prime of My Life"	Preston Glass; Alan Glass	Prime of My Life	1991	
"Remember Who You Are" (Norman Connors featuring Phyllis Hyman)	Lynn DeFino; Roxanna Ward	Remember Who You Are (Note: Later included on the compilation One on One (1998).)	1993	
"Riding the Tiger" †	Narada Michael Walden; Jeffrey Cohen; Dwayne Simmons	Goddess of Love	1983	
"Run Jesse Run" † (with Lou Rawls and James Cleveland)	Kenneth Gamble; Leon Huff	Standalone single (Note: Later included on the compilation Phylladelphia - The Gamble-Huff Years (1999), as well as a 2-CD set of Living All Alone and Prime of My Life released in 2005.)	1988	
"Sacred Kind of Love" † (Grover Washington, Jr. featuring Phyllis Hyman)	Sami McKinney; Karl C. Porter; Karin Rybar	Time Out of Mind (Note: Later included on the compilations In Between Heartaches: The Soul of a Diva (2003), Deliver the Love: The Anthology (2017) and Old Friend: The Deluxe Collection 1976-1998 (2021).)	1989	
"Screamin' at the Moon" †	Ron Hollins; Wayne Wallace	Living All Alone	1986	
"Set a Little Trap"	James Sigler	Forever with You	1998	
"Sing a Song"	Philip Bailey; Ernest Straughter	Sing a Song	1978	
"Sleep on It" (Chaka Khan cover)	Larry McNally; Andrew Kastner	Soul Togetherness 2002 (Note: Later included on the compilations In Between Heartaches: The Soul of a Diva (2003), Deliver the Love: The Anthology (2017) and Old Friend: The Deluxe Collection 1976–1998 (2021). Also included on the 2008 expanded edition of Can't We Fall in Love Again?.)	2002 (Note: Recorded in 1980 for the album Can't We Fall in Love Again?.)	
"Slow Dancin'"	LeRoy Bell; Casey James; Thom Bell	Living All Alone	1986	
"So Strange" †	Theodore Life; Billy Green	Somewhere in My Lifetime	1978	
"Some Way"	Reggie Lucas; James Mtume	You Know How to Love Me	1979	
"Someone to Love"	Michael Masser	Forever with You	1998	
"Somewhere in My Lifetime" †	Jesus Alvarez	Somewhere in My Lifetime	1978	
"Soon Come Again"	Larry Alexander; Sandy Torano	Sing a Song; Somewhere in My Lifetime	1978	
"Sounds Like a Love Song" (Bobby Glenn cover)	Douglas Gibbs; Ralph Johnson	Loving You, Losing You: The Classic Balladry Of Phyllis Hyman	1996	
"Souvenirs"	Preston Glass; Alan Glass; Narada Michael Walden; Walter Afanasieff	Forever with You	1998	
"Spring's Arrival" (Jon Lucien featuring Phyllis Hyman)	Jon Lucien	Premonition (Note: Later included on the compilation In Between Heartaches: The Soul of a Diva (2003).)	1976	
"Sweet Music"	Al Martinez	Sing a Song	1978	
"Take the "A" Train" (with Gregory Hines)	Billy Strayhorn	Duke Ellington's Sophisticated Ladies (Note: Later included on the compilation One on One (1998).)	1981	
"Tell Me What You're Gonna Do"	Barry Eastmond; Phyllis Hyman; Herb Middleton	Forever with You	1998	
"The Answer is You"	Mark Radice	Sing a Song; Somewhere in My Lifetime	1978	
"The Kids"	Kenneth Gamble; Bruce A. Hawes	Forever with You	1998	
"The Love Too Good to Last"	Burt Bacharach; Carole Bayer Sager; Peter Allen	Can't We Fall in Love Again?	1981	
"The Night Bird Gets the Love"	Muhyi Shakoor; Clifford Carter	Phyllis Hyman	1977	
"The Strength of a Woman"	Phyllis Hyman; Denise Rich; Sunny Hilden	Forever with You	1998	
"The Sunshine in My Life"	Larry Alexander; Phyllis Hyman	Can't We Fall in Love Again?	1981	
"The Survivor" † (Joe Sample featuring Phyllis Hyman)	Joe Sample; Will Jennings	Oasis (Note: Later included on the compilation One on One (1998).)	1985	
"This Feeling Must Be Love"	Reggie Lucas; James Mtume	You Know How to Love Me	1979	
"This Too Shall Pass"	Lorrain Feather; Joe Curiale	I Refuse to Be Lonely	1995	
"Tonight You and Me" †	Bruce Hawes; Peyton Scott	Can't We Fall in Love Again?	1981	
"Under Your Spell" †	Reggie Lucas; James Mtume	You Know How to Love Me	1979	
"Waiting for the Last Tear to Fall"	Jon Rosen; Karen Manno; Jeff Franzel	I Refuse to Be Lonely	1995	
"Walk Away"	Marti Sharron; Kenny Hirsch	Prime of My Life	1991	
"Was Yesterday Such a Long Time Ago"	M. Scott; Buddy Scott	Phyllis Hyman	1977	
"We Both Need Each Other" † (Norman Connors featuring Phyllis Hyman)	Michael Henderson	You Are My Starship (Note: Later included on the compilations The Legacy of Phyllis Hyman (1996), Deliver the Love: The Anthology (2017) and Old Friend: The Deluxe Collection 1976–1998 (2021). Also appeared as a bonus track on the 1996 CD issue of Sing a Song.)	1976	
"We Should Be Lovers"	Joseph Jefferson; Charles Simmons; Sherman Marshall	Goddess of Love	1983	
"What You Won't Do for Love" (Bobby Caldwell cover)	Alfons Kettner; Bobby Caldwell	Living All Alone	1986	
"Whatever Happened to Our Love"	Kenneth Gamble; Terry Burrus	Prime of My Life	1991	
"When I Give My Love (This Time)"	Kenneth Gamble; Roland Chambers	Prime of My Life	1991	
"When You Get Right Down to It" †	Nick Martinelli; Reginald Hines	Prime of My Life	1991	
"Why Did You Turn Me On" †	Narada Michael Walden; Corrado Rustici; Allee Willis	Goddess of Love	1983	
"Why Not Me"	Barry J. Eastmond; Gordon Chambers; Diane Quander; Phyllis Hyman	I Refuse to Be Lonely	1995	
"You Just Don't Know" †	Cynthia Biggs; Kenneth Gamble; Thom Bell	Living All Alone	1986	
"You Know How to Love Me" †	Reggie Lucas; James Mtume	You Know How to Love Me	1979	
"You Sure Look Good to Me" †	Brian Potter; Rick Conedera	Can't We Fall in Love Again?	1981	
"Your Move, My Heart"	George Merrill; Shannon Rubicam	Goddess of Love	1983	
"You're the One"	John Davis	You Know How to Love Me (2002 reissue) (Note: Later included on the 2008 expanded edition of Can't We Fall in Love Again? and 2015 expanded edition of You Know How to Love Me. Also included on the compilations The Buddah Years (2013) and Old Friend: The Deluxe Collection 1976–1998 (2021).)	2002	

== See also ==
- Phyllis Hyman discography
