= Phyllis Hyman discography =

This discography documents albums and singles released by American R&B/soul singer Phyllis Hyman.

== Albums ==
=== Studio albums ===
List of studio albums with chart positions
Title	Details	Peak chart positions		
Title	Details	US	US R&B	UK
Phyllis Hyman	Label: Buddah Records (BDS 5681); Released: April 1977	107	49	—
Sing a Song	Label: Buddah Records (BDS 5711); Released: 1978; Not released in the United States	—	—	—
Somewhere in My Lifetime	Label: Arista Records (AB 4202); Released: January 10, 1979	70	15	—
You Know How to Love Me	Label: Arista Records (AL 9509); Released: October 23, 1979	50	10	—
Can't We Fall in Love Again?	Label: Arista Records (AL 9544); Released: June 12, 1981	57	11	—
Goddess of Love	Label: Arista Records (AL 9619); Released: May 9, 1983	112	20	—
Living All Alone	Label: Philadelphia International Records (ST-53029); Released: August 15, 1986	78	11	97
Prime of My Life	Label: Philadelphia International Records (72445-11006-2); Released: June 11, 1991	117	10	—
I Refuse to Be Lonely	Label: Philadelphia International Records (72445-11040-2); Released: November 21, 1995	67	12	—
Forever with You	Label: Philadelphia International Records (53878-30902-9); Released: July 28, 1998	—	66	—
"—" denotes the album failed to chart

=== Compilation albums ===
Year	Title	Peaks	Record label
Year	Title	US R&B	Record label
1986	The Best of Phyllis Hyman	—	Arista
1987	The Sophisticated Lady	—	Arista
1989	Under Her Spell: Phyllis Hyman's Greatest Hits	—	Arista
1990	The Best of Phyllis Hyman: The Buddah Years	—	Sequel
1994	Greatest Hits	—	Kama Sutra
1996	Loving You, Losing You: The Classic Balladry of Phyllis Hyman	47	RCA
1996	The Legacy of Phyllis Hyman	78	Arista
1998	One on One	—	Hip-O
1998	Remembered	—	Roadshow
1998	Sweet Music	—	Camden
1999	Master Hits: Phyllis Hyman	—	Arista
1999	Phylladelphia: The Gamble-Huff Years	—	Westside
2000	It's About Me	—	Westside
2003	In Between the Heartaches: The Soul of a Diva	—	Expansion
2004	Ultimate Phyllis Hyman	—	Arista
2004	Platinum & Gold Collection	—	Arista
2006	Love Songs	—	Arista
2021	Old Friend: The Deluxe Collection 1976-1998	—	SoulMusic
"—" denotes the album failed to chart

== Singles ==
Year	Title	Peak chart positions			Album
Year	Title	US R&B	US Dance	UK	Album
1975	"Leavin' the Good Life Behind"	—	9	—	—N/a
1976	"We Both Need Each Other" (with Norman Connors & Michael Henderson)	23	—	—	You Are My Starship
1976	"Baby (I'm Gonna Love You)"	76	—	—	—N/a
1977	"Betcha by Golly Wow" (with Norman Connors)	29	—	—	You Are My Starship
1977	"Loving You - Losing You"	32	36	—	Phyllis Hyman
1977	"No One Can Love You More"	58	—	—	Phyllis Hyman
1978	"Living Inside Your Love"	—	—	—	Sing a Song
1978	"Somewhere in My Lifetime"	12	—	—	Somewhere in My Lifetime
1979	"So Strange"	—	75	—	Somewhere in My Lifetime
1979	"Kiss You All Over"	—	75	—	Somewhere in My Lifetime
1979	"You Know How to Love Me"	12	6	47	You Know How to Love Me
1980	"Under Your Spell"	37	—	—	You Know How to Love Me
1980	"Loving You - Losing You" (U.K. re-release)	—	—	—	Buddah All-Stars
1981	"Can't We Fall in Love Again" (with Michael Henderson)	9	—	—	Can't We Fall in Love Again
1981	"Tonight You and Me"	22	30	—	Can't We Fall in Love Again
1982	"You Sure Look Good to Me"	76	—	56	Can't We Fall in Love Again
1983	"Riding the Tiger"	30	20	—	Goddess of Love
1983	"Why Did You Turn Me On"	74	—	—	Goddess of Love
1986	"Old Friend"	14	—	—	Living All Alone
1986	"You Know How to Love Me" (U.K. re-release)	—	—	89	The Best of Phyllis Hyman
1986	"Living All Alone"	12	—	—	Living All Alone
1987	"Screaming at the Moon"	—	—	83	Living All Alone
1987	"Ain't You Had Enough Love"	29	—	—	Living All Alone
1987	"You Just Don't Know"	—	—	—	Living All Alone
1988	"Run Jesse Run" (Lou Rawls, Rev. James Cleveland, Phyllis Hyman, The James Cleveland Choir and Leon A. Huff)	—	—	—	—N/a
1990	"Sacred Kind of Love" (with Grover Washington, Jr.)	21	—	—	Time Out of Mind
1990	"Obsession" (with Lonnie Liston Smith)	79	—	—	Love Goddess
1991	"Don't Wanna Change the World"	1	—	—	Prime of My Life
1991	"Living in Confusion"	9	—	—	Prime of My Life
1992	"When You Get Right Down to It"	10	—	—	Prime of My Life
1992	"I Found Love"	70	—	—	Prime of My Life
1993	"Remember Who You Are" (with Norman Connors)	86	—	—	Remember Who You Are
1995	"I Refuse to Be Lonely"	59	—	—	I Refuse to Be Lonely
1996	"I'm Truly Yours"	94	—	—	I Refuse to Be Lonely
1998	"Funny How Love Goes" (with Damon Williams)	75	—	—	Forever with You
1998	"Tell Me What You're Gonna Do"	78	—	—	Forever with You
1998	"Groove with You"	—	—	—	Remembered
"—" denotes the single failed to chart

== See also ==
- List of songs recorded by Phyllis Hyman
