= Old Friend: The Deluxe Collection 1976–1998 =

Box set by Phyllis Hyman
- Released: August 6, 2021
- Recorded: 1976–1995
- Genres: Soul; R&B; adult contemporary; disco; quiet storm; jazz
- Label: SoulMusic Records
- Producers: Larry Alexander; John Davis; Jerry Peters; Sandy Torano; Skip Scarborough; Barry Manilow; Ron Dante; Theodore Life; James Mtume; Reggie Lucas; Norman Connors; Chuck Jackson; Maxine Brown; Thom Bell; Narada Michael Walden; Kenny Gamble; Reggie Griffin; Leon Huff; Nick Martinelli; Dexter Wansel; Terry Burruss; Roland Chambers; Marti Sharron; Gene McDanields

Professional ratings
Review scores
Source	Rating
AllMusic	4.5/5 stars

Old Friend: The Deluxe Collection 1976–1998 is a posthumous compilation album by singer Phyllis Hyman, released in 2021. The box set contains 9 CDs, featuring all of her studio albums as well as bonus material recorded over the course of her career.

== Reception ==
In a review for AllMusic, Andy Kellman described the box set as a "proper testament to Hyman's excellence" and noted the "obvious love and care" that went into its assembly. The box set was given 4 1/2 stars out of 5.

AllMusic also named the box set as one of its favourite archival releases of 2021.

== Track listing ==
Asterisks (*) denote bonus tracks. Tracklist taken from SoulMusic press release .

Disc 1 – Phyllis Hyman (1977) with 6 bonus tracks
No.	Title	Writer(s)	Length
1.	"Loving You – Losing You"	Thom Bell; LeRoy Bell	7:27
2.	"No One Can Love You More"	Skip Scarborough	4:23
3.	"One Thing on My Mind"	Evie Sands; Richard Germinaro	5:30
4.	"I Don't Want to Lose You"	Thom Bell; Linda Creed	5:31
5.	"Deliver the Love"	Onaje Allan Gumbs; Ausar Sahw Rachim	3:59
6.	"Was Yesterday Such a Long Time Ago"	M. Goode; Buddy Scott	4:36
7.	"Night Bird Gets the Love"	Muhyi Shakoor; Clifford Carter	5:21
8.	"Beautiful Man of Mine"	Larry Alexander	6:58
9.	"Children of the World"	Hubert Eaves III	3:01
10.	"Baby (I'm Gonna Love You)"	Larry Alexander	3:51
11.	"Do Me" (7" version)	Hiram Bullock; Larry Alexander	3:01
12.	"You're the One"	John E. Davis	5:24
13.	"We Need Each Other" (Norman Connors featuring Phyllis Hyman and Michael Henderson)	Michael Henderson	4:01
14.	"Betcha By Golly Wow" (Norman Connors featuring Phyllis Hyman)	Thom Bell; Linda Creed	6:19
15.	"Just Imagine" (Norman Connors featuring Phyllis Hyman)	Onaje Allan Gumbs	3:58
Total length:			1:13:28

- Tracks 1–9 from the album Phyllis Hyman (1977).
- Track 10 was a standalone single from 1976.
- Track 11 was the b-side of "Baby (I'm Gonna Love You)" (1976).
- Track 12 was previously released on the 2002 CD re-issue of You Know How to Love Me (1978) and the 2008 CD re-issue of Can't We Fall in Love Again? (1981).
- Tracks 13–15 from the Norman Connors album You Are My Starship (1976).

Disc 2 – Somewhere in My Lifetime (1979) with 6 bonus tracks
No.	Title	Writer(s)	Length
1.	"Kiss You All Over"	Mike Chapman; Nicky Chinn	5:07
2.	"Somewhere in My Lifetime"	Jesus Alvarez	3:29
3.	"Lookin' for a Lovin'"	Phyllis Brown; Barry Goldberg	2:56
4.	"The Answer Is You"	Mark Radice	5:09
5.	"So Strange"	Theodore Life; Billy Green	4:41
6.	"Gonna Make Changes"	Phyllis Hyman	3:58
7.	"Living Inside Your Love"	Skip Scarborough; Renee Taylor	6:13
8.	"Be Careful (How You Treat My Love)"	Garry Glenn	4:13
9.	"Soon Come Again"	Larry Alexander; Sandy Torano	3:34
10.	"Here's That Rainy Day"	Jimmy Van Heusen; Johnny Burke	3:10
11.	"So Strange" (12" version)	Theodore Life; Billy Green	9:01
12.	"Kiss You All Over" (12" version)	Mike Chapman; Nicky Chinn	6:16
13.	"Sweet Music"	Al Martinez	3:48
14.	"Love is Free"	Mark Radice	3:45
15.	"Sing a Song"	Philip Bailey; Ernest Straughter	3:37
16.	"As You Are" (Pharoah Sanders featuring Phyllis Hyman)	Norman Connors; Paul Smith	5:09
Total length:			1:14:09

- Tracks 1–10 from the album Somewhere in My Lifetime (1979).
- Tracks 4, 6–10 were originally released on the 1978 album Sing a Song.
- Track 11 was the a-side of the U.S. 12" promo Arista SP-42.
- Track 12 was the b-side of the U.S. 12" promo Arista SP-42 and the U.K. "Under Your Spell" 12" single (ARIST 12343).
- Tracks 13–15 released on Sing a Song (1978) but did not appear on Somewhere in My Lifetime.
- Track 16 from the Pharoah Sanders album Love Will Find a Way (1978).

Disc 3 – You Know How to Love Me (1979) with 7 bonus tracks
No.	Title	Writer(s)	Length
1.	"You Know How to Love Me"	Reggie Lucas; James Mtume	7:35
2.	"Some Way"	Reggie Lucas; James Mtume	5:11
3.	"Under Your Spell"	Reggie Lucas; James Mtume	4:37
4.	"This Feeling Must Be Love"	William Beard	3:45
5.	"But I Love You"	Misha Segal; Morgan Ames	3:05
6.	"Heavenly"	Reggie Lucas; James Mtume	4:31
7.	"Hold On"	Hubert Eaves III; Tawatha Agee	4:14
8.	"Give a Little More"	Howard Schneider; Larry Alexander; Phyllis Hyman	4:05
9.	"Complete Me"	Brad Catron	5:26
10.	"You Know How to Love Me" (Single Edit)	Reggie Lucas; James Mtume	3:47
11.	"Under Your Spell" (Single Edit)	Reggie Lucas; James Mtume	3:37
12.	"Magic Mona"	Thom Bell; Leroy Bell; Casey James; Jack Robinson	3:24
13.	"I'll Be Around" (McCoy Tyner featuring Phyllis Hyman)	Stanley Clarke; McCoy Tyner	6:12
14.	"Love Surrounds Us Everywhere" (McCoy Tyner featuring Phyllis Hyman)	McCoy Tyner	5:14
15.	"In Search of My Heart" (McCoy Tyner featuring Phyllis Hyman)	McCoy Tyner	7:06
16.	"In a Sentimental Mood"	Irving Mills; Manny Kurtz	3:25
Total length:			1:15:22

- Tracks 1–9 from the album You Know How to Love Me (1979).
- Track 12 from the Motion Picture soundtrack The Fish That Saved Pittsburgh (1979).
- Tracks 13–15 from the McCoy Tyner album Looking Out (1982).
- Track 16 from the 1981 soundtrack for Duke Ellington's Sophisticated Ladies.

Disc 4 – Can't We Fall in Love Again? (1981) with 6 bonus tracks
No.	Title	Writer(s)	Length
1.	"You Sure Look Good to Me"	Brian Potter; Rick Conedera	4:19
2.	"Don't Tell Me, Tell Her"	Doug James; Sandy Linzer	4:19
3.	"I Ain't Asking"	Nickolas Ashford; Valerie Simpson	4:02
4.	"Can't We Fall in Love Again?" (Duet with Michael Henderson)	John Lewis Parker; Peter Ivers	5:16
5.	"The Love Too Good To Last"	Burt Bacharach; Carole Bayer Sager; Peter Allen	4:05
6.	"Tonight You and Me"	Bruce Hawes; Peyton Scott	3:46
7.	"Sunshine in My Life"	Larry Alexander; Phyllis Hyman	4:26
8.	"Just Another Face in the Crowd"	Dennis Caldirola; Joe Ericksen	5:51
9.	"Can't We Fall in Love Again?" (Single version)	John Lewis Parker; Peter Ivers	4:39
10.	"You Sure Look Good to Me" (Single version)	Brian Potter; Rick Conedera	3:28
11.	"Tonight You and Me" (Disco version)	Bruce Hawes; Peyton Scott	5:25
12.	"Sleep on It"	Andrew Kastner; Larry McNally	3:21
13.	"If You Ever Change Your Mind"	David Batteau; Richard Calhoun; Scott Shelley	2:58
14.	"In Between the Heartaches"	Burt Bacharach; Hal David	3:44
Total length:			59:46

- Tracks 1–8 from the album Can't We Fall in Love Again? (1981).
- Track 11 from the U.S. 12-inch promo Arista SP 114 and U.K. 12-inch single Arista ARIST 12 444.
- Tracks 12–14 previously released on the compilation album In Between the Heartaches (2003) and the 2008 CD re-issue of Can't We Fall in Love Again?.

Disc 5 – Goddess of Love with 3 bonus tracks
No.	Title	Writer(s)	Length
1.	"Riding the Tiger"	Narada Michael Walden; Jeffrey Cohen; Dwayne Simmons	6:22
2.	"Goddess of Love"	Narada Michael Walden; Jeffrey Cohen; David Sancious	5:50
3.	"Why Did You Turn Me On"	Narada Michael Walden; Corrado Rustici; Allee Willis	4:11
4.	"Your Move, My Heart"	George Merrill; Shannon Rubicam	4:43
5.	"Let Somebody Love You"	Alan Glass; Preston Glass	4:44
6.	"Falling Star"	Bill Neale; George Merrill; Shannon Rubicam	3:46
7.	"We Should Be Lovers"	Joseph Jefferson; Charles Simmons; Sherman Marshall	3:53
8.	"Just Me and You"	Thom Bell; Joseph Jefferson	4:36
9.	"Just 25 Miles to Anywhere"	Thom Bell; Joseph Jefferson	2:46
10.	"I'm Not Asking You to Stay"	Joseph Jefferson; Richard Roebuck	4:20
11.	"Riding the Tiger" (Dance version)	Narada Michael Walden; Jeffrey Cohen; Dwayne Simmons	8:46
12.	"Riding the Tiger" (Single edit)	Narada Michael Walden; Jeffrey Cohen; Dwayne Simmons	4:08
Total length:			58:10

- Tracks 1–9 from the album Goddess of Love (1983).
- Track 10 previously released on the 2008 CD re-issue of Can't We Fall in Love Again? (1981).
- Track 11 originally released on 12-inch single Arista AD 1-9041 (1983).

Disc 6 – Living All Alone with 2 bonus tracks
No.	Title	Writer(s)	Length
1.	"Living All Alone"	Cynthia Biggs; Kenneth Gamble; Dexter Wansel	5:08
2.	"First Time Together"	Cynthia Biggs; Kenneth Gamble; Thom Bell	4:03
3.	"If You Want Me"	Reggie Griffin; Junior Giscombe	4:20
4.	"Slow Dancin'"	Thom Bell; LeRoy Bell; Casey James	4:35
5.	"Old Friend"	Linda Creed	4:52
6.	"You Just Don't Know"	Cynthia Biggs; Kenneth Gamble; Thom Bell	4:15
7.	"Ain't You Had Enough Love?"	Carl McIntosh; Jane Eugene; Steve Nichol	4:13
8.	"Screaming at the Moon"	Wayne Wallace; Ronald Hollins	4:09
9.	"What You Won't Do For Love"	Bobby Caldwell; Alfons Kettner	4:05
10.	"Black and Blue" (Barry Manilow and Phyllis Hyman featuring Tom Scott)	Barry Manilow; Tom Kelly; Adrienne Anderson	4:02
11.	"Sacred Kind of Love" (Grover Washington, Jr. featuring Phyllis Hyman)	Sami McKinney; KC Porter; Karin Rybar	5:37
Total length:			49:25

- Tracks 1–9 from the album Living All Alone (1986).
- Track 10 from the Barry Manilow album Swing Street (1987).
- Track 11 from the Grover Washington, Jr. album Time Out of Mind (1989).

Disc 7 – Prime of My Life (1991) with 2 bonus tracks
No.	Title	Writer(s)	Length
1.	"When You Get Right Down To It"	Nick Martinelli; Reginald Hines	4:22
2.	"I Found Love"	Jonathan Rosen; Karen Manno	4:26
3.	"Don’t Wanna Change The World"	Jonathan Rosen; Karen Manno; David Darlington	5:23
4.	"Prime of My Life"	Preston Glass; Alan Glass	5:12
5.	"When I Give My Love (This Time)"	Kenneth Gamble; Roland Chambers	7:02
6.	"I Can't Take It Anymore"	Nick Martinelli; Reginald Hines	4:22
7.	"Walk Away"	Marti Sharron; Kenny Hirsch	4:24
8.	"Living in Confusion"	Kenneth Gamble; Terry Burrus; Phyllis Hyman	7:07
9.	"Meet Me on the Moon"	Gene McDaniels; Carrie Thompson	6:45
10.	"Whatever Happened To Our Love"	Kenneth Gamble; Terry Burrus	4:09
11.	"(The) Hottest Love Around"	Doug James; Sue Shifrin	4:29
12.	"Don't Wanna Change the World" (No Rap version)	Jonathan Rosen; Karen Manno; David Darlington	4:09
Total length:			1:01:56

- Tracks 1–10 from the album Prime of My Life (1991).
- Track 11 was a bonus track for Prime of My Life in Japan and also appeared on the promo CD for "I Found Love" (Zoo Entertainment ZP17068-2).
- Track 12 was the b-side of the cassette single Zoo Entertainment 14005-4.

Disc 8 – I Refuse to Be Lonely (1995)
No.	Title	Writer(s)	Length
1.	"I Refuse To Be Lonely"	Jud Friedman; Alan Rich; Nick Martinelli; Phyllis Hyman	4:00
2.	"Waiting for the Last Tear To Fall"	Jon Rosen; Karen Manno; Jeff Franzel	4:11
3.	"This Too Shall Pass"	Lorrain Feather; Joe Curiale	5:28
4.	"I'm Truly Yours"	Kenneth Gamble; James Sigler	5:41
5.	"I'm Calling You"	Phyllis Hyman; Kenneth Gamble; Dexter Wansel	6:01
6.	"Back to Paradise"	Jon Rosen; Karen Manno; Jim Jacobsen	4:50
7.	"It's Not About You (It's About Me)"	Dave Hall; Gordon Chambers; Phyllis Hyman	5:16
8.	"It Takes Two"	Noel Cohen; Daryl Hair; Phyllis Hyman	4:13
9.	"Why Not Me"	Barry J. Eastmond; Gordon Chambers; Diane Quander; Phyllis Hyman	4:41
10.	"Give Me One Good Reason To Stay"	Kenneth Gamble; Leon A. Huff	5:13
Total length:			1:01:56

Disc 9 – Forever with You (1998)
No.	Title	Writer(s)	Length
1.	"Forever With You"	Kenneth Gamble; Terry Burruss	4:21
2.	"Funny How Love Goes" (Introducing Damon)	Kenneth Gamble; Walter Sigler	4:49
3.	"Come Right Or Not at All"	Jane Eugene; Nick Martinelli; Ian Prince; Phyllis Hyman; Angelo Morris	5:21
4.	"The Strength of a Woman"	Phyllis Hyman; Denise Rich; Sunny Hilden	4:25
5.	"Hurry Up This Way Again"	Dexter Wansel; Cynthia Biggs	4:23
6.	"How Long"	Michael O'Hara; Phyllis Hyman	4:19
7.	"Someone To Love"	Michael Masser	4:04
8.	"Tell Me What You're Gonna Do"	Barry Eastmond; Phyllis Hyman; Herb Middleton	4:39
9.	"The Kids"	Kenneth Gamble; Bruce A. Hawes	4:41
10.	"Set A Little Trap"	James Sigler	4:21
11.	"No One But You"	Kenneth Gamble; Leon A. Huff	4:34
12.	"Souvenirs"	Preston Glass; Alan Glass; Narada Michael Walden; Walter Afanasieff	4:28
Total length:			54:35

== Charts ==
Chart (2021)	Peak position
UK Independent Album Breakers Chart (OCC)	15
