= List of quiet storm songs =

This is a list of songs associated with the quiet storm radio format, widely heard in the United States starting in 1976 as a form of early evening/late night easy listening music aimed at a sophisticated African American audience. Quiet storm radio programs thrived in the 1980s, with many stations across the US carrying a quiet storm program at night, and a few stations broadcasting in the format all day long. The field adapted in the 1990s as new listeners embraced neo-soul experimentation, hip hop samples and beats, as well as more explicit sexual themes. Slow jams with quiet storm elements continued to be produced through the 2000s and 2010s.

Quiet storm songs are a mix of genres, including pop, contemporary R&B, smooth soul, smooth jazz and jazz fusion – songs having an easy-flowing and romantic character. The format first appeared in 1976 but initially it drew from songs recorded earlier. After the radio format became popular, songs were written to fit the format, and in that manner the radio style became a broad "super-genre" of music.

== Songs ==
Year	Artist	Song	Album	Notes
1971	The Temptations	"Just My Imagination (Running Away with Me)"	Sky's the Limit	
1971	Al Green	"Let's Stay Together"	Let's Stay Together	
1971	Jerry Butler	"Ain't Understanding Mellow"	The Sagittarius Movement	(duet with Brenda Lee Eager)
1972	Luther Ingram	"(If Loving You Is Wrong) I Don't Want to Be Right"	independent single	
1972	Billy Paul	"Me and Mrs. Jones"	360 Degrees of Billy Paul	
1973	Barry White	"I've Got So Much to Give"	I've Got So Much to Give	
1973	The Moments	"Sexy Mama"	independent single	
1973	Bloodstone	"Natural High"	Natural High	
1973	Roberta Flack	"Killing Me Softly with His Song"	Killing Me Softly	
1973	Marvin Gaye	"Let's Get It On"	Let's Get It On	
1973	Marvin Gaye	"Distant Lover"	Let's Get It On	
1973	Marvin Gaye	"Come Get to This"	Let's Get It On	
1974	Tower of Power	"Time Will Tell"	Back to Oakland	
1974	Barry White	"Can't Get Enough of Your Love, Babe"	Can't Get Enough	
1974	Roberta Flack	"Feel Like Makin' Love"	Feel Like Makin' Love	
1974	The Stylistics	"You Make Me Feel Brand New"	Rockin' Roll Baby	
1975	The Blackbyrds	"Walking in Rhythm"	Flying Start	
1975	Harold Melvin & the Blue Notes	"Hope That We Can Be Together Soon"	To Be True	
1975	Dorothy Moore	"Misty Blue"	Misty Blue	
1975	Natalie Cole	"I Can't Say No"	Inseparable	
1975	Natalie Cole	"Inseparable"	Inseparable	
1975	The Isley Brothers	"For the Love of You"	The Heat Is On	
1975	Smokey Robinson	"Quiet Storm"	A Quiet Storm	The genre is named after this song.
1976	Marvin Gaye	"After the Dance"	I Want You	
1976	Commodores	"Sweet Love"	Movin' On	
1976	Norman Connors	"You Are My Starship"	You Are My Starship	(vocals by Michael Henderson and Phyllis Hyman)
1976	George Benson	"This Masquerade"	Breezin'	
1976	L.T.D.	"Love Ballad"	Love to the World	
1977	The Isley Brothers	"Footsteps in the Dark"	Go for Your Guns	
1977	The Isley Brothers	"Voyage to Atlantis"	Go for Your Guns	
1977	The Gap Band	"Messin' with My Mind"	The Gap Band	
1977	Bill Withers	"Lovely Day"	Menagerie	
1977	Natalie Cole	"Peaceful Living"	Unpredictable	
1977	Phyllis Hyman	"I Don't Want to Lose You"	Phyllis Hyman	
1977	Heatwave	"Always and Forever"	Too Hot to Handle	
1977	Natalie Cole	"La Costa"	Thankful	
1978	Teddy Pendergrass	"Close the Door"	Life Is a Song Worth Singing	
1978	The O'Jays	"Use ta Be My Girl"	So Full of Love	
1978	Angela Bofill	"This Time I'll Be Sweeter"	Angie	
1978	Roberta Flack	"The Closer I Get to You"	Blue Lights in the Basement	(duet with Donny Hathaway)
1978	Peabo Bryson	"I'm So into You"	Crosswinds	
1978	Chic	"At Last I Am Free"	C'est Chic	
1978	Rose Royce	"Wishing on a Star"	Rose Royce II: In Full Bloom	
1978	Teena Marie	"Déjà Vu (I've Been Here Before)"	Wild and Peaceful	
1978	Phyllis Hyman	"The Answer Is You"	Somewhere in My Lifetime	
1978	Phyllis Hyman	"Gonna Make Changes"	Somewhere in My Lifetime	
1978	Delegation	"Oh Honey"	The Promise of Love	
1978	Ashford & Simpson	"Is It Still Good to Ya"	Is It Still Good to Ya	
1978	Quincy Jones	"I'm Gonna Miss You in the Morning"	Sounds...and Stuff Like That!!	(vocals by Luther Vandross and Patti Austin)
1978	Bobby Caldwell	"What You Won't Do for Love"	Bobby Caldwell	
1979	Herb Alpert	"Rise"	Rise	
1979	Stephanie Mills	"Feel the Fire"	What Cha' Gonna Do with My Lovin'	(duet with Teddy Pendergrass)
1979	Peaches & Herb	"Reunited"	2 Hot	
1979	The Gap Band	"No Hiding Place"	The Gap Band II	
1979	Curtis Mayfield	"Between You Baby & Me"	Heartbeat	(duet with Linda Clifford)
1979	Natalie Cole	"What You Won't Do for Love"	We're the Best of Friends	(duet with Peabo Bryson)
1979	Commodores	"Still"	Midnight Magic	
1979	Michael Jackson	"I Can't Help It"	Off the Wall	
1979	Angela Bofill	"I Try"	Angel of the Night	
1979	Smokey Robinson	"Cruisin'"	Where There's Smoke...	
1980	Kool & the Gang	"Too Hot"	Ladies' Night	
1981	Smokey Robinson	"Being With You"	Being With You	
1981	Al Jarreau	"We're in This Love Together"	Breakin' Away	
1981	Stephanie Mills	"Two Hearts"	Stephanie	(duet with Teddy Pendergrass)
1981	Rose Royce	"Golden Touch"	Rose Royce V: Golden Touch	
1981	George Benson	"Turn Your Love Around"	The George Benson Collection	
1981	Diana Ross	"Endless Love"	Endless Love	(duet with Lionel Richie)
1981	Luther Vandross	"A House is Not a Home"	Never Too Much	
1981	Grover Washington Jr.	"Just the Two of Us"	Winelight	(vocal by Bill Withers)
1981	The Gap Band	"Yearning for Your Love"	The Gap Band III	
1981	The Gap Band	"Nothin' Comes to Sleepers"	The Gap Band III	
1981	Quincy Jones	"Just Once"	The Dude	(vocal by James Ingram)
1981	Rick James	"Fire and Desire"	Street Songs	(duet with Teena Marie)
1982	Patti Austin	"Baby, Come to Me"	Every Home Should Have One	(duet with James Ingram)
1982	Marvin Gaye	"Sexual Healing"	Midnight Love	
1982	Tavares	"A Penny for Your Thoughts"	New Directions	
1982	Patrice Rushen	"Remind Me"	Straight from the Heart	
1982	Stevie Wonder	"Ribbon in the Sky"	Stevie Wonder's Original Musiquarium I	
1982	Cheryl Lynn	"If This World Were Mine"	Instant Love	(duet with Luther Vandross)
1982	Grover Washington Jr.	"The Best Is Yet to Come"	The Best Is Yet to Come	(vocal by Patti LaBelle)
1982	Michael McDonald	"I Keep Forgettin' (Every Time You're Near)"	If That's What It Takes	
1982	DeBarge	"All This Love"	All This Love	
1983	Angela Bofill	"Tonight I Give In"	Too Tough	
1983	Al Jarreau	"Mornin'"	Jarreau	
1983	Marvin Gaye	"'Til Tomorrow"	Midnight Love	
1983	The Isley Brothers	"Between the Sheets"	Between the Sheets	
1983	The Isley Brothers	"Choosey Lover"	Between the Sheets	
1983	Michael Jackson	"Human Nature"	Thriller	
1983	Michael Jackson	"Baby Be Mine"	Thriller	
1983	Michael Jackson	"The Lady in My Life"	Thriller	
1983	Peabo Bryson	"Tonight, I Celebrate My Love"	Born to Love	(duet with Roberta Flack)
1983	Dionne Warwick	"So Amazing"	How Many Times Can We Say Goodbye	
1983	Dionne Warwick	"How Many Times Can We Say Goodbye"	How Many Times Can We Say Goodbye	(duet with Luther Vandross)
1983	Art of Noise	"Moments in Love"	Into Battle with the Art of Noise	
1984	Lionel Richie	"Hello"	Can't Slow Down	
1984	Stevie Wonder	"Love Light in Flight"	The Woman in Red soundtrack	
1984	Sade	"Hang On to Your Love"	Diamond Life	
1985	Sade	"Smooth Operator"	Diamond Life	
1985	Sade	"Your Love Is King"	Diamond Life	
1985	Sade	"The Sweetest Taboo"	Promise	
1985	Billy Ocean	"Suddenly"	Suddenly	
1985	Chaka Khan	"Through the Fire"	I Feel for You	
1985	Luther Vandross	"Creepin'"	The Night I Fell in Love	
1985	Whitney Houston	"Saving All My Love for You"	Whitney Houston	
1985	Loose Ends	"Hangin' on a String (Contemplating)"	So Where Are You?	
1985	Force MDs	"Tender Love"	Krush Groove	
1985	Stevie Wonder	"Overjoyed"	In Square Circle	
1986	Kenny G	"What Does It Take (To Win Your Love)"	Duotones	(vocal by Ellis Hall)
1986	The Gap Band	"I Know We'll Make It"	Gap Band VII	
1986	Shirley Jones	"Do You Get Enough Love"	Always in the Mood	
1986	René & Angela	"You Don't Have to Cry"	Street Called Desire	
1986	Anita Baker	"Sweet Love"	Rapture	
1986	Anita Baker	"Caught Up in the Rapture"	Rapture	
1987	Anita Baker	"Same Ole Love (365 Days a Year)"	Rapture	
1987	Anita Baker	"No One in the World"	Rapture	
1987	Janet Jackson	"Funny How Time Flies (When You're Having Fun)"	Control	
1987	Peabo Bryson	"Without You"	Leonard Part 6	(duet with Regina Belle)
1987	Kashif	"Love Changes"	Love Changes	(duet with Meli'sa Morgan)
1988	Anita Baker	"Giving You the Best That I Got"	Giving You the Best That I Got	
1988	Keith Sweat	"Make It Last Forever"	Make It Last Forever	(duet with Jacci McGhee)
1988	Anita Baker	"Just Because"	Giving You the Best That I Got	
1988	Anita Baker	"Lead Me into Love"	Giving You the Best That I Got	
1988	Brenda Russell	"Piano in the Dark"	Get Here	(with Joe Esposito)
1988	Al B. Sure!	"Nite and Day"	In Effect Mode	
1988	The Deele	"Two Occasions"	Eyes of a Stranger	
1988	New Edition	"Can You Stand the Rain"	Heart Break	
1989	Michel'le	"Something in My Heart"	Michel'le	
1989	James Ingram	"I Don't Have the Heart"	It's Real	
1989	Luther Vandross	"Here and Now"	The Best of Luther Vandross... The Best of Love	
1989	Randy Crawford	"Knockin' on Heaven's Door"	Rich and Poor	
1989	Maze	"Silky Soul"	Silky Soul	
1989	Skyy	"Real Love"	Start of a Romance	
1990	Janet Jackson	"Come Back to Me"	Rhythm Nation 1814	
1990	Najee	"I'll Be Good to You"	Tokyo Blue	(vocal by Vesta Williams)
1990	Babyface	"Whip Appeal"	Tender Lover	
1990	Mariah Carey	"Vision of Love"	Mariah Carey	
1990	Whitney Houston	"All the Man That I Need"	I'm Your Baby Tonight	
1990	Quincy Jones	"The Secret Garden (Sweet Seduction Suite)"	Back on the Block	(vocals by Al B. Sure!, James Ingram, El DeBarge, and Barry White)
1990	Freddie Jackson	"Love Me Down"	Do Me Again	
1990	Mariah Carey	"Love Takes Time"	Mariah Carey	
1991	Freddie Jackson	"Do Me Again"	Do Me Again	
1991	Fourplay	"After the Dance"	Fourplay	(vocal by El DeBarge)
1991	Lisa Fischer	"How Can I Ease the Pain"	So Intense	
1991	Peabo Bryson	"Can You Stop the Rain"	Can You Stop the Rain	
1991	Teddy Pendergrass	"It Should've Been You"	Truly Blessed	
1991	Luther Vandross	"Power of Love/Love Power"	Power of Love	
1991	Tracie Spencer	"Tender Kisses"	Make the Difference	
1991	Phyllis Hyman	"When You Get Right Down to It"	Prime of My Life	
1992	Boyz II Men	"End of the Road"	Boomerang	
1992	Whitney Houston	"I Will Always Love You"	The Bodyguard	
1992	Toni Braxton	"Love Shoulda Brought You Home"	Toni Braxton	
1992	Sade	"No Ordinary Love"	Love Deluxe	
1993	Sade	"Kiss of Life"	Love Deluxe	
1993	Sade	"Cherish the Day"	Love Deluxe	
1993	Vanessa Williams	"Love Is"	Beverly Hills 90210	(duet with Brian McKnight)
1993	Jon Lucien	"Would You Believe in Me"	Mother Nature's Son	
1993	Toni Braxton	"Another Sad Love Song"	Toni Braxton	
1993	Toni Braxton	"Breathe Again"	Toni Braxton	
1993	Toni Braxton	"Seven Whole Days"	Toni Braxton	
1994	Barry White	"Practice What You Preach"	The Icon Is Love	
1994	Janet Jackson	"Any Time, Any Place"	Janet	
1994	Boyz II Men	"I'll Make Love to You"	II	
1994	Luther Vandross	"Always and Forever"	Songs	
1995	Faith Evans	"Soon as I Get Home"	Faith	
1995	Whitney Houston	"Exhale (Shoop Shoop)"	Waiting to Exhale	
1995	D'Angelo	"Brown Sugar"	Brown Sugar	
1995	TLC	"Red Light Special"	CrazySexyCool	
1995	Janet Jackson	"Twenty Foreplay"	Design of a Decade: 1986–1996	
1996	Keith Sweat	"Nobody"	Keith Sweat	(duet with Athena Cage)
1996	Maxwell	"Ascension (Don't Ever Wonder)"	Maxwell's Urban Hang Suite	
1996	Maxwell	"Whenever Wherever Whatever"	Maxwell's Urban Hang Suite	
1996	Toni Braxton	"Un-Break My Heart"	Secrets	
1997	Toni Braxton	"How Could an Angel Break My Heart"	Secrets	
1997	Toni Braxton	"Let It Flow"	Secrets	
1997	Toni Braxton	"I Love Me Some Him"	Secrets	
1997	Toni Braxton	"I Don't Want To"	Secrets	
1997	Erykah Badu	"Next Lifetime"	Baduizm	
1997	Mary J. Blige	"Missing You"	Share My World	
1997	Maxwell	"This Woman's Work"	Now	
1997	Rachelle Ferrell	"Nothing Has Ever Felt Like This"	Rachelle Ferrell	(duet with Will Downing)
1997	Walter Beasley	"Visions"	Tonight We Love	
1997	Usher	"Nice & Slow"	My Way	
1998	Monica	"Angel of Mine"	The Boy Is Mine	
1998	Jon B.	"They Don't Know"	Cool Relax	
1998	Phyllis Hyman	"Funny How Love Goes"	Forever with You	(duet with Damon Williams)
1998	Phyllis Hyman	"The Kids"	Forever with You	
1998	Dru Hill	"Beauty"	Enter the Dru	
1998	Tyrese	"Sweet Lady"	Tyrese	
1998	Lauryn Hill	"Ex-Factor"	The Miseducation of Lauryn Hill	
1999	Brandy	"(Everything I Do) I Do It for You"	Never Say Never	
1999	Case	"Happily Ever After"	Personal Conversation	
1999	Brian McKnight	"Back at One"	Back at One	
1999	Luther Vandross	"I'm Only Human"	I Know	(featuring Cassandra Wilson and Bob James)
1999	Joe	"I Wanna Know"	My Name Is Joe	
2000	D'Angelo	"Untitled (How Does It Feel)"	Voodoo	
2000	D'Angelo	"Send It On"	Voodoo	
2000	Donell Jones	"Where I Wanna Be"	Where I Wanna Be	
2000	Kelly Price	"As We Lay"	Mirror Mirror	
2000	Carl Thomas	"Lady Lay Your Body"	Emotional	
2000	Sisqó	"Incomplete"	Unleash the Dragon	
2000	Musiq Soulchild	"Love"	Aijuswanaseing	
2004	Beyoncé and Luther Vandross	"The Closer I Get to You"	Dangerously in Love and Dance with My Father	
2004	Usher	"Burn"	Confessions	
2004	Janet Jackson	"Spending Time with You"	Damita Jo	
2007	Justin Timberlake	"Until the End of Time"	FutureSex/LoveSounds	(featuring Beyoncé)
2010	Alicia Keys	"Un-Thinkable (I'm Ready)"	The Element of Freedom	
2012	Usher	"Climax"	Looking 4 Myself	
2013	Alicia Keys	"Fire We Make"	Girl on Fire	
2015	Janet Jackson	"No Sleeep"	Unbreakable	(featuring J. Cole)

== See also ==
- List of contemporary R&B ballads
- List of smooth jazz songs
- Urban contemporary
