= Phyllis Hyman (album) =

Studio album by Phyllis Hyman
- Released: April 1977
- Recorded: 1976
- Studios: Total Experience, Hollywood, California; Sigma Sound, Philadelphia, Pennsylvania; Record Plant, New York City
- Genres: R&B; soul; jazz; disco
- Length: 44:34
- Label: Buddah
- Producers: Larry Alexander, John Davis, Jerry Peters, and Sandy Torano

Phyllis Hyman chronology
Phyllis Hyman (1977)	Sing a Song (1978)

Singles from Phyllis Hyman
- 1. "Loving You – Losing You" Released: April 1977; 2. "No One Can Love You More" Released: July 1977

Professional ratings
Review scores
Source	Rating
Allmusic	4/5 stars

Phyllis Hyman is the self-titled solo debut studio album by American soul singer-songwriter Phyllis Hyman. It was released by Buddah Records in 1977. The album charted at number 107 on the Billboard 200 chart.

== Album information ==
After recording a cover version of The Stylistics' 1971 hit "Betcha by Golly, Wow" that appeared on Norman Connors' 1976 You Are My Starship album, Hyman was signed to Buddah and began work on her debut. The album featured the hits "Loving You – Losing You", and "I Don't Want to Lose You", an R&B ballad (originally recorded by The Spinners).

=== Singles ===
Two singles were released from the album, "Loving You – Losing You" and "No One Can Love You More".

An edited version of "Loving You – Losing You" appeared on most single releases worldwide. The U.S. release had the song "Children of the World" as the B-side. The original U.K. release instead had the full-length album version on the B-side. The album version was released as a Twelve-inch single in Canada in May 1977 with "One Thing On My Mind" on the B-side.

"No One Can Love You More" was only released in the United States. The single included an edited version of the song with "Deliver the Love" as the B-side.

"Loving You – Losing You" was re-released in the United Kingdom in 1980 to promote the Buddah All-Stars LP. The 7" release included the single version of the song with the single version of "Betcha by Golly, Wow" on the B-side. A 12" format was also released which contained the full-length version of "Loving You – Losing You".

=== Chart performance ===
The album peaked at no. 107 on the Billboard 200. It spent fourteen weeks on the chart following its debut on April 30, 1977. On the Top R&B/Hip-Hop Albums chart, the album peaked at no. 49, spending seven weeks on the chart.

The album's first single "Loving You – Losing You" entered the Billboard Hot R&B/Hip-Hop Songs in the week dated April 9, 1977 and peaked at no. 32 nearly two months later, spending a total of twelve weeks on the chart. The second single "No One Can Love You More" entered the same chart in the week dated July 23, 1977, spending a total of ten weeks on the chart and peaking at no. 58 a month after its first entry.

=== Reissues ===
The album was first released on CD in 1996 in Canada by the label Unidisc Music. This edition included the full-length version of "Betcha by Golly, Wow" as a bonus track. The album's first CD release in the United States was in 1997 via The Right Stuff Records. SoulMusic Records released an expanded version of the album in the United Kingdom in 2013 titled The Buddah Years which included four bonus songs recorded during her time with Buddah Records, three of which were originally released on the album Sing a Song. In 2015 the label Funkytowngrooves released their own expanded edition in the United States with five bonus tracks. The 2021 boxset Old Friend: The Deluxe Collection 1976–1998 included another expanded edition of the album with six bonus tracks, including three songs from the Norman Connors album You Are My Starship.

=== Out-takes ===
In 1996 RCA records issued the compilation album Loving You, Losing You, The Classic Balladry of Phyllis Hyman, which included a previously unreleased track from the 1977 recording session, "Sounds Like a Love Song".

Another unreleased song from the album, titled "You're the One", has been released several times over the years. It first appeared on the 2002 reissue of You Know How to Love Me. It also appeared on the 2015 reissue of the same album and on the 2008 expanded edition of Can't We Fall in Love Again?. SoulMusic Records included this song on their 2013 reissue of Phyllis Hyman's debut album and the 2021 box set Old Friend: The Deluxe Collection 1976–1998.

== Reception ==
"Loving You – Losing You" received a positive review in Billboard magazine, noting Hyman's "clear, communicative vocal style" which brought "elegance and energy" to the "crossover ballad" with "tasty orchestration".

== Track listing ==
Side one
No.	Title	Writer(s)	Length
1.	"Loving You – Losing You"	Thom Bell; LeRoy Bell	7:27
2.	"No One Can Love You More"	Skip Scarborough	4:23
3.	"One Thing on My Mind"	Evie Sands; Richard Germinaro	5:30
4.	"I Don't Want to Lose You"	Thom Bell; Linda Creed	5:31
5.	"Deliver the Love"	Onaje Allan Gumbs; Ausar Sahw Rachim	3:59

Side two
No.	Title	Writer(s)	Length
6.	"Was Yesterday Such a Long Time Ago"	M. Goode; Buddy Scott	4:36
7.	"Night Bird Gets the Love"	Muhyi Shakoor; Clifford Carter	5:21
8.	"Beautiful Man of Mine"	Larry Alexander	6:58
9.	"Children of the World"	Hubert Eaves III	3:01
Total length:			46:50

1996 Canadian CD bonus track – Unidisc BDK-5681
No.	Title	Writer(s)	Length
10.	"Betcha by Golly Wow"	Thom Bell; Linda Creed	6:18

2013 The Buddah Years UK CD edition bonus tracks – SoulMusic Records SMCR 5101
No.	Title	Writer(s)	Length
10.	"You're the One"	John Davis	5:23
11.	"Soon Come Again"	Larry Alexander; Sandy Torano	3:35
12.	"Be Careful (How You Treat My Love)"	Gary Glenn	4:18
13.	"The Answer is You"	Mark Radice	5:09

2015 US Expanded CD edition bonus tracks – Funkytowngrooves FTG-411
No.	Title	Writer(s)	Length
10.	"Betcha by Golly Wow" (7" version)	Thom Bell; Linda Creed	3:47
11.	"Loving You, Losing You" (7" version)	Thom Bell	3:40
12.	"No One Can Love You More" (7" version)	Skip Scarborough	3:36
13.	"Baby (I'm Gonna Love You)" (7" version)	Larry Alexander	3:35
14.	"Do Me" (7" version)	Hiram Bullock; Larry Alexander	3:04

== Personnel ==
- Phyllis Hyman - vocals
- Larry Alexander – backing vocals
- Maxine Anderson – backing vocals
- Gary Bartz - alto saxophone
- Errol "Crusher" Bennett – percussion
- Carla Benson – Backing vocals
- Evette Benton – Backing vocals
- Hiram Bullock – guitar
- Cecil Bridgewater – trumpet
- Charles Collins – drums
- Ann Esther – backing vocals
- John Davis – keyboards, arranger
- Hubert Eaves III – piano, Moog synthesizer, arranger
- Scott Edwards – bass guitar
- Michael "Sugar Bear" Foreman – bass guitar
- Jim Gilstrap – backing vocals
- Onaje Allan Gumbs – piano, keyboards, arranger, conductor
- Billy Harner – backing vocals
- Dennis Harris – guitar
- Barbara Ingram – backing vocals
- Anthony Jackson – bass guitar
- Virgil Jones – trumpet
- Steve Jordan – drums
- Will Lee – bass guitar
- John Lehman – backing vocals
- Victor Lewis – drums
- Bill Lowe – trombone
- Reggie Lucas – guitar
- Harvey Mason, Sr. – timpani
- Andy Newmark – drums
- Jerry Peters – keyboards, arranger
- Greg Poree – guitar
- Raymond Pounds – drums
- Janice Robinson – trombone
- Richie Rome – keyboards
- John Rowin – guitar
- Skip Scarborough – keyboards
- Craig Snyder – guitar
- Jerry Steinholtz – drums
- Charles Sullivan – trumpet
- Sandy Torano – guitar, backing vocals
- Larry Washington – percussion
- Nathan Watts - bass guitar
- Gregory Williams – French horn
- Kiane Zawadi – trombone

=== Production ===
- Producers: Larry Alexander, John Davis, Jerry Peters, Sandy Torano
- Arrangers: John Davis, Jerry Peters, Onaje Allan Gumbs
- Engineer: Fred Torchio
- Production Coordination: Bernadette Fauver
- Liner Notes: David Nathan
- Art Direction: Milton Sincoff
- Photography: Joel Brodsky
- Executive Producer: Lewis Merenstein

== Charts ==
Chart (1977)	Peak position
US Billboard 200	107
US Top R&B/Hip-Hop Albums (Billboard)	49
