= Denzil Miller =

- Born: 30 April 1951
- Died: 30 November 2019 (aged 68); Hobart, Tasmania
- Education: University of Tasmania; University of Wollongong; University of Cape Town
- Spouse: Jenny
- Scientific career
- Fields: Marine Science

Denzil George Miller (30 April 1951 — 30 November 2019) was a marine scientist and expert on Antarctic conservation, fisheries, policy and governance.

== Early life and education ==
Miller grew up in Zambia and attended school in Zimbabwe. He went on to gain a PhD in marine biology from the University of Cape Town.

== Career ==
Miller worked as a scientist for the Marine and Coastal Affairs branch of South Africa's Department of Environmental Affairs for 23 years, from 1979 until 2002. During this time, he attended the Commission for the Conservation of Antarctic Marine Living Resources (CCAMLR) as a member of the South African delegation. He convened the Commission's Working Group on Krill (1987 to 1994) and chaired its scientific committee (1997 to 2000).

He served as the Executive Secretary for CCAMLR from 2002 until 2010.

From 2003 until 2008, Miller chaired the United Nations Food and Agriculture Organization's Regional Fisheries Bodies Secretariat Network.

In 2011, he was appointed as director of Antarctic Tasmania’s Science and Research Unit.

Miller was the Tasmanian representative on the Forum of Australian Chief Scientists from 2012 until 2017.

== Awards ==
In 1995, Miller was awarded the South African Antarctic Medal and the BP Antarctic Award.

In October 2007, he was one of six international recipients to be awarded the Duke of Edinburgh Conservation Medal for his contributions to Antarctic conservation and fisheries management.

In 2011, he was made a member of the Order of Australia, recognizing his service to the conservation of Antarctic Marine Life.
