= Sing a Song (album) =

Studio album by Phyllis Hyman
- Released: 1978
- Genre: R&B; soul; jazz; disco; pop
- Length: 44:55
- Label: Buddah
- Producer: Larry Alexander, Skip Scarborough

Phyllis Hyman chronology
Phyllis Hyman (1977)	Sing a Song (1978)	Somewhere in My Lifetime (1978)

Singles from Somewhere in My Lifetime
- 1. "Living Inside Your Love" Released: 1978

Professional ratings
Review scores
Source	Rating
Allmusic	4/5 stars

Sing a Song is the second studio album by American singer Phyllis Hyman, her second release off Buddah Records, in 1978. Shortly after its release, Buddah Records became defunct and sold off to Arista Records, who signed Hyman to the label in late 1978. Many of the songs on this album were later included in her third album, Somewhere in My Lifetime, later in 1978

== Background ==
In 1977 Buddah Records released Hyman's self-titled debut LP, which featured the singles "Loving You, Losing You" and "No One Can Love You More". Her second album with the label, Sing a Song, was not released in the United States, but was released in the United Kingdom, France, Australia and Japan. After Buddah Records became defunct, Hyman signed to Arista Records. Her premiere album for the label Somewhere in My Lifetime, was released in 1978. Somewhere in My Lifetime included several tracks that Phyllis had recorded for a 2nd album at Buddah titled Sing A Song.

=== Singles ===
"Living Inside Your Love" was the only single released from the album and was only issued in the United Kingdom. The 7" single included an edit of the song with "Love is Free" on the B-side. A 12" single was also released containing the full-length version of the song with the full-length version of "Loving You, Losing You" on the B-side.

=== Reissues ===
Due to being replaced by Somewhere in My Lifetime, the original Sing a Song version of the album was only reissued once in 1996 in Canada by the label Kama Sutra on Compact Disc with two bonus tracks – "Can't We Fall in Love Again?" from the album of the same name and "We Both Need Each Other" from the Norman Connors LP You Are My Starship. Both bonus tracks were duets with Michael Henderson.

== Track listing ==
Tracks 1, 3, 6–9 were later included on Somewhere in My Lifetime.

Side one
No.	Title	Writer(s)	Length
1.	"Living Inside Your Love"	Skip Scarborough; Renee Taylor	6:14
2.	"Sweet Music"	Al Martinez	3:51
3.	"The Answer Is You"	Mark Radice	5:04
4.	"Love Is Free"	Mark Radice	3:49

Side two
No.	Title	Writer(s)	Length
5.	"Sing a Song"	Philip Bailey; Ernest Straughter	3:39
6.	"Gonna Make Changes"	Phyllis Hyman	3:54
7.	"Soon Come Again"	Larry Alexander; Sandy Torano	3:27
8.	"Be Careful (How You Treat My Love)"	Garry Glenn	4:19
9.	"Here's That Rainy Day"	Jimmy Van Heusen; Johnny Burke	3:02

1996 Canadian CD bonus tracks – Kama Sutra BDK-5711
No.	Title	Writer(s)	Length
10.	"Can't We Fall in Love Again?" (Duet with Michael Henderson)	John Lewis Parker; Peter Ivers	3:41
11.	"We Both Need Each Other" (Duet with Michael Henderson)	Michael Henderson	4:04
