= Looking Out =

Studio album by McCoy Tyner
- Released: 1982
- Recorded: 1982
- Genre: Jazz
- Label: Columbia

McCoy Tyner chronology
La Leyenda de La Hora (1981)	Looking Out (1982)	Love & Peace (1982)

Professional ratings
Review scores
Source	Rating
Allmusic	1.5/5 stars
The Rolling Stone Jazz Record Guide	2/5 stars

Looking Out is an album by the jazz pianist McCoy Tyner released on the Columbia label in 1982. It has performances by Tyner with Carlos Santana, Stanley Clarke, Gary Bartz, vocalist Phyllis Hyman and a string section.

== Reception ==
The Allmusic review by Scott Yanow states "the music is quite forgettable. Tyner plays well and with as much passion as usual but one can clearly sense that not all of the musicians were recording the music at the same time for they rarely react to each other's presence. One of the great pianist's weaker efforts". Album is currently out of print in the US and is only available as an import on CD. "Senior Carlos" featuring Carlos Santana and "In Search Of My Heart" featuring Phyllis Hyman are considered to be the high points of an otherwise polarizing album.

== Track listing ==
1. "Love Surrounds Us Everywhere" - 5:15
2. "Hannibal" (Lighterwood, Pasqua, Rekow, Santana) - 7:04
3. "I'll Be Around" (Clarke, Tyner) - 6:12
4. "Señor Carlos" - 7:54
5. "In Search of My Heart" - 7:07
6. "Island Birdie" - 5:16

All compositions by McCoy Tyner except as indicated

== Personnel ==
- McCoy Tyner – piano, synthesizer
- Gary Bartz – alto saxophone
- Carlos Santana – guitar
- Charles W. Johnson, Jr. – guitar
- Denzil Miller – synthesizer
- James W. Alexander – synthesizer
- Stanley Clarke – electric bass, double bass
- Buddy Williams – drums
- Ndugu Leon Chancler – drums
- Ignacio Berroa – percussion
- Jerry González – percussion
- Phyllis Hyman – vocals
- Unidentified string section and horn section
