= Somewhere in My Lifetime =

Studio album by Phyllis Hyman
- Released: January 10, 1979
- Recorded: 1977–1978
- Genres: R&B; pop; MOR
- Length: 42:39
- Label: Arista
- Producers: Larry Alexander, Skip Scarborough, Barry Manilow, Ron Dante, Theodore Life

Phyllis Hyman chronology
Sing a Song (1978)	Somewhere in My Lifetime (1979)	You Know How to Love Me (1979)

Singles from Somewhere in My Lifetime
- 1. "Somewhere in My Lifetime" Released: December 1978; 2. "Kiss You All Over" / "So Strange" Released: April 1979

Somewhere in My Lifetime is the third studio album by singer Phyllis Hyman. It was released by Arista Records in 1979, becoming Hyman's debut Arista release (see 1979 in music).

== Background ==
Six of the tracks first appeared on her previous album, Sing a Song, on Buddah Records. Three tracks were produced by Theodore Life, with the title track co-produced and arranged by Barry Manilow. "Kiss You All Over" was one of the newly recorded tracks for this album and was a cover of the hit single by the band Exile, which reached number one on the Billboard Hot 100 a few months before the album was released.

=== Singles ===
Both singles from this album were only released in North America.

The first single "Somewhere in My Lifetime" was released in December 1978. The single contained the album version with "Gonna Make Changes" as the B-side. It peaked at no. 12 on the Billboard Hot R&B/Hip-Hop Songs chart, spending 16 weeks on that chart in total.

The second single was a double A-side release containing "So Strange" and "Kiss You All Over". The 7" single contained edited versions of both songs. A promotional 12" single was also released with extended versions of both songs. The double A-side single did not chart on the R&B/Hip-Hop Songs chart, but did reach no. 75 on the Billboard Dance Club Songs chart, becoming her second entry on this chart.

=== Reissues ===
Somewhere in My Lifetime received its first Compact Disc release in Japan on September 22, 1999. The first CD release in the United States did not come until 2010 when Reel Music released an expanded edition of the album with the 12" versions of "Kiss You All Over" and "So Strange" as bonus tracks. SoulMusic Records released their own expanded edition in 2013 in the United Kingdom, with the aforementioned 12" versions added as bonus tracks, as well as the three songs from Sing a Song that did not make it onto Somewhere in My Lifetime on its original release. SoulMusic Records expanded the album further in the 2021 boxset Old Friend: The Deluxe Collection 1976–1998 with a sixth bonus track – the song "As You Are" from the Pharoah Sanders album Love Will Find a Way.

== Critical reception ==
Professional ratings
Review scores
Source	Rating
AllMusic	3/5 stars
The Virgin Encyclopedia of R&B and Soul	3/5 stars

The Bay State Banner deemed the album "black MOR," writing that most of the songs are "so marginal that Hyman's talents wind up buried in dross, stale arrangement and meandering production." Billboard complimented Hyman's vocals while noting that there was "a little bit of soul, a bit of mild disco, and more than enough of an MOR flavor to this package".

The single "Kiss You All Over" was listed by Billboard as one of its recommended Soul singles for the week of March 31, 1979.

== Track listing ==
Tracks 4, 6–10 were first released on Sing a Song.

Side one
No.	Title	Writer(s)	Length
1.	"Kiss You All Over"	Mike Chapman; Nicky Chinn	5:14
2.	"Somewhere in My Lifetime"	Jesus Alvarez	3:30
3.	"Lookin' for a Lovin'"	Phyllis Brown; Barry Goldberg	2:58
4.	"The Answer Is You"	Mark Radice	5:09
5.	"So Strange"	Theodore Life; Billy Green	4:40

Side two
No.	Title	Writer(s)	Length
6.	"Gonna Make Changes"	Phyllis Hyman	3:58
7.	"Living Inside Your Love"	Skip Scarborough; Renee Taylor	6:14
8.	"Be Careful (How You Treat My Love)"	Garry Glenn	4:12
9.	"Soon Come Again"	Larry Alexander; Sandy Torano	3:36
10.	"Here's That Rainy Day"	Jimmy Van Heusen; Johnny Burke	3:02

2010 U.S. Expanded edition bonus tracks – Arista/Reel Music A761660
No.	Title	Writer(s)	Length
11.	"Kiss You All Over" (12" version)	Mike Chapman; Nicky Chinn	6:18
12.	"So Strange" (12" version)	Theodore Life; Billy Green	9:02

2013 U.K. Expanded edition bonus tracks – SoulMusic Records SMCR 5092
No.	Title	Writer(s)	Length
11.	"So Strange" (12" version)	Theodore Life; Billy Green	9:02
12.	"Kiss You All Over" (12" version)	Mike Chapman; Nicky Chinn	6:18
13.	"Sweet Music"	Al Martinez	3:51
14.	"Love Is Free"	Mark Radice	3:49
15.	"Sing a Song"	Philip Bailey; Ernest Straughter	3:39

== Personnel ==
- Phyllis Hyman - vocals
- Leo Adamian - drums
- Larry Alexander - backing vocals
- Monty Alexander - piano
- Bob Babbitt - bass guitar
- Rubens Bassini - percussion
- Diva Gray - backing vocals
- Gordon Grody - backing vocals
- Onaje Allan Gumbs - piano
- Herbie Hancock - piano
- Azar Lawrence - alto saxophone
- Will Lee - bass guitar
- Theodore Life - guitar, backing vocals
- Steve Love - guitar
- Jimmy Maelen - percussion
- Al Martinez - backing vocals
- Sid McGinnis - guitar
- Nate Neblett - drums
- Sam Peake - backing vocals
- Sylvia Pichler - backing vocals
- Steve Robbins - synthesizer, piano
- John Rowin - guitar
- Louis Russell - guitar
- Robert Russell - bass guitar
- Paul Shaffer - piano
- Jocelyn Shaw - backing vocals
- Michael Stanton - piano
- Ernest Straughter - piano
- Bill Summers - percussion
- Sybil Thomas - backing vocals
- Ronnie Zito - drums

Production

- Producer: Larry Alexander and Skip Scarborough (Tracks 4, 6 and 8–10); Theodore Life (Tracks 1, 3 and 5); Barry Manilow and Ron Dante (Track 2)
- Arranger: Monty Alexander, Dave Crawford, Onaje Allan Gumbs, Skip Scarborough
- Engineers: Don Cody, Michael DeLugg, Rick Rowe, William Wittman
- Mastering: Cozy Noda and Jack Skinner

== Charts ==
Chart (1979)	Peak position
US Billboard 200	70
US Top R&B/Hip-Hop Albums (Billboard)	15
