= Love Will Find a Way (Pharoah Sanders album) =

Studio album by Pharoah Sanders
- Released: 1978
- Recorded: 1977
- Studio: Kendun Recorders, Burbank, California
- Genre: Jazz, R&B
- Length: 38:29
- Label: Arista; AB-4161
- Producer: Norman Connors

Pharoah Sanders chronology
| Pharoah (1976) | Love Will Find a Way (1978) | Journey to the One (1980) |

Love Will Find a Way is an album by saxophonist Pharoah Sanders. It was recorded in Burbank, California, in 1977, and was released in 1978 by Arista Records. On the album, which was produced by Norman Connors, Sanders is joined by a large ensemble of musicians.

Love Will Find a Way, which features vocalist Phyllis Hyman, was Sanders' first release on Arista, and represented a turn toward more commercial music. According to writer Tom Terrell, the album "became a quiet storm classic, sold pretty well, revived Hyman's career and positioned Pharoah as heir-apparent to Grover Washington Jr.'s throne." In an interview, however, Sanders stated that he resisted being pigeonholed, commenting "No, I ain't gonna be that way, it's either me or else."

The song "Love Will Find a Way" appears as the closing track on Philip Bailey's 2019 album of the same name.

== Reception ==
Professional ratings
Review scores
| Source | Rating |
|---|---|
| AllMusic | 3/5 stars |
| DownBeat | 2/5 stars |
| The Encyclopedia of Popular Music | 2/5 stars |
| The Rolling Stone Album Guide | 3/5 stars |

A writer for Billboard called the album "a soothing, mood setting collection of instrumentally oriented cuts." The Ottawa Citizen concluded that "the idea behind the album is a gentle one, a relief from the bitterness and tension so dominant in much of avant garde and free jazz, but Sanders doesn't sound at home here."

== Track listing ==
1. "Love Will Find a Way" (Bedria Sanders) – 5:12
2. "Pharomba" (Pharoah Sanders) – 4:32
3. "Love Is Here" (Pharoah Sanders) – 4:43
4. "Got to Give It Up" (Marvin Gaye) – 6:29
5. "As You Are" (Norman Connors, Paul Smith) – 5:08
6. "Answer Me My Love" (Carl Sigman, Fred Rauch, Gerhard Winkler) – 6:42
7. "Everything I Have Is Good" (Pharoah Sanders) – 6:00

== Personnel ==
- Pharoah Sanders – tenor saxophone, soprano saxophone, percussion
- Terry Harrington – saxophone
- William Green – saxophone
- Ernie Watts – reeds
- Charles Findley – trumpet
- Oscar Brashear – trumpet
- George Bohanon – trombone
- Lew McCreary – trombone
- Sidney Muldrow – French horn
- Vincent DeRosa – French horn
- Hubert Eaves III – keyboards
- Khalid Moss – keyboards
- Bobby Lyle – keyboards
- David T. Walker – electric guitar
- Wah Wah Watson – electric guitar
- Alex Blake – bass (tracks 1 and 3)
- Donny Beck – bass (tracks 1, 4, 5, and 7)
- Eddie Watson – bass (track 6)
- Phyllis Hyman – vocals (tracks 3, 5, and 7)
- Norman Connors – timpani, drums, percussion, gong, vocals
- Kenneth Nash – congas, bongos, cymbal, gong, percussion
- James Gadson – drums (tracks 1, 4, and 7)
- Lenny White – drums (tracks 2 and 3)
- Raymond Pounds – drums (tracks 5 and 6)
- The Water Family – backing vocals
