= Living All Alone =

Studio album by Phyllis Hyman
- Released: August 15, 1986
- Studio: Sigma Sound, Philadelphia, Pennsylvania
- Genre: R&B; soul; funk
- Length: 40:04
- Label: Philadelphia Int'l, Manhattan, Capitol
- Producer: Thom Bell: Kenny Gamble; Reggie Griffin; Leon Huff; Nick Martinelli; Dexter Wansel

Phyllis Hyman chronology
Goddess of Love (1983)	Living All Alone (1986)	Prime of My Life (1991)

Singles from Living All Alone
- 1. "Old Friend" Released: August 1986; 2. "Living All Alone" Released: December 1986; 3. "Screaming at the Moon" Released: March 1987; 4. "Ain't You Had Enough Love" Released: April 1987; 5. "You Just Don't Know" Released: 1987

Living All Alone is the seventh album by American soul singer-songwriter Phyllis Hyman. It was released by Philadelphia International Records in 1986. The album contains the title track, which peaked at No. 12 on the Billboard R&B singles chart and has become one of Hyman's most well-known hits.

== Background ==
=== Singles ===
"Old Friend" was released as the first single from the album in the United States. It entered the Billboard Hot Black Singles chart on August 30, 1986, and peaked at no. 14 in the week dated November 1, 1986. The 7" single included a shortened version of the song with the album version of "Screaming at the Moon" on the b-side. A 12" single was also released, which contained a total of four tracks; the short and full-length album versions of "Old Friend", and the album and extended versions of "Screaming at the Moon".

"Living All Alone" was the second U.S. single from the album. It entered the Billboard Hot Black Singles chart on December 20, 1986, and peaked at no. 12 in the week dated March 7, 1987. The 7" single included a shortened version of the song with "What You Won't Do for Love" as the b-side. A promotional 12" release included a rare 'Special Edit' of the song which was a minute longer than the album version.

"Ain't You Had Enough Love" was released as the third U.S. single. It entered the Billboard Hot Black Singles on May 9, 1987, and peaked at no. 29 on July 11, 1987. The 7" single included the album version of the track with "First Time Together" on the b-side. The 12" single included an extended version of the song. A promotional 12" release additionally included an instrumental and the 'Percussapella' mix.

"You Just Don't Know" was the final U.S. single from Living All Alone. The 7" single included the album version of the song with "Slow Dancin'" on the b-side. A promotional 12" single was also released, but unlike previous singles it contained the same content as the 7" single. "You Just Don't Know" was the only single from the album which did not enter the Billboard Hot Black Singles.

"Screaming at the Moon" was released as a single in the United Kingdom, entering the singles chart on April 4, 1987, at its peak position of no. 83, staying on the chart for three weeks. The U.K. 7" single included a shortened version of the song with the album version of "Ain't You Had Enough Love" on the b-side. The 12" single included the extended and album versions of "Screaming at the Moon". The b-side "Ain't You Had Enough Love" had a promotional 12" release in the United Kingdom, containing the extended and 'Percussapella' versions.

== Reception ==
Professional ratings
Review scores
Source	Rating
Allmusic	4/5 stars

Jason Elias of Allmusic called Living All Alone "one of Hyman's finest efforts" with "top-notch" vocals, though noted that there was "a sense of melancholy" apparent throughout the album.

== Track listing ==
Side one
No.	Title	Writer(s)	Producer(s)	Length
1.	"Living All Alone"	Cynthia Biggs; Kenneth Gamble; Dexter Wansel	Wansel	5:09
2.	"First Time Together"	Biggs; Gamble; Thom Bell	T. Bell; Gamble	4:02
3.	"If You Want Me"	Reggie Griffin; Junior Giscombe	Griffin	4:19
4.	"Slow Dancin'"	T. Bell; LeRoy Bell; Casey James	T. Bell	4:24

Side two
No.	Title	Writer(s)	Producer(s)	Length
5.	"Old Friend"	Linda Creed	T. Bell	4:51
6.	"You Just Don't Know"	Biggs; Gamble; T. Bell	T. Bell; Gamble	4:15
7.	"Ain't You Had Enough Love?"	Carl McIntosh; Jane Eugene; Steve Nichol	Nick Martinelli	4:12
8.	"Screaming at the Moon"	Wayne Wallace; Ronald Hollins	Martinelli	4:09
9.	"What You Won't Do For Love"	Bobby Caldwell; Alfons Kettner	Martinelli	4:09
Total length:				40:04

Bonus track on 2005 reissue (with Prime of My Life) – Edsel Records MEDCD 808
No.	Title	Writer(s)	Producer	Length
10.	"Run Jesse Run" (with Lou Rawls and Rev. James Cleveland)	Bunny Sigler; Cary Gilbert; Gamble; Leon Huff	Bunny Sigler	6:33
Total length:				46:37

== Personnel ==
- Phyllis Hyman – vocals, background whistling (1), backing vocals (7–9), vocal arrangements (7, 8)
- Randy Cantor – keyboards (1, 7, 8), rhythm arrangements (7, 8)
- Dexter Wansel – keyboards (1), arrangements (1)
- Thom Bell – acoustic piano (2, 4–6), synthesizers (2, 4–6), arrangements (2, 4–6)
- Casey James – synthesizers (2, 4–6), percussion (2, 4–6)
- Reggie Griffin –synthesizers (3), lead guitar (3), guitars (3), bass guitar (3), drum programming (3), saxophone (3), arrangements (3)
- Kae Williams Jr. – keyboards (7, 8), bass (7, 8), acoustic piano (8), Ensoniq Mirage solo (8)
- Terry Burrus – keyboards (9), Linn 9000 (9)
- Joe Fusco – guitars (1)
- Herb Smith – guitars (1)
- LeRoy Bell – guitars (2, 4–6), drums (2, 4–6), percussion (2, 4–6)
- Ron Jennings – guitars (7, 8)
- Michael Dino Campbell – guitars (9)
- Steve Green – bass (1)
- Alvin Moody – bass guitar (9)
- Clifford "Pete" Rudd – drums (1)
- Jim Salamone – drums (7, 8), percussion (7, 8), rhythm arrangements (7, 8)
- Doug Nally – drums (9)
- Daryl Burgee – percussion (7, 8)
- Mayra Casales – percussion (9)
- Greg Scott – tenor saxophone (1)
- Sam Peake – sax solo (7)
- Ron Kerber – soprano saxophone (9)
- Brian Castor – trombone (1)
- Joseph Smithers Jr. – trumpet (1), flugelhorn (1)
- Studio Brass – horns (8)
- Nick Martinelli – rhythm arrangements (7, 8), vocal arrangements (7, 8), percussion (8)
- Larry Davis – horn arrangements (8)
- Cindy Mizelle – backing vocals (3)
- Audrey Wheeler – backing vocals (3)
- Carla L. Benson – backing vocals (4)
- Evette Benton – backing vocals (4)
- Deborah Siler-Young – backing vocals (4)
- Cuca Echevarria – backing vocals (8)
- Juanita Johnson – backing vocals (8)
- James King – backing vocals (8)
- John King – backing vocals (8)
- Terri Wells – backing vocals (8)
- Lou Rawls – vocals (10)
- James Cleveland – vocals (10)
- Josie James – backing vocals (10)

== Production ==
- Thom Bell – executive producer
- Kenny Gamble – executive producer
- Leon Huff – executive producer
- Eileen Whelihan – coordinator (7, 8)
- Peter Humphreys – recording
- Arthur Stoppe – recording
- Michael Tarsia – recording, mixing
- Randy Abrams – assistant engineer
- John Cramer – assistant engineer
- Scott E. MacMinn – assistant engineer
- Jean-Claude "Poke" Olivier – assistant engineer
- Adam Silverman – assistant engineer
- Frankford/Wayne Mastering Labs (New York, NY) – mastering location
- Paula Scher – cover art direction
- Jean Pagliuso – photography
- Rick Gillette – set environment
- Cassandra McShepard – wardrobe
- Allan Forbes – make-up
- Dan Wintrode – hair stylist
- Gracia, Francis & Associates – management

== Charts ==
Chart (1986)	Peak position
UK Albums (OCC)	97
US Billboard 200	78
US Top R&B/Hip-Hop Albums (Billboard)	11
