= Don't Wanna Change the World =

Single by Phyllis Hyman

from the album Prime of My Life
- Released: June 1991
- Genre: R&B
- Length: 4:09 (Single version); 5:22 (Album version)
- Label: Philadelphia International Records
- Songwriters: Jonathan Rosen; Karen Manno; David Darlington
- Producer: Nick Martinelli

Phyllis Hyman singles chronology
| "Obsession" (1990) | "Don't Wanna Change the World" (1991) | "Living in Confusion" (1991) |

"Don't Wanna Change the World" is a song written by David Darlington. Karen Manno and Jonathan Rosen and recorded by American R&B singer Phyllis Hyman, taken from her eighth studio album, Prime of My Life. The hit song spent one week at number-one on the US R&B chart in September 1991, becoming Hyman's only career number-one hit.

== Track listing ==
Cassette single

1. "Don't Wanna Change the World" (Rap version) – 5:22
2. "Don't Wanna Change the World" (No Rap version) – 4:09

CD Promo single

1. "Don't Wanna Change the World" (No Rap version) – 4:09
2. "Don't Wanna Change the World" (Rap version) – 5:22
3. "Don't Wanna Change the World" (Extended Rap version) – 6:58

12" Promo single

1. "Don't Wanna Change the World" (Extended Rap version) – 6:58
2. "Don't Wanna Change the World" (No Rap version) – 4:09
3. "Don't Wanna Change the World" (Rap version) – 5:22

== Weekly charts ==
Weekly chart performance for "Don't Wanna Change the World"
| Chart (1991) | Peak position |
|---|---|
| US Hot R&B/Hip-Hop Songs (Billboard) | 1 |

== See also ==
- List of number-one R&B singles of 1991 (U.S.)
