= You Know How to Love Me (song) =

Single by Phyllis Hyman

from the album You Know How to Love Me
- Released: 1979
- Genre: Soul; disco
- Length: 3:47 (single); 7:37 (extended)
- Label: Arista Records
- Songwriter(s): Reggie Lucas; James Mtume
- Producer(s): Reggie Lucas; James Mtume

Phyllis Hyman singles chronology
"Kiss You All Over" (1979)	"You Know How to Love Me" (1979)	"Under Your Spell" (1980)

"You Know How to Love Me" is a song by Phyllis Hyman. It was released in 1979 as a single from her fourth studio album of the same name.

Released during the disco era, the song was one of Hyman's most successful releases. Despite bubbling under the Hot 100, it peaked at number six on the disco chart, becoming her biggest hit on that chart. It also peaked at number twelve on the Hot Soul Singles chart.

== Track listings ==
- U.S. 7-inch single – Arista AS 0463
  U.K. 7-inch single – Arista ARIST 323
1. "You Know How to Love Me" (Edited version) – 3:29
2. "Give a Little More" – 4:04
- U.K. 12-inch single – Arista 12 ARIST 12323
1. "You Know How to Love Me" (LP version) – 7:34
2. "Give a Little More" – 4:04
- U.K. 7-inch single (1986 re-issue) – Arista ARIST 669
1. "You Know How to Love Me" (Edited version) – 3:29
2. "We Should Be Lovers" – 3:56
- U.K. 12-inch single (1986 re-issue) – Arista ARIST 12669
1. "You Know How to Love Me" (LP version) – 7:34
2. "Riding the Tiger" (LP version) – 6:20
3. "We Should Be Lovers" – 3:56

== Chart performance ==
Chart (1979–1986)	Peak position
US Billboard Bubbling Under Hot 100	101
US Billboard Hot Black Singles	12
US Billboard Hot Dance Club Play	6
UK Singles (OCC)	47
UK Singles (OCC); 1986 re-release	89
