= Prime of My Life =

Studio album by Phyllis Hyman
- Released: June 11, 1991
- Recorded: 1989–1991
- Genre: R&B; soul
- Label: Philadelphia Int'l / Zoo Entertainment / BMG
- Producer: Nick Martinelli, Kenneth Gamble, Terry Burruss, Roland Chambers, Marti Sharron, Gene McDanields

Phyllis Hyman chronology
Living All Alone (1986)	Prime of My Life (1991)	I Refuse to Be Lonely (1995)

Singles from Prime of My Life
- 1. "Don't Wanna Change the World" Released: May 1991; 2. "Living in Confusion" Released: November 1991; 3. "When You Get Right Down to It" Released: January 1992; 4. "I Found Love" Released: May 1992

Professional ratings
Review scores
Source	Rating
Allmusic	4/5 stars

Prime of My Life is the eighth studio album by American soul singer-songwriter Phyllis Hyman.

It was released by Philadelphia International Records on June 11, 1991 and featured "Don't Wanna Change the World", which peaked at #1 on the US Billboard R&B chart. Both the album and single were RIAA certified gold on September 24, 1992. The album charted at #10 on the Billboard R&B chart and #117 on the Billboard 200.

Prime of My Life was the final studio album released during Hyman's lifetime, after which she took her own life four years later.

== Track listing ==
No.	Title	Writer(s)	Producer(s)	Length
1.	"When You Get Right Down to It"	Nick Martinelli; Reginald Hines	Martinelli	4:20
2.	"I Found Love"	Jonathan Rosen; Karen Manno	Martinelli	4:25
3.	"Don't Wanna Change the World"	Rosen; Manno; David Darlington	Martinelli	5:21
4.	"Prime of My Life"	Preston Glass; Alan Glass	Martinelli	5:12
5.	"When I Give My Love (This Time)"	Kenneth Gamble; Roland Chambers	Gamble; Chambers	7:03
6.	"I Can’t Take It Anymore"	Martinelli; Hines	Martinelli	4:20
7.	"Walk Away"	Marti Sharron; Kenny Hirsch	Sharron	4:26
8.	"Living in Confusion"	Gamble; Terry Burrus; Phyllis Hyman	Gamble; Burrus	7:06
9.	"Meet Me on the Moon"	Gene McDaniels; Carrie Thompson	McDaniels	6:42
10.	"Whatever Happened to Our Love"	Gamble; Burrus	Gamble; Burrus	4:07
Total length:				53:00

Japanese bonus track – RCA BVCP 184
No.	Title	Writer(s)	Length
11.	"Hottest Love Around"	Doug James; Sue Shifrin	4:28
Total length:			57:28

== Personnel ==
- Donna Allen - background vocals
- Art Baron - trombone
- Steven Bernstein - trumpet
- Art Bessen - trombone
- Cynthia Biggs - background vocals
- Harry Bower - trumpet
- Randy Bowland - guitar
- Daryl Burgee - percussion
- Randy Cantor - keyboards
- Damaris Carbough - background vocals
- Roland Chambers - guitar
- Gerald Chavis - trumpet
- Lawrence Cottrell - background vocals
- Dave Darlington - bass, keyboards
- Lynn Davis - background vocals
- Curtis Dowd, Jr. - keyboards
- Sonny Emory - drums
- Charlie Ernst - synthesizer, drums, drum programming, keyboards
- Jack Faith - saxophone
- John Gitlutin - keyboards
- Steve Gordon - guitar, rhythm guitar
- Steve Green - bass, piano
- Doug Grigsby - bass, drum programming, loops, programming, keyboards, rhythm, drums
- Charlene Holloway - background vocals
- Annette Hardeman - background vocals
- Kent Hewitt - piano
- Reginald Hines - rhythm
- Phyllis Hyman - vocals, rap
- Phillip Ingram - background vocals
- Candi James - background vocals
- Josie James - background vocals
- Birch Johnson - trombone
- Mark Johnson - trombone
- Quinton Joseph - drums
- The Kerber Brothers - strings, horn
- Lambchops - synthesizer, piano
- Rhett Lawrence - keyboards
- Manny Lopez - acoustic guitar, guitar
- James Loyd - keyboards
- Karen Manno - background vocals
- Lester Mendez - keyboards
- Eddie Montilla - drums, drum programming
- Myriam Naomi Valle - background vocals
- Gene Page - strings
- Kenny Pollack - percussion, keyboards, drum programming, drums
- Donald Robinson - keyboards
- John "J.R." Robinson - drums
- Jim Salamone - percussion, drums, keyboards
- Joseph Smithers - trumpet
- Bob Suttman - trombone
- T.J. Tindall - guitar
- John Valentino - trumpet, shaker
- Fred Washington - bass
- Walter White - trumpet
- Dee Dee Wilde - background vocals
- Betty Wright - background vocals
- Earl Young - drums
- Jimmy Young - bass

=== Production ===
- Arranger: Terry Burrus, Dave Darlington, Charlie Ernst, Kenny Gamble, Doug Grigsby, Reginald Hines, The Kerber Brothers, Karen Manno, Gene Page, Kenny Pollack, Jonathan Rosen, Dexter Wansel.
- Rhythm Arrangements: Dave Darlington, Charlie Ernst, Doug Grigsby, Kenny Pollack, Reginald Hines, Manny Lopez.
- Vocal Arrangement: Karen Manno.
- String Arrangements: The Kerber Brothers, Gene Page.
- Horn Arrangements: The Kerber Brothers.

== Charts ==
=== Weekly charts ===
Chart (1991)	Peak position
US Billboard 200	117
US Top R&B/Hip-Hop Albums (Billboard)	10

=== Year-end charts ===
Chart (1991)	Position
US Top R&B/Hip-Hop Albums (Billboard)	49
Chart (1992)	Position
US Top R&B/Hip-Hop Albums (Billboard)	36
