= I Refuse to Be Lonely =

Studio album by Phyllis Hyman
- Released: November 21, 1995
- Recorded: 1994–95
- Genre: R&B; soul; vocal jazz
- Label: Zoo Entertainment; Philadelphia International; Volcano
- Producer: Barry J. Eastmond; Dave "Jam" Hall; Dexter Wansel; Jud Friedman; Kenneth Gamble; Leon Huff; Nick Martinelli; Steven Ford

Phyllis Hyman chronology
Prime of My Life (1991)	I Refuse to Be Lonely (1995)	Forever with You (1998)

Singles from I Refuse to Be Lonely
- 1. "I Refuse to Be Lonely" Released: November 1995; 2. "I'm Truly Yours" Released: May 1996

I Refuse to Be Lonely is the ninth studio album by American soul singer-songwriter Phyllis Hyman. It was released posthumously on November 21, 1995 by Philadelphia International Records and Zoo Entertainment, five months after the singer's suicide on June 30, 1995.

== Reviews ==
Professional ratings
Review scores
Source	Rating
AllMusic	4/5 stars
Cash Box	(favorable)
MSN Music Guide	4/5 stars
USA Today	3/4 stars

"Never has an artist produced an entire album that reflects so hauntingly on her life and hints so broadly of her imminent demise as does Phyllis Hyman's "I Refuse To Be Lonely"," wrote Jonathan Takiff in the Chicago Tribune. "Begun at the end of 1993 and completed just days before her death by suicide on June 30, 1995, this goose-bump evoking, emotional roller coaster of a soul-pop ballad album comes off thematically as a life and death struggle, and artistically as one heck of a swan song."

"She was passionate about not singing anything superficial," said song collaborator Gordon Chambers. "In retrospect, a lot of what we wrote were her parting words. It's almost chilling to hear `Why Not Me?' because it really is her testimony."

"Creatively as well as emotionally, "I Refuse To Be Lonely" serves as an ultimate career capper," writes Takiff. "Goaded by producers Nick Martinelli and Kenny Gamble, the set offers this jazz-inflected singer's best-ever vocal performances and strongest creative input, including five songwriting credits and unbilled assists on a lot of others."

== Commercial performance ==
The album reached number 12 on the Billboard R&B albums chart and peaked at number 67 on the Billboard 200.

== Track listing ==
No.	Title	Writer(s)	Producer(s)	Length
1.	"I Refuse to Be Lonely"	Phyllis Hyman; Alan Rich; Nick Martinelli; Jud Friedman	Martinelli; Jud Friedman	4:02
2.	"Waiting for the Last Tear to Fall"	Jon Rosen; Karen Manno; Jeff Franzel	Martinelli	4:13
3.	"This Too Shall Pass"	Lorraine Feather; Joe Curiale	Martinelli	5:29
4.	"I’m Truly Yours"	Kenneth Gamble; James Sigler	Gamble; Steven Ford; Dexter Wansel	5:42
5.	"I’m Calling You"	Hyman; Gamble; Wansel	Wansel	6:02
6.	"Back to Paradise"	Rosen; Manno; Jim Jacobsen	Martinelli	4:52
7.	"It's Not About You (It's About Me)"	Hyman; Dave Hall; Gordon Chambers	Hall	5:17
8.	"It Takes Two"	Hyman; Noel Cohen; Daryl Hair	Martinelli	4:15
9.	"Why Not Me"	Hyman; Chambers; Diane Quander; Barry J. Eastmond	Eastmond	4:43
10.	"Give Me One Good Reason to Stay"	Kenneth Gamble; Leon Huff	Gamble; Wansel; Ford	5:15
Total length:				49:20

== Charts ==
=== Weekly charts ===
Chart (1995)	Peak position
US Billboard 200	67
US Top R&B/Hip-Hop Albums (Billboard)	12

=== Year-end charts ===
Chart (1996)	Position
US Top R&B/Hip-Hop Albums (Billboard)	89
