= Forever with You =

Studio album by Phyllis Hyman
- Released: July 28, 1998
- Recorded: 1985–1995
- Genres: R&B; soul; vocal jazz
- Length: 53:34
- Labels: Philadelphia International Records; Volcano

Phyllis Hyman chronology
I Refuse to Be Lonely (1995)	Forever with You (1998)

Singles from Forever with You
- 1. "Funny How Love Goes" Released: August 1998; 2. "Tell Me What You're Gonna Do" Released: December 1998

Professional ratings
Review scores
Source	Rating
Allmusic	4/5 stars

Forever with You is the tenth and final studio album by American soul singer-songwriter Phyllis Hyman. It was released by Volcano Records on July 28, 1998. The album was released three years after Hyman's suicide and contains twelve previously unreleased songs that were recorded between 1985 and 1995 during her time on the Philadelphia International Records label. The album charted on the Billboard Top R&B Albums chart at No. 66 in 1998.

== Track listing ==
No.	Title	Writer(s)	Producer(s)	Length
1.	"Forever With You"	Kenneth Gamble; Terry Burrus	Gamble; Dexter Wansel	4:21
2.	"Funny How Love Goes" (introducing Damon)	Gamble; Walter Sigler	Gamble; Wansel	4:49
3.	"Come Right or Not at All"	Phyllis Hyman; Jane Eugene; Ian Prince; Angelo Morris; Nick Martinelli	Martinelli	5:21
4.	"The Strength of a Woman"	Hyman; Denise Rich; Sunny Hilden	Wansel; Gary Haase	4:25
5.	"Hurry Up This Way Again"	Wansel; Cynthia Biggs	Wansel	4:23
6.	"How Long"	Hyman; Michael O’Hara	Martinelli; O’Hara	4:19
7.	"Someone to Love"	Michael Masser	Wansel; Gamble	4:04
8.	"Tell Me What You’re Gonna Do"	Hyman; Herb Middleton; Barry Eastmond	Eastmond	4:39
9.	"The Kids"	Gamble; Bruce Hawes	Gamble; Wansel; Hawes	4:41
10.	"Set a Little Trap"	James Sigler	W. Sigler	4:21
11.	"No One But You"	Gamble; Leon Huff	Gamble; Huff; Wansel	4:34
12.	"Souvenirs"	Preston Glass; Alan Glass; Narada Michael Walden; Walter Afanasieff	Wansel	4:28
Total length:				53:34

== Charts ==
Chart (1998)	Peak position
US Top R&B/Hip-Hop Albums (Billboard)	66
