= You Know How to Love Me =

You Know How To Love Me

Studio album by Phyllis Hyman
- Released: October 23, 1979
- Recorded: 1979
- Genres: R&B; soul; disco
- Length: 46:30
- Label: Arista
- Producers: James Mtume, Reggie Lucas

Phyllis Hyman chronology
Somewhere in My Lifetime (1979)	You Know How To Love Me (1979)	Can't We Fall in Love Again? (1981)

Singles from You Know How to Love Me
- 1. "You Know How To Love Me" Released: October 1979; 2. "Under Your Spell" Released: February 1980

You Know How to Love Me is the fourth album by American soul singer-songwriter Phyllis Hyman, released in 1979 by Arista Records.

== Background ==
=== Singles ===
"You Know How to Love Me" and "Under Your Spell" were released as singles from this album.

"You Know How to Love Me" was released in the United States in October 1979. The 7" single contained an edited version of the song with "Give a Little More" on the B-side. A promotional 12" single was also released containing the full-length album version instead. The 7" single was also released in Australia, Brazil, Canada, Italy, Japan, Germany and the United Kingdom with the same content as the U.S. release. The United Kingdom saw a commercial 12" release with the full-length album version.

"Under Your Spell" was released as the second single from the album in the United States, Canada and the United Kingdom. The United States release came in February 1980. An edited version of the song was included on the single, with the album track "Complete Me" being the B-side. There was no 12" release in the United States. In the United Kingdom the song "Kiss You All Over" from Hyman's previous album was used as the B-side instead. The U.K. 12" single included the full-length album version of the song, the 12" extended mix of "Kiss You All Over" and the album track "Hold On".

"You Know How to Love Me" was re-released in the United Kingdom in 1986 to promote the compilation album The Best Of Phyllis Hyman. This re-release had the Goddess of Love album track "We Should Be Lovers" on the B-side, while a single from the same album titled "Riding the Tiger" was an additional bonus cut on the 12" single.

=== Reissues ===
You Know How to Love Me was first released on Compact Disc in Japan on September 22, 1999.

The album's first compact disc release in the United States was in 2002. This release contained a previously unreleased song titled "You're the One", originally recorded in 1977.

The label Funkytowngrooves released an expanded edition of the album in 2015. This release contained 7 bonus tracks. These included the original 7" mixes of "You Know How to Love Me" and "Under Your Spell", the previously released bonus track "You're the One" and various mixes of singles from Hyman's next two albums Can't We Fall in Love Again? and Goddess of Love.

== Reception ==
Professional ratings
Review scores
Source	Rating
AllMusic	4/5 stars
Smash Hits	8/10

Writing in Smash Hits, Bev Hillier described You Know How to Love Me as a "great album" that was "relaxing, pleasant, easy listening and anything similar that you can think of". Hillier went on to describe Hyman's voice as "amazing and perfectly used".

According to the AllMusic review by Jose F. Promis, "The album never truly realized its full potential, but does include the song that would become one of Hyman's signature tunes, "You Know How to Love Me." The song was never a blockbuster hit, but has grown into a classic, covered by artists such as Lisa Stansfield and Robin S".

Billboard praised the album for the subtle and economic arrangements, as well as Hyman's engaging and self-confident vocals that fit with the songs. Billboard named "Under the Spell" one of its recommended soul singles for the week of February 23, 1980.

The album reached number ten on the R&B charts in 1980. Its title track was a club smash, reaching number six on the dance charts, and a Top 20 R&B hit.

== Track listing ==
Side one
No.	Title	Writer(s)	Length
1.	"You Know How to Love Me"	Reggie Lucas; James Mtume	7:37
2.	"Some Way"	Reggie Lucas; James Mtume	5:13
3.	"Under Your Spell"	Reggie Lucas; James Mtume	4:40
4.	"This Feeling Must Be Love"	William Beard	3:48

Side two
No.	Title	Writer(s)	Length
5.	"But I Love You"	Misha Segal; Morgan Ames	3:07
6.	"Heavenly"	Reggie Lucas; James Mtume	4:33
7.	"Hold On"	Hubert Eaves III; Tawatha Agee	4:15
8.	"Give a Little More"	Howard Schneider; Larry Alexander; Phyllis Hyman	4:07
9.	"Complete Me"	Brad Catron	5:26

2002 U.S. CD Bonus track – BMG Heritage 07822 10606-2
No.	Title	Writer(s)	Length
10.	"You're the One"	John Davis	5:24

2015 U.S. CD Expanded edition bonus tracks – Funkytowngrooves FTG-410
No.	Title	Writer(s)	Length
10.	"You Know How to Love Me" (7" version)	Reggie Lucas; James Mtume	3:46
11.	"Under Your Spell" (7" version)	Reggie Lucas; James Mtume	3:30
12.	"You're the One"	John Davis	5:24
13.	"Tonight You and Me" (Disco version)	Bruce Hawes; Peyton Scott	5:22
14.	"You Sure Look Good to Me" (7" version)	Brian Potter; Rick Conedera	3:29
15.	"Riding the Tiger" (7" version)	Narada Michael Walden; Jeffrey Cohen; Dwayne Simmons	4:12
16.	"Riding the Tiger" (Dance version)	Narada Michael Walden; Jeffrey Cohen; Dwayne Simmons	8:43

== Personnel ==
- Phyllis Hyman – lead and backing vocals
- James Mtume – keyboards, percussion, backing vocals
- Reggie Lucas – guitar, backing vocals
- Howard King – drums
- Ed "Tree" Moore – guitar
- Basil Fearrington – bass
- Harry Whitaker, Hubert Eaves III – keyboards
- Ed Walsh – synthesizer programming
- Gary Bartz - saxophone on "Give a Little More" and "Complete Me"
- Gwen Guthrie, Syndi Jordan, Tawatha Agee – backing vocals
- Wade Marcus – string and horn arrangements

Technical

- Larkin Arnold - executive producer
- John Ford - cover photography

== Charts ==
Chart (1979)	Peak position
US Billboard 200	50
US Top R&B/Hip-Hop Albums (Billboard)	10
