= Goddess of Love (album) =

Studio album by Phyllis Hyman
- Released: May 9, 1983
- Recorded: 1982–1983
- Studio: Sigma Sound, Philadelphia, Pennsylvania; Automatt, San Francisco, California
- Genre: R&B; soul; funk
- Length: 40:39
- Label: Arista
- Producer: Thom Bell: Narada Michael Walden (For Perfection Light Productions)

Phyllis Hyman chronology
Can't We Fall in Love Again? (1981)	Goddess of Love (1983)	Living All Alone (1986)

Singles from Goddess of Love
- 1. "Riding the Tiger" Released: May 1983; 2. "Why Did You Turn Me On" Released: September 1983

Professional ratings
Review scores
Source	Rating
AllMusic	3/5 stars

Goddess of Love is the sixth album by American soul singer-songwriter Phyllis Hyman. It was released by Arista Records in 1983.

== Background ==
=== Singles ===
"Riding the Tiger" was released as the album's first single in the United States in May 1983. The 7" single included an edited version of the song on the A-side and an instrumental version on the B-side. The 12" single included an extended "Dance version" instead. "Riding the Tiger" was also released as a single in the United Kingdom and Germany.

"Why Did You Turn Me On" was the second single and was only released in the United States in September 1983. The album track "Let Somebody Love You" was the B-side.

=== Reissues ===
In 2010, the album was released on compact disc for the first time. Reel Music, an imprint of the Sony Music Entertainment company, oversaw this remastered collection and included a bonus dance re-mix of "Riding the Tiger".

== Track listing ==
Side one
No.	Title	Writer(s)	Length
1.	"Riding the Tiger"	Narada Michael Walden, Jeffrey Cohen, Dwayne Simmons	6:20
2.	"Goddess of Love"	Narada Michael Walden, Jeffrey Cohen, David Sancious	5:51
3.	"Why Did You Turn Me On"	Narada Michael Walden, Corrado Rustici, Allee Willis	4:11
4.	"Your Move, My Heart"	George Merrill, Shannon Rubicam	4:40

Side two
No.	Title	Writer(s)	Length
5.	"Let Somebody Love You"	Alan Glass, Preston Glass	4:45
6.	"Falling Star"	Bill Neale, George Merrill, Shannon Rubicam	3:47
7.	"We Should Be Lovers"	Joseph Jefferson, Charles Simmons, Sherman Marshall	3:56
8.	"Just Me and You"	Thom Bell, Joseph Jefferson	4:37
9.	"Just 25 Miles to Anywhere"	Thom Bell, Joseph Jefferson	2:32
Total length:			40:39

2010 U.S. CD edition bonus track – Reel Music A761653
No.	Title	Writer(s)	Length
10.	"Riding The Tiger" (Dance Version)	Narada Michael Walden, Jeffrey Cohen, Dwayne Simmons	8:47
Total length:			49:26

2013 U.K. CD edition bonus tracks – SoulMusic Records 5095
No.	Title	Writer(s)	Length
10.	"Riding The Tiger" (Dance Version)	Narada Michael Walden, Jeffrey Cohen, Dwayne Simmons	8:47
11.	"Riding The Tiger" (Instrumental Version)	Narada Michael Walden, Jeffrey Cohen, Dwayne Simmons	4:17
12.	"Riding The Tiger" (Single Version)	Narada Michael Walden, Jeffrey Cohen, Dwayne Simmons	4:12
Total length:			57:55

== Personnel ==
- Phyllis Hyman – vocals
- David Sancious – keyboards (1–3), additional backing vocals (1)
- Narada Michael Walden – keyboards (1), drums (1–3), additional backing vocals (1)
- Thom Bell – keyboards (4–9), backing vocals (4–9), arrangements and conductor (4–9)
- George Merrill – synthesizers (4–9)
- Corrado Rustici – guitars (1–3)
- Bobby Eli – guitars (4–9)
- Bill Neale – guitars (4–9)
- Randy Jackson – bass guitar (1–3)
- Bob Babbitt – bass guitar (4–9)
- Charles Collins – drums (4–9)
- Sheila Escovedo – percussion (1–3)
- Ed Shea – percussion (4–9)
- Larry Washington – percussion (4–9)
- Vel Selvan – horns (3)
- Wayne Wallace – horns (3)
- Fred Berry – horns (3)
- Don Renaldo and his Horns and Strings – horns and strings (4–9)
- Jim Gilstrap – backing vocals (1–3)
- Preston Glass – backing vocals (1, 2)
- Kelly Kool – backing vocals (1–3)
- Myrna Matthews – backing vocals (1–3)
- Carla Vaughn – backing vocals (1–3)
- Ronnie Lott – additional backing vocals (1)
- Renaldo Nehemiah – additional backing vocals (1)
- The San Francisco 49er Contingency – additional backing vocals (1)
- John Lehman – backing vocals (2, 3)
- Debra Henry – backing vocals (4–9)
- Joseph Jefferson – backing vocals (4–9)

=== Production ===
- Narada Michael Walden – producer (1–3)
- Thom Bell – producer (4–9)
- David Frazer – engineer (1–3)
- Jay Mark – engineer (4–9)
- Jim Gallagher – overdub engineer (4–9)
- John Nowland – second engineer (1–3)
- John Convertino – assistant engineer (4–9)
- Barry Craig – assistant engineer (4–9)
- Scott MacMinn – assistant engineer (4–9)
- Linda Randazzo – assistant engineer (4–9)
- Jimmy Santis – assistant engineer (4–9)
- Michael Tarsia – assistant engineer (4–9)
- Melanie West – assistant engineer (4–9)
- Bill Neale – production coordinator (4–9)
- Donn Davenport – art direction
- Lisa Wolf – design
- Phyllis Cuington – photography
- Sid Mauer – direction, management

== Charts ==
Chart (1983)	Peak position
US Billboard 200	112
US Top R&B/Hip-Hop Albums (Billboard)	20
