= Terry Burrus =

American musician

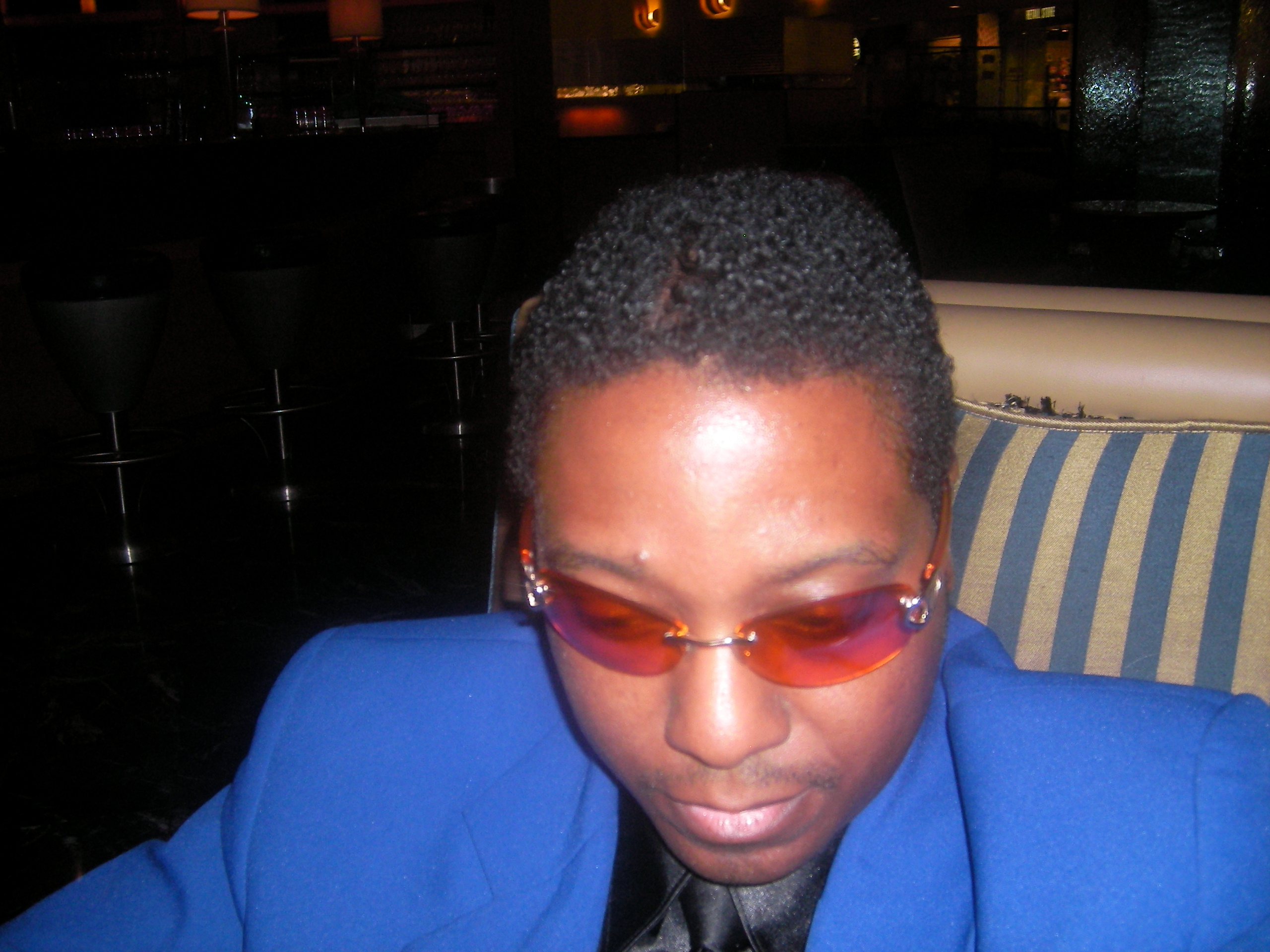
- Terry Burrus

Background information
- Born: Terrance Corley Burrus; January 5, 1961 (age 65); Brooklyn, New York, United States
- Occupations: Musician, record producer, composer
- Instrument: Keyboards
- Label: Ichiban

Terrance Corley Burrus is an American musician, composer, and record producer

He played in Toni Braxton's "Un-Break My Heart" (1996; LaFace)
