= Phyllis Hyman =

American singer-songwriter and actress (1949–1995)

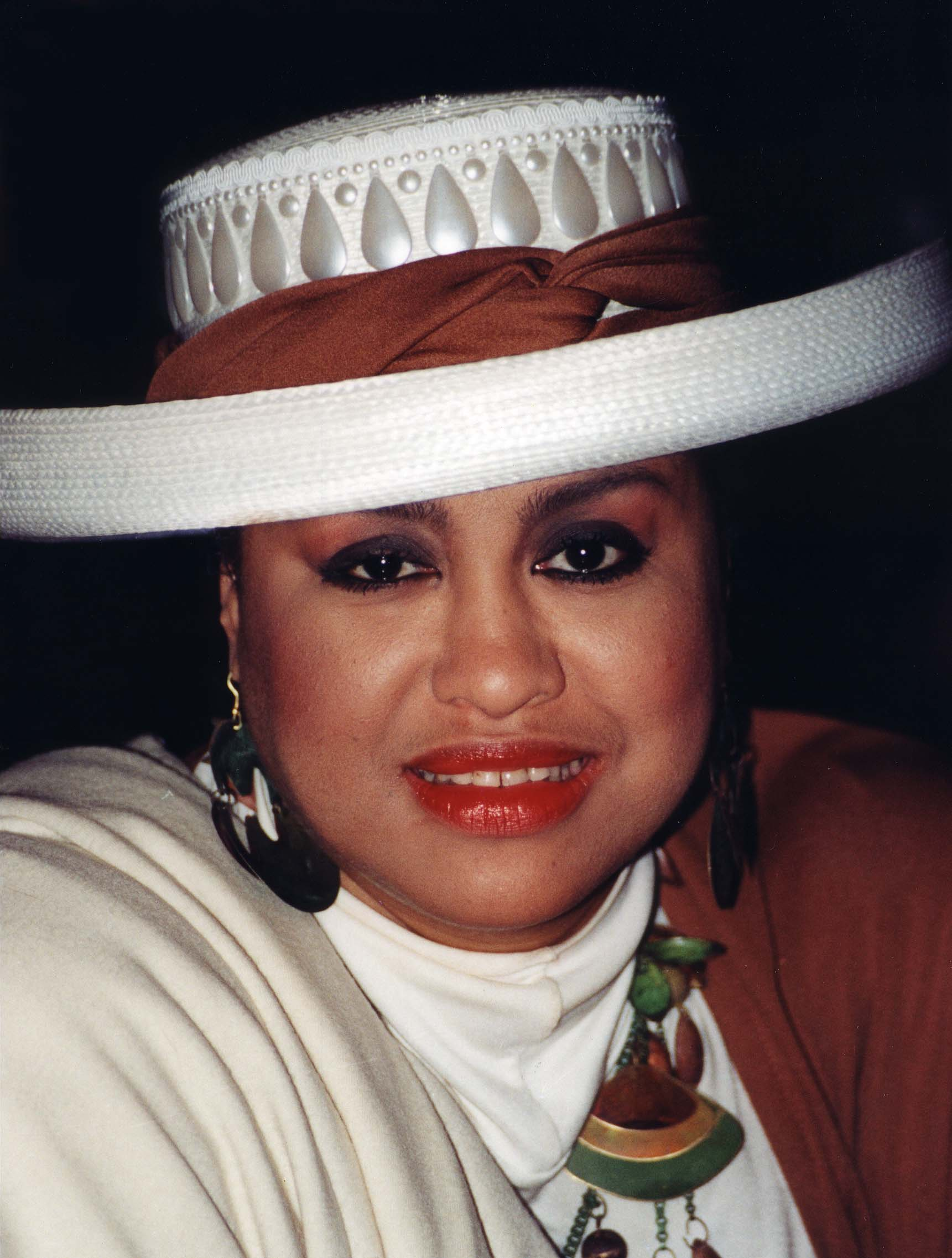
- Hyman in 1994
- Born: Phyllis Linda Hyman; July 6, 1949; Philadelphia, Pennsylvania, U.S.
- Died: June 30, 1995 (aged 45); New York City, US
- Occupations: Singer; songwriter; actress; model
- Years active: 1971–1995
- Spouse: Larry Alexander (m. 1977; div. 1982)
- Relatives: Earle Hyman (cousin)
- Awards: 1981 Theatre World Award for her performance in Sophisticated Ladies
- Musical career
- Genres: R&B; soul; vocal jazz; disco
- Instrument: Vocals
- Labels: Buddah; Arista; Philadelphia Int'l

Phyllis Linda Hyman (July 6, 1949 – June 30, 1995) was an American singer, songwriter, and actress. Hyman's music career spanned the late 1970s through the early 1990s, and she was best known for her expansive contralto range. Some of her most notable songs are "You Know How to Love Me" (1979), "Living All Alone" (1986) and "Don't Wanna Change the World" (1991). Hyman is also known for her covers of popular songs, which include renditions of "Betcha by Golly, Wow", "Here's That Rainy Day", and "What You Won't Do For Love".

Hyman performed on Broadway in the 1981 musical revue Sophisticated Ladies, which ran from 1981 until 1983. The revue, based on the music of Duke Ellington, earned Hyman a Theatre World Award and a Tony Award nomination for Best Performance by a Featured Actress in a Musical.

After an extended struggle with mental health issues, Hyman died by suicide in 1995, aged 45, at her New York City apartment.

== Early life and early career ==
The eldest of seven children, Hyman was born in Philadelphia, Pennsylvania, United States, to Phillip, a World War II veteran, and Louise Hyman, a waitress at a local night club, and grew up in St. Clair Village, the South Hills section of Pittsburgh.

After leaving Pittsburgh, Hyman started her music training at a music school. On graduation, she performed on a national tour with the group, New Direction, in 1971. After the group disbanded, she joined All the People and worked with another local group, The Hondo Beat. She appeared in the film Lenny (1974). She also did a two-year stint leading a band called "Phyllis Hyman and the P/H Factor." In 1975, music industry veteran Sid Maurer, and former Epic Records promoter Fred Frank, discovered and signed her to their Roadshow Records/Desert Moon imprint.

Hyman moved to New York City, where she did background vocals on Jon Lucien's Premonition and worked in clubs. In 1975, when Norman Connors was laying tracks for You Are My Starship (1976), he could not get permission to use singer Jean Carne for the album. He heard about Phyllis Hyman, who was working at a club on the Upper West Side of Manhattan. One night, after a Jon Lucien concert at Carnegie Hall, he saw Hyman perform and offered her a spot as the female vocalist on his fourth album for Buddah Records. After the title song got airplay on jazz radio, You Are My Starship went Gold, catapulting the careers of Hyman, Norman Connors, and Michael Henderson to new heights. R&B radio jumped on board, and Connors and Hyman scored on the R&B chart with a remake of The Stylistics' "Betcha by Golly, Wow".

== Later career ==
Hyman sang with Pharoah Sanders and the Fatback Band while working on her first solo album, Phyllis Hyman, released in 1977 on the Buddah Records label. When Arista Records bought Buddha, she was transferred to that label. Her first album for Arista, Somewhere in My Lifetime, was released in 1978; the title track was produced by then-labelmate Barry Manilow. Her follow-up album, You Know How to Love Me, made the R&B Top 20 and also performed well on the club–dance charts. Around that time, she lent her background vocals to the debut album by The Beck Family, Dancin' on the Ceiling. The group had a hit with "Can't Shake the Feeling".

In the late 1970s, Hyman married her manager Larry Alexander (the brother of Jamaican pianist and melodica player Monty Alexander), but both the personal and professional associations ended in divorce. Around this time, Hyman began using cocaine, for which she developed a lifelong dependency. Hyman's first solo R&B Top-Ten hit came in 1981 with "Can't We Fall in Love Again?", a duet with Michael Henderson. The song was recorded while she was performing in the Broadway musical Sophisticated Ladies, a tribute to Duke Ellington. She performed in the role for almost two years, receiving a Tony Award nomination for Best Supporting Actress in a Musical and winning a Theatre World Award for Best Newcomer. Problems between Hyman and her label, Arista, caused a pause in her recording career. She used the time to appear on movie soundtracks, television commercials and guest vocals, working with Chuck Mangione, The Whispers and The Four Tops. Hyman provided vocals for three tracks on jazz pianist McCoy Tyner's Looking Out (1982). She toured often and did a college lecture tour.

In 1983, Hyman recorded the song "Never Say Never Again" as the title song for the James Bond movie of the same name, written by Stephen Forsyth and Jim Ryan. However, Warner Brothers informed Forsyth that Michel Legrand, who wrote the score for the film, had threatened to sue them, claiming he contractually had the rights to the title song. An alternate title song composed by Legrand was eventually used for the film and performed by singer Lani Hall, formerly of Sérgio Mendes and Brasil '66. Free from Arista in 1985, Hyman released the album Living All Alone on Kenny Gamble and Leon Huff's Philadelphia International label in 1986, capitalizing on the torch songs, "Old Friend" and the melancholy title track, as well as "You Just Don't Know". In 1987, Phyllis Hyman recorded "Black and Blue" as a duet with Barry Manilow on his 1987 Swing Street Arista album. Manilow was a long time admirer of Hyman and her work. Shortly afterward, she appeared in the films School Daze (1988) and The Kill Reflex (1989). She would also continue to lend her voice to albums for other artists and musicians, including Grover Washington, Jr. and Lonnie Liston Smith, while at the same time doing international tours.

Hyman's next album, Prime of My Life, released in 1991, again on Philadelphia International, was the biggest of her career. It included her first number-one R&B hit, as well as her first Billboard Top 100 hit, "Don't Wanna Change the World". The album provided two more top 10 R&B singles in "Living in Confusion" and "When You Get Right Down to It", and the less successful "I Found Love". Just over a year later, she appeared one last time on a Norman Connors album, singing the title song, "Remember Who You Are", which became a minor R&B hit. The album and debut single were both RIAA certified Gold in 1992.

== Death ==
Hyman suffered from bipolar disorder and depression for years, having been diagnosed in the 1980s. She often self-medicated with alcohol and drugs, and frequently spoke about suicide. On the afternoon of June 30, 1995, Hyman died by suicide, overdosing on a mixture of tuinal, a sleeping pill, and vodka in the bedroom of her New York City apartment at 211 West 56th Street. She was found unconscious at 2:00 p.m. (EDT) and died at 3:50 p.m. at St. Luke's-Roosevelt Hospital (now Mount Sinai West), hours before she had been scheduled to perform at the Apollo Theater. Her suicide note read in part:

I'm tired. I'm tired. Those of you that I love know who you are. May God bless you.

Hyman was cremated after an autopsy was performed. A memorial service was held at St. Peter's Lutheran Church in Manhattan.

== Personal life ==
Hyman was married once, to Larry Alexander, who served as her music arranger from 1977 until they divorced in 1982. She had no children.

Hyman was the cousin of actor Earle Hyman, known for his recurring role on The Cosby Show as Cliff's father, Russell Huxtable, and as Panthro on the popular 1980s cartoon Thundercats.

== Posthumous releases ==
In November 1995, five months after her death, Hyman's album I Refuse to Be Lonely was released.

In April 1998, a posthumous compilation album, One on One was released with three of her earliest solo sides and nine collaborations including "Take the 'A' Train" with Gregory Hines, "Maybe Tomorrow" with the Four Tops, and "Betcha by Golly, Wow" with Norman Connors.

Three years after her death, a second posthumous album of previously unreleased material was released. Songs were culled from various recording sessions from the mid-1980s into the early 1990s. Forever with You (1998) contains love songs, torch songs, bitter-sweet ballads, smooth jazz offerings and uptempo tracks, most of which showcase Hyman's' usual interpretation of heartbreak and strife. Hyman was quoted as saying that these songs were about "relationships gone bad!" Much of the material on this album was initially intended for her Living All Alone release. The song "Funny How Love Goes" contains a posthumous "duet" featuring vocalist Damon Williams. Half of Hyman's vocals were re-recorded with both singers alternating vocals and providing Williams with exposure. The UK label Expansion released a jazz-soul orientated compilation in 2003 called In Between the Heartaches, which featured cuts from her collaborations with Norman Connors, McCoy Tyner, Jon Lucien and Pharoah Sanders. It also included five unreleased tracks from her period with Arista records.

In September 2007, an authorized biography was released. Entitled Strength of a Woman: The Phyllis Hyman Story, the book is written by Jason A. Michael in cooperation with the Estate of Phyllis Hyman. The book mentions Hyman's relationships with men and one woman. In 2008, an original version of the James Bond theme "Never Say Never Again", which was not used in the film due to contractual issues, was released by the track's co-writer Stephen Forsythe.

== Awards and nominations ==
Year	Organisation	Category	Work	Result	Ref.
1977	Rock Music Awards	Best New Female Vocalist	Herself	Nominated	
1979	Billboard	Top Overall Female Artists	Herself	No. 40	

== Discography ==
Studio albums

- Phyllis Hyman (1977)
- Sing a Song (1978)
- Somewhere in My Lifetime (1978)
- You Know How to Love Me (1979)
- Can't We Fall in Love Again? (1981)
- Goddess of Love (1983)
- Living All Alone (1986)
- Prime of My Life (1991)
- I Refuse to Be Lonely (1995)
- Forever with You (1998)

== Filmography ==
- Lenny (1974)
- Too Scared to Scream (1985)
- School Daze (1988)
- Soda Cracker (1989)
