= Can't We Fall in Love Again? =

Studio album by Phyllis Hyman
- Released: June 12, 1981
- Studios: Kendun Recorders, Burbank, California; MCA Whitney, Glendale, California; Sigma Sound, New York City
- Genres: R&B; soul; soft rock; pop; dance
- Length: 34:52
- Label: Arista
- Producers: Norman Connors: Chuck Jackson; Maxine Brown

Phyllis Hyman chronology
You Know How to Love Me (1979)	Can't We Fall in Love Again? (1981)	Goddess of Love (1983)

Singles from Can't We Fall in Love Again?
- 1. "Can't We Fall in Love Again?" Released: June 1981; 2. "Tonight You and Me" Released: October 1981; 3. "You Sure Look Good to Me" Released: January 1982

Professional ratings
Review scores
Source	Rating
Allmusic	2/5 stars

Can't We Fall in Love Again? is the fifth album by American soul singer-songwriter Phyllis Hyman. It was released by Arista Records in 1981.

== Background ==
The original album was mainly produced by previous collaborator, Norman Connors, but Chuck Jackson was brought in to mix and complete most of the tracks and to produce the title track, when Connors dropped out.

== Singles ==
=== United States ===
The title track was released as the first single from the album in the United States in June 1981. The single included an edited version of the song with the album track "The Sunshine in My Life" on the B-side.

"Tonight You and Me" was the second U.S. single and was released in October 1981. The 7" release re-used "The Sunshine in My Life" as its B-side. A promotional 12" release included an extended remix of "Tonight You and Me" on the B-side instead.

"You Sure Look Good to Me" was the third and final single in the United States. The single included an edited version of the song on the A-side and the album track "Just Another Face in the Crowd" on the B-side.

=== United Kingdom ===
The United Kingdom had two singles released from the album. The first single was "You Sure Look Good to Me", which entered the U.K. charts in September 1981. Unlike in the United States, the single was released on both 7" and 12" formats in the United Kingdom. The 7" single included "The Sunshine in My Life" on the B-side. Two different 12" singles were released, containing two and three tracks each respectively. The 2-track version included the album version of "You Sure Look Good to Me" on the A-side and the album track "Don't Tell Me, Tell Her" on the B-side. The 3-track version additionally included the album version of "Tonight You and Me".

"Tonight You and Me" was eventually released as the album's second U.K. single in its own right. Like with the previous single it was released on both 7" and 12" formats. The album track "I Ain't Asking" was the B-side. The 12" single included the remixed version of "Tonight You and Me", previously only available as a promotional release in the United States.

=== Other countries ===
"You Sure Look Good to Me" was the most widely released single from the album, being issued in Brazil, France and Japan. "Can't We Fall in Love Again?" was the B-side in Brazil and France, while "Tonight You and Me" was selected as the B-side in Japan.

"Tonight You and Me" and "You Sure Look Good to Me" were released as a double A-side single in Italy.

== Reception ==
Billboard magazine noted Hyman's "very expressive voice" on this album and felt that it should "do just as well" on the charts as her last album You Know How to Love Me. The title track, the "Latin-edged" "Don't Tell Me, Tell Her", "The Sunshine in My Life" and "I Ain't Asking" were selected as the best songs from the album.

Billboard noted the extended version of "Tonight You and Me" on its promotional 12-inch release had "a mid-tempo and soulful beat with a slight break adding a punch at the end", and added that the single was "receiving enthusiastic response from club deejays".

== Track listing ==
Side one
No.	Title	Writer(s)	Length
1.	"You Sure Look Good to Me"	Brian Potter; Rick Conedera	4:20
2.	"Don't Tell Me, Tell Her"	Doug James; Sandy Linzer	4:18
3.	"I Ain't Asking"	Nickolas Ashford; Valerie Simpson	4:02
4.	"Can't We Fall in Love Again?" (Duet with Michael Henderson)	John Lewis Parker; Peter Ivers	5:17

Side two
No.	Title	Writer(s)	Length
5.	"The Love Too Good To Last"	Burt Bacharach; Carole Bayer Sager; Peter Allen	4:06
6.	"Tonight You and Me"	Bruce Hawes; Peyton Scott	3:45
7.	"Sunshine in My Life"	Larry Alexander; Phyllis Hyman	4:27
8.	"Just Another Face in the Crowd"	Dennis Caldirola; Joe Ericksen	5:52

2008 Expanded edition bonus tracks – SoulMusic Records SMDC 03CD
No.	Title	Writer(s)	Length
9.	"Sleep On It" (Recorded 1981)	Andrew Kastner; Larry McNally	3:20
10.	"If You Ever Change Your Mind" (Recorded 1981)	David Batteau; Richard Calhoun; Scott Shelley	2:58
11.	"In Between the Heartaches" (Recorded 1981)	Burt Bacharach; Hal David	3:45
12.	"You're the One" (Recorded 1977)	John Davis	5:23
13.	"I'm Not Asking You to Stay" (Recorded 1982)	Joseph Jefferson; Richard Roebuck	4:22

== Personnel ==
- Phyllis Hyman – vocals, backing vocals (3, 5–7)
- John Barnes – keyboards (1, 3, 4)
- Michael Boddicker – synthesizers (1, 4)
- Sonny Burke – Fender Rhodes (2, 6), keyboards (3, 5, 7, 8), synthesizers (6)
- Bobby Lyle – synthesizers (2, 6), acoustic piano (2, 6), keyboards (3, 8)
- Paul Fox – synthesizer programming (2)
- Tim May – guitars (1, 4)
- Marlo Henderson – guitars (2, 3, 5–8)
- David T. Walker – guitars (2, 3, 5–8)
- Nathan East – bass guitar (1, 3, 4, 6)
- Eddie N. Watkins Jr. – bass guitar (5, 7, 8)
- Leon "Ndugu" Chancler – drums (1, 3–8)
- James Gadson – drums (2, 5, 7, 8)
- Tony Coleman – percussion (1, 4), rhythm arrangements (1, 4), BGV arrangements (1, 2, 4, 8)
- Chuck Jackson – percussion (1, 4), rhythm arrangements (1, 4), BGV arrangements (1, 2, 4, 8)
- Mayra Casales – percussion (2, 3)
- Paulinho da Costa – percussion (2, 3, 6, 8)
- Darryl Munyungo Jackson – percussion (2, 3, 5, 6)
- Eddie "Bongo" Brown – percussion (3)
- Melvin Webb – percussion (5, 7)
- George Bohanon – horns (2, 5–7)
- Davida Johnson – strings (2, 3, 5–7), concertmaster (2, 3, 5–7)
- Gary Bartz – saxophone solo (5, 7)
- Jerry Hey – horn arrangements (1)
- McKinley Jackson – rhythm arrangements (2, 3, 5–7)
- Johnny Pate – horn arrangements (4)
- Paul Riser – arrangements (8)
- Julia Waters – backing vocals (1, 2, 4, 8)
- Maxine Waters – backing vocals (1, 2, 4, 8)
- Oren Waters – backing vocals (1, 2, 4, 8)
- Jean Carn – backing vocals (3, 5–7), BGV arrangements (3, 5–7)
- Krystal Davis – backing vocals (3, 5–7)
- Janet Wright – backing vocals (3, 5–7)
- Michael Henderson – vocals (4)

Additional backing vocals

- Tony Coleman
- James Ingram
- Chuck Jackson
- Nick Johnson
- The Jones Girls
- Cheryl McWhorter

=== Production ===
- Chuck Jackson – producer (1, 2, 4), additional recording (3, 5–8), mixing
- Norman Connors – producer (1–3, 5–8)
- Carla Bandini – recording
- Maxine Brown – recording
- Tony Coleman – mixing, production coordinator
- Steve Hall – recording
- Frank Kejmar – recording, mixing
- Cozy Noda – recording
- Jackson Swartz – recording
- Steve Williams – recording
- Bob Winard – assistant engineer
- Milton Allen – product manager
- Donn Davenport – art direction
- Neal Pozner – album design
- Kevin McDonald – photography
- Tim D'Arcy – stylist
- Roberto Fontanez – clothing design
- Dan Wintrode – hair stylist
- Reggie Wells – make-up
- Charles Ward – management direction
- One West Management – management
- Phyllis Hyman – liner notes

== Charts ==
Chart (1981)	Peak position
US Billboard 200	57
US Top R&B/Hip-Hop Albums (Billboard)	11
