= You Are My Starship =

Studio album by Norman Connors
- Released: 1976
- Recorded: February and March 1976
- Studio: Electric Lady Studios and Sound Ideas Studios, New York City
- Genre: Soul; jazz; jazz fusion
- Length: 35:12
- Label: Buddah Records
- Producer: Jerry Schoenbaum; Skip Drinkwater; Norman Connors; Onaje Allan Gumbs

Norman Connors chronology
Saturday Night Special (1975)	You Are My Starship (1976)	Romantic Journey (1977)

Professional ratings
Review scores
Source	Rating
Allmusic	3/5 stars

You Are My Starship is an album by the Philadelphia, Pennsylvania jazz drummer Norman Connors. Released in 1976 on Buddah Records, it featured bass player/vocalist Michael Henderson and Philadelphia vocalist Phyllis Hyman. The album reached number five on the US R&B chart and number one on the Jazz chart.

The single, "You Are My Starship", charted at number four on the US R&B single chart and 27 on the US Pop chart. The boat on the front cover belonged to actor John Wayne.

== Track listing ==
1. "We Both Need Each Other" (Michael Henderson) 4:07 Lead Vocals – Michael Henderson & Phyllis Hyman
2. "Betcha By Golly Wow" (Linda Creed, Thom Bell) 6:17 Lead Vocals – Phyllis Hyman
3. "Bubbles" (Shunzo Ono) 6:11
4. 'You Are My Starship" (Michael Henderson) 4:23 Lead Vocals – Michael Henderson
5. "Just Imagine" (Onaje Allan Gumbs) 3:58
6. "So Much Love" (Norman Connors) 2:35 Lead Vocals – Norman Connors
7. "The Creator Has a Master Plan (Peace)" (Leon Thomas, Pharoah Sanders) 6:50

== Personnel ==
- Norman Connors - drums, timpani, arrangements, vocals on "So Much Love"
- Michael Henderson - bass, vocals
- Phyllis Hyman - vocals
- Onaje Allan Gumbs - electric piano, string Arp synthesizer
- Ian Underwood - string Arp synthesizer, Mini-Moog synthesizer
- Hubert Eaves III - harpsichord, piano
- Lee Ritenour, Keith Loving- guitar
- Anthony Jackson, Larry McRae - bass
- Tom Scott - melodica
- Don Alias, Neil Clarke - percussion, congas
- Carter Jefferson, Gary Bartz - alto and soprano saxophone
- Earl McIntyre - trombone
- Shunzo Ono - trumpet
- Art Webb - flute
- Doc Kirksey- cello
- Mary Ellen Ewing - viola
- Gayle Dixon Clay, John Blake, Noel Pointer - violin
- Mareatha Stewart, Sharon Redd, Tasha Thomas - backing vocals

== Charts ==
Year	Album	Chart positions		
Year	Album	US	US R&B	Jazz Albums
1976	You Are My Starship	39	5	2

=== Singles ===
Year	Single	Chart positions	
Year	Single	US	US R&B
1976	"We Both Need Each Other"	—	23
1976	"You Are My Starship"	27	4
1976	"Betcha By Golly Wow"	—	29
