= Lester S. Levy Collection of Sheet Music =

The Lester S. Levy Collection of Sheet Music consists of over 29,000 pieces of American popular music spanning the years of 1780 to 1980 and is maintained by Johns Hopkins University as part of Special Collections at the Milton S. Eisenhower Library. The collection was sponsored by the National Endowment for the Humanities.
