= American popular music =

Pop music in the united states

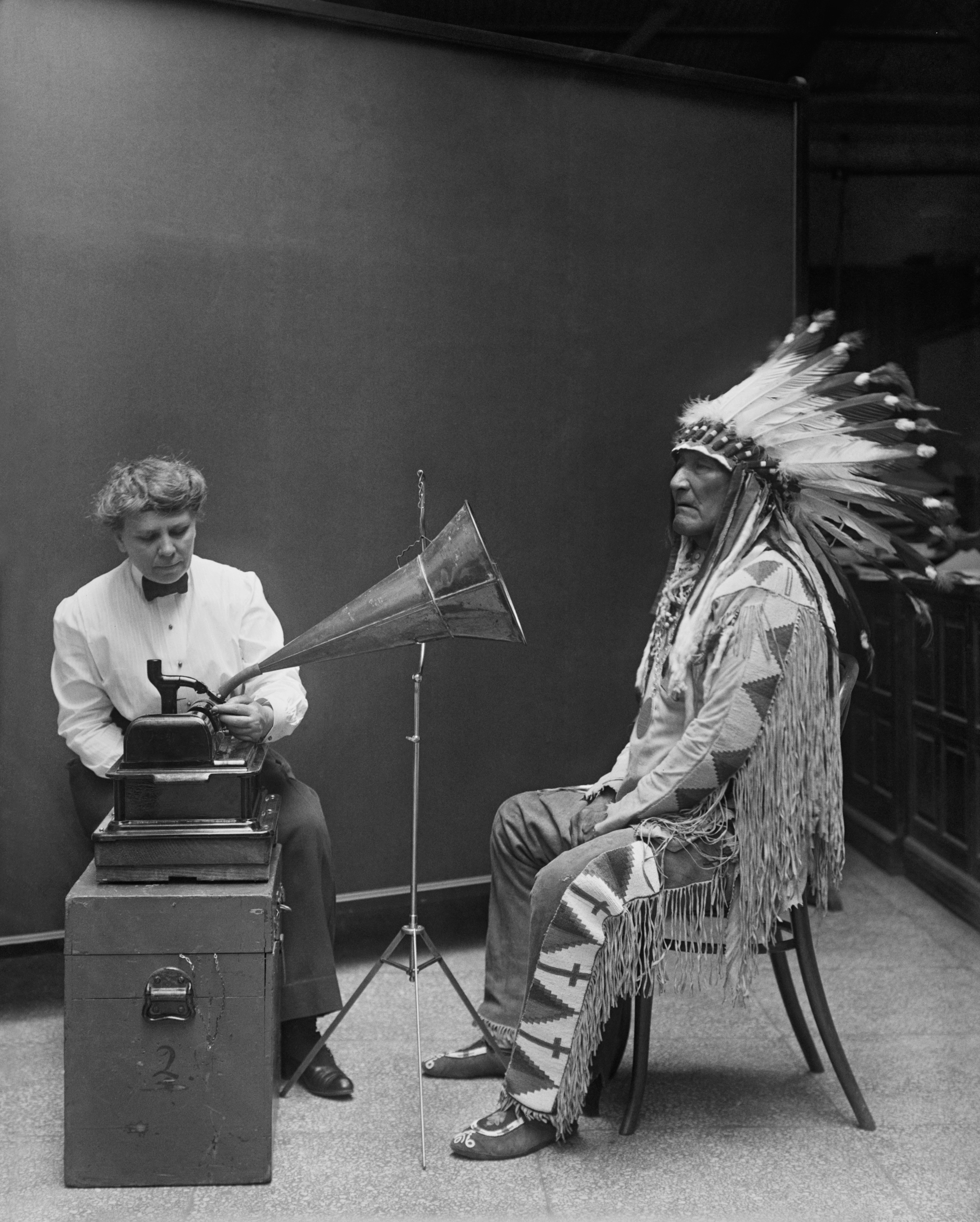
Frances Densmore with Blackfoot chief, Mountain Chief, during a 1916 phonograph recording session for the Bureau of American Ethnology.

American popular music (also referred to as "American Pop") is popular music produced in the United States and is a part of American pop culture. Distinctive styles of American popular music emerged early in the 19th century, and in the 20th century the American music industry developed a series of new forms of music, using elements of blues and other genres. These popular styles included country, R&B, jazz and rock. The 1960s and 1970s saw a number of important changes in American popular music, including the development of a number of new styles, such as heavy metal, punk, soul, and hip hop.

American popular music is incredibly diverse, with styles including ragtime, blues, jazz, swing, rock, bluegrass, country, R&B, doo wop, gospel, soul, funk, pop, punk, disco, house, techno, salsa, grunge and hip hop. In addition, the American music industry is quite diverse, supporting a number of regional styles such as zydeco, klezmer and slack-key. Though these styles were not always in the sense of mainstream, they were commercially recorded and therefore are examples of popular music as opposed to folk or classical music.

American popular musical styles have had a significant influence on global culture.

== Early popular music ==
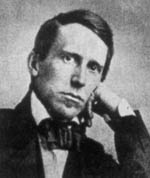
The first major American popular songwriter, Stephen Foster

American folk singer Pete Seeger defined pop music as "professional music which draws upon both folk music and fine arts music". Nineteenth century popular music mostly descended from earlier musical traditions such as theatre music, band music, dance music, and church music. The earliest songs that could be considered American popular music, as opposed to the popular music of a particular region or ethnicity, were sentimental parlor songs by Stephen Foster and his peers, and songs meant for use in minstrel shows, theatrical productions that featured singing, dancing and comic performances. Minstrel shows generally used African instruments and dance, and featured performers with their faces blackened, a technique called blackface. By the middle of the 19th century, touring companies had taken this music not only to every part of the United States, but also to the UK, Western Europe, and even to Africa and Asia. Minstrel shows were generally advertised as though the music of the shows was in an African-American style, though this was often not true. According to the historian of music, Larry Birnbaum, the music in minstrel shows was of mainly European origin, and was based on English, Irish, and Scottish folk music. Similarly the author Richard Carlin states that while minstrel shows used the banjo, an instrument of African origin, and popularized black culture, minstrel music was largely an amalgamation of European dance tunes. Andrew Stott states that many of the songs that initiated the "craze for blackface" were of European origin.

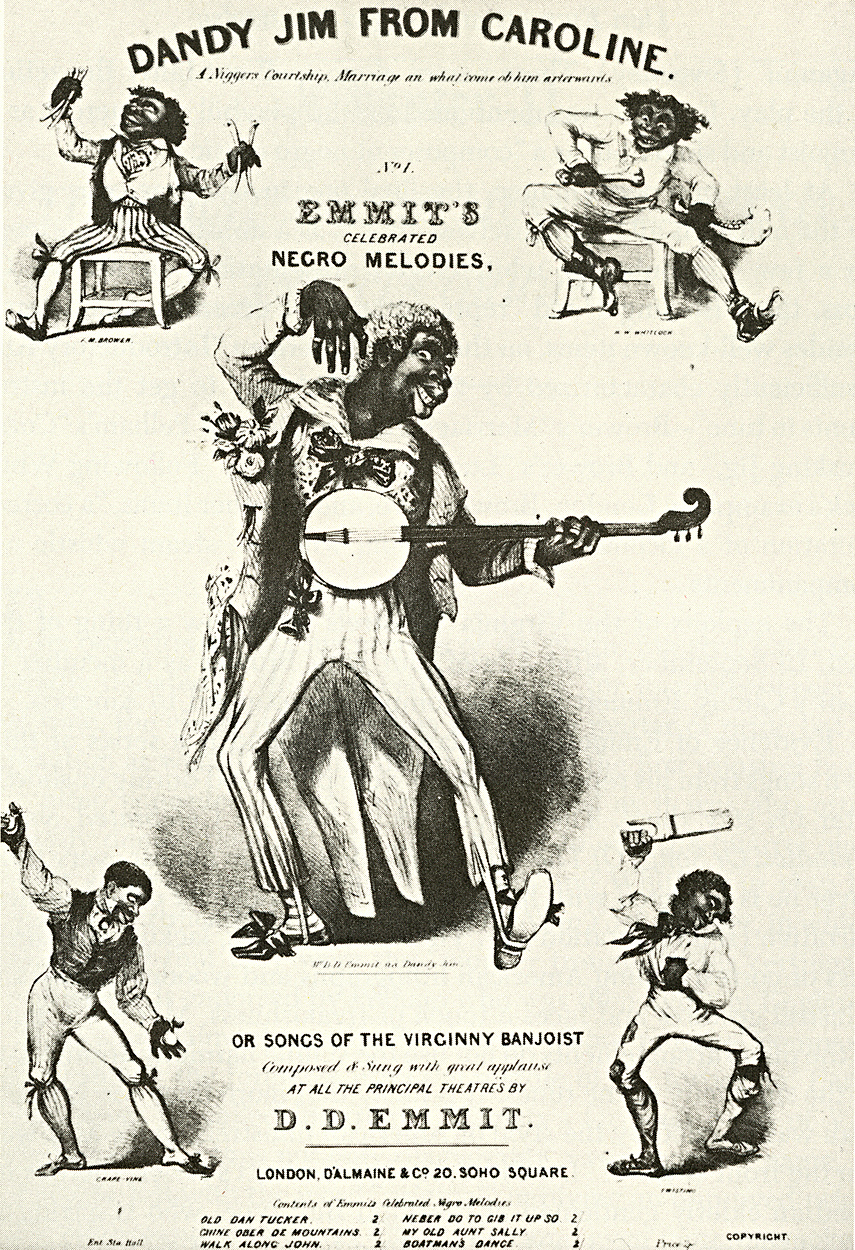
Sheet music cover for "Dandy Jim from Caroline" by Dan Emmett, London, c. 1844.

The first popular music published for private consumption in America came from Ireland in 1808 with Thomas Moore's Irish Melodies, a multi-volume book of mainly Irish folk songs arranged for private performances. Inspired by Moore, John Hill Hewitt became the first American songwriter to compose a style of popular music for private consumption, with his most famous piece "The Minstrels Return from War" becoming an international success. Black people had taken part in American popular culture prior to the Civil War era, at least dating back to the African Grove Theatre in New York in the 1820s and the publication of the first music by a black composer, Francis Johnson, in 1818. Centered in Philadelphia, Johnson also led one of the first professional bands in American history from the 1820s to 1840s. However, these important milestones still occurred entirely within the conventions of European music. Notable popular music in the 1830s and 1840s included publications by Henry Russell and the Hutchinson Family.

The first extremely popular minstrel song was "Jump Jim Crow" by Thomas "Daddy" Rice, which was first performed in 1832 and was a sensation in London when Rice performed it there in 1836. Rice used a dance that he copied from a stable boy with a tune adopted from an Irish jig. Popular white performers of minstrel music included George Washington Dixon and Joel Sweeney whose tunes followed Scottish and Irish melodies. The African elements included the use of the banjo, believed to derive from West African string instruments, and accented and additive rhythms. Beginning in 1843 the Virginia Minstrels became the first group to popularize the minstrel show format, and by 1850 minstrel shows had spread across the entire United States.

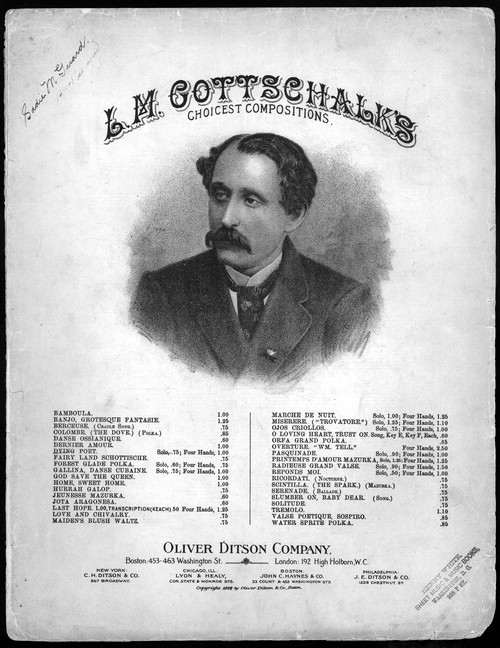
Louis Moreau Gottschalk was a pianist who made significant contributions to music during the mid-19th century.

Many of the songs of the minstrel shows are still remembered today, especially those by Daniel Emmett and Stephen Foster, the latter being, according to David Ewen, "America's first major composer, and one of the world's outstanding writers of songs". Foster's songs were typical of the minstrel era in their unabashed sentimentality, and in their acceptance of slavery. Nevertheless, Foster did more than most songwriters of the period to humanize the blacks he composed about, such as in "Nelly Was a Lady", a plaintive, melancholy song about a black man mourning the loss of his wife. In 1851 Foster's song "Old Folks at Home" would become a runaway national hit.

The minstrel show marked the beginning of a long tradition of African-American music being appropriated for popular audiences, and was the first distinctly American form of music to find international acclaim, in the mid-19th century. As Donald Clarke has noted, minstrel shows contained "essentially black music, while the most successful acts were white, so that songs and dances of black origin were imitated by white performers and then taken up by black performers, who thus to some extent ended up imitating themselves". Clarke attributes the use of blackface to a desire for white Americans to glorify the brutal existence of both free and slave blacks by depicting them as happy and carefree individuals, best suited to plantation life and the performance of simple, joyous songs that easily appealed to white audiences. It was only during the Civil War that white audiences first began to be exposed to genuine African-American music, first with the slave spirituals Go Down, Moses in 1861 and then through spiritual performances by the a capella group, the Fisk Jubilee Singers in 1871. After the Civil War minstrel shows performed by actual black troupes spread through the country and black composers such as James A. Bland had national success in the 1870s with songs such as Carry Me Back to Old Virginny and Oh, Dem Golden Slippers. The post-Civil War period also saw the peak in popularity of professional band music, led by directors such as Patrick Gilmore and John Philip Sousa. Sousa, known for his composition of military marches, achieved great fame in the United States and Europe with the United States Marine Band.

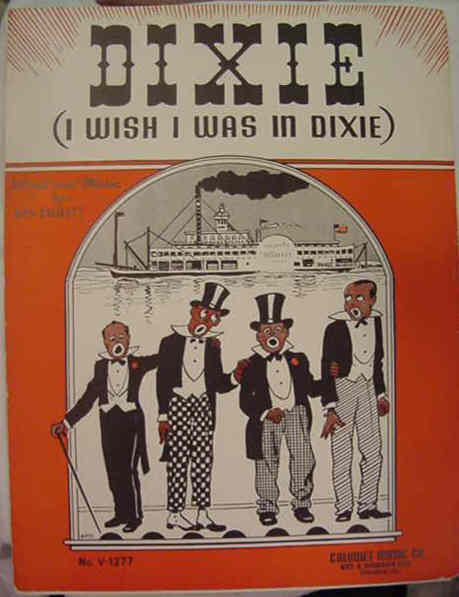
Sheet music for "Dixie"

Blackface minstrel shows remained popular throughout the last part of the 19th century, only gradually dying out near the beginning of the 20th century. During that time, a form of lavish and elaborate theater called the extravaganza arose, beginning with Charles M. Barras' The Black Crook. Extravaganzas were criticized by the newspapers and churches of the day because the shows were considered sexually titillating, with women singing bawdy songs dressed in nearly transparent clothing. David Ewen described this as the beginning of the "long and active careers in sex exploitation" of American musical theater and popular song. Later, extravaganzas took elements of burlesque performances, which were satiric and parodic productions that were very popular at the end of the 19th century.

Like the extravaganza and the burlesque, the variety show was a comic and ribald production, popular from the middle to the end of the 19th century, at which time it had evolved into vaudeville. This form was innovated by producers like Tony Pastor who tried to encourage women and children to attend his shows; they were hesitant because the theater had long been the domain of a rough and disorderly crowd. By the early 20th century, vaudeville was a respected entertainment for women and children, and songwriters like Gus Edwards wrote songs that were popular across the country. The most popular vaudeville shows were, like the Ziegfeld Follies, a series of songs and skits that had a profound effect on the subsequent development of Broadway musical theater and the songs of Tin Pan Alley.

=== Tin Pan Alley ===
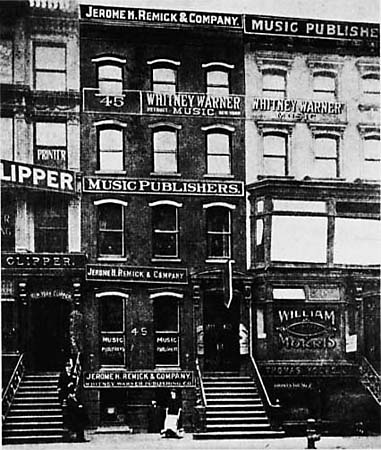
Tin Pan Alley on West 28th Street.

Tin Pan Alley was an area on and surrounding West 28th Street in New York City, which became the major center for music publishing by the mid-1890s. The songwriters of this era wrote formulaic songs, many of them sentimental ballads. During this era, a sense of national consciousness was developing, as the United States became a formidable world power, especially after the Spanish–American War. The increased availability and efficiency of railroads and the postal service helped disseminate ideas, including popular songs.

Some of the most notable publishers of Tin Pan Alley included Willis Woodward, M. Witmark & Sons, Charles K. Harris, and Edward B. Marks and Joseph W. Stern. Stern and Marks were among the more well-known Tin Pan Alley songwriters; they began writing together as amateurs in 1894.

In addition to the popular, mainstream ballads and other clean-cut songs, some Tin Pan Alley publishers focused on rough and risqué. Coon songs were another important part of Tin Pan Alley, derived from the watered-down songs of the minstrel show with the "verve and electricity" brought by the "assimilation of the ragtime rhythm". The first popular coon songs were "The Dandy Coon's Parade" by Joseph P. Skelly in 1880 and "New Coon in Town", introduced in 1883 by J.S. Putnam, and these were followed by a wave of coon shouters like Ernest Hogan and May Irwin. Famous black composers of coon songs included Bert Williams, George W. Johnson and Irving Jones. Additionally the first time the word "rag" appears in sheet music is in reference to the instrumental accompaniment in Ernest Hogan's 1896 song "All Coons Look Alike to Me", showing a connection between the two genres.

=== Broadway ===
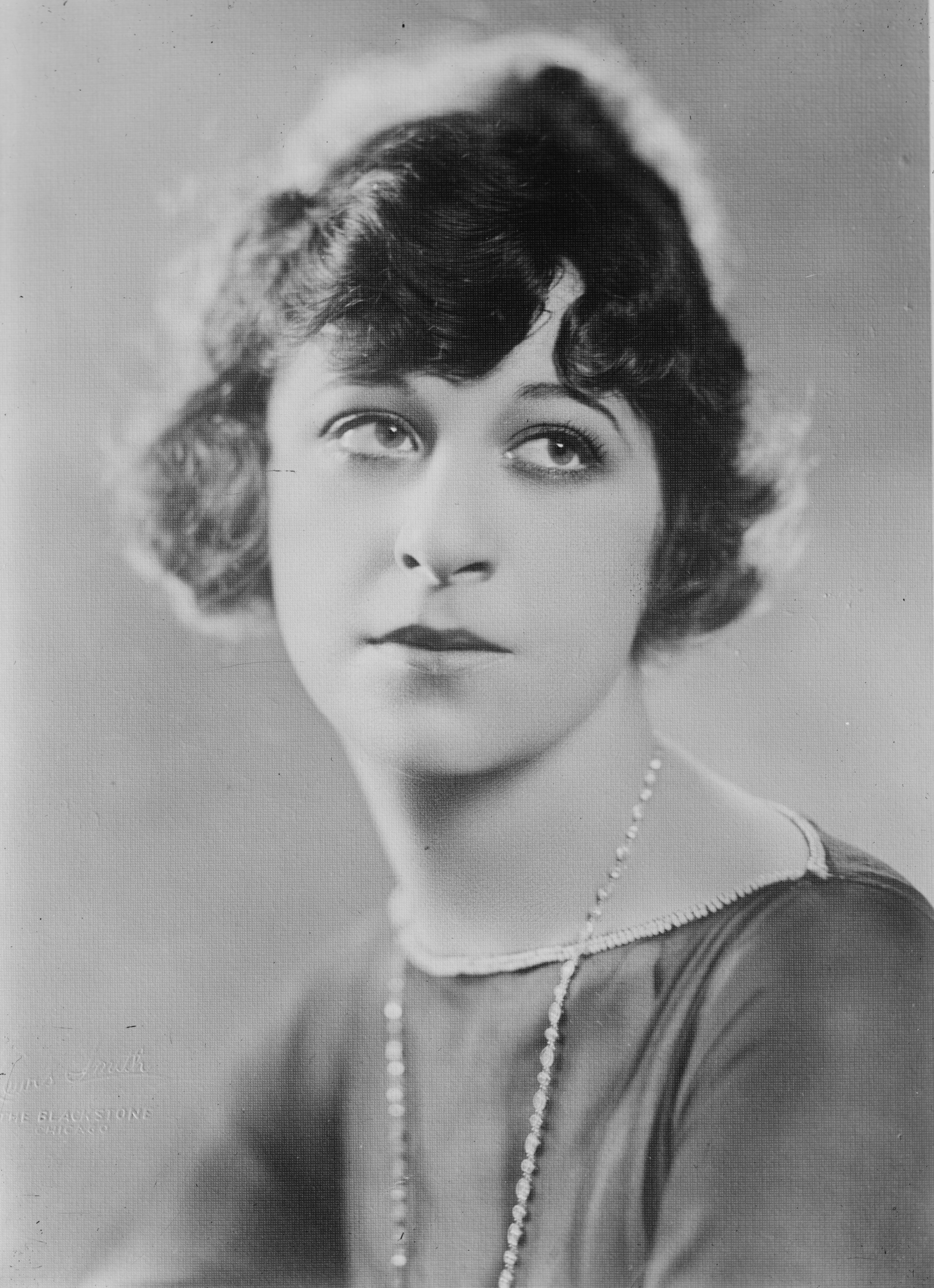
Fanny Brice was a beloved Broadway star known for her comedic talents and expressive singing voice.

The early 20th century also saw the growth of Broadway, a group of theaters specializing in musicals. Broadway became one of the preeminent locations for musical theater in the world, and produced a body of songs that led Donald Clarke to call the era, the golden age of songwriting. The need to adapt enjoyable songs to the constraints of a theater and a plot enabled and encouraged growth in songwriting and the rise of composers like George Gershwin, Vincent Youmans, Irving Berlin and Jerome Kern. These songwriters wrote songs that have remained popular and are today known as the Great American Songbook.

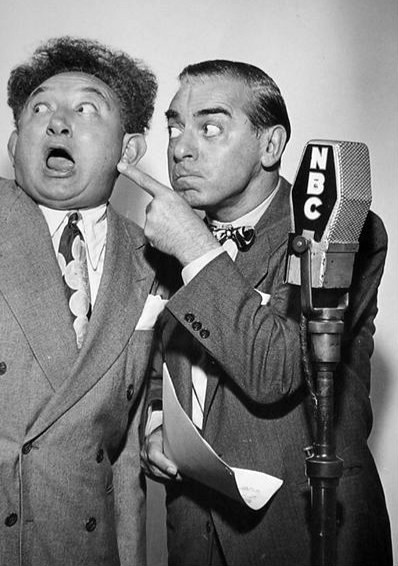
Eddie Cantor (right) with Bert Gordon, AKA "the Mad Russian"

Foreign operas were popular among the upper-class throughout the 19th century, while other styles of musical theater included operettas, ballad operas and the opera pouffe. The English operettas of Gilbert and Sullivan were particularly popular, while American compositions had trouble finding an audience. George M. Cohan was the first notable American composer of musical theater, and the first to move away from the operetta, and is also notable for using the language of the vernacular in his work. By the beginning of the 20th century, however, black playwrights, composers and musicians were having a profound effect on musical theater, beginning with the works of Will Marion Cook, James Reese Europe and James P. Johnson; the first major hit black musical was Shuffle Along in 1921.

Imported operettas and domestic productions by both whites like Cohan and blacks like Cook, Europe and Johnson all had a formative influence on Broadway. Composers like Gershwin, Porter and Kern made comedic musical theater into a national pastime, with a feel that was distinctly American and not dependent on European models. Most of these individuals were Jewish, with Cole Porter the only major exception; they were the descendants of 19th century immigrants fleeing persecution in the Russian Empire, settled most influentially in various neighborhoods in New York City. Many of the early musicals were influenced by black music, showing elements of early jazz, such as In Dahomey; the Jewish composers of these works may have seen connections between the traditional African-American blue notes and their own folk Jewish music.

Broadway songs were recorded around the turn of the century, but did not become widely popular outside their theatrical context until much later. Jerome Kern's "They Didn't Believe Me" was an early song that became popular nationwide. Kern's later innovations included a more believable plot than the rather shapeless stories built around songs of earlier works, beginning with Show Boat in 1927. George Gershwin was perhaps the most influential composer on Broadway, beginning with "Swanee" in 1919 and later works for jazz bands and orchestras. His most enduring composition may be the opera Porgy and Bess, a story about two blacks, which Gershwin intended as a sort of "folk opera", a creation of a new style of American musical theater based on American idioms.

=== Ragtime ===
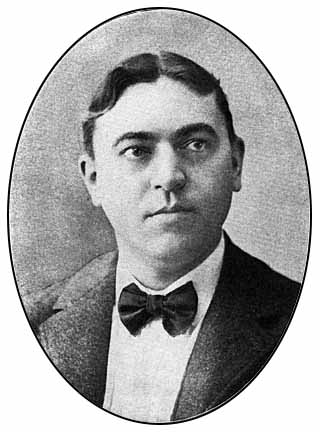
Arthur Collins regarded in his day as "King of the Ragtime Singers".

Ragtime was a style of dance music based around the piano, using syncopated rhythms and chromaticisms; the genre's most well-known performer and composer was undoubtedly Scott Joplin. Donald Clarke considers ragtime the culmination of coon songs, used first in minstrel shows and then vaudeville, and the result of the rhythms of minstrelsy percolating into the mainstream; he also suggests that ragtime's distinctive sound may have come from an attempt to imitate the African-American banjo using the keyboard. According to musical historian, Elijah Wald, ragtime constitutes the first true pop genre in America, as earlier American music such as minstrel show music was distinguished by its association with blackface and comedy, rather than by having any unique style or sound.

Due to the essentially African-American nature of ragtime, it is most commonly considered the first style of American popular music to be truly black music; ragtime brought syncopation and a more authentic black sound to popular music. Popular ragtime songs were notated and sold as sheet music, but the general style was played more informally across the nation; these amateur performers played a more free-flowing form of ragtime that eventually became a major formative influence on jazz.

== Early recorded popular music ==
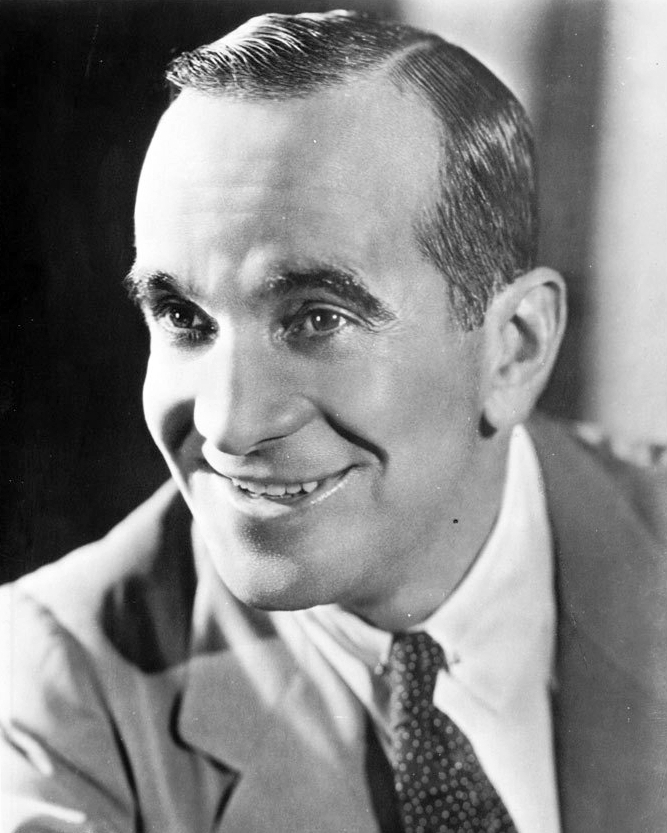
Al Jolson was a highly influential figure in both vaudeville and early sound films.

Thomas Edison's invention of the phonograph cylinder kicked off the birth of recorded music. The first cylinder to be released was "Semper Fidelis" by the U.S. Marine Band. At first, cylinders were released sparingly, but as their sales grew more profitable, distribution increased. These early recorded songs were a mix of vaudeville, barbershop quartets, marches, opera, novelty songs, and other popular tunes. Many popular standards, such as "The Good Old Summertime", "Shine On Harvest Moon", and "Over There" come from this time. There were also a few early hits in the field of jazz, beginning with the Original Dixieland Jazz Band's 1917 recordings, followed by King Oliver's Creole Jazz Band, who played in a more authentic New Orleans jazz style.

Blues had been around a long time before it became a part of the first explosion of recorded popular music in American history. This came in the 1920s, when classic female blues singers like Ma Rainey, Bessie Smith and Mamie Smith grew very popular; the first hit of this field was Mamie Smith's "Crazy Blues". These urban blues singers changed the idea of popular music from being simple songs that could be easily performed by anyone to works primarily associated with an individual singer. Performers like Sophie Tucker, known for "Some of These Days", became closely associated with their hits, making their individualized interpretations just as important as the song itself.

At the same time, record companies such as Paramount Records and OKeh Records launched the field of race music, which was mostly blues targeted at African-American audiences. The most famous of these acts went on to inspire much of the later popular development of the blues and blues-derived genres, including Charley Patton, Lonnie Johnson and Robert Johnson.

=== Popular jazz (1920–1935) and swing (1935–1947) ===
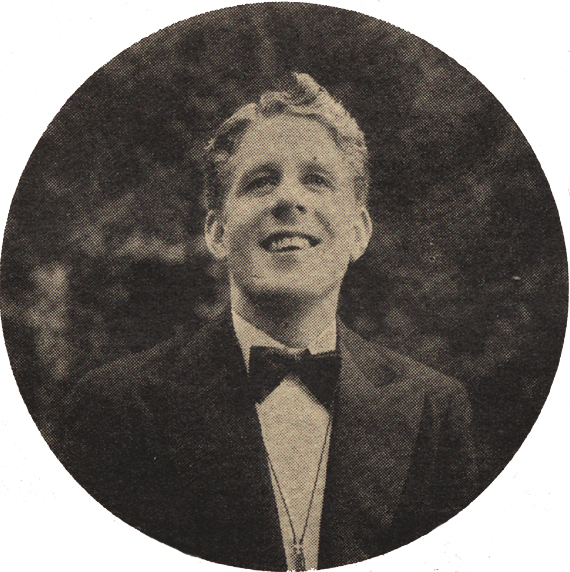
Jazz artist Rudy Vallée. An American singer, actor, and bandleader who rose to fame in the 1920s and 1930s.

Jazz is a kind of music characterized by blue notes, syncopation, swing, call and response, polyrhythms, and improvisation. Though originally a kind of dance music, jazz has now been "long considered a kind of popular or vernacular music (and has also) become a sophisticated art form that has interacted in significant ways with the music of the concert hall". Jazz's development occurred at around the same time as modern ragtime, blues, gospel and country music, all of which can be seen as part of a continuum with no clear demarcation between them; jazz specifically was most closely related to ragtime, with which it could be distinguished by the use of more intricate rhythmic improvisation, often placing notes far from the implied beat. The earliest jazz bands adopted much of the vocabulary of the blues, including bent and blue notes and instrumental "growls" and smears. Jazz artist Rudy Vallée became what was perhaps the first complete example of the 20th century mass media pop star. Vallée became the most prominent and, arguably, the first of a new style of popular singer, the crooner.

Paul Whiteman was the most popular bandleader of the 1920s, and claimed for himself the title "The King of Jazz." Despite his hiring many of the other best white jazz musicians of the era, later generations of jazz lovers have often judged Whiteman's music to have little to do with real jazz. Nonetheless, his notion of combining jazz with elaborate orchestrations has been returned to repeatedly by composers and arrangers of later decades.

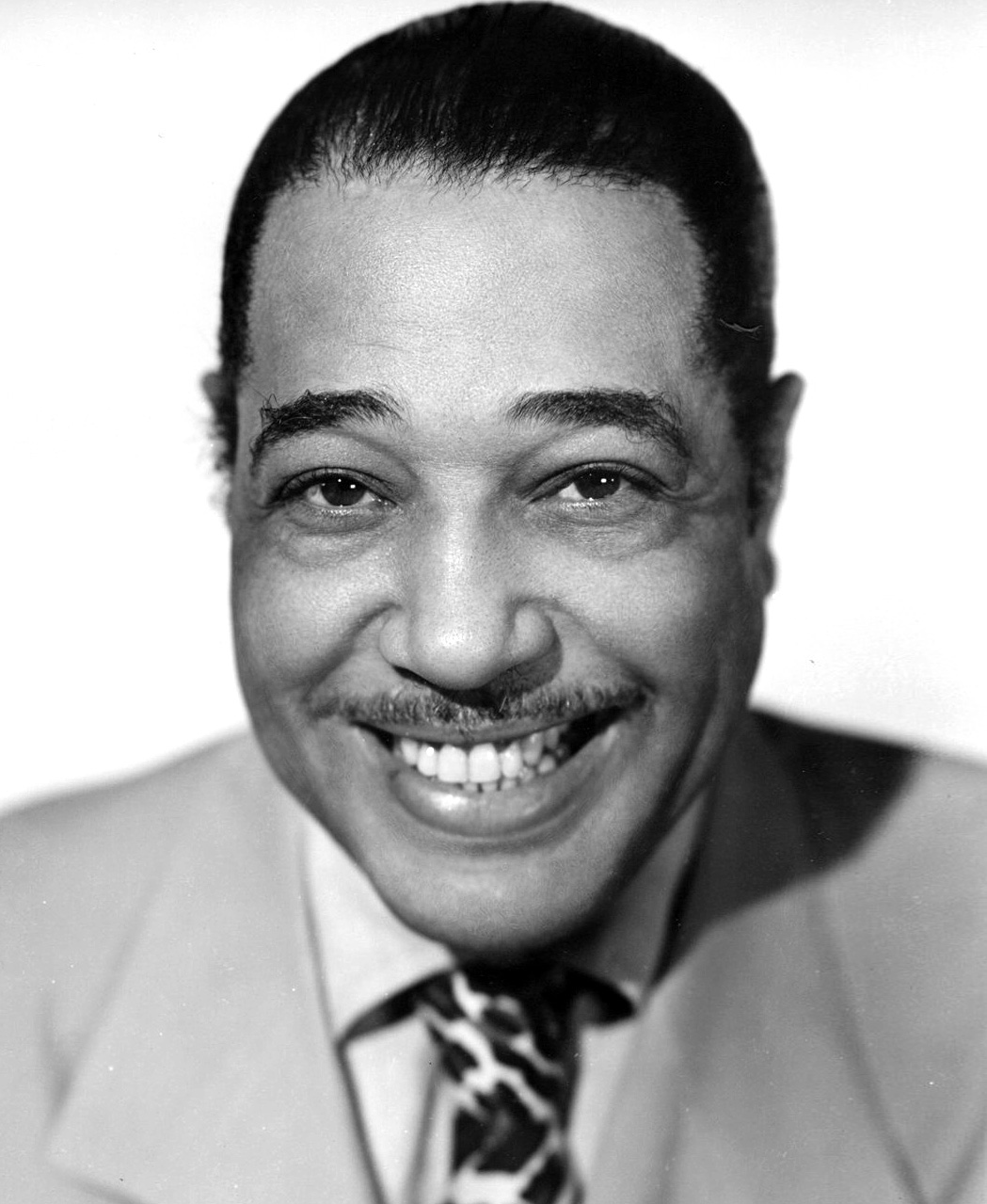
Duke Ellington was a prolific composer, bandleader, and pianist who helped shape the sound of jazz during the 1920s and 1930s.

Whiteman commissioned Gershwin's "Rhapsody in Blue", which was debuted by Whiteman's Orchestra. Ted Lewis's band was second only to the Paul Whiteman in popularity during the 1920s, and arguably played more real jazz with less pretension than Whiteman, especially in his recordings of the late 1920s. Some of the other "jazz" bands of the decade included those of: Harry Reser, Leo Reisman, Abe Lyman, Nat Shilkret, George Olsen, Ben Bernie, Bob Haring, Ben Selvin, Earl Burtnett, Gus Arnheim, Rudy Vallee, Jean Goldkette, Isham Jones, Roger Wolfe Kahn, Sam Lanin, Vincent Lopez, Ben Pollack and Fred Waring.

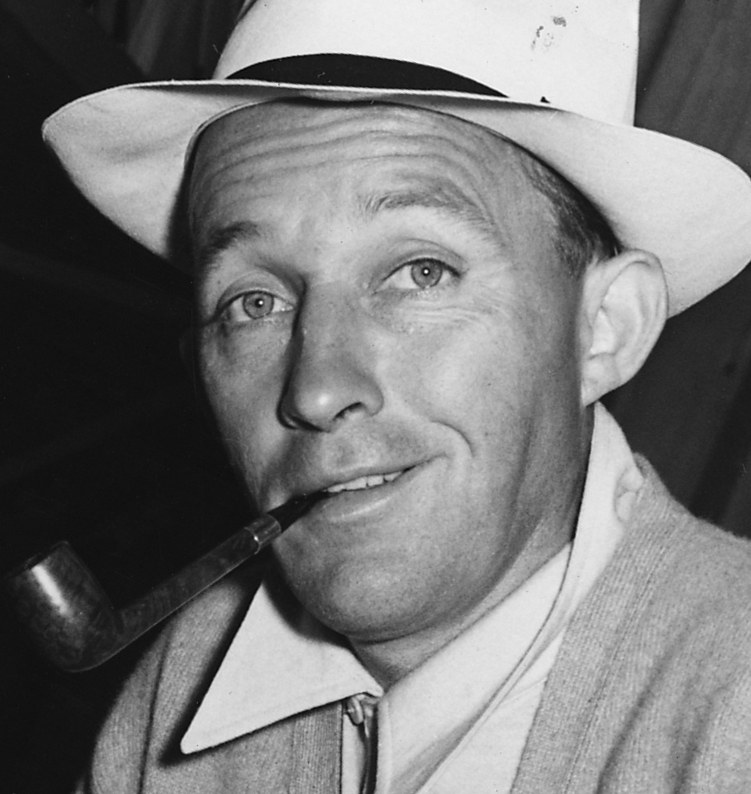
Bing Crosby is best known for his smooth baritone voice, relaxed singing style, and numerous hit recordings.

In the 1920s, the music performed by these artists was extremely popular with the public and was typically labeled as jazz. Today, however, this music is disparaged and labeled as "sweet music" by jazz purists. The music that people consider today as "jazz" tended to be played by minorities. In the 1920s and early 1930s, however, the majority of people listened to what we would call today "sweet music" and hardcore jazz was categorized as "hot music" or "race music."

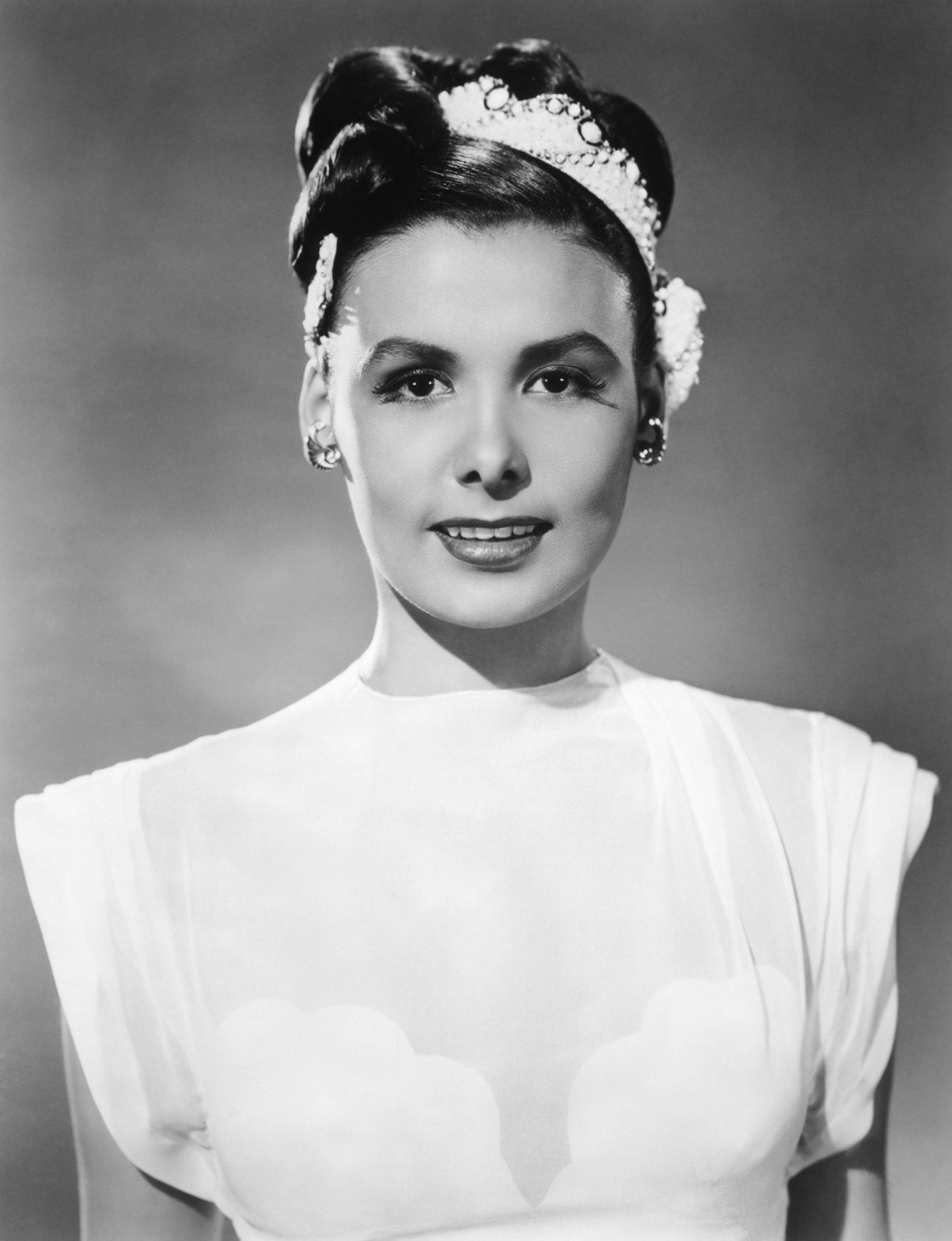
Lena Horne, with her captivating beauty and distinctive voice, became a popular singer and actress during the Swing era.

The largest and most influential recording label of the time, The Victor Talking Machine (RCA Victor after 1928) was a restraining influence on the development of "sweet jazz" until the departure of Eddie King in October 1926. King was well known as an authoritarian who would not permit drinking on the job or severe departure from the written music, unless within solos acceptable by popular music standards of the time. This irritated many Victor jazz artists, including famed trumpeter Bix Beiderbecke. Sudhalter, in Lost Chords, cites an example of a 1927 recording by the Goldkette Orchestra in which musicians were allowed considerable freedom, and remarks "What, one wonders, would this performance have been if Eddie King had been in charge, and not the more liberal Nat Shilkret. Since the Victor ledgers show no less than five recording sessions in January and February 1926, when King actually conducted Goldkette's Orchestra, comparison between the approach of Goldkette and King is readily available.

An early genre of American pop music was the swing craze, a popular dance style in the early part of the 20th century. In 1935, swing music became popular with the public and quickly replaced jazz as the most popular type of music (although there was some resistance to it at first). Swing music is characterized by a strong rhythm section, usually consisting of a double bass and drums, playing in a medium to fast tempo, and rhythmic devices such as the swung note. Swing is primarily a kind of 1930s jazz fused with elements of the blues and the pop sensibility of Tin Pan Alley. Swing used bigger bands than other kinds of jazz had and was headed by bandleaders that tightly arranged the material, discouraging the improvisation that had been an integral part of jazz. David Clarke called swing the first "jazz-oriented style (to be) at the center of popular music ... as opposed to merely giving it backbone". By the end of the 1930s, vocalists became more and more prominent, eventually taking center stage following the American Federation of Musicians strike, which made recording with a large band prohibitively expensive. Swing came to be accompanied by a popular dance called the swing dance, which was very popular across the United States, among both white and black audiences, especially youth.

=== Blues diversification and popularization ===
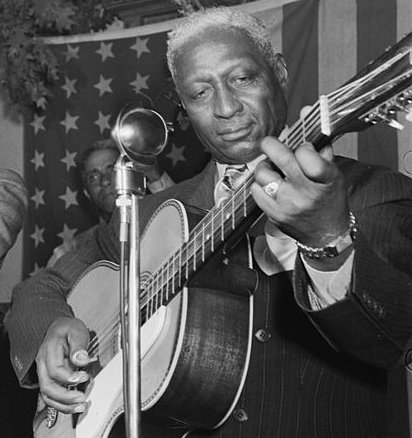
Lead Belly, also known as Huddie William Ledbetter, was a prolific blues musician whose career spanned several decades.

In addition to the popular jazz and swing music listened to by mainstream America, there were a number of other genres that were popular among certain groups of people—e.g., minorities or rural audiences. Beginning in the 1920s and accelerating greatly in the 1940s, the blues began rapidly diversifying into a broad spectrum of new styles. These included an uptempo, energetic style called rhythm and blues (R&B), a merger of blues and Anglo-Celtic song called country music and the fusion of hymns and spirituals with blues structures called gospel music. Later than these other styles, in the 1940s, a blues, R&B and country fusion eventually called rock and roll developed, eventually coming to dominate American popular music by the beginning of the 1960s.

Country music is primarily a fusion of African-American blues and spirituals with Appalachian folk music, adapted for pop audiences and popularized beginning in the 1920s. Of particular importance was Irish and Scottish tunes, dance music, balladry and vocal styles, as well as Native American, Spanish, German, French and Mexican music. The instrumentation of early country revolved around the European-derived fiddle and the African-derived banjo, with the guitar added later. Country music instrumentation used African elements including a call-and-response format, improvised music and syncopated rhythms. Later still, string instruments such as the ukulele and steel guitar became commonplace due to the popularity of Hawaiian music in the early 20th century and the influence of musicians such as Sol Hoʻopiʻi and Lani McIntyre. The roots of modern country music are generally traced to 1927, when music talent scout Ralph Peer recorded Jimmie Rodgers and The Carter Family. Their recordings are considered the foundation for modern country music. There had been popular music prior to 1927 that could be considered country, but, as Ace Collins points out, these recordings had "only marginal and very inconsistent" effects on the national music markets, and were only superficially similar to what was then known as hillbilly music. In addition to Rodgers and the Carters, a musician named Bob Wills was an influential early performer known for a style called Western swing, which was very popular in the 1920s and 30s, and was responsible for bringing a prominent jazz influence to country music.

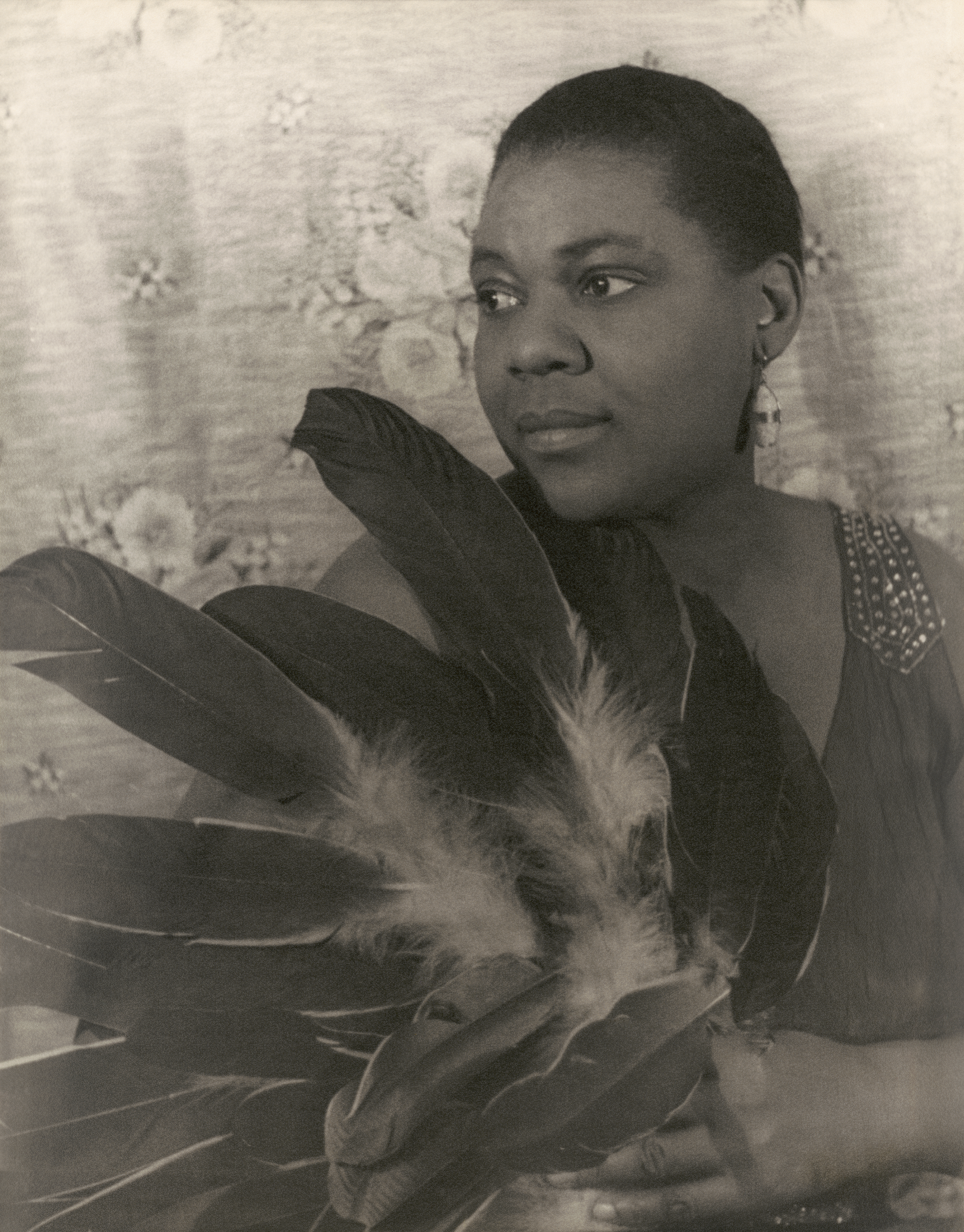
Bessie Smith remained a powerful presence in the blues scene in the early 1940s after her tragic death in 1937.

Rhythm and blues (R&B) is a style that arose in the 1930s and 1940s, a rhythmic and uptempo form of blues with more complex instrumentation. Author Amiri Baraka described early R&B as "huge rhythm units smashing away behind screaming blues singers (who) had to shout to be heard above the clanging and strumming of the various electrified instruments and the churning rhythm sections.. R&B was recorded during this period, but not extensively, and it was not widely promoted by record companies that felt it was not suited for most audiences, especially middle-class whites, because of the suggestive lyrics and driving rhythms. Bandleaders like Louis Jordan innovated the sound of early R&B. Jordan's band featured a small horn section and prominent rhythm instrumentation and used songs with bluesy lyrical themes. By the end of the 1940s, he had produced nineteen major hits, and helped pave the way for contemporaries including Wynonie Harris, John Lee Hooker and Roy Milton.

Christian spirituals and rural blues music were the origin of what is now known as gospel music. Beginning in about the 1920s, African-American churches featured early gospel in the form of worshipers proclaiming their religious devotion (testifying) in an improvised, often musical manner. Modern gospel began with the work of composers, most importantly Thomas A. Dorsey, who "(composed) songs based on familiar spirituals and hymns, fused to blues and jazz rhythms". From these early 20th-century churches, gospel music spread across the country. It remained associated almost entirely with African-American churches, and usually featured a choir along with one or more virtuoso soloists.

Rock and roll is a kind of popular music, developed primarily out of country, blues and R&B. Easily the single most popular style of music worldwide, rock's exact origins and early development have been hotly debated. Music historian Robert Palmer has noted that the style's influences are quite diverse, and include the Afro-Caribbean "Bo Diddley beat", elements of "big band swing" and Latin music like the Cuban son and "Mexican rhythms". Another author, George Lipsitz claims that rock arose in America's urban areas, where there formed a "polyglot, working-class culture (where the) social meanings previously conveyed in isolation by blues, country, polka, zydeco and Latin music found new expression as they blended in an urban environment".

== 1950s and 1960s ==
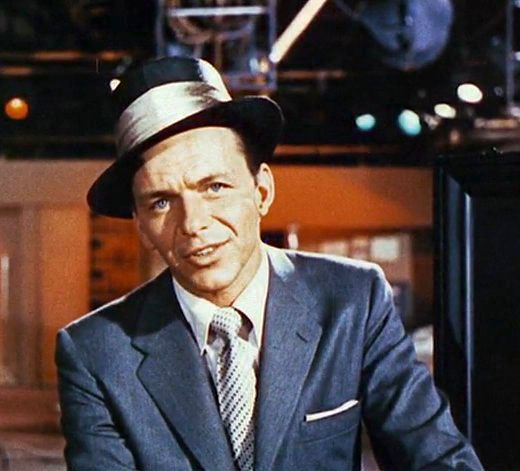
Frank Sinatra in the trailer for Pal Joey (1957).

The middle of the 20th century saw a number of very important changes in American popular music. The field of pop music developed tremendously during this period, as the increasingly low price of recorded music stimulated demand and greater profits for the record industry. As a result, music marketing became more and more prominent, resulting in a number of mainstream pop stars whose popularity was previously unheard of. Many of the first such stars were Italian-American crooners like Dean Martin, Rudy Vallee, Tony Bennett, Perry Como, Frankie Laine and, most famously, the "first pop vocalist to engender hysteria among his fans" Frank Sinatra. One of the most successful crooners was Bing Crosby. Crosby cited popular singer Al Jolson as one of his main influences. Crosby was in turn cited by Perry Como. Crosby also influenced this singing of Frank Sinatra, Crosby and Sinatra sung together in the 1956 film High Society.

As the easy listening craze of the 1950s became a dominant form of pop music on national radio networks, its musical content also evolved. From its humble beginnings in the older songs first found in "your parent's music", easy listening subsequently included hit ballads, instrumentals and show tunes which were performed by a wide array of non-rock artists. Included among them were the vocalists: Doris Day, Rosemary Clooney, Nat King Cole, Vic Damone, Sammy Davis Jr., Billie Holiday, Patti Page, Johnnie Ray, Mel Torme, Jo Stafford, and Sarah Vaughn. Composers and arrangers were also soon inspired to showcase the new genre within the lush orchestral scores featured on their albums. Included among them were Xavier Cugat, Jackie Gleason, Andre Kostelanetz, Guy Lombardo, Mantovani and John Serry.

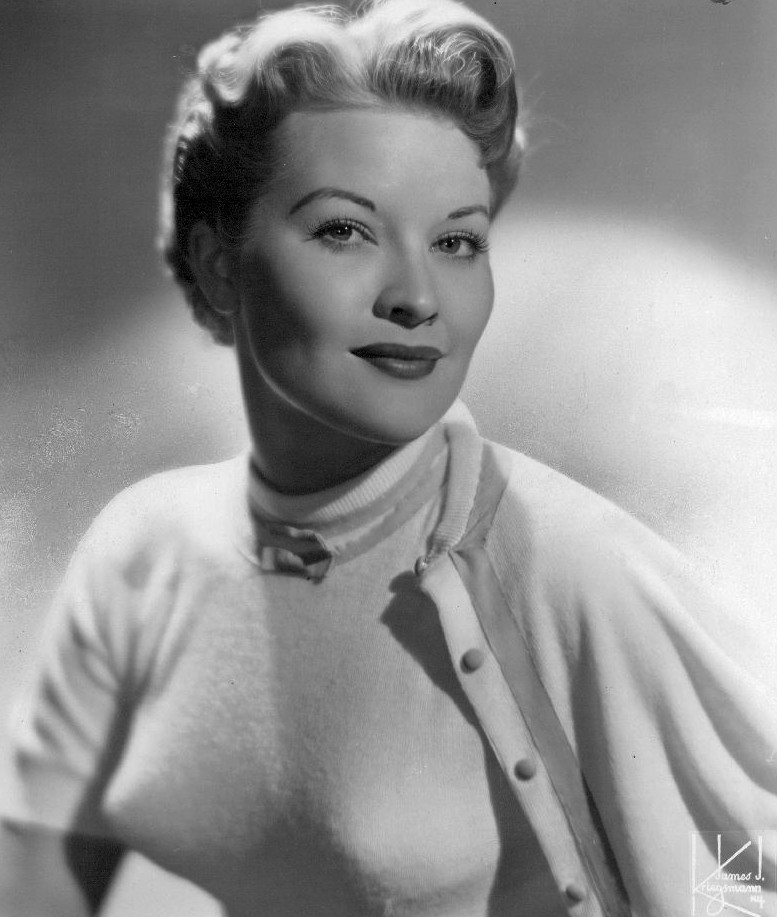
Patti Page was one of the best-selling female artists of the 1950s, known for her smooth vocals and versatile singing style.

The era of the modern teen pop star, however, began in the 1960s. American pop musical examples from the 1960s include The Monkees. Bubblegum pop groups like The Monkees were chosen entirely for their appearance and ability to sell records, with less regard to musical ability. The same period, however, also saw the rise of new forms of pop music that achieved a more permanent presence in the field of American popular music, including rock, soul and pop-folk. By the end of the 1960s, two developments had completely changed popular music: the birth of a counterculture, which explicitly opposed mainstream music, often in tandem with political and social activism, and the shift from professional composers to performers who were both singers and songwriters.

Rock and roll first entered mainstream popular music through a style called rockabilly, which fused the nascent rock sound with elements of country music. Black-performed rock and roll previously had limited mainstream success, and some observers at the time believed that a white performer who could credibly sing in an R&B and country style would be a success. Sam Phillips, of Memphis, Tennessee's Sun Records, found such a performer in Elvis Presley, who became one of the best-selling musicians in history, and brought rock and roll to audiences across the world. Presley's success was preceded by Bill Haley, a white performer whose "Rock Around the Clock" is sometimes pointed to as the start of the rock era. However, Haley's music was "more arranged" and "more calculated" than the "looser rhythms" of rockabilly, which also, unlike Haley, did not use saxophones or chorus singing.

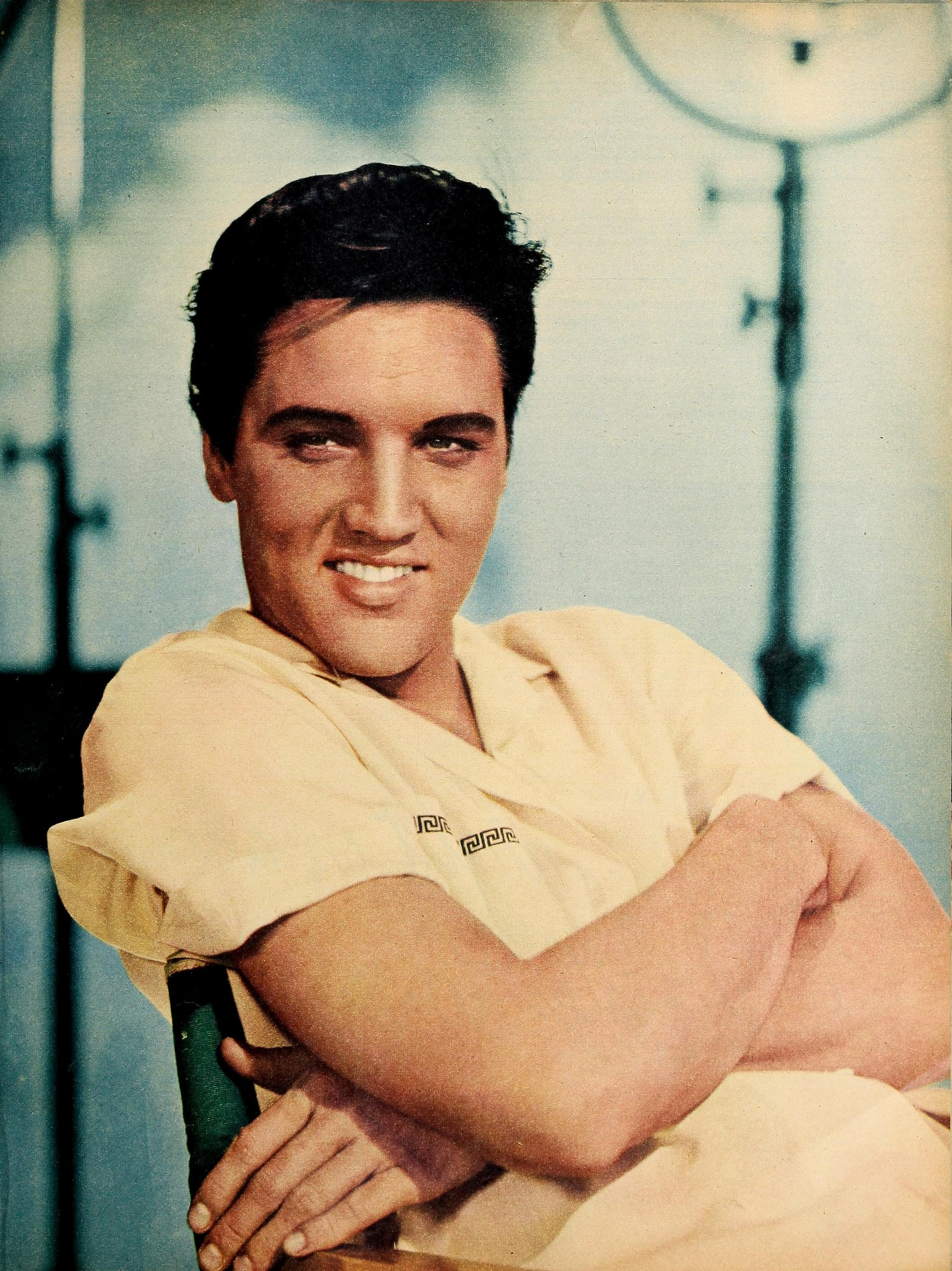
Often referred to as the "King of Rock and Roll," Elvis Presley dominated the music charts in the 1960s with his charismatic stage presence and unique blend of rock, pop, and blues.

R&B remained extremely popular during the 1950s among black audiences, but the style was not considered appropriate for whites, or respectable middle-class blacks, because of its suggestive nature. Many popular R&B songs instead were performed by white musicians like Pat Boone, in a more palatable, mainstream style, and turned into pop hits. By the end of the 1950s, however, there was a wave of popular black blues-rock and country-influenced R&B performers gaining unprecedented fame among white listeners; these included Bo Diddley and Chuck Berry. Over time, producers in the R&B field gradually turned to more rock-based acts like Little Richard and Fats Domino.

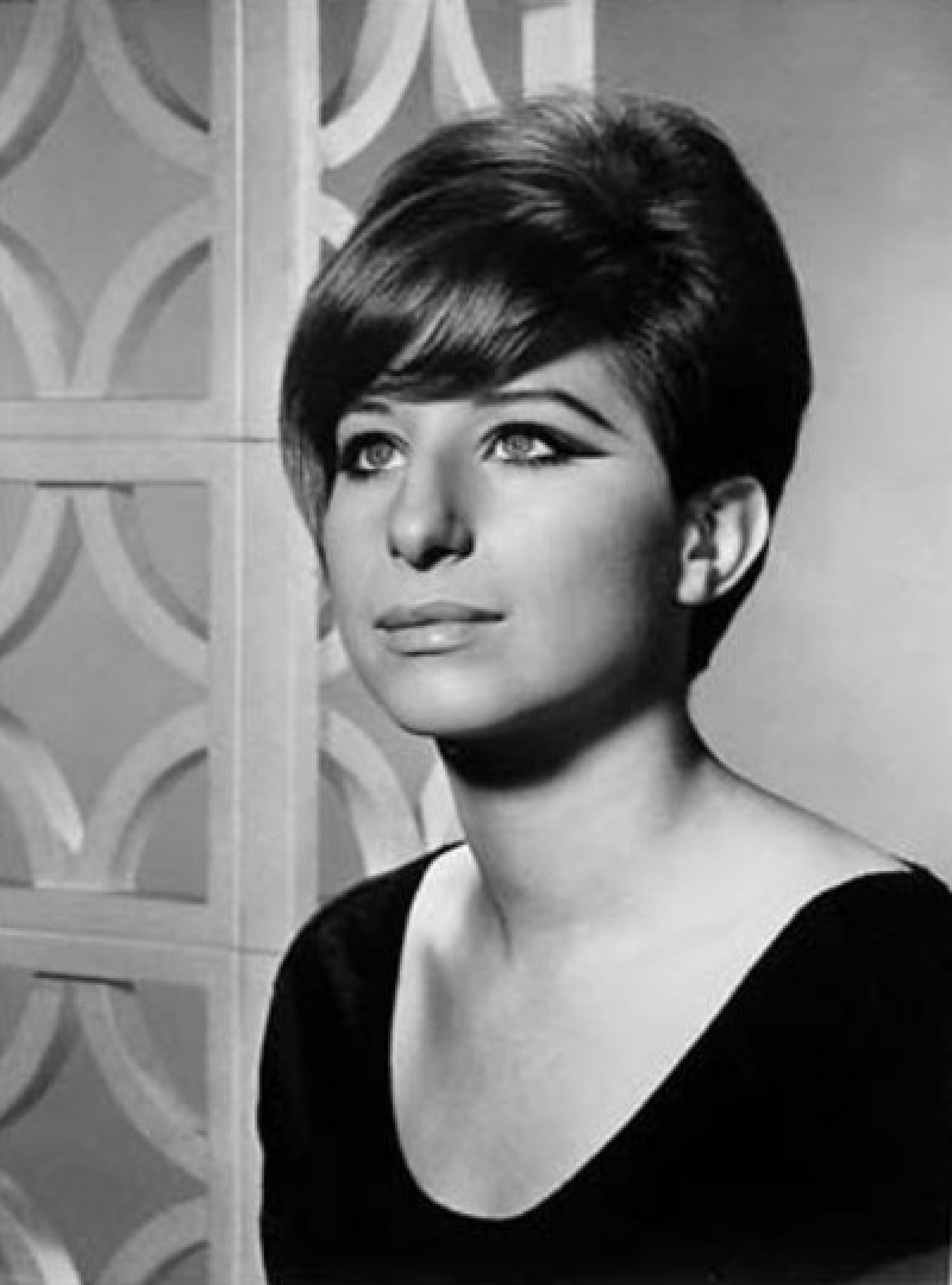
Barbra Streisand became one of the most successful and acclaimed singers of the 1960s, known for her powerful voice and dramatic performances.

Doo wop is a kind of vocal harmony music performed by groups who became popular in the 1950s. Though sometimes considered a kind of rock, doo wop is more precisely a fusion of vocal R&B, gospel and jazz with the blues and pop structures, though until the 1960s, the lines separating rock from doo wop, R&B and other related styles were very blurry. Doo wop became the first style of R&B-derived music "to take shape, to define itself as something people recognized as new, different, strange, theirs" (emphasis in original). As doo wop grew more popular, more innovations were added, including the use of a bass lead vocalist, a practice that began with Jimmy Ricks of The Ravens. Doo wop performers were originally almost all black, but a few white and integrated groups soon became popular. These included a number of Italian-American groups such as Dion & the Belmonts, while others added female vocalists and even formed all-female groups in the nearly universally male field; these included The Queens and The Chantels.

The 1950s saw a number of brief fads that went on to have a great impact on future styles of music. Performers such as Pete Seeger and The Weavers popularized a form of old-time revival of Anglo-American music. This field eventually became associated with the political left-wing and Communism, leading to a decline in acceptability as artists were increasingly blacklisted and criticized. Nevertheless, this form of pop-folk exerted a profound influence in the form of 1950s folk-rock and related styles. Alongside the rather sporadic success of popularized Anglo folk music came a series of Latin dance fads, including mambo, rumba, chachachá and boogaloo. Though their success was again sporadic and brief, Latin music continued to exert a continuous influence on rock, soul and other styles, as well as eventually evolving into salsa music in the 1970s.

=== Country: Nashville Sound ===
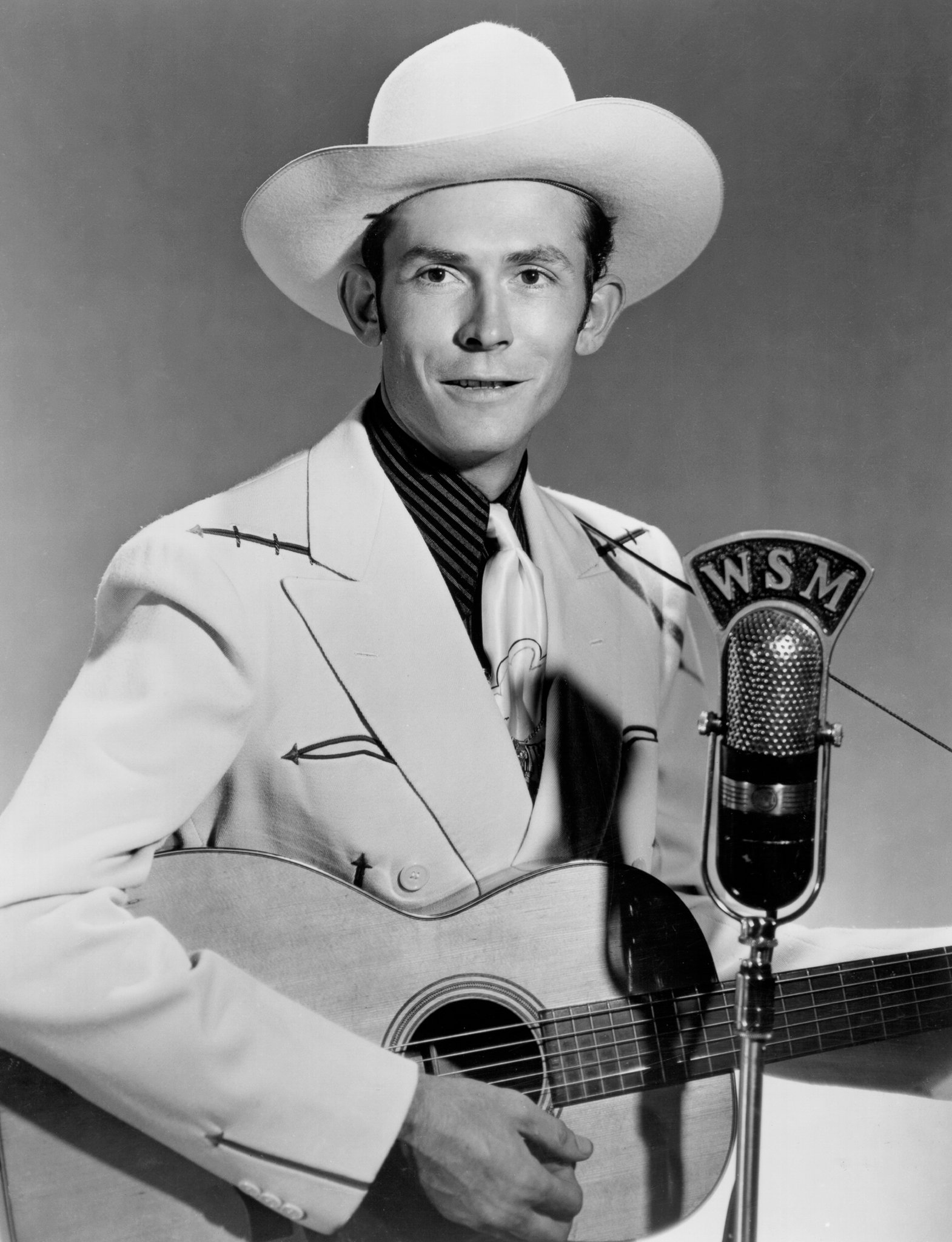
Hank Williams, often regarded as one of the greatest country music artists of all time, had a profound influence on the genre during the 1950s.

Beginning in the late 1920s, a distinctive style first called "old-timey" or "hillbilly" music began to be broadcast and recorded in the rural South and Midwest; early artists included the Carter Family, Charlie Poole and his North Carolina Ramblers, and Jimmie Rodgers. The performance and dissemination of this music was regional at first, but the population shifts caused by World War II spread it more widely. After the war, there was increased interest in specialty styles, including what had been known as race and hillbilly music; these styles were renamed to rhythm and blues and country and western, respectively. Major labels had some success promoting two kinds of country acts: Southern novelty performers like Tex Williams and singers like Frankie Laine, who mixed pop and country in a conventionally sentimental style. This period also saw the rise of Hank Williams, a white country singer who had learned the blues from a black street musician named Tee-Tot, in northwest Alabama. Before his death in 1953, Hank Williams recorded eleven singles that sold at least a million copies each and pioneered the Nashville sound.

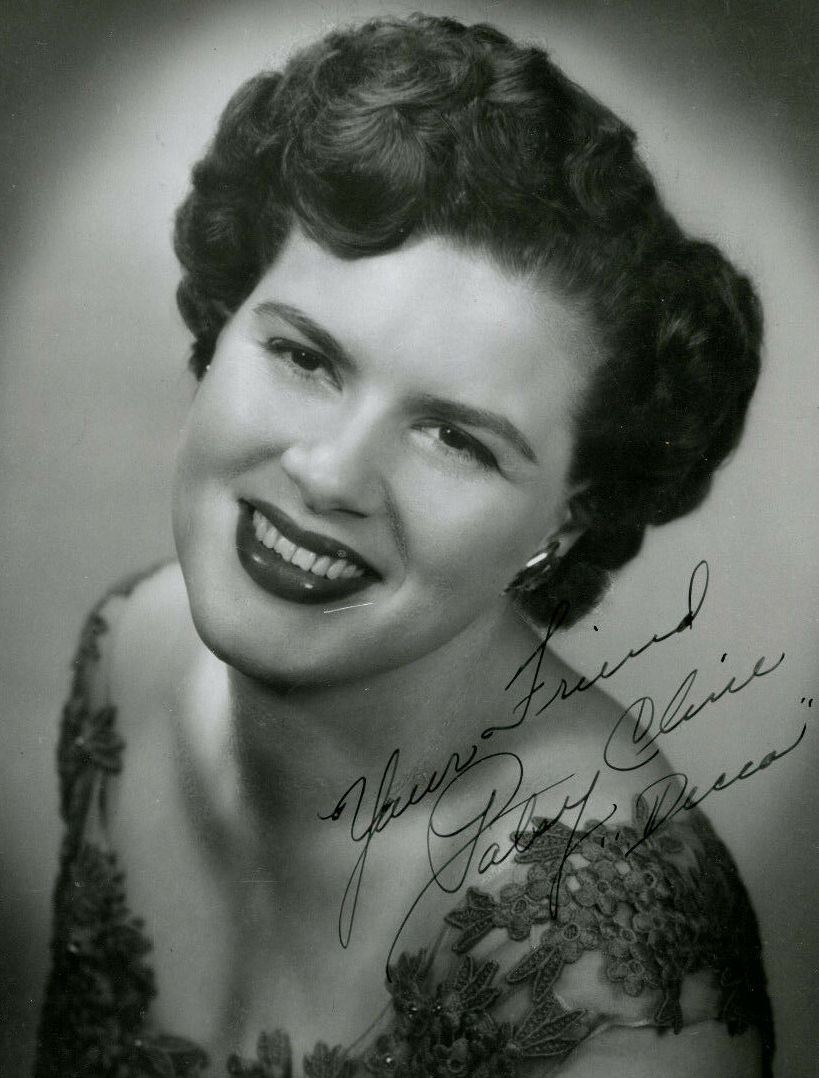
Patsy Cline was one of the most iconic female country singers of the 1960s.

The Nashville sound was a popular kind of country music that arose in the 1950s, a fusion of popular big band jazz and swing with the lyricism of honky-tonk country. The popular success of Hank Williams' recordings had convinced record labels that country music could find mainstream audiences. Record companies then tried to strip the rough, honky-tonk elements from country music, removing the unapologetically rural sound that had made Williams famous. Nashville's industry was reacting to the rise of rockabilly performer Elvis Presley by marketing performers that crossed the divide between country and pop. Chet Atkins, head of RCA's country music division, did the most to innovate the Nashville sound by abandoning the rougher elements of country, while Owen Bradley used sophisticated production techniques and smooth instrumentation that eventually became standard in the Nashville Sound, which also grew to incorporate strings and vocal choirs. By the early part of the 1960s, the Nashville sound was perceived as watered-down by many more traditionalist performers and fans, resulting in a number of local scenes like the Lubbock sound and, most influentially, the Bakersfield sound.

Throughout the 1950s, the most popular kind of country music was the Nashville Sound, which was a slick and pop-oriented style. Many musicians preferred a rougher sound, leading to the development of the Lubbock Sound and Bakersfield Sound. The Bakersfield Sound was innovated in Bakersfield, California in the mid to late 1950s, by performers like Wynn Stewart, who used elements of Western swing and rock, such as the breakbeat, along with a honky tonk vocal style. He was followed by a wave of performers, among them Buck Owens and Merle Haggard, who popularized the style.

=== Soul ===
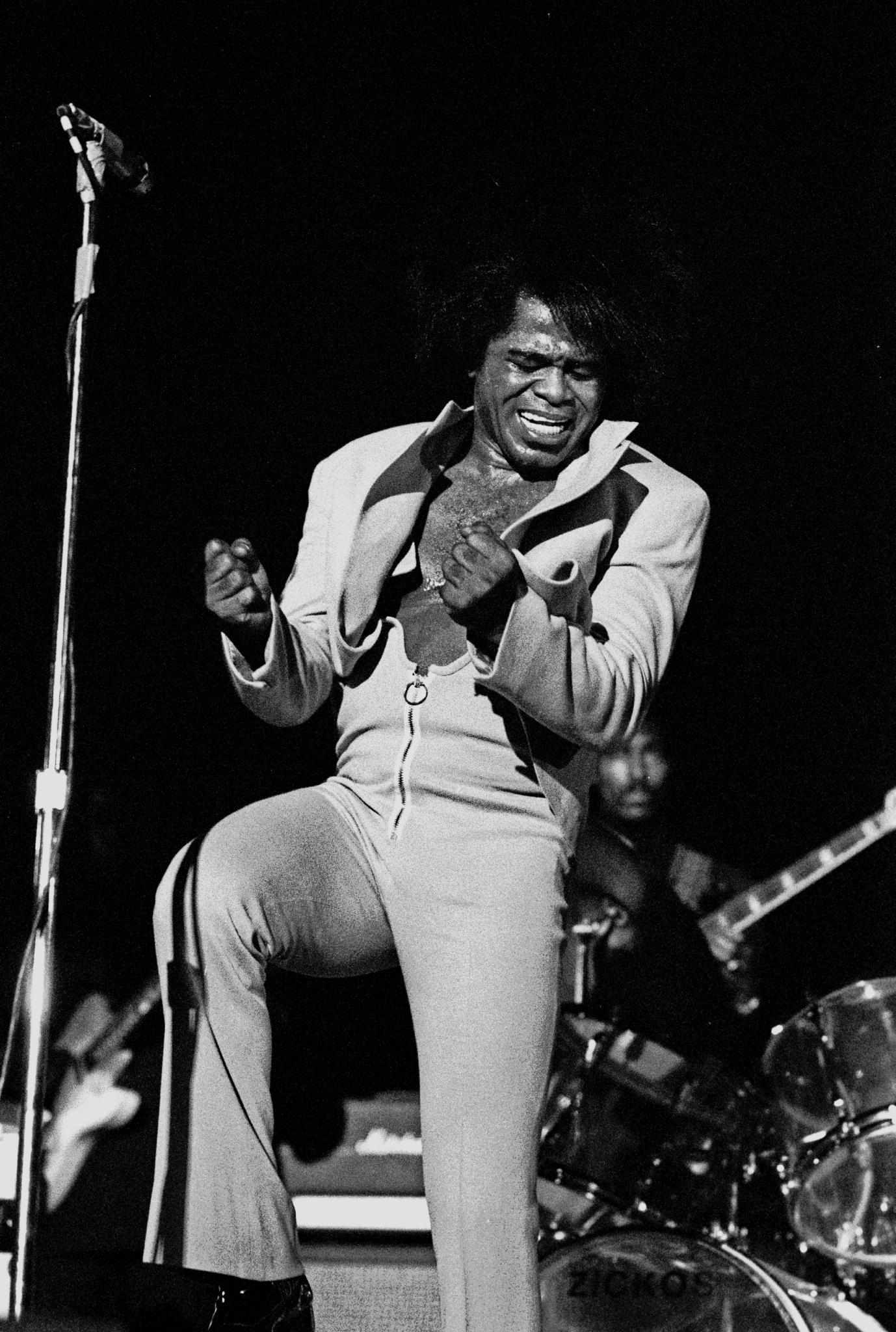
James Brown is known as the "Godfather of Soul"

Soul music is a combination of R&B and gospel that began in the late 1950s in the United States. Soul music is characterized by its use of gospel techniques with a greater emphasis on vocalists, and the use of secular themes. The 1950s recordings of Sam Cooke, Ray Charles, and James Brown are commonly considered the beginnings of soul music. Solomon Burke's early recordings for Atlantic Records codified the style, and as Peter Guralnick writes, "it was only with the coming together of Burke and Atlantic Records that you could see anything resembling a movement".

The Motown Record Corporation in Detroit, Michigan became successful with a string of heavily pop-influenced soul records, which were palatable enough to white listeners so as to allow R&B and soul to crossover to mainstream audiences. An important center of soul music recording was Florence, Alabama, where the FAME Studios operated. Jimmy Hughes, Percy Sledge and Arthur Alexander recorded at Fame; later in the 1960s, Aretha Franklin would also record in the area. Fame Studios, often referred to as Muscle Shoals, after a town neighboring Florence, enjoyed a close relationship with Stax, and many of the musicians and producers who worked in Memphis also contributed to recordings done in Alabama.

In Memphis, Stax Records produced recordings by soul pioneers Otis Redding, Wilson Pickett, and Don Covay. Other Stax artists such as Eddie Floyd and Johnnie Taylor also made significant contributions to soul music. By 1968, the soul music movement had begun to splinter, as James Brown and Sly & the Family Stone began to expand upon and abstract both soul and rhythm and blues into other forms. Guralnick wrote that more "than anything else ... what seems to me to have brought the era of soul to a grinding, unsettling halt was the death of Martin Luther King in April 1968".

=== 1960s rock ===
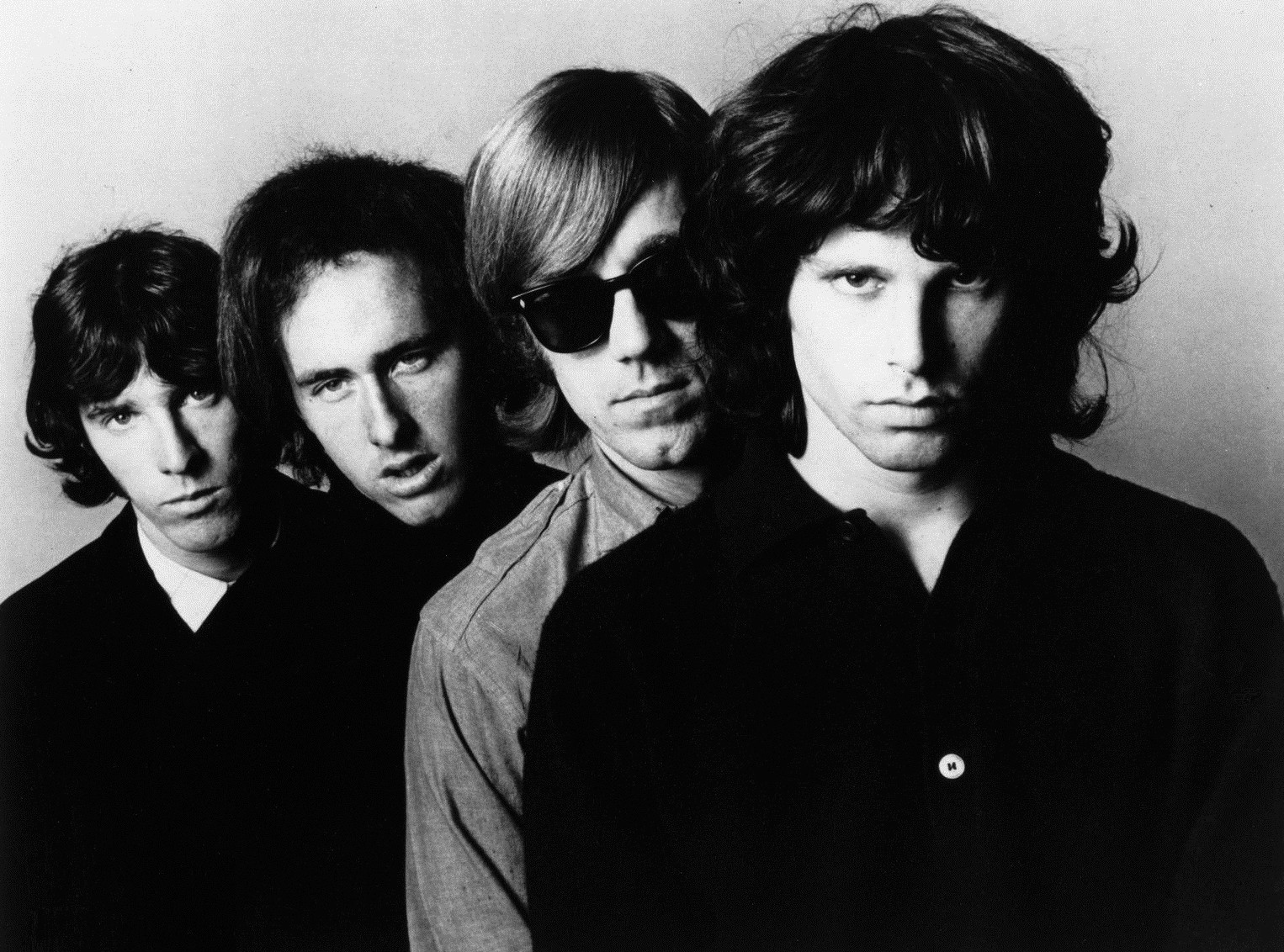
The Doors blended rock, blues, and psychedelia to create a dark and hypnotic sound.

Among the first of the major new rock genres of the 1960s was surf, pioneered by Californian Dick Dale. Surf was largely instrumental and guitar-based rock with a distorted and twanging sound, and was associated with the Southern California surfing-based youth culture. Dale had worked with Leo Fender, developing the "Showman amplifier and... the reverberation unit that would give surf music its distinctively fuzzy sound".

Inspired by the lyrical focus of surf, if not the musical basis, The Beach Boys began their career in 1961 with a string of hits like "Surfin' U.S.A.". Their sound was not instrumental, nor guitar-based, but was full of "rich, dense and unquestionably special" "floating vocals (with) Four Freshman-ish harmonies riding over a droned, propulsive burden". The Beach Boys' songwriter Brian Wilson grew gradually more eccentric, experimenting with new studio techniques as he became associated with the burgeoning counterculture.

The counterculture was a youth movement that included political activism, especially in opposition to the Vietnam War, and the promotion of various hippie ideals. The hippies were associated primarily with two kinds of music: the folk-rock and country rock of people like Bob Dylan and Gram Parsons, and the psychedelic rock of bands like Jefferson Airplane and The Doors. This movement was very closely connected to the British Invasion, a wave of bands from the United Kingdom who became popular throughout much of the 1960s. The British Invasion initially included bands such as the Beatles, the Rolling Stones, and The Zombies who were later joined by bands like the Moody Blues and The Who. The sound of these bands was hard-edged rock, with the Beatles originally known for songs that resembled classic black rock songs by Little Richard, Chuck Berry, Smokey Robinson, The Shirelles and the Isley Brothers. Later, as the counterculture developed, The Beatles began using more advanced techniques and unusual instruments, such as the sitar, as well as more original lyrics.

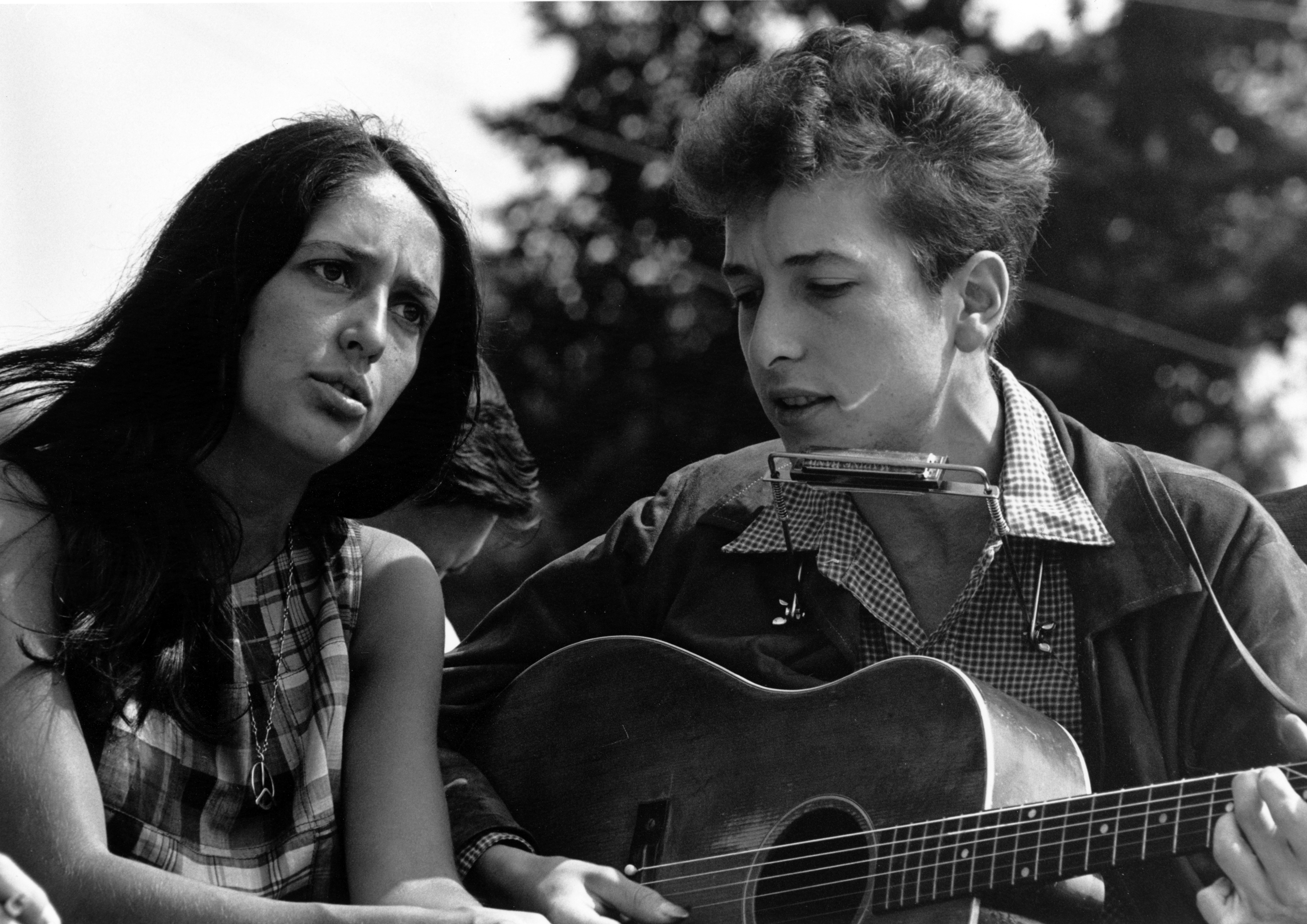
Joan Baez and Bob Dylan

Folk-rock drew on the sporadic mainstream success of groups like the Kingston Trio and the Almanac Singers, while Woody Guthrie and Pete Seeger helped to politically radicalize rural white folk music. The popular musician Bob Dylan rose to prominence in the middle of the 1960s, fusing folk with rock and making the nascent scene closely connected to the Civil Rights Movement. He was followed by a number of country-rock bands like The Byrds and the Flying Burrito Brothers and folk-oriented singer-songwriters like Joan Baez and the Canadian Joni Mitchell. However, by the end of the decade, there was little political or social awareness evident in the lyrics of pop-singer-songwriters like James Taylor and Carole King, whose self-penned songs were deeply personal and emotional.

Psychedelic rock was a hard, driving kind of guitar-based rock, closely associated with the city of San Francisco, California. Though Jefferson Airplane was the only psychedelic San Francisco band to have a major national hit, with 1967's "Somebody to Love" and "White Rabbit", the Grateful Dead, a folk, country and bluegrass-flavored jam band, "embodied all the elements of the San Francisco scene and came... to represent the counterculture to the rest of the country"; the Grateful Dead also became known for introducing the counterculture, and the rest of the country, to the ideas of people like Timothy Leary, especially the use of hallucinogenic drugs including LSD for spiritual and philosophical purposes.

== 1970s and 1980s ==
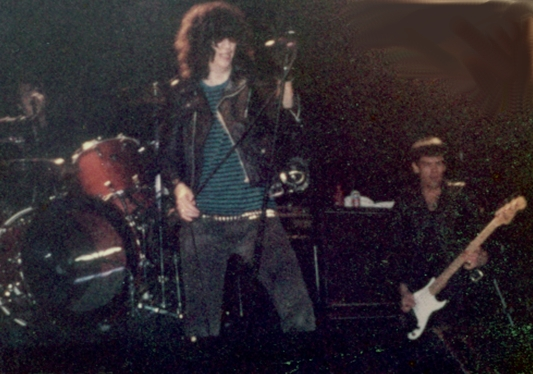
The Ramones originated in the 1970s.

Following the turbulent political, social and musical changes of the 1960s and early 1970s, rock music diversified. What was formerly known as rock and roll, a reasonably discrete style of music, had evolved into a catchall category called simply rock music, an umbrella term which would eventually include diverse styles like heavy metal music, punk rock and, sometimes even hip hop music. During the 1970s, however, most of these styles were not part of mainstream music, and were evolving in the underground music scene.

The early 1970s saw a wave of singer-songwriters who drew on the introspective, deeply emotional and personal lyrics of 1960s folk-rock. They included James Taylor, Carole King and others, all known just as much for their lyric ability as for their performances. The same period saw the rise of bluesy Southern rock and country rock groups like the Allman Brothers Band and Lynyrd Skynyrd. In the 1970s, soft rock developed, a kind of simple, unobtrusive and mellow form of pop-rock, exemplified by a number of bands like America and Bread, most of whom are little remembered today; many were one-hit wonders. In addition, harder arena rock bands like Chicago and Styx also saw some major success.

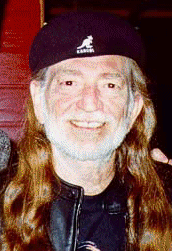
Willie Nelson

The early 1970s saw the rise of a new style of country music that was as rough and hard-edged, and which quickly became the most popular form of country. This was outlaw country, a style that included such mainstream stars as Willie Nelson and Waylon Jennings. Outlaw country was very rock-oriented, and had lyrics that focused on the criminal, especially drug and alcohol-related, antics of its performers, who grew their hair long, wore denim and leather and looked like hippies in contrast to the clean-cut country singers that were pushing the Nashville sound.

By the mid-1970s, disco, a form of dance music, was becoming popular, evolving from underground dance clubs to mainstream America. Disco reached its zenith following the release of Saturday Night Fever and the phenomenon surrounding the movie and the soundtrack by The Bee Gees. Disco's time was short, however, and by 1980 was soon replaced with a number of genres that evolved out of the punk rock scene, like new wave. Bruce Springsteen became a major star, first in the mid to late 1970s and then throughout the 1980s, with dense, inscrutable lyrics and anthemic songs that resonated with the middle and lower classes.

=== 1970s funk and soul ===
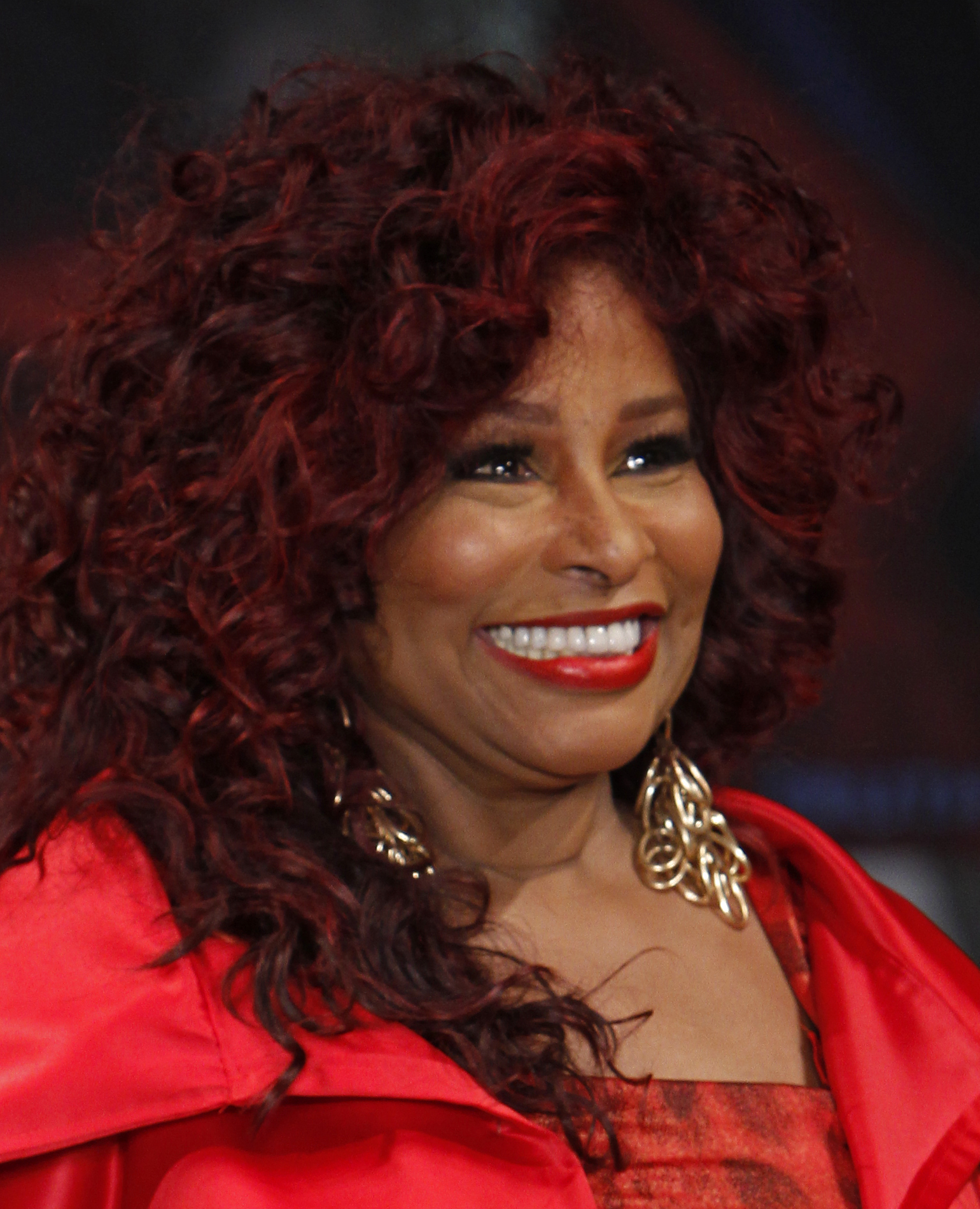
Chaka Khan showcased her soulful vocals and helped solidify her status as the "Queen of Funk."

In the early 1970s, soul music was influenced by psychedelic rock and other styles. The social and political ferment of the times inspired artists like Marvin Gaye and Curtis Mayfield to release album-length statements with hard-hitting social commentary. Artists like James Brown led soul towards more dance-oriented music, which eventually evolved into funk. Funk was typified by 1970s bands like Parliament-Funkadelic, The Meters, and James Brown himself, while more versatile groups like War, The Commodores and Earth, Wind and Fire also became popular. During the 1970s, some highly slick and commercial blue-eyed soul acts like Philadelphia's Hall & Oates achieved mainstream success, as well as a new generation of street-corner harmony or city-soul groups like The Delfonics and Howard University's Unifics.

By the end of the 1970s, Philly soul, funk, rock and most other genres were dominated by disco-inflected tracks. During this period, funk bands like The O'Jays and The Spinners continued to turn out hits. After the death of disco in 1980, soul music survived for a short time before going through yet another metamorphosis. With the introduction of influences from electro music and funk, soul music became less raw and more slickly produced, resulting in a genre of music that was again called R&B, usually distinguished from the earlier rhythm and blues by identifying it as contemporary R&B.

=== 1980s pop ===
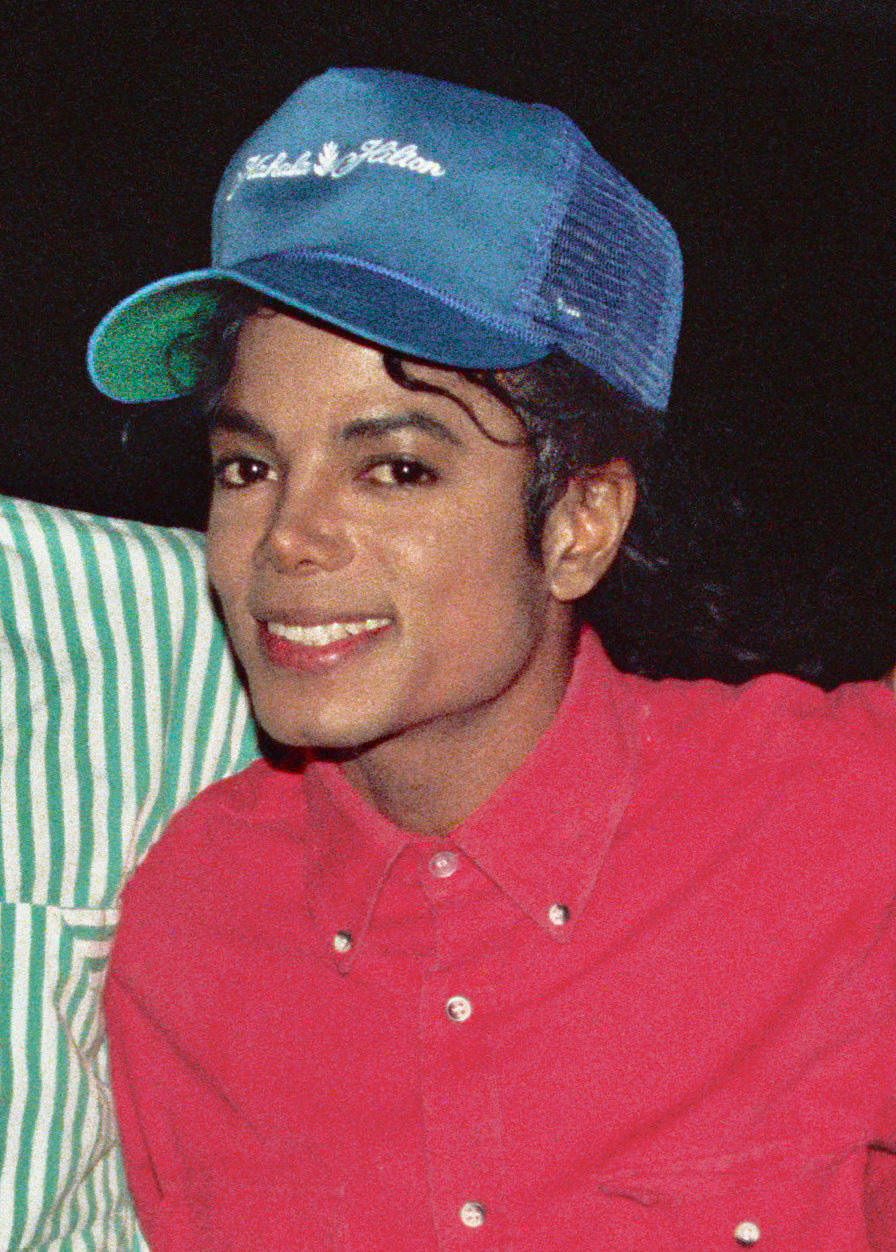
Michael Jackson emerged as a cultural icon and one of the most influential figures in pop music history.

By the 1960s, the term rhythm and blues had no longer been in wide use; instead, terms such as soul music were used to describe popular music by black artists. In the 1980s, however, rhythm and blues came back into use, most often in the form of R&B, a usage that has continued to the present. Contemporary R&B arose when sultry funk singers like Prince became very popular, alongside dance-oriented pop stars like Michael Jackson and Madonna.

By the end of the 1980s, pop-rock largely consisted of the radio-friendly glam metal bands, who used images derived from the British glam movement with macho lyrics and attitudes, accompanied by hard rock music and heavy metal virtuosic soloing. Bands from this era included many British groups like Def Leppard, as well as heavy metal-influenced American bands Mötley Crüe, Guns N' Roses, Bon Jovi and Van Halen.

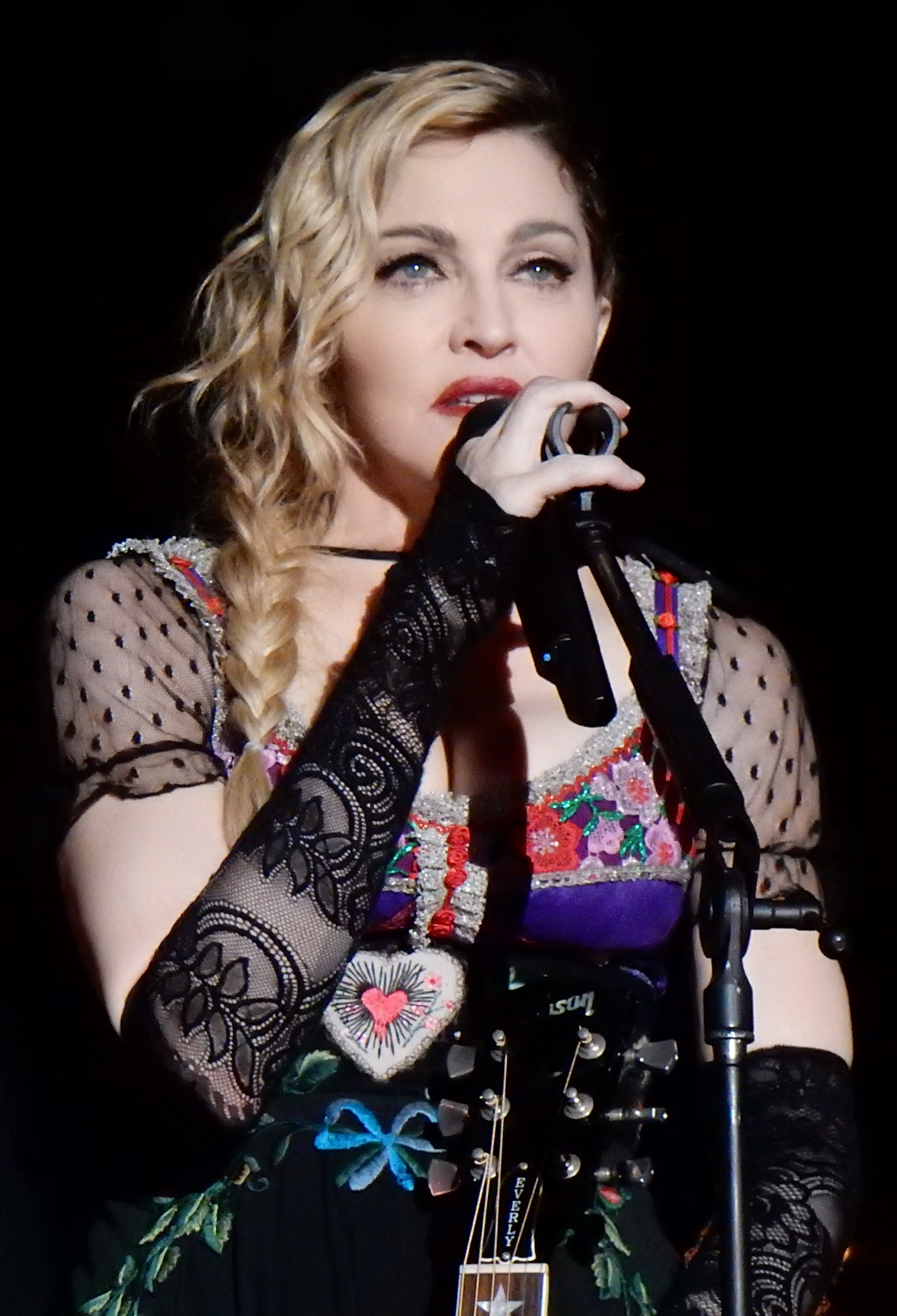
Madonna reigned as the undisputed queen of Pop in the 1980s.

The mid-1980s also saw Gospel music see its popularity peak. A new form of gospel had evolved, called Contemporary Christian music (CCM). CCM had been around since the late 1960s, and consisted of a pop/rock sound with slight religious lyrics. CCM had become the most popular form of gospel by the mid-1980s, especially with artists like Amy Grant, Michael W. Smith, and Kathy Troccoli. Amy Grant was the most popular CCM, and gospel, singer of the 1980s, and after experiencing unprecedented success in CCM, crossed over into mainstream pop in the 1980s and 1990s. Michael W. Smith also had considerable success in CCM before crossing over to a successful career in pop music as well. Grant would later produce CCM's first No. 1 pop hit ("Baby Baby"), and CCM's best-selling album (Heart in Motion).

In the 1980s, the country music charts were dominated by pop singers with only tangential influences from country music, a trend that has continued since. The 1980s saw a revival of honky-tonk-style country with the rise of people like Dwight Yoakam and the new traditionalists Emmylou Harris and Ricky Skaggs, as well as the development of alternative country performers like Uncle Tupelo. Later alternative country performers, like Whiskeytown's Ryan Adams and Wilco, found some mainstream success.

=== Birth of the underground ===
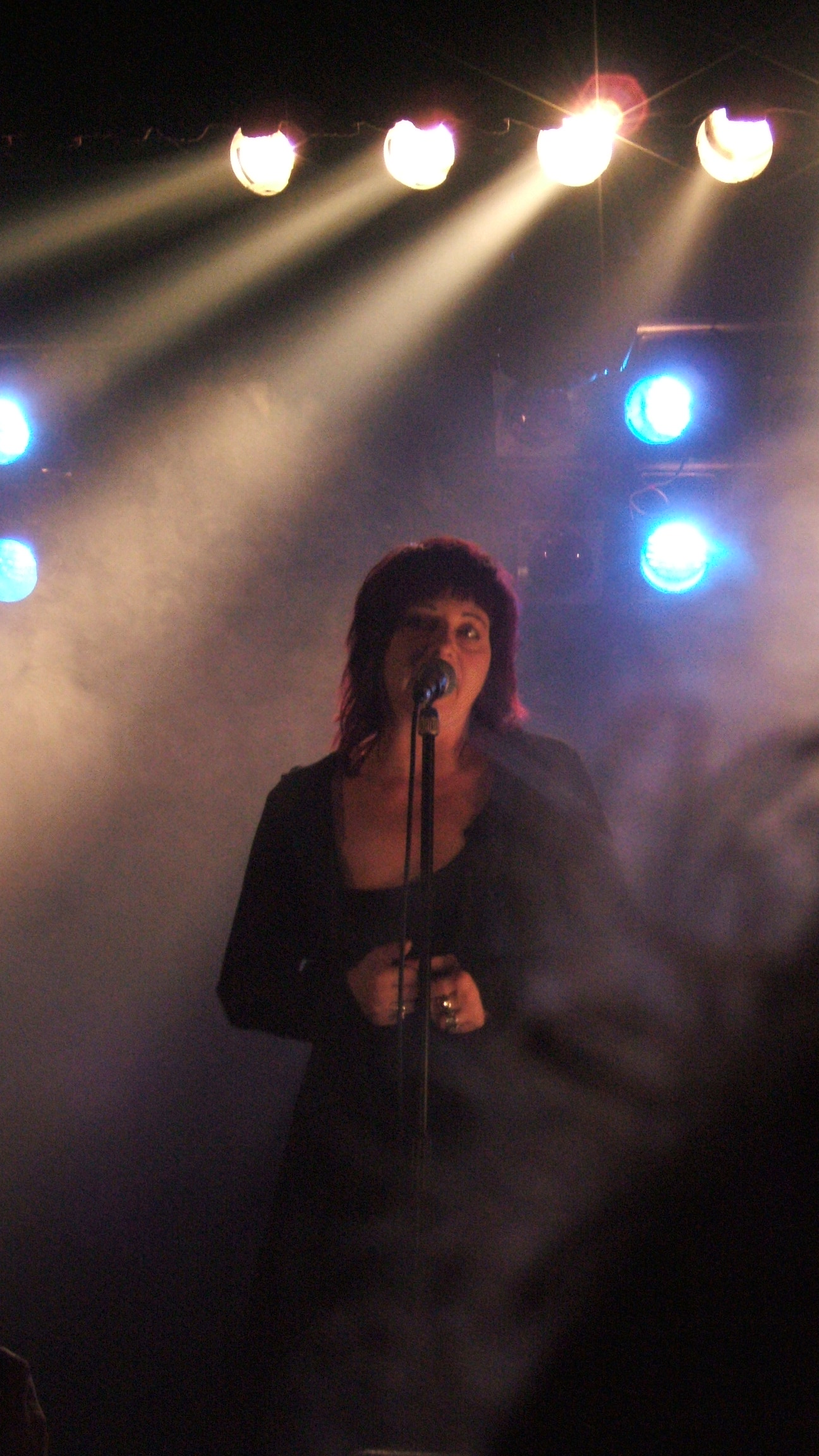
Artists like Lydia Lunch, and Sonic Youth experimented with avant-garde sounds, challenging the boundaries of what constituted music.

During the 1970s, a number of diverse styles emerged in stark contrast to mainstream American popular music. Though these genres were not largely popular in the sense of selling many records to mainstream audiences, they were examples of popular music, as opposed to folk or classical music. In the early 1970s, African Americans and Puerto Ricans in New York City developed hip hop culture, which produced a style of music also called hip hop. At roughly the same time, Latinos, especially Cubans and Puerto Ricans, in New York also innovated salsa music, which combined many forms of Latin music with R&B and rock. The genres of punk rock and heavy metal were most closely associated with the United Kingdom in the 1970s, while various American derivatives evolved later in the decade and into the 1980s. Meanwhile, Detroit slowly evolved a series of electronic music genres like house and techno that later became a major part of popular music worldwide.

==== Hip hop ====
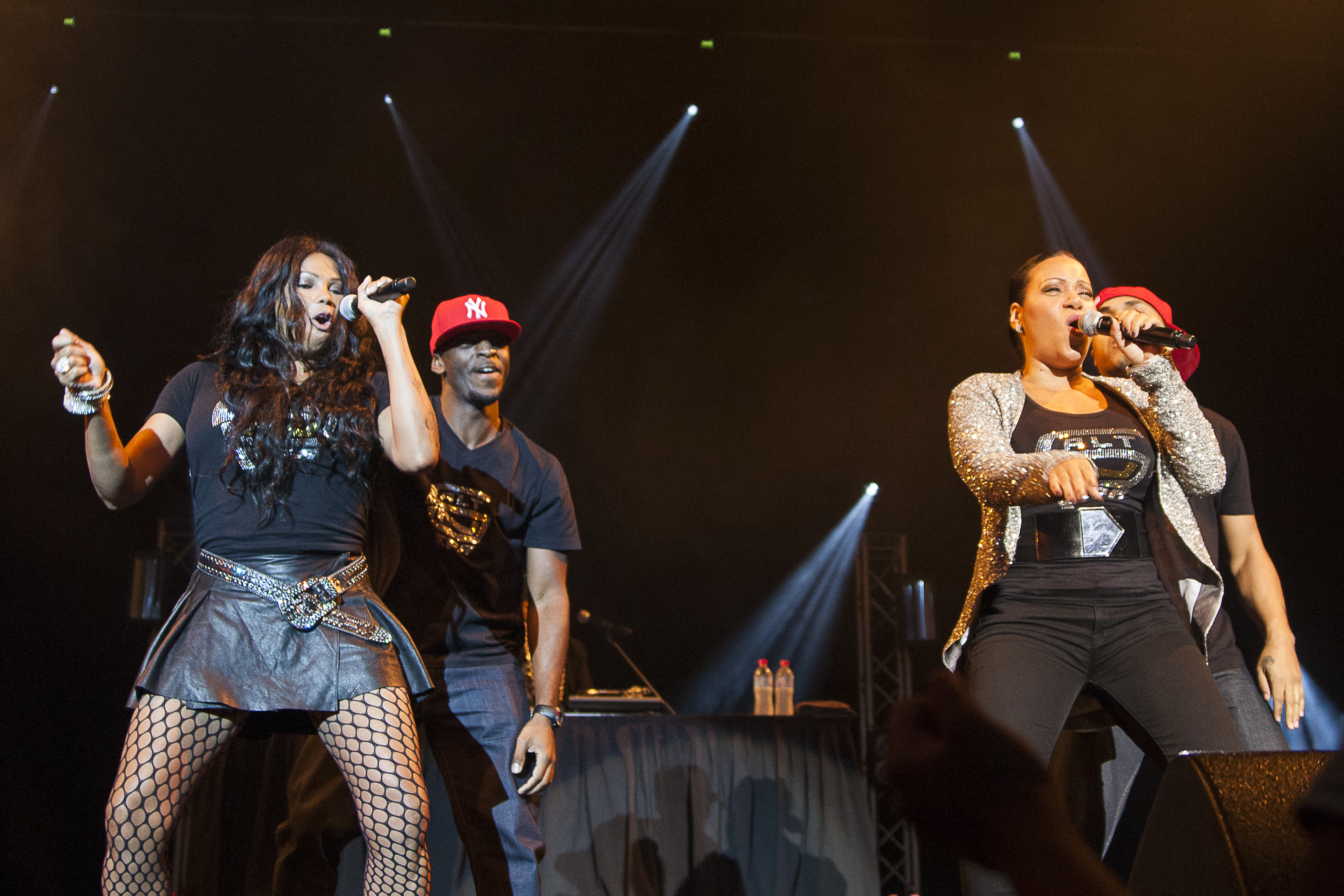
Salt-N-Pepa became one of the most successful and influential female rap groups of all time.

Hip hop is a cultural movement, of which music is a part, along with graffiti and breakdancing. The music is composed of two parts, rapping, the delivery of swift, highly rhythmic and lyrical vocals, and DJing, the production of instrumentation either through sampling, instrumentation, turntablism or beatboxing. Hip hop arose in the early 1970s in The Bronx, New York City. Jamaican immigrant DJ Kool Herc is widely regarded as the progenitor of hip hop; he brought with him the practice of toasting over the rhythms of popular songs. In New York, DJs like Kool Herc played records of popular funk, disco and rock songs. Emcees originally arose to introduce the songs and keep the crowd excited and dancing; over time, the DJs began isolating the percussion breaks (the rhythmic climax of songs), thus producing a repeated beat that the emcees rapped over.

Rapping included greetings to friends and enemies, exhortations to dance and colorful, often humorous boasts. By the beginning of the 1980s, there had been popular hip-hop songs like "Rappers Delight" by the Sugarhill Gang and a few major celebrities of the scene, such as LL Cool J and Kurtis Blow. Other performers experimented with politicized lyrics and social awareness, while others performed fusions with jazz, heavy metal, techno, funk and soul. Hip hop began to diversify in the latter part of the 1980s. New styles appeared, like alternative hip hop and the closely related jazz rap fusion, pioneered by such rappers as De La Soul and Guru. The crews Public Enemy and N.W.A did the most during this era to bring hip hop to national attention; the former did so with incendiary and politically charged lyrics, while the latter became the first prominent example of gangsta rap.

==== Salsa ====
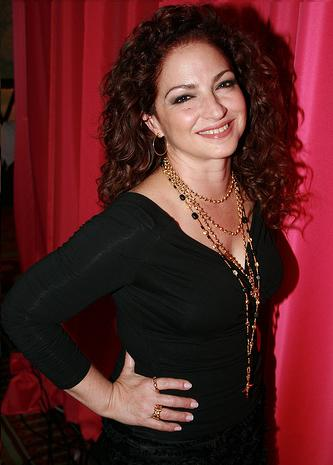
Gloria Estefan, along with her band Miami Sound Machine, became one of the most successful Latin acts of the 1980s.

Salsa music is a diverse and predominantly Caribbean rhythm that is popular in many Latin American countries. Salsa incorporates multiple styles and variations; the term can be used to describe most any form of the popular Cuban-derived musical genres (like chachachá and mambo). Most specifically however, salsa refers to a particular style developed by mid-1970s groups of New York City-area Cuban and Puerto Rican immigrants to the United States, and stylistic descendants like 1980s salsa romantica.

Salsa music always has a 4/4 meter. The music is phrased in groups of two bars, using recurring rhythmic patterns, and the beginning of phrases in the song text and instruments. Typically, the rhythmic patterns played on the percussion are rather complicated, often with several different patterns played simultaneously. The clave rhythm is an important element that forms the basis of salsa. Apart from percussion, a variety of melodic instruments are commonly used as accompaniment, such as a guitar, trumpets, trombones, the piano, and many others, all depending on the performing artists. Bands are typically divided into horn and rhythm sections, led by one or more singers (soneros or salseros) .

=== Punk and alternative rock ===
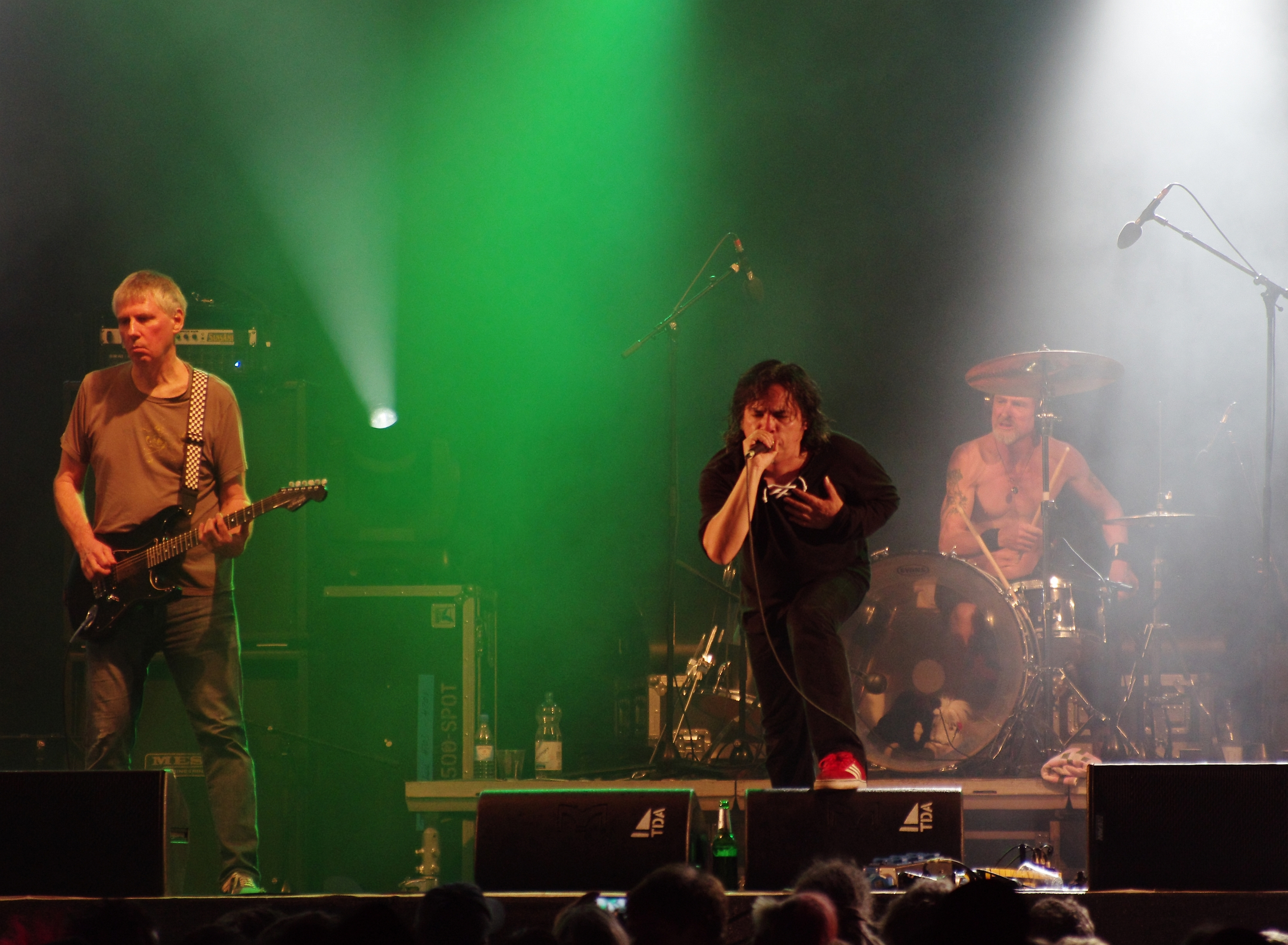
Black Flag emerged from DIY punk scenes, like other punk bands of the time.

Punk was a kind of rebellious rock music that began in the 1970s as a reaction against the popular music of the day – especially disco, which was seen as insipid and uninspired. Punk drew on American bands including the Velvet Underground, The Stooges and the New York Dolls. Punk was loud, aggressive and usually very simple, requiring little musical training to play. Later in the decade, British bands including the Sex Pistols and The Clash enjoyed substantial fame at home and, to a lesser degree, in the United States. American bands in the field included most famously The Ramones, as well as groups like Talking Heads that played a more artsy kind of music that was closely associated with punk before eventually evolving into pop-new wave. Other major acts include Blondie, Patti Smith and Television. Most of these bands got their start at what is considered "ground zero" of punk rock, a club named CBGB. The small club in New York threw a festival in 1975 that showed off the "top 40 unrecorded rock bands". Among these bands were the previously mentioned The Ramones, Sex Pistols, Blondie and the like.

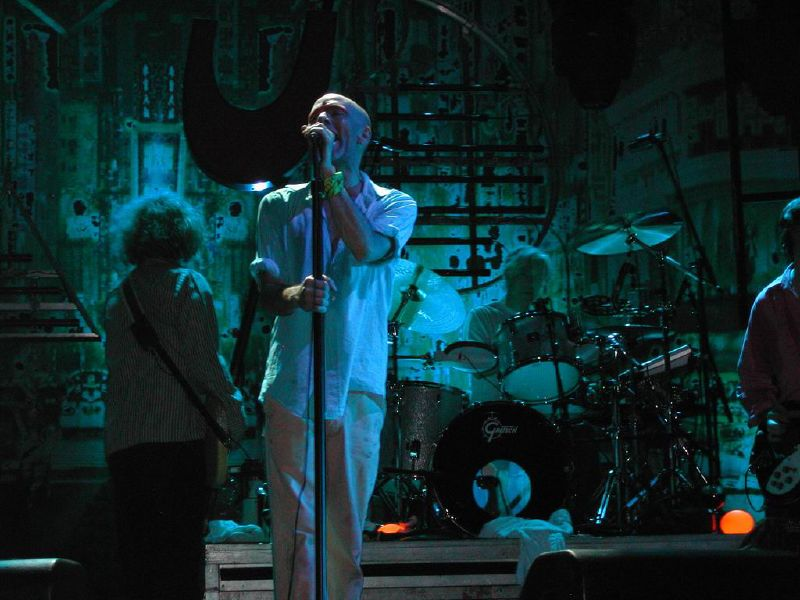
R.E.M. became one of the pioneering bands of alternative rock in the 1980s.

Hardcore punk was the response of American youths to the worldwide punk rock explosion of the late 1970s. Hardcore stripped punk rock and New Wave of its sometimes elitist and artsy tendencies, resulting in short, fast, and intense songs that spoke to disaffected youth. Hardcore exploded in the American metropolises of Los Angeles, Washington, D.C., New York and Boston and most American cities had their own local scenes by the end of the 1980s.

Alternative rock is a diverse grouping of rock bands that in America developed largely from the hardcore scene in the 1980s in stark opposition to the mainstream music scene. Alternative rock subgenres that developed during the decade include indie rock, Gothic rock, noise rock, grunge, and college rock. Most alternative bands were unified by their collective debt to punk, which laid the groundwork for underground and alternative music in the 1970s. Though the genre is considered to be rock, some styles were influenced by American folk, reggae and jazz. Like punk and hardcore, alternative rock had little mainstream success in America in the 1980s, but via the grassroots establishment of an indie scene through touring, college radio, fanzines, and word-of-mouth, alternative bands laid the groundwork for the breakthrough of the genre in the American public consciousness in the next decade.

=== Heavy metal ===
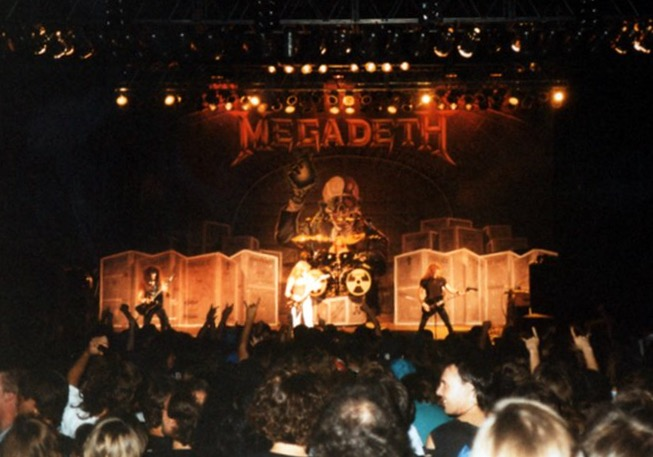
Megadeth formed by former Metallica guitarist Dave Mustaine, Megadeth quickly established themselves as one of the leading forces in thrash metal.

Heavy metal is a form of music characterized by aggressive, driving rhythms and highly amplified distorted guitars, generally with grandiose lyrics and virtuosic instrumentation. Heavy metal is a development of blues, blues rock, rock and prog rock. Its origins lie in the British hard rock bands who between 1967 and 1974 took blues and rock and created a hybrid with a heavy, guitar-and-drums-centered sound. Most of the pioneers in the field, like Black Sabbath, were English, though many were inspired by American performers like Blue Cheer and Jimi Hendrix.

In the early 1970s, the first major American bands began appearing, like Blue Öyster Cult and Aerosmith, and musicians like Eddie Van Halen began their career. Heavy metal remained, however, a largely underground phenomenon. During the 1980s, a pop-based form of hard rock, with a party-hearty spirit and a glam-influenced visual aesthetic (sometimes referred to as "hair metal") dominated the music charts, led by superstars like Poison, Bon Jovi, Mötley Crüe, and Ratt. The 1987 debut of Guns N' Roses, a hard rock band whose image reflected the grittier underbelly of the Sunset Strip, was at least in part a reaction against the overly polished image of hair metal, but that band's wild success was in many ways the last gasp of the hard-rock and metal scene. By the mid-1980s, as the term "heavy metal" became the subject of much contestation, the style had branched out in so many different directions that new classifications were created by fans, record companies, and fanzines, although sometimes the differences between various subgenres were unclear, even to the artists purportedly belonging to a given style. The most notable of the 1980s metal subgenres in the United States was the swift and aggressive thrash metal style, pioneered by bands like Anthrax, Megadeth, Metallica, and Slayer.

== 1990s ==
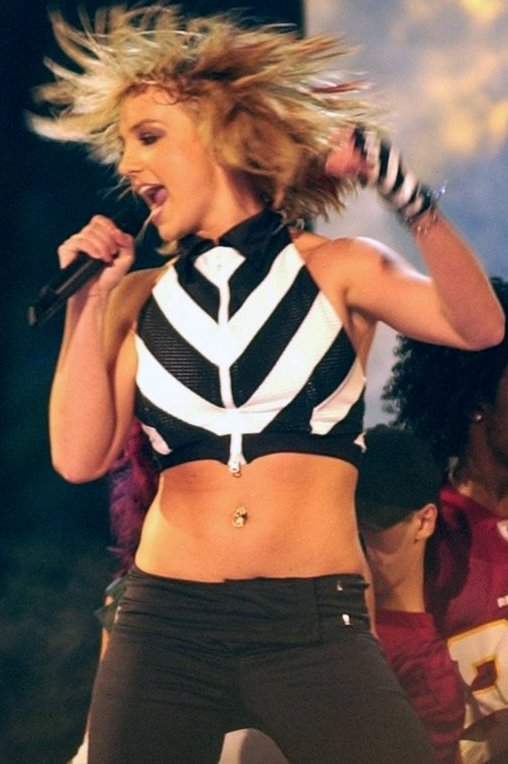
Britney Spears' impact on the music industry and popular culture of the late 1990s cannot be overstated. She played a pivotal role in shaping the sound and style of pop music during that era.

Perhaps the most important change in the 1990s in American popular music was the rise of alternative rock through the popularity of grunge. This was previously an explicitly anti-mainstream grouping of genres that rose to great fame beginning in the early 1990s. The genre in its early stages was largely situated on Sub Pop Records, a company founded by Bruce Pavitt and John Poneman. Significant grunge bands signed to the label were Green River (half of the members from this band would later become founding members of Pearl Jam), Sonic Youth (although not a grunge band they were influential on grunge bands and in fact it was upon the insistence of Kim Gordon that the David Geffen Company signed Nirvana) and Nirvana. Grunge is an alternative rock subgenre with a "dark, brooding guitar-based sludge" sound, drawing on heavy metal, punk, and elements of bands like Sonic Youth and their use of "unconventional tunings to bend otherwise standard pop songs completely out of shape." With the addition of a "melodic, Beatlesque element" to the sound of bands like Nirvana, grunge became wildly popular across the United States.

Grunge became commercially successful in the early 1990s, peaking between 1991 and 1994. Bands from cities in the U.S. Pacific Northwest especially Seattle, Washington, were responsible for creating grunge and later made it popular with mainstream audiences. The supposed Generation X, who had just reached adulthood as grunge's popularity peaked, were closely associated with grunge, the sound which helped "define the desperation of (that) generation." Bands such as Foo Fighters and Creed became a form of alternative rock known as post-grunge, popular because it was radio friendly unlike the grunge bands by which they were musically influenced. Pop punk bands like Green Day and Blink 182 also gained popularity. In the second half of the 1990s nu metal arose with bands such as Linkin Park, Korn, Limp Bizkit and Slipknot. The independent culture slumbered in the underground scenes with new genres such as lo-fi (Beck, Sparklehorse, Guided By Voices), math rock (Slint, Shellac) and post-rock (Explosions in the Sky, Tortoise). Emocore and Post-hardcore became more known with bands such as At the Drive-In and Fugazi.

Gangsta rap is a kind of hip hop, most importantly characterized by a lyrical focus on macho sexuality, physicality and a dangerous, criminal image. Though the origins of gangsta rap can be traced back to the mid-1980s raps of Philadelphia's Schoolly D and the West Coast's Ice-T, the style is usually said to have begun in the Los Angeles and Oakland area, where Too Short, N.W.A and others found their fame. This West Coast rap scene spawned the early 1990s G-funk sound, which paired gangsta rap lyrics with a thick and hazy tone, often relying on samples from 1970s P-funk; the best-known proponents of this sound were the breakthrough rappers Dr. Dre and Snoop Dogg.

== 2000s ==
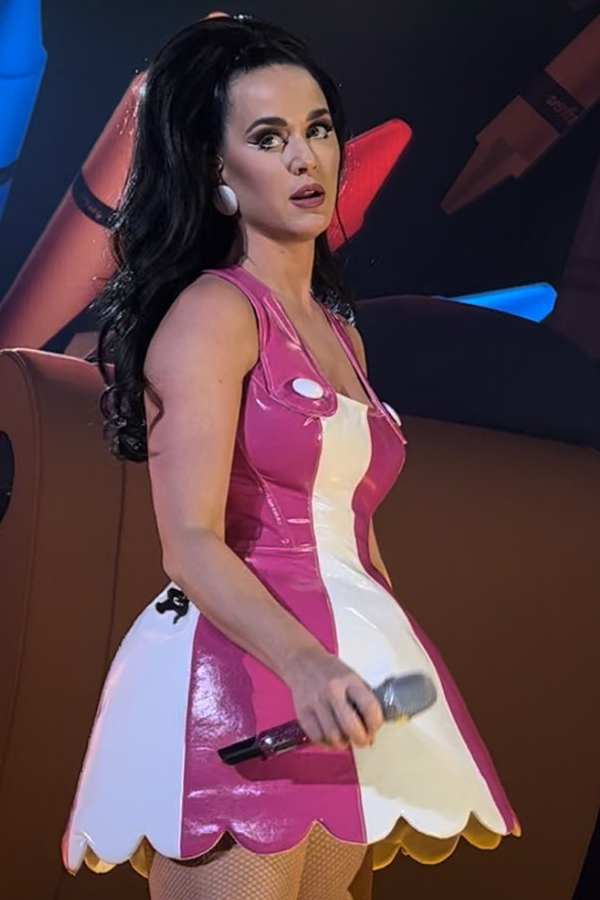
The 2000s marked Katy Perry's rise to prominence as a pop superstar.

By the end of the 1990s and into the early 2000s pop music consisted mostly of a combination of pop-hip hop and R&B-tinged pop, including a number of boy bands. Notable female singers also cemented their status in American and worldwide popular music, such as Beyoncé (with her solo career and as lead singer of Destiny's Child), Britney Spears, Christina Aguilera, Katy Perry, Lady Gaga and Taylor Swift. Also notable was the influence of hip-hop producers on popular music in the mid-late 2000s, who made the sounds first heard on Usher's Confessions and Nelly Furtado's Loose imitated throughout popular radio with artists Madonna, Akon and Lady Gaga. In the late 2000s into the early 2010s, pop music began to move towards being heavily influenced by the European electronic dance music scene, taking root in the college crowd through producers like David Guetta, Calvin Harris, Swedish House Mafia and Skrillex.

Hip hop/pop combination had also begun to dominate 2000s and early 2010s. In the early 2010s, prominent artists like Bruno Mars, Drake, Lil Wayne, 2 Chainz, Kendrick Lamar, Machine Gun Kelly, and Macklemore began to dominate the mainstream music scene.

The predominant sound in 1990s country music was pop with only very limited elements of country. This includes many of the best-selling artists of the 1990s, like Clint Black, Shania Twain, Faith Hill and the first of these crossover stars, Garth Brooks.

On the other hand a guitar revival took place and raised a new generation of alternative guitar bands often described as post-punk revival or garage rock revival. Prominent US bands of this generation are White Stripes, The Strokes, and The Killers.

== International and social impact ==
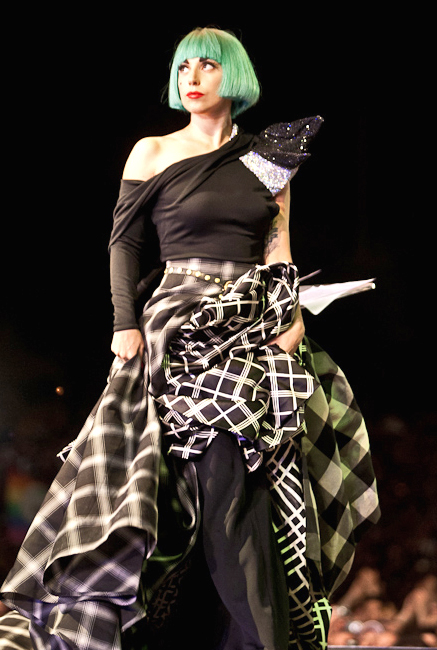
Lady Gaga's eccentric outfits, left a lasting mark on the fashion industry.

American popular music has become extremely popular internationally. Rock, pop, hip hop, jazz, country and other styles have fans across the globe. The combination of parts of international and American popular music has been attempted between the mid-1960s to the mid-1970s. However, the results of synthesis were for the most part unsuccessful. BBC Radio DJ Andy Kershaw, for example, has noted that country music is popular across virtually the entire world. Indeed, out of "all the contributions made by Americans to world culture ... (American popular music) has been taken (most) to heart by the entire world". Other styles of American popular music have also had a formative effect internationally, including funk, the basis for West African Afrobeat, R&B, a major source for Jamaican reggae, and rock, which has profoundly influenced most every genre of popular music worldwide. Rock, country, jazz and hip hop have become an entrenched part of many countries, leading to local varieties like Australian country music, Tanzanian Bongo Flava and Russian rock.

Rock has had a formative influence on popular music, which had the effect of transforming "the very concept of what popular music" is. while Charlie Gillett has argued that rock and roll "was the first popular genre to incorporate the relentless pulse and sheer volume of urban life into the music itself".

The social impacts of American popular music have been felt both within the United States and abroad. Beginning as early as the extravaganzas of the late 19th century, American popular music has been criticized for being too sexually titillating and for encouraging violence, drug abuse and generally immoral behavior.

== See also ==
- Blackface
- Rockabilly
- American Idol
- Christian pop culture
- British Invasion
- Lester S. Levy Collection of Sheet Music
- Traditional pop

== Notes ==
1. Garofalo is an example of starting with Tin Pan Alley, in a chapter that also contains the coverage of ragtime
2. Ewen is an example, covering national ballads and patriotic songs, folk music, songs of the Negro, minstrel show and its songs and extravaganza to vaudeville
3. Ewen, p. 69. Ewen claims Dan Emmett was a "popular-song composer", then goes on another, and even more significant, was his contemporary, Stephen Foster—America's first major composer, and one of the world's outstanding writers of songs.
4. Clarke, pp. 28–29. Clarke notes the song "Massa's in the Cold Ground" as a clear attempt to sentimentalize slavery, though he notes that many slaves must have loved their masters, on whom they depended for everything. Clarke also notes that songs like "Nelly Was a Lady" describe the black experience as ordinary human feelings; they are people as real as the characters in Shakespeare.
5. Ewen, p. 81. When Milly Cavendish stepped lightly in front of the footlights, wagged a provocative finger at the men in her audience, and sang in her high-pitched baby voice, "You Naughty, Naughty Men" – by T. Kennick and G. Bicknell—the American musical theater and the American popular song both started their long and active careers in sex exploitation.
6. Ewen, p. 94. Ewen claims New York was the music publishing center of the country by the 1890s, and says the ‘’publishers devised formulas by which songs could be produced with speed and dispatch... Songs were now to be produced from a serviceable matrix, and issued in large quantities: stereotypes for foreign songs, Negro songs, humorous ditties, and, most important of all, sentimental ballads.
7. Ewen, p. 101. Ewen is the source for both "Drill Ye Tarriers" and the nature of coon songs
8. Ewen, p. 101, and Clarke, p. 62. Ewen attributes "New Coon in Town" to Paul Allen, though Clarke attributes it to J. S. Putnam – both agree on the year, 1883
9. Clarke, pg. 95 Clarke dates the golden age as c. 1914–50
10. Clarke, pp. 56–57. Coon songs came out of minstrelsy, and were already established in vaudeville, when all this culminated in ragtime... ragtime may have begun with attempts to imitate the banjo on the keyboard.
11. Ferris, p. 228. Conceived as dance music, and long considered a kind of popular or vernacular music, jazz has become a sophisticated art form that has interacted in significant ways with the music of the concert hall.
12. Clarke, pp. 200–201. From 1935 until after the Second World War a jazz-oriented style was at the centre of popular music for the first time (and the last, so far), as opposed to merely giving it backbone.
13. Garofalo, p. 45. The ukulele and steel guitar were introduced to this country by the Hawaiian string bands that toured the country after Hawaii became a U.S. territory in 1900.
14. Collins, p. 11. In addition, Collins notes that early pseudo-country musicians like Vernon Dalhart who had made their name recording 'country music songs' were not from the hills and hollows or plains and valleys. These recording stars sang both rural music and city music, and most knew more about Broadway than they did about hillbillies. Their rural image was often manufactured for the moment and the dollar. In contrast, Collins later explains, both the Carter Family and Rodgers had rural folk credibility that helped make Peer's recording session such an influential success; it was the Carter Family that was Ralk Peer's tie to the hills and hollows, to lost loves and found faith, but it took Jimmie Rodgers to connect the publisher with some of country music's other beloved symbols—trains and saloons, jail and the blues.
15. Broughton, Viv, and James Attlee. "Devil Stole the Beat" in the Rough Guide to World Music, Volume 2, p. 569: Its seminal figure was a piano player and ex-blues musician by the name of Thomas A. Dorsey (1899–1993), who began composing songs based on familiar spirituals and hymns fused to blues and jazz rhythms. (emphasis in original)
16. Garofalo, p. 72. The first pop vocalist to engender hysteria among his fans (rather than simple admiration or adoration) was an Italian American who refused to anglicize his name—Frank Sinatra, the "Sultan of Swoon".
17. Rolling Stone, pp. 99–100. Ward, Stokes and Tucker call cover versions the ants at the increasingly sumptuous rhythm-and-blues picnic.
18. Szatmary, pp. 69–70. Also a guitar enthusiast who had released a few undistinctive singles on his own label in 1960, Dale worked closely with Leo Fender, the manufacturer of the first mass-produced, solid-body electric guitar and the president of Fender Instruments, to improve the Showman amplifier and to develop the reverberation unit that would give surf music its distinctively fuzzy sound.
19. Rolling Stone, p. 251. Though the Beach Boys' instrumental sound was often painfully thin, the floating vocals, with the Four Freshman-ish harmonies riding over a droned, propulsive burden ("inside outside, U.S.A." in "Surfin' U.S.A."; "rah, rah, rah, rah, sis boom bah" in "Be True to Your School") were rich, dense and unquestionably special.
20. Garofalo, p. 201. Garofalo specifically lists "Roll Over Beethoven" by Chuck Berry, "Long Tall Sally" by Little Richard, "Twist and Shout" by the Isley Brothers, "Money" by Barrett Strong, "Boys" and "Baby It's You" by The Shirelles, "You've Really Got a Hold on Me" by Smokey Robinson and the Miracles and "Chains" by The Cookies.
21. Garofalo, p. 218. The Grateful Dead combined the anticommercial tendencies of white middle-class youth with the mind-altering properties of lyseric acid diethylamide (LSD).
22. Garofalo, p. 448. Garofalo describes a sampler called Sub Pop 200 as an early anthology of the dark, brooding guitar-based sludge that came to be known as grunge.
23. Garofalo, p. 451. From (Glenn Branca's) group they learned to use unconventional tunings to bend otherwise standard pop songs completely out of shape, a trademark of Sonic Youth that, in Seattle, resonated as well as the dark side of their musical vision.
24. Szatmary, p. 285. Recording the songs that would become Nevermind, Nirvana added a melodic, Beatlesque element, which had shaped Cobain, Novoselic, and new drummer Dave Grohl.
25. Szatmary, p. 284. Grunge, growing in the Seattle offices of the independent Sub Pop Records, combined hardcore and metal to top the charts and help define the desperation of a generation.; in context, this presumably refers to Generation X, though that term is not specifically used.
26. Kershaw, p. 167, from the Rough Guide to World Music, Part Two, "Our Life Is Precisely a Song", p. 167. Kershaw specifically notes that North Korea was the only country in which he never heard country music
27. Ewen, p. 3. Of all the contributions made by Americans to world culture—automation and the assembly line, advertising, innumerable devices and gadgets, skyscrapers, supersalesmen, baseball, ketchup, mustard and hot dogs and hamburrgers—one, undeniably native has been taken to heart by the entire world. It is American popular music.
28. Garofalo, p. 94. Suffice it to say, lest we get lost in history, that the music that came to be called rock 'n' roll began in the 1950s as diverse and seldom heard segments of the population achieved a dominant voice in mainstream culture and transformed the very concept of what popular music was.
29. Gillett, p. i, quote from Garofalo, p. 4. Garofalo quotes Gillett as Rock and Roll (sic) was perhaps the first form of popular culture to celebrate without reservation characteristics of city life that had been among the most criticized.
