= Life saver =

Life saver may refer to:

== Life saving ==
- A person who participates in lifesaving
- Lifebuoy, a buoy designed to be thrown to a person in the water to provide buoyancy and prevent drowning
- Personal flotation device, a piece of equipment worn to keep the wearer afloat

== Music ==
=== Songs ===
- "Life Saver", by Chicago from their album Chicago VII
- "Lifesaver" (song), by Emiliana Torrini (2004)
- "Lifesaver", from Guru's 1995 album, Guru's Jazzmatazz, Vol. 2: The New Reality
- "Lifesaver", by Finnish rock band Sunrise Avenue from their album Unholy Ground

=== Other music ===
- Lifesavas, similarly named hip-hop group from Portland, Oregon
- The Lifesaver, a 1974 album by pianist Joe Bonner
- Lifesavers Underground, a Christian rock band

== Other uses ==
- LifeSaver bottle, used to turn dirty/polluted water into drinking water
- Life Savers, a brand of candy
- Life Savers (film), a 1916 film starring Oliver Hardy
- "Lifesaver (poem)", a 1931 poem by Australian writer Elizabeth Riddell
- Life Savers Building, Port Chester, Westchester County, New York, United States
- Dr. Lifesaver, a 2023-2024 Taiwanese television series starring Wang Shih-hsien and Ella Chen
- Operation Lifesaver, a rail safety organization in the United States
- Project Lifesaver, a non-profit organization for locating missing persons with dementia, autism, Down syndrome and other related illnesses

== See also ==
- Life preserver (disambiguation)
