= Sweet and Wonderful =

Studio album by Jean Carn
- Released: July 21, 1981
- Genre: Funk; soul; disco
- Length: 38:29
- Label: TSOP
- Director: Norman Connors; Bill Lacy
- Producer: Norman Connors; McKinley Jackson; Jean Carn; Frank Smith; Bill Bloom

Jean Carn chronology
When I Find You Love (1979)	Sweet and Wonderful (1981)	Trust Me (1982)

Sweet and Wonderful is the fourth studio album by American singer Jean Carn, released in 1981 on the Philadelphia International Records label. It includes the track "Sweet and Wonderful", a duet with Glenn Jones, produced by Norman Connors.

== Overview ==
The album incorporates elements of soul, jazz and R&B, and was produced by Norman Connors with McKinley Jackson, Frank Smith, Bill Bloom and Carn herself.

== Critical reception ==
The album received a positive response from regional newspapers. The Daily Press described Carn's performance as stylistically consistent with her earlier work.

The North County Times commented on the album's arrangements and production.

The Republican referenced the sound as "sophisticated", while reports in the Winston-Salem Journal and Memphis Press-Scimitar noted Carn's promotional performances in those cities, which included songs from the album.

Billboard included Sweet and Wonderful in its Top Album Picks, describing it as "Carn's most impressive album to date, both in terms of performance and repertoire".

== Track listing ==
Side one
No.	Title	Writer(s)	Length
1.	"Bet Your Lucky Star"	Phyllis St. James	4:51
2.	"Don't Say No (To Love)"	Alan Phillips, Brad Ross, Roxanne Seeman	4:19
3.	"Sweet and Wonderful"	Debravon Lewis, Derick Hughes, M. Robinson	3:58
4.	"Love Don't Love Nobody"	Charles B. Simmons, Joseph B. Jefferson	7:07

Side two
No.	Title	Writer(s)	Length
5.	"We Got Some Catchin' Up to Do"	Al Johnson	5:02
6.	"Mystic Stranger"	Phyllis St. James	4:45
7.	"I Just Thought of a Way"	Frank A. Austin Jr., Frank Smith	4:07
8.	"Love (Makes Me Do Foolish Things)"	Brian Holland, Lamont Dozier, Edward Holland	4:00
Total length:			38:09

== Personnel ==
Musicians

- Jean Carn – vocals (all tracks)
- Glenn Jones – vocals (3)
- The Jones Girls – background vocals (1, 2, 5, 6)
- Lilian Tynes – background vocals (3, 4, 8)
- Gerald Garrett – background vocals (8)
- Jim Gilstrap – background vocals (8)
- John Lehman – background vocals (8)
- Eddie Watkins Jr. – bass (1, 2, 6)
- Nathan East – bass (3, 5, 8)
- Jimmy Williams – bass (7)
- James Gadson – drums (1, 2, 6)
- Quinton Joseph – drums (7)
- David T. Walker – guitar (1, 2, 3, 5, 6, 8)
- Wah Wah Watson – guitar (1, 2, 6)
- Paul Jackson Jr. – guitar (1, 2, 5, 6)
- Marlo Henderson – guitar (3, 4, 5, 8)
- Darnell Jordan – guitar (7)
- Dennis Harris – guitar (7)
- Sonny Burke – keyboards (1, 2, 3, 4, 6)
- Clarence McDonald – keyboards (5, 8)
- McKinley Jackson – piano (3, 4, 5, 8)
- Frank Smith – piano (7)
- Bill Bloom – piano (7)
- Paul Fox – synthesizer (5, 8)
- Don Myrick – saxophone (1, 2, 8)
- George Bohanon – horns
- Paulinho da Costa – percussion (1, 2, 3, 6)
- Munyungo Jackson – percussion (5, 8)
- David Cruse – percussion (7)
- Benjamin Barrett – strings (1, 2, 3, 4, 6)
- Harry Bluestone – concertmaster (1, 4, 6)

Technical

- Norman Connors – producer (1, 2, 3, 4, 6), director (1, 3, 4, 6)
- McKinley Jackson – producer (7, 8), arranger (1, 6, 8)
- Jean Carn – producer (8)
- Frank Smith – producer (7), arranger (7)
- Bill Bloom – producer (7), arranger (7)
- Bill Lacy – director (7)
- Jackson Schwartz – engineer (3, 4, 5, 6)
- Peter Humphreys – engineer (5, 7)
- Phil Moores – assistant engineer (5, 8)
- Vincent Warsavage – assistant engineer (5)
- Michael Tarsia – assistant engineer (7)
- Nimitr Sarikananda – mastering
