= The Unifics =

American soul group

- Johnson, Fauntleroy, Cook and Worthington

Background information
- Origin: Washington D.C., United States
- Genres: Soul
- Years active: 1966–1972
- Label: Kapp Records
- Past members: Al Johnson; Michel Ward; Greg Cook; Harold Worthington; Marvin Brown; Tom Fauntleroy

The Unifics were an American soul group from Washington, D.C.

== History ==
In 1966 a group of students at Washington D.C.'s Howard University formed the group Al & the Vikings. Consisting of singer/songwriter Al Johnson, Robert Hayes, George Roland, Marvin Brown and Thomas Fauntleroy. The group changed its name during its first year to the Unique Five and later to the Unifics. Known for their smooth harmonies and their dapper attire (including their trademark white gloves, black light effects and strobe light excitement), the Unifics soon gathered a large following in the D.C. area and began to attract attention elsewhere.

The group, with Johnson as lead singer, scored three hits on the Billboard Hot 100 in 1968 and 1969 for the Kapp Records label. The first, "Court of Love" climbed to #25, but reached #3 on the US Billboard R&B chart. The follow-up, "The Beginning of My End" got to #36 on the Hot 100 and #9 R&B. Two further releases in 1969 reached the R&B chart. The group's debut album was issued in 1968.

Michael Ward and Hal Worthington sang on the original album, replacing Marvin Brown and Thomas Fauntleroy, then left the group in 1970. They were briefly replaced by the original members Marvin Brown and Tom Fauntleroy. By 1972, the group has disbanded.

In 2005, three decades after the Unifics called it quits, Johnson and Fauntleroy decided to resurrect the group and recruited Newport News, Virginia veteran singers Charlie Lockhart and Garrett Hall to complete the quartet. Then, at the end of 2005, they self-released Unifics Return, with Marvin Brown filling in for Garrett Hall and the first Unifics album in over three decades.

Member Al Johnson had a briefly successful solo career in the 1980s and worked with Norman Connors, Jean Carn, The Whispers, Sharon Redd, Gayle Adams and Special Delivery. Al Johnson died on October 26, 2013, at the age of 65.

After Johnson's death, Fauntleroy opted to retire from performing and work as the band's choreographer/manager. He later went into full retirement. The band announced that Hall and Lockhart would be joined in a new line-up by tenor Ned Harris and baritone Bruce Justice.

Greg Cook died from pancreatic cancer on July 8, 2023, at the age of 72.

== Discography ==
=== Albums ===
- Sittin' in at the Court of Love (Kapp Records, 1968)
- Unifics Return (Somodo Records, 2005)

=== Singles ===
Year	Title	Label	Chart positions		
Year	Title	Label	US Hot 100	US R&B	CAN
1968	"Court of Love"	Kapp	25	3	13
1969	"The Beginning of My End"	Kapp	36	9	44
1969	"It's a Groovy World!"	Kapp	97	27	88
1969	"Toshisumasu"	Kapp	—	36	—
1969	"Got To Get You"	Kapp	—	—	—
1971	"Dawn Of A New Day"	Fountain	—	—	—
"—" denotes releases that did not chart.
