= Take It to the Limit (Norman Connors album) =

Studio album by Norman Connors
- Released: 1980
- Genres: Soul; R&B
- Length: 32:55
- Label: Arista
- Producers: Norman Connors; Jean Carn; Gerald Roberts

Norman Connors chronology
Invitation (1979)	Take It to the Limit (1980)	Mr. C (1981)

Singles from Take It to the Limit
- 1. "Take It to the Limit" Released: 1980; 2. "Melancholy Fire" Released: 1980

Take It to the Limit is the tenth studio album by American musician Norman Connors, released in 1980 on Arista Records.

== Critical reception ==
Professional ratings
Review scores
Source	Rating
AllMusic	3/5 stars

Andy Kellman of AllMusic cited that the singles from Take It to the Limit rightfully deserved their modest success. He continued, "...but a small clutch of other gems deserved similar achievements. "I Don't Need Nobody Else," sung by Al Johnson, sparkles brightly, while Adaritha's "Justify" is just as gorgeous as the album's hit singles. One minor disappointment is Leon Ware's set-closing "Everywhere Inside of Me," which falls toward the sappy side. One major dud is a plonking cover of Steely Dan's "Black Cow", which has inexplicably shown up on a number of Connors anthologies. Six out of eight ain't bad by any stretch."

== Chart performance ==
The album peaked at number 145 on the Billboard Top LPs chart and number 30 on the Billboard Top Soul LPs chart. The singles from the album "Take It To The Limit" and "Melancholy Fire" charted and peaked at number 28 and number 20, respectively, on the Billboard R&B chart.

== Track listing ==
Side one

1.	Take It to the Limit	Lead vocals: Adaritha	Writer: Phyllis St. James	3:44
2.	Melancholy Fire	Lead vocals: Glenn Jones	Writer: David DeMarco	3:57
3.	You've Been on my Mind	Lead vocals: Adaritha	Writer: Shelby Flint	4:20
4.	I Don't Need Nobody Else	Lead vocals and backing vocals: Al Johnson	Writer: Lou Courtney	3:49

Side Two

5.	Justify	Vocals: Adaritha	Writer: David Lasley	3:47
6.	Black Cow	Flugelhorn: Freddie Hubbard	Writers: Donald Fagen, Walter Becker	4:55
7.	You Bring Me Joy	Lead Vocals: Adaritha	Writer: David Lasley	3:35
8.	Everywhere Inside Of Me	Lead vocals and backing vocals: Leon Ware	Writer: Leon Ware	4:48

2013 remaster bonus tracks

9.	Melancholy – 7"	3:51
10.	Take It to the Limit – 12"	4:19
11.	Take It to the Limit – 7"	3:35

== Charts ==
Chart (1980)	Peak position
US Billboard 200	145
US Top R&B/Hip-Hop Albums (Billboard)	30

== Personnel ==
The album features several guest musical acts courtesy of their respective record labels.

Columbia Records: Adaritha – vocals, Al Johnson – arrangements & vocals, Freddie Hubbard – flugelhorn and Starship Orchestra – instrumentation

Philadelphia International Records: Jean Carn, The Jones Girls – vocals

Savoy Records: Glenn Jones – vocals

Elektra / Asylum Records: Leon Ware – vocals

Other musicians

- Norman Connors – drums, percussion, vocals
- Alex Brown, Eric Butler, Gwen Matthews, Jim Gilstrap, Marlene Jeter, Vanetta Fields – backing vocals
- David T. Walker, Marlo Henderson – guitar
- Billy McCoy, Bobby Lyles, Sonny Burke – keyboard
- Nathan East, Byron Miller – bass
- James Gadson – drums
- Myungo, Paulinho Da Costa – percussion
- Dorothy Ashby – harp
- Allen Robinson, Sidney Muldrow – French Horn
- Don Myrick, John Kip, Ralph Jones, Bill Green – Saxophone
- Gary Bartz – soprano saxophone, soloist
- Buzzy Jones – tenor saxophone
- Garnet Brown, George Bohanon – trombone
- Bobby Bryant, Eric Butler, Nolan Smith, Oscar Brashear – trumpet

Production

- Ron Averez, Jackson Schwartz – engineer
- Norman Connors, Jean Carn, Gerald Roberts – producer
- John Golden – mastering
- Tony Barboza, Garry Gross – photography
- Donn Davenport – art direction
- Norman Connors – director
- Harry Bluestone – concertmaster (strings)
- Ben Barrett – contractor (strings)
- George Bohanon – contractor (horns)
