= Closer than Close =

Closer than Close may refer to:

- Closer than Close (Rosie Gaines album), 1995
  - "Closer than Close" (Rosie Gaines song), 1997
- Closer than Close (Jean Carn album), 1986
  - "Closer than Close" (Jean Carne song), 1986
- Closer than Close, a song by Peabo Bryson from the 1991 album Can You Stop the Rain
