= Non-passenger and optional vehicle registration plates of Georgia =

The state of Georgia offers many specialty or optional license plates, most at an extra cost to motorists, in lieu of other Georgia license plates. Plates are also issued for non-passenger vehicles, such as trucks, school buses, and governmental vehicles.

== "...on my mind" base ==
A number of types were issued on the 1998-dated "...on my mind" base, using the same general design as the standard passenger plates of the era.

Image	Type	Serial format	Notes
	Agnes Scott College	123AS	
	Albany State University		
	Alpha Kappa Alpha	AB12C	County sticker.
	Alternative Fueled Vehicle	AF123 (wide dies)	
	Amateur Radio	call sign	County sticker.
	Ambulance/Hearse	1234 HB (wide dies)	County sticker.
	Animal Friend	AB12C	County sticker.
	Brenau University		
	Chosin Reservoir Survivor		
	Clark Atlanta University	123CL	
	Columbus State University		
	Court of Appeals Judge	1	
	Delta Sigma Theta sorority	AB12C	County sticker.
	Desert Storm Veteran		Replaced by five types for branches of service.
	Desert Storm Veteran - Air Force		
	Desert Storm Veteran - Army		
	Desert Storm Veteran - Coast Guard		
	Desert Storm Veteran - Marines		
	Desert Storm Veteran - Navy		
	Disabled Person - Motorcycle	A123 ?	Screened wheelchair at left.
	Disabled Person - Passenger	1234 (wide dies); 12345; 1234A	Embossed wheelchair at left.
	Disabled Veteran - Motorcycle	HV12 ?	Red serial, blue legends.
	Disabled Veteran - Passenger	1234 DV (wide dies); 12345 DV	Red serial, blue legends. Issued in pairs; front plate received month sticker but not year sticker.
	Emory University	123EM	
	Firefighter	12 (wide dies); 123 (wide dies); 1CF23; AB12C	
	Foreign Organization	F123 (wide)	
	Former Prisoner of War		
	Fort Valley State University		
	Fund the Fight. Find a Cure. (Breast Cancer)	AB12C	
	Georgia Council of Deliberations	D123B	
	Georgia Southern University	123GS	
	Georgia State University	123ST	
	Georgia Tech	1; 123GT; AB12C	Size of logo reduced during AB12C series.
	Give Wildlife a Chance	WL123; 1 (wide); 12 (wide); 123 (wide); 1234 (wide); 12345; 123AB; 12AB3; 1AB23; AB12C	
	Government - Motorcycle	1234	
	Government - Passenger	12345; 123456	Vertically oriented sticker with type of government — Authority, Board, City, County, or State — placed at left.
	Governor		
	Habitual Violator	12345IA	
	Handicapped Veteran	1234 HV	
	Hobby/Antique Motorcycle	123A	
	Hobby/Antique Vehicle	1234 (wide); 12345; 123456	
	Honorary Consul		
	Korean War Veteran		Replaced by five types for branches of service.
	Korean War Veteran - Air Force		
	Korean War Veteran - Army		
	Korean War Veteran - Coast Guard		
	Korean War Veteran - Marine Corps		
	Korean War Veteran - Navy		
	LaGrange College		
	Lieutenant Governor		
	Life College	1 (wide dies)	
	Low Speed Vehicle	1234LS	
	Medal of Honor	1 (wide dies)	
	Medical College of Georgia		
	Mercer University		
	Morehouse College		
	Morris Brown College		
	Motorcycle	1234 MA; 1234 NA	
	National Guard	1234 (wide dies); 12345	
	North Georgia College		
	Pearl Harbor Survivor	12PL (wide dies); 123PL	
	Personalized - Motorcycle		
	Personalized - Passenger		
	Purple Heart	1234 (wide dies); 12345	
	Reserve - U.S.		Replaced by five types for branches of service.
	Reserve - Air Force	AB12C	
	Army Reserve	1234; 12345; AB12C	
	Coast Guard Reserve		
	Marine Corps Reserve		
	Navy Reserve	1234; AB12C	
	Retired Veteran		Replaced by five types for branches of service.
	Retired Veteran - Air Force	AB12C	
	Retired Veteran - Army	AB12C	
	Retired Veteran - Coast Guard	AB12C	
	Retired Veteran - Marines	AB12C	
	Retired Veteran - Navy	AB12C	
	Savannah State University		
	School Bus	1234 (wide dies)	
	Seminole Clubs	AB12C	
	Shriners Hospitals for Children	S123B (wide dies); S123B	
	Sons of Confederate Veterans	C123V; C12V3	
	Spelman College		
	Spirit of Champions	BZ123; ZZ123; Z12Z3; 123BZ; B1Z23; 12BZ3; 12A3A; 12B3B; 12B3Z; A1B23	
	State Representative		
	State Senator		
	State Trooper	12 (wide dies); 123 (wide dies)	Has the patch of the Georgia State Patrol and the unit number of the car that will relate to the badge number of the Trooper (will have 2 plates on both ends of the car or will be issued a regular government plate if there is no roof number on the car)
	Support Education/Educator	12ABC; AB12C	
	Support Wildlife	AB12C	
	Trailer	1234 AB (wide dies); 12345 AB	
	Transporter - Passenger		
	Trout Unlimited	AB12C	
	Truck or Truck-Tractor - Not-For-Hire - 14,001 to 18,000 lbs.	12345 JA	
	Truck or Truck-Tractor - Not-For-Hire - 18,001 to 26,000 lbs.	12345 JN	
	U.S. Representative		
	U.S. Reserve	1234 (wide dies)	
	U.S. Senator		
	University of Georgia	GA123; 12GA3; AB12C	
	Valdosta State University		
	Vietnam Veteran	1VN (wide dies); 123VN	Replaced by five types for branches of service.
	Vietnam Veteran - Air Force		
	Vietnam Veteran - Army		
	Vietnam Veteran - Coast Guard		
	Vietnam Veteran - Marines		
	Vietnam Veteran - Navy		
	Wildflowers in My Heart	12XA3; 12YA3; AB12C	
	World War II Veteran		Replaced by five types for branches of service.
	World War II Veteran - Army		
	World War II Veteran - Coast Guard		
	World War II Veteran - Marines		
	World War II Veteran - Navy		

== Unique designs ==
During this time period, a number of types were also issued using unique designs:

Image	Type	Serial format	Notes
	50-Mile Bus		Coded by weight?
	Apportioned—For Hire		
	Apportioned—Private		
	Apportioned—Trailer		Issued through 2001.
	Dealer—Motorcycle		
	Dealer—Passenger	DL 0000 (wide dies); DL 00000	
	Distributor—Motorcycle		
	Distributor—Passenger	HT 0000 (wide dies)	
	Limited—10,000 lbs. and less ?		
	Limited—10,001 to 15,000 lbs. ?		
	Limited—15,001 to 20,000 lbs. ?		
	Limited—20,000 lbs. or more ?		
	Manufacturer—Motorcycle		
	Manufacturer—Passenger		
	Permanent Trailer	LE 0000; LE 00000	
	Permanent Trailer—Replacement		
	Permanent Trailer—Apportioned		
	Permanent Trailer—Apportioned—Replacement		
	Temporary—Dealer-Issued		
	Temporary—State-Issued		
	Truck or Truck-Tractor—For-Hire—26,001 to 29,999 lbs.		
	Truck or Truck-Tractor—For-Hire—30,000 to 35,999 lbs.		
	Truck or Truck-Tractor—For-Hire—36,000 to 43,999 lbs.		
	Truck or Truck-Tractor—For-Hire—44,000 to 54,999 lbs.		
	Truck or Truck-Tractor—For-Hire—55,000 to 62,999 lbs.		
	Truck or Truck-Tractor—For-Hire—63,000 lbs. to maximum		
	Truck or Truck-Tractor—For-Hire—Straight Truck		
	Truck or Truck-Tractor—Not-For-Hire—26,001 to 29,999 lbs.		
	Truck or Truck-Tractor—Not-For-Hire—30,000 to 35,999 lbs.		
	Truck or Truck-Tractor—Not-For-Hire—36,000 to 43,999 lbs.		
	Truck or Truck-Tractor—Not-For-Hire—44,000 to 54,999 lbs.		
	Truck or Truck-Tractor—Not-For-Hire—55,000 to 62,999 lbs.		
	Truck or Truck-Tractor—Not-For-Hire—63,000 lbs. to maximum		
	Truck or Truck-Tractor—Not-For-Hire—Straight Truck—Fertilizer/Agricultural		
	Truck or Truck-Tractor—Not-For-Hire—Straight Truck—Private		
	Truck or Truck-Tractor—Not-For-Hire—Straight Truck—Fertilizer/Milk		

== Non-passenger and specialty plates, 1990 to 1996 ==
A number of types were issued on the 1990-dated base, using the same general design as the standard passenger plates of the era.

Image	Type	Serial format	Notes
	Amateur Radio	call sign	
	Ambulance/Hearse	HB 1234	
	Disabled Person - Passenger	1234 (wide dies); 12345	
	Firefighter	12 (wide dies); 1234 (wide dies)	
	Foreign Organization	12 (wide dies)	
	Georgia Southern University	1234 (wide dies)	
	Georgia State University	1234	
	Georgia Tech	123 (wide dies); 1234 (wide dies)	
	Government - Passenger	1234 (wide dies); 12345; 123456	
	Handicapped Veteran	HV0000 (wide dies); HV 0000 (wide dies)	
	Hobby/Antique Vehicle	123 (wide dies); 1234 (wide dies); 12345	
	Light Truck	QA 12345	
	Medal of Honor	1 (wide dies)	
	Mercer University	123 (wide dies)	
	Motorcycle	M/A 1234	
	National Guard	1234 (wide dies)	
	North Georgia College	123 (wide dies)	
	Pearl Harbor Survivor	12 (wide dies)	
	Personalized - Passenger	various	
	Purple Heart	123 (wide dies); 1234 (wide dies)	
	Reserve - U.S.		
	Savannah State College		
	School Bus		
	Southern Tech		
	State Representative		
	State Senator		
	State Trooper		
	Truck		
	University of Georgia		
	Valdosta State University		

During this time period, a number of plates were issued using unique designs.

Image	Type	Serial format	Notes
	50-Mile Bus		Coded by weight?
	Apportioned - For Hire		
	Apportioned - Private		
	Apportioned - Trailer		Issued through 2001.
	Centennial Olympic Games	000; 0000; 00000; 000AA; 00AA0; 0AA00	
	Dealer - Motorcycle		Annual plates.
	Dealer - Passenger		Annual plates.
	Distributor - Motorcycle		
	Distributor - Passenger		
	Limited - 10,000 lbs. and less ?		
	Limited - 10,001 to 15,000 lbs. ?		
	Limited - 15,001 to 20,000 lbs. ?		
	Limited - 20,000 lbs. or more ?		
	Manufacturer - Motorcycle		
	Manufacturer - Passenger		
	1996 Paralympics	0000; 00000; 000AA	
	Permanent Trailer	LE 0000; LE 00000	County sticker.
	Permanent Trailer - Replacement		
	Permanent Trailer - Apportioned		
	Permanent Trailer - Apportioned - Replacement		
	Truck or Truck-Tractor - For-Hire - 26,001 - 29,999 lbs.		
	Truck or Truck-Tractor - For-Hire - 30,000 - 35,999 lbs.		
	Truck or Truck-Tractor - For-Hire - 36,000 - 43,999 lbs.		
	Truck or Truck-Tractor - For-Hire - 44,000 - 54,999 lbs.		
	Truck or Truck-Tractor - For-Hire - 55,000 - 62,999 lbs.		
	Truck or Truck-Tractor - For-Hire - 63,000 lbs. to maximum		
	Truck or Truck-Tractor - For-Hire - Straight Truck		
	Truck or Truck-Tractor - Not-For-Hire - 26,001 - 29,999 lbs.		
	Truck or Truck-Tractor - Not-For-Hire - 30,000 - 35,999 lbs.		
	Truck or Truck-Tractor - Not-For-Hire - 36,000 - 43,999 lbs.		
	Truck or Truck-Tractor - Not-For-Hire - 44,000 - 54,999 lbs.		
	Truck or Truck-Tractor - Not-For-Hire - 55,000 - 62,999 lbs.		
	Truck or Truck-Tractor - Not-For-Hire - 63,000 lbs. to maximum		
	Truck or Truck-Tractor - Not-For-Hire - Straight Truck - Fertilizer/Agricultural		
	Truck or Truck-Tractor - Not-For-Hire - Straight Truck - Private		
	Truck or Truck-Tractor - Not-For-Hire - Straight Truck - Fertilizer/Milk		

== 1983 to 1989 ==
A number of types were issued on the 1983-dated base, using the same general design as the standard passenger plates of the era.

Image	Type	Serial format	Highest issued	Notes
	Government - Motorcycle			
	Government - Passenger			
	Light Truck			
	Motorcycle			
	State Representative			
	Trailer			

During this time period, a number of plates were issued using unique designs.

Image	Type	Serial format	Highest issued	Notes
	Albany State College			
	Emory University			
	Georgia Southern University			
	Georgia State University			
	Georgia Tech			
	Handicapped Veteran			
	Manufacturer			
	Mercer University			
	National Guard			
	University of Georgia			
	Wesleyan College			
	Young Harris College			

== December 2003 to present ==
The state streamlined the ever-growing number of limited-issuance plates by instituting two-letter prefixes for almost all types other than standard passenger plates.

For most types, the serial format progresses after the two-letter prefixes in the following sequence: 0, 00, 000, 0000, 000A, 00A0, 0A00, 00AA, 0AAA, and 0AA0.

Many of these plate types first appeared on the www.GEORGIA.gov base in December 2003 or later, but beginning in the first quarter of 2007, some types began transitioning to the GEORGIA.gov base, with nearly all types having made the transition by the first quarter of 2008. On the new base, the county sticker box and remaining (right) year sticker box were removed.

Prefix	Type	Serial format	Serials issued	Transition to GEORGIA.gov base	Notes
AF	Alternative Fueled Vehicle	AFxxxx	AF0001 to AF0500	Manufacture began by February 4, 2008.	
AI	Habitual Violator	AIxxxxx	AI00001 to AI00257	By August 2008, between AI00030 and AI00257.	
AL	Albany State University		AL1 to AL1208	Manufacture began by January 7, 2008, but no issued plates yet observed.	
AQ	Armstrong Atlantic State University		AQ1 to AQ2	Manufacture began by February 4, 2008, but no issued plates yet observed.	First issued 2005.
AS	Agnes Scott College		AS1 to AS745		
BC	Fight Breast Cancer		BC1 to BC6P43	Manufacture began by January 7, 2008; first observed July 22. Between BC2J19 and BC7L51.	
BR	Brenau University		BR1 to BR765	Manufacture began by January 7, 2008, but no issued plates yet observed.	
BV	Berry College		BV1 to BV621	Manufacture began by January 7, 2008, but no issued plates yet observed.	
BW, BQ	Support Wildlife		BW1 to BQ2KAY		Prefix changed from BW to BQ following BW99ZZ, but BQ0AAA followed BQ99ZZ.
CA	Court of Appeals Judge		CA1	New base began by February 4, 2008, but no issued plates yet observed.	
CB	Choose Life		CB1 to CB3666	Issued only on GEORGIA.gov base.	First issued by October 4, 2007.
CC	Columbus State University		CC1 to CC716	Manufacture began by January 7, 2008, but no issued plates yet observed.	
CF	Firefighter		CF1 to CF962D	In June 2007, between CF862B and CF368C.	
CR	Joanna McAfee Childhood Cancer Foundation		CR1 to CR1953	Issued only on GEORGIA.gov base.	Application period was January 1, 2007 through December 31, 2008. First issued by October 20, 2007.
CU	Clemson University	CU xxx, CUxxxx	CU 1 to CU1157	Issued only on GEORGIA.gov base.	First issued by at least December 31, 2007. Sponsor is Atlanta Clemson Club.
CT	Cat			Issued only on GEORGIA.gov base.	
CV	Sons of Confederate Veterans		CV1 to CV8715	In June 2007, between CV8066 and CV8715.	
CY	Motorcycle	CYx xxx	CY0 001 to CY5 UVG	In June 2007, between CY1 GDR and CY1 HLY. Starting between CY4 EHR and CY2 EYH, plates before the transition lack the debossed left sticker box.	
DA	BlazeSports Georgia		DA1 to DA601B	Manufacture began by February 4, 2008, but no issued plates yet observed.	Purple serials.
DC	Animal Friend		DC1 to DC0P02	Manufacture began by January 7, 2008; first observed September 22, 2008. Between DC8M41 and DC2N02.	
DF	Manufacturer—Passenger	DF xxxxx	DF 0001A to DF 1841A	By March 14, 2008, between DF 0163A and DF 1812A.	Began with DF 0000A series.
DL	New Car Dealer / New Vehicle Dealer	DL xxxxx	DL 0001A to DL 6159C	By January 4, 2008, between DL 3231B and DL 7438B. Type designation changed from "NEW CAR DEALER" TO "NEW VEHICLE DEALER".	Began with DL 0000A series. Red background with white serial and legends.
DL	Trailer Dealer	DL xxxxx	DL 00001 to DL 80512		Orange background.
DL	Used Car Dealer / Used Vehicle Dealer	DL xxxxx	DL 00A01 to DL 33E55	By January 4, 2008, between DL 70C44 and DL 34D86. Type designation changed from "USED CAR DEALER" TO "USED VEHICLE DEALER."	Began with DL 00A00 series. Tan background.
DM	Dealer—Motorcycle	DM xxxx	DM 001A to DM 215A		Began with DM 000A series.
DP PD	Disabled Person—Passenger		DP0001 to DP5QC4; PD0001 to PD39F6	In late March 2007, between DP1SAY and DP2SHK. Initial GEORGIA.gov plates replaced county sticker box with screened "DISABLED PERSON" legend before reverting to county sticker box with no recessed well.	Prefix changed to PD following DP9ZZ9 series.
DV	Disabled Veteran—Passenger	DV xxxx	DV 0001 to DV 914I	In July 2007, between DV 529H and DV 116I.	Issued in pairs.
DZ	Distributor—Motorcycle	DZ xxxx	DZ 001A to DZ 076A		Began with DZ 000A series.
EA	Forest Product Truck-Tractor	EA xxxx	EA 0001? to EA 6681		
ED	Support Education		ED1 to ED1I11	In June 2007, between ED81V9 and ED99W9.	
ED	Educator		ED1 to ED1I11	In June 2007, between ED81V9 and ED99W9.	
EF	Preserve Georgia		EF1 to EF1925	Issued only on GEORGIA.gov base.	First issued by February 8, 2008.
EM	Emory University		EM1 to EM3218	By December 31, 2007, between EM1894 and EM1940.	
EU	Emergency Medical Technician		EU1 to EU1130	Issued only on GEORGIA.gov base.	First issued by October 17, 2007.
FA	Forest Product Truck	FA xxxx	FA 0001? to FA 1251		
FG	Foreign Organization		FG1 to FG10		Issued in pairs.
FH	Agriculture		FH1 to FH1485	Issued only on GEORGIA.gov base.	Application period was January 1, 2007 to December 31, 2008. Issued by at least May 16, 2008.
FP	Former P.O.W.		FP1 to FP709		
FV	Fort Valley State University		FV1 to FV1444	Manufacture began by January 7, 2008; first observed late July 2008. Between FV1312 and FV1444.	
GA	University of Georgia		GA1 to GA22AQ	In March 2007, between GA15W2 and GA30W7.	
GC	Georgia College & State University		GC1 to GC14	Issued only on GEORGIA.gov base, starting in late 2008 or early 2009.	
GE	Georgia equine industry		GE1 to GE776	Issued only on GEORGIA.gov base. First observed October 16, 2008.	
GL	Spay and Neuter		GL1 to GL0P71	Manufacture began by January 7, 2008, but no issued plates yet observed.	
GM	Government—Motorcycle	GMx xxx	GM0 001 to GM0 100		
GR	Georgia Association of Realtors		GR1 to GR1197	Issued only on GEORGIA.gov base.	Application period was 1/1/07-12/31/08. Tag clerk stated first issued February 7, 2008.
GS	Georgia Southern University		GS1 to GS2773	Manufacture began by January 7, 2008, but no issued plates yet observed.	
GT	Georgia Institute of Technology		GT1 to GT530H	In July 2007, between GT576D and GT107E.	GT65 1 also observed on GEORGIA.gov base.
GV	Government—Passenger	GVxxxxx	GV00001 to GV0240A		
Hx	Truck or Truck-Tractor—For-Hire				
HF	26,001 to 30,000 lb		HF0001? to HF1283		
HG	30,001 to 36,000 lb		HF0001? to HG3014		
HH	36,001 to 44,000 lb		HF0001? to HH1931		
HI	44,001 to 55,000 lb		HF0001? to HI1255		
HJ	55,001 to 63,000 lb		HF0001? to HJ1000		
HK	63,001 lb to maximum		HF0001? to HK8989	In June 2007, between HK8602 and HK8989.	
HX	Straight Truck		HF0001? to HX862B	By March 13, 2008, between HX1000 and HX352A.	
HA	Hobby/Antique Vehicle		HA0001 to HA8PVJ	By November 30, 2007, between HA1HJC and HA8JWZ.	"HA8" to no longer be used; high with that combination is HA8PVJ.
HB	Ambulance/Hearse	HB xxxxx	HB 00001 to HB 00140		
HC	Honorary Consul		HC1 to HC30		Issued in pairs.
HD	Hobby/Antique Motorcycle	HDxxx	HD001? to HD16W		
HM	Disabled Veteran—Motorcycle	HM xxxx	(not observed)	Manufacture on new base began by February 4, 2008, but no issued plates yet observed.	
HT	Distributor—Passenger	HT xxxxx	HT 0001A to HT 3000A	By February 24, 2008, between HT 1903A and HT 2756A.	Began with HT 0000A series. December expiration previously screened when left sticker box was present, but now expiration is staggered.
HU	Give Wildlife a Chance (Hummingbird)		HU1 to HU95JZ		
HW	Children's Healthcare of Atlanta		HW1 to present		
Ix	Apportioned				
IC	For Hire		IC0001? to IC4B69		Between IC22M3 and IC4B69.
IP	Private		IP0001? to IP533L	Unknown whether has transitioned. Confirmed high on www.GEORGIA.gov base is IP345G.	
IR	Restricted?		IR0001? to IR1976		
Jx	Truck or Truck-Tractor—Not-For-Hire				
JA	14,001 to 18,000 lb		JA0001? to JA00Y1	Manufacture began by March 21, 2008; first observed August 2008. Between JA1000 and JA576P.	
JN	18,001 to 26,000 lb		JN1A21	By March 11, 2008, between JN13V1 and JN1A11.	
JG	Georgia Junior Golf Foundation		JG1 to JG100	Issued only on GEORGIA.gov base.	
JQ	Augusta State University		JQ1 to JQ2	Manufacture began by February 4, 2008, but no issued plates yet observed.	First issued 2006.
KA	Korean War Veteran—Army		KA1 to KA100	Manufacture began by March 21, 2008, but no issued plates yet observed.	
KF	Korean War Veteran—Air Force		KF1 to KF100	Manufacture began by March 21, 2008, but no issued plates yet observed.	
KG	Korean War Veteran—Coast Guard		KG1 to KG100	Manufacture began by February 4, 2008, but no issued plates yet observed.	
KM	Korean War Veteran—Marine Corps		KM1 to KM100	Manufacture began by February 4, 2008, but no issued plates yet observed.	
KN	Korean War Veteran—Navy		KN1 to KN100	Manufacture began by March 21, 2008, but no issued plates yet observed.	
KU	Kennesaw State University		KU1 to KU565	Issued only on GEORGIA.gov base. First observed July 31, 2008.	
Lx	Limited				
LA	10,000 lb and less?		LA1000		
LB	10,001 to 15,000 lb?		LB1000		
LC	15,001 to 20,000 lb?		LC1000		
LD	20,000 lb to maximum?		LD1000		
LC	LaGrange College		LC388		
LE	Permanent Trailer	LE xxxxx	LE 9205D	n/a	All-embossed black on yellow.
LF	Life University				
LS	Low Speed Vehicle		LS1	Manufacture on GEORGIA.gov base began by January 7, 2008, but no issued plates yet observed.	
LX	50 Mile Bus?		LX1059		
LZ	50 Mile Bus (? lb to maximum)		LZ1032		
MB	Morris Brown College		MB17		
MD	Disabled Person—Motorcycle	MDxxx	MD105	Manufacture began by March 21, 2008, but no issued plates yet observed.	
ME	Mercer University		ME1925	Manufacture began by January 7, 2008, but no issued plates yet observed.	
MG	Medical College of Georgia		MG411	Manufacture began by January 7, 2008, but no issued plates yet observed.	
MR	Morehouse College		MR1012	Manufacture began by January 7, 2008, but no issued plates yet observed.	
NG	North Georgia College and State University		NG99	Manufacture began by January 7, 2008, but no issued plates yet observed.	
NK	NASCAR		NK2178 to NK4024	Introduced in June 2007 on GEORGIA.gov base.	Serial is flat, printed in font used on Mississippi's special-issue plates. One generic NASCAR design as well as separate designs for each driver. 28 types reduced to 22 types—some driver-specific types no longer issued and other new types added—by February 10, 2008.
NK	Kurt Busch		NK2178 to NK4024	Introduced in June 2007 on GEORGIA.gov base.	Serial is flat, printed in font used on Mississippi's special-issue plates. One generic NASCAR design as well as separate designs for each driver. 28 types reduced to 22 types—some driver-specific types no longer issued and other new types added—by February 10, 2008.
NK	Dale Earnhardt		NK2178 to NK4024	Introduced in June 2007 on GEORGIA.gov base.	Serial is flat, printed in font used on Mississippi's special-issue plates. One generic NASCAR design as well as separate designs for each driver. 28 types reduced to 22 types—some driver-specific types no longer issued and other new types added—by February 10, 2008.
NK	Dale Earnhardt Legacy		NK2178 to NK4024	Introduced in June 2007 on GEORGIA.gov base.	Serial is flat, printed in font used on Mississippi's special-issue plates. One generic NASCAR design as well as separate designs for each driver. 28 types reduced to 22 types—some driver-specific types no longer issued and other new types added—by February 10, 2008.
NK	Mark Martin		NK2178 to NK4024	Introduced in June 2007 on GEORGIA.gov base.	Serial is flat, printed in font used on Mississippi's special-issue plates. One generic NASCAR design as well as separate designs for each driver. 28 types reduced to 22 types—some driver-specific types no longer issued and other new types added—by February 10, 2008.
NK	David Ragan		NK2178 to NK4024	Introduced in June 2007 on GEORGIA.gov base.	Serial is flat, printed in font used on Mississippi's special-issue plates. One generic NASCAR design as well as separate designs for each driver. 28 types reduced to 22 types—some driver-specific types no longer issued and other new types added—by February 10, 2008.
NK	Kasey Kahne		NK2178 to NK4024	Introduced in June 2007 on GEORGIA.gov base.	Serial is flat, printed in font used on Mississippi's special-issue plates. One generic NASCAR design as well as separate designs for each driver. 28 types reduced to 22 types—some driver-specific types no longer issued and other new types added—by February 10, 2008.
NK	David Stremme		NK2178 to NK4024	Introduced in June 2007 on GEORGIA.gov base.	Serial is flat, printed in font used on Mississippi's special-issue plates. One generic NASCAR design as well as separate designs for each driver. 28 types reduced to 22 types—some driver-specific types no longer issued and other new types added—by February 10, 2008.
NK	Tony Stewart		NK2178 to NK4024	Introduced in June 2007 on GEORGIA.gov base.	Serial is flat, printed in font used on Mississippi's special-issue plates. One generic NASCAR design as well as separate designs for each driver. 28 types reduced to 22 types—some driver-specific types no longer issued and other new types added—by February 10, 2008.
NK	Greg Biffle		NK2178 to NK4024	Introduced in June 2007 on GEORGIA.gov base.	Serial is flat, printed in font used on Mississippi's special-issue plates. One generic NASCAR design as well as separate designs for each driver. 28 types reduced to 22 types—some driver-specific types no longer issued and other new types added—by February 10, 2008.
NK	Matt Kenseth		NK2178 to NK4024	Introduced in June 2007 on GEORGIA.gov base.	Serial is flat, printed in font used on Mississippi's special-issue plates. One generic NASCAR design as well as separate designs for each driver. 28 types reduced to 22 types—some driver-specific types no longer issued and other new types added—by February 10, 2008.
NK	Elliott Sadler		NK2178 to NK4024	Introduced in June 2007 on GEORGIA.gov base.	Serial is flat, printed in font used on Mississippi's special-issue plates. One generic NASCAR design as well as separate designs for each driver. 28 types reduced to 22 types—some driver-specific types no longer issued and other new types added—by February 10, 2008.
NK	Jeff Gordon		NK2178 to NK4024	Introduced in June 2007 on GEORGIA.gov base.	Serial is flat, printed in font used on Mississippi's special-issue plates. One generic NASCAR design as well as separate designs for each driver. 28 types reduced to 22 types—some driver-specific types no longer issued and other new types added—by February 10, 2008.
NK	Jamie McMurray		NK2178 to NK4024	Introduced in June 2007 on GEORGIA.gov base.	Serial is flat, printed in font used on Mississippi's special-issue plates. One generic NASCAR design as well as separate designs for each driver. 28 types reduced to 22 types—some driver-specific types no longer issued and other new types added—by February 10, 2008.
NK	Kevin Harvick		NK2178 to NK4024	Introduced in June 2007 on GEORGIA.gov base.	Serial is flat, printed in font used on Mississippi's special-issue plates. One generic NASCAR design as well as separate designs for each driver. 28 types reduced to 22 types—some driver-specific types no longer issued and other new types added—by February 10, 2008.
NK	Jeff Burton		NK2178 to NK4024	Introduced in June 2007 on GEORGIA.gov base.	Serial is flat, printed in font used on Mississippi's special-issue plates. One generic NASCAR design as well as separate designs for each driver. 28 types reduced to 22 types—some driver-specific types no longer issued and other new types added—by February 10, 2008.
NK	Clint Bowyer		NK2178 to NK4024	Introduced in June 2007 on GEORGIA.gov base.	Serial is flat, printed in font used on Mississippi's special-issue plates. One generic NASCAR design as well as separate designs for each driver. 28 types reduced to 22 types—some driver-specific types no longer issued and other new types added—by February 10, 2008.
NK	Ryan Newman		NK2178 to NK4024	Introduced in June 2007 on GEORGIA.gov base.	Serial is flat, printed in font used on Mississippi's special-issue plates. One generic NASCAR design as well as separate designs for each driver. 28 types reduced to 22 types—some driver-specific types no longer issued and other new types added—by February 10, 2008.
NK	Juan Pablo Montoya		NK2178 to NK4024	Introduced in June 2007 on GEORGIA.gov base.	Serial is flat, printed in font used on Mississippi's special-issue plates. One generic NASCAR design as well as separate designs for each driver. 28 types reduced to 22 types—some driver-specific types no longer issued and other new types added—by February 10, 2008.
NK	Reed Sorenson		NK2178 to NK4024	Introduced in June 2007 on GEORGIA.gov base.	Serial is flat, printed in font used on Mississippi's special-issue plates. One generic NASCAR design as well as separate designs for each driver. 28 types reduced to 22 types—some driver-specific types no longer issued and other new types added—by February 10, 2008.
NK	Jimmie Johnson		NK2178 to NK4024	Introduced in June 2007 on GEORGIA.gov base.	Serial is flat, printed in font used on Mississippi's special-issue plates. One generic NASCAR design as well as separate designs for each driver. 28 types reduced to 22 types—some driver-specific types no longer issued and other new types added—by February 10, 2008.
NK	Michael Waltrip		NK2178 to NK4024	Introduced in June 2007 on GEORGIA.gov base.	Serial is flat, printed in font used on Mississippi's special-issue plates. One generic NASCAR design as well as separate designs for each driver. 28 types reduced to 22 types—some driver-specific types no longer issued and other new types added—by February 10, 2008.
NK	Dale Earnhardt Jr.		NK2178 to NK4024	Introduced in June 2007 on GEORGIA.gov base.	Serial is flat, printed in font used on Mississippi's special-issue plates. One generic NASCAR design as well as separate designs for each driver. 28 types reduced to 22 types—some driver-specific types no longer issued and other new types added—by February 10, 2008.
NK	Carl Edwards		NK2178 to NK4024	Introduced in June 2007 on GEORGIA.gov base.	Serial is flat, printed in font used on Mississippi's special-issue plates. One generic NASCAR design as well as separate designs for each driver. 28 types reduced to 22 types—some driver-specific types no longer issued and other new types added—by February 10, 2008.
NK	Richard Petty		NK2178 to NK4024	Introduced in June 2007 on GEORGIA.gov base.	Serial is flat, printed in font used on Mississippi's special-issue plates. One generic NASCAR design as well as separate designs for each driver. 28 types reduced to 22 types—some driver-specific types no longer issued and other new types added—by February 10, 2008.
NT	National Guard		NT? to NT666B	Manufacture began by January 7, 2008; first observed March 13, 2008. Transitioned between NT208A and NT666B.	
OU	Oglethorpe University		OU1 to OU119	Issued only on new base without sticker boxes, by at least January 19, 2009.	
Px	Truck or Truck-Tractor—Not-For-Hire				
PERM/TRAILER	Transporter				
PF	26,001 to 30,000 lb		PF9055		
PG	30,001 to 36,000 lb		PG8768		
PH	36,001 to 44,000 lb		PH1000		
PI	44,001 to 55,000 lb		PI8877		
PJ	55,001 to 63,000 lb		PJ1000		
PK	63,001 lb to maximum	By October 30, 2008, between PK7627 and PK078A.	PK0001? to PK087A		
PW	Straight Truck—Fertilizer/Agricultural		PW1000		
PX	Straight Truck—Private		PX485J		
PZ	Truck—Tractor—Fertilizer/Milk		PZ1000		
PB	School Bus		PB5400		
PL	Pearl Harbor Survivor		PL30	Manufacture began by January 7, 2008, but no issued plates yet observed.	
PO	Transporter—Manufacturer?		PO 0002A; ?	By January 2009, between PO 0002A and ?.	
RA	U.S. Reserves—Army		RA3851	Manufacture began by January 7, 2008, but no issued plates yet observed.	
RD	Share the Road		RD1488 to RD9518	By late June 2007, between RD1488 and RD1939.	
RF	U.S. Reserves—Air Force		RF2602	Manufacture began by January 7, 2008, but no issued plates yet observed.	
RG	U.S. Reserve—Coast Guard		RG100	Manufacture began by January 7, 2008, but no issued plates yet observed.	
RI	Rotary International		RI346	First type issued on GEORGIA.gov base.	Plates through at least RI151 have debossed left sticker box.
RM	U.S. Reserves—Marine Corps		RM722	Manufacture began by January 7, 2008, but no issued plates yet observed.	
RN	U.S. Reserves—Navy		RN460	Manufacture began by January 7, 2008, but no issued plates yet observed.	
RQ	Race Car Hall of Fame		RQ1 to RQ591	Manufacture began by January 7, 2008, but no issued plates yet observed.	
RS	U.S. Reserves		RS1992	Manufacture began by January 7, 2008, but no issued plates yet observed.	
SA	Desert Storm Veteran—Army		SA218	Manufacture began by March 21, 2008, but no issued plates yet observed.	
SF	Desert Storm Veteran—Air Force		SF000	Manufacture began by March 21, 2008, but no issued plates yet observed.	
SG	Desert Storm Veteran—Coast Guard		SG100	Manufacture began by January 7, 2008, but no issued plates yet observed.	
SJ	Georgia Soccer Association		SJ600		
SM	Desert Storm Veteran—Marine Corps		SM100	Manufacture began by January 7, 2008, but no issued plates yet observed.	
SN	Desert Storm Veteran—Navy		SN80	Manufacture began by January 7, 2008, but no issued plates yet observed.	
SP	Spelman College		SP1983 to SP2269	By November 23, 2007, between SP1983 and SP2269.	
SR	State Representative	SR + district number (1–180) + possible suffix letter	n/a	Manufacture began by January 7, 2008, but no issued plates yet observed.	
SS	State Senator	SS + district number (1-56) + possible suffix letter	n/a		
ST	Georgia State University		ST1993	Began by late 2007.	
SV	Savannah State University		SV549		
TG	Gold Star Family		TG204	Introduced by July 10, 2007, on GEORGIA.gov base.	
TL		TL xxxxx	TL 86N77		
TU	Trout Unlimited		TU001B		
TZ	Auburn Club		TZ1 to TZ410A	In the first quarter of 2007, between TZ6323 and TZ6883.	
Ux	Unlimited				
UA	10,000 lbs. and less?		UA0000		
UB	10,001 to 15,000 lb?		UB0000		
UC	15,001 to 20,000 lb?		UC1056		
UD	20,000 lb to maximum?		UD1559	By August 4, 2007, between UD1285 and UD1559.	
UF	University of Florida		UF1 to UF3300	Introduced by February 7, 2008, on GEORGIA.gov base.	Dark blue serial and dark blue state name. Sponsor is Atlanta Gator Club.
UW	Wholesale Dealer—Passenger	UW xxxx	UW 1583		White on light blue.
VA	Vietnam Veteran—Army		VA770		
VF	Vietnam Veteran—Air Force		VF176		
VG	Vietnam Veteran—Coast Guard		VG1 to VG100		
VK	Savannah College of Art and Design		VK1 to VK536		
VL	University of Tennessee Alumni Association		VL1 to VL797	Issued only on GEORGIA.gov base.	
VM	Vietnam Veteran—Marine Corps		VM1 to VM100		
VN	Vietnam Veteran—Navy		VN1 to VN100		
VS	Valdosta State University		VS1 to VS100		
WA	World War II Veteran—Army		WA1 to WA85		
WC	Purple coneflower		WC1 to WC8000	Issued only on GEORGIA.gov base.	
WF	Wildflowers in My Heart		WF1 to WF98YZ		
WG	World War II Veteran—Coast Guard				
WL, WI, WD, WX	Give Wildlife a Chance (Eagle)		WL1 to WL99ZZ, WI1 to WI99ZZ, WD1 to WD99ZZ, WX1 to WX8DAI		For WL, WI, and WD, prefix changed when each previous prefix reached 99ZZ after the prefix. WX0AAA followed WX99ZZ.
WM	World War II Veteran—Marine Corps		WM1		
WN	World War II Veteran—Navy		WN1		
WV	Purple Heart		WV1 to WV702A	In June 2007, between WV6894 and WV702A.	
XA	Retired Veteran—Army		XA1 to XA251X	Between XA050M and XA251X	
XF	Retired Veteran—Air Force		XF1 to XF542A		
XG	Retired Veteran—Coast Guard		XG1 to XG100		
XM	Retired Veteran—Marine Corps		XM1 to XM1170		
XN	Retired Veteran—Navy		XN1 to XN2507		
XW	University of West Georgia		WG1 to WG722		
ZP	Purple Heart—Motorcycle	ZPxxx	ZP1 to ZP124		
??	Chosin Reservoir Survivor				
	Blue Star Family				
??	Governor				
??	Lieutenant Governor				
??	Manufacturer—Motorcycle				
??	Medal of Honor				
??	Sheriff				
??	Speaker of the House				
??	Supreme Court Judge				
??	U.S. Representative				
??	U.S. Senator				

=== Current types not displaying a prefix ===
Type	Serial format	Serials issued	Transition to GEORGIA.gov base	Notes
Amateur radio operator	call sign	various		

=== Pending types ===
Suggested prefix	Type	Notes
AB	Abraham Baldwin Agricultural College	
AG	Alzheimer's Association, Georgia Chapter	
AK	Alpha Kappa Alpha	
AN	Angel Flight	
AP	AIDS Survival Project	
AT	African American history	
AT	Appalachian Trail Conservancy of Georgia	
AV	Honoring All Veterans	
BA	Boy Scouts of America	
BB	Cobb County public schools	
BD	Brain-related disorders	
BG	Keep Georgia Beautiful	
BN	Bronze Star	
BP	Beautification projects in Cobb County	
CM	Municipal Clerks of Georgia	
CP	Prevent Child Abuse	
CS	Camp Sunshine	
CW	American Civil War battlefields and historic sites	
DI	Persons with diabetes	
DS	Drive Safe Georgia	
EE	Protect Wild Dolphins	
FF	Atlanta Falcons Foundation	
FP	Foster parenting	
FS	Florida State University	Sponsor is Atlanta Seminole Club.
GB	Garden Club of Georgia	
GD	ALS Association of Georgia	
GF	Global war on terrorism—Operation Enduring Freedom	
GN	Georgia War Veterans' Nursing Home	
GP	Gwinnett County Public School Foundation	
IF	Global War on Terrorism—Operation Iraqi Freedom	
JI	Jekyll Island	
LP	Project Lifesaver	
MG	Maritime history	
MI	Promote Childcare	
NC	University of North Carolina	Sponsor is Alumni Association—Atlanta Chapter.
PC	Cure Kids' Cancer	
PE	School health and physical education programs	
SC	University of South Carolina	Sponsor is Alumni Association—Atlanta Chapter.
TM	Thanks, Mom and Dad	
TS	Support Our Troops	
??	Georgia Center for the Book	
??	Louisiana State University	
??	Stroke awareness	

== See also ==
- Vehicle registration plates of Georgia
