= Black Unity =

Studio album by Pharoah Sanders
- Released: December 8, 1971
- Recorded: November 24, 1971
- Genre: Avant-garde jazz
- Length: 37:21
- Label: Impulse!
- Producer: Lee Young

Pharoah Sanders chronology
Thembi (1971)	Black Unity (1971)	Live at the East (1972)

Black Unity is a composition and album by jazz saxophonist Pharoah Sanders, recorded and released in late 1971. The whole album consists of a single thirty-seven-minute track, which was described by critic Joe S. Harrington as "an exercise in sustained harmonic groove that cannot be beaten" when he listed it at No. 38 on his Top 100 Albums. The compact disc reissue of 1997 unites the two parts as a single track, timed at 37:21.

== Reception ==
Professional ratings
Review scores
Source	Rating
AllMusic	4/5 stars
DownBeat	3.5/5 stars
The Penguin Guide to Jazz Recordings	3.5/4 stars
The Rolling Stone Jazz & Blues Album Guide	3.5/5 stars
Uncut	9/10

In a review for AllMusic, Thom Jurek wrote: "The only cut on the album is 'Black Unity,' over 37 minutes of pure Afro-blue investigation into the black sounds of Latin music, African music, aborigine music, and Native American music, with a groove that was written into the standard three-chord vamp Sanders used, opening up a world of melodic and tonal possibilities while also bringing a couple of stellar talents to the fore... This is a solid, moving piece of work that seals the cracks in Sanders' vocabulary. His arrangement and the staggering of solos into the whole are magnificent. Here was Sanders as he saw himself in the mirror, a mass of contradictions, and the embodiments of the full fury and glory of music in one man."

The authors of The Penguin Guide to Jazz wrote: "Skimpy as to length, but packed with interest. The line-up alone should be tweaking interest already; Garnett, Bonner, McBee and Hart have never enjoyed the celebrity they deserve, and here they contribute to a fascinating collage of sound, dark splashes of colour which never sound virtuosic but which contribute to an intensely vivid and dramatic canvas."

Writing for It's Psychedelic Baby! Magazine, Gustav Janko commented: "In my book, this is the best album by Pharoah Sanders. It is most definitely the rawest I know of him, and probably the less prepared. It is an example of the power of improvisation and the liberty it gives to the performers. It definitely favors a transcendental music, that gets rid of the brain to just let emotions and energy lead. Black Unity is a collective mystic experience and a trip back to the roots of Humanity. This is not only an African music, this is Universal music, Human music, a chant that takes the listener back to the roots of the world."

Saxophonist Shabaka Hutchings, in an article for The Vinyl Factory, wrote: "There is a feeling of the music being both of the sky and of the earth, as above as it is below. There is no way of me quantifying this statement, it is not to be rationalised in terms of logic. It is an intuitive reasoning, powerful for what it symbolises to the listener: that it is open to ancient concepts stretching back to the time of the kemetic civilisation... the title is the answer to the question which hovered over the civil rights movement in America, that lurked in the underbelly of all the anti-colonial movements sweeping Africa during the '70s and is still relevant today. How do we as Black people triumph over a system of white supremacy that has affected even our scope to define the parameters of the 'real'? Pharaoh says it simply and best... Black Unity!"

== Track listing ==
=== Side one ===
No.	Title	Length
1.	"Black Unity (part one)"	18:28

=== Side two ===
No.	Title	Length
1.	"Black Unity (part two)"	18:58

== Personnel ==
- Pharoah Sanders — soprano and tenor saxophone, balafon
- Marvin "Hannibal" Peterson — trumpet
- Carlos Garnett — flute, tenor saxophone
- Joe Bonner — piano
- Stanley Clarke, Cecil McBee — bass
- Norman Connors, Billy Hart — drums
- Lawrence Killian — conga, balafon, talking drum, percussion

== Production ==
- Lee Young — producer
- Tony May — engineer
- Michael Cuscuna — reissue producer
- Erick Labson — remastering
- Hollis King — art direction
- Christine Lee — graphic design
- Chuck Stewart — photography
