= This Is Your Life (Norman Connors album) =

Studio album by Norman Connors
- Released: 1977
- Recorded: 1977
- Studio: Kendun Recorders, Burbank, California
- Genre: Soul, jazz, jazz fusion
- Label: Arista
- Producer: Norman Connors

Norman Connors chronology
Romantic Journey (1977)	This Is Your Life (1977)	Invitation (1979)

Professional ratings
Review scores
Source	Rating
Allmusic	4/5 stars

This Is Your Life is an album by Philadelphia, Pennsylvania jazz drummer Norman Connors and the Starship Orchestra featuring Eleanor Mills. The album charted at number fifteen on the jazz albums chart.

== Track listing ==
1. "Stella" - 3:17 Lead Vocals – James Robinson
2. "This Is Your Life" - 4:13 Lead Vocals - Miss Eleanore Mills
3. "Wouldn't You Like To See" - 3:40 Lead Vocals – Jean Carn
4. "Listen" - 3:51 Lead Vocals – James Robinson
5. "Say You Love Me" - 4:36
6. "Captain Connors" - 3:16
7. "You Make Me Feel Brand New" - 5:45
8. "Butterfly" - 4:58
9. "The Creator" - 7:58

10. "Captain Connors (12" Version)" - 7:22 bonus track on CD

== Personnel ==
- Norman Connors - Drums, Percussion, Timpani, Lead Vocals
- Billy McCoy, Bobby Lyle, Jacques Burvick, Richard Cummings, Richard Tee, Ronnie Coleman - Keyboards
- Charles Fearing, David T. Walker, Jay Graydon, Lee Ritenour, Wah Wah Watson - Guitar
- James Gadson - Drums
- Eddie Watkins, Ben Atkins - Bass
- Mike Boddicker - Oberheim Synthesizer
- Eddie "Bongo" Brown - Congas
- Petro Bass - Percussion
- Kenneth Nash - Congas, Bongos, Cymbal (Paiste Cymbals), Gong (Paiste Gongs), Percussion
- Gary Bartz - Alto Saxophone, Soprano Saxophone
- Pharoah Sanders - Tenor Saxophone
- Ralph Buzzy Jones - Soprano Saxophone
- Benny Powell, Garnett Brown, George Bohanon, George Thacher, Lew McCreary - Trombone
- Charles Moore, Nolan Smith, Jr., Oscar Brashear, Ray Brown, Shunzo Ono - Trumpet
- David Ii, Earle Dumler, Ernie Watts, Fred Jackson, Jr., Terry Harrington, Bill Green - Woodwind
- James Atkinson, Sidney Muldrow - French Horn
- Marimba, Bells Orchestra, Elmira Collins - Vibraphone
- Harry Bluestone - Concertmaster (Strings)
- McKinley Jackson - Conductor
- Jean Carn, Miss Eleanore Mills, James Robinson - Lead and Backing Vocals

== Charts ==
Chart (1978)	Peak position
Billboard Pop Albums	68
Billboard Top Soul Albums	20
Billboard Top Jazz Albums	15

=== Singles ===
Year	Single	Chart positions
Year	Single	US R&B
1978	"This Is Your Life"	31
