= Love in Us All =

Studio album by Pharoah Sanders
- Released: 1974
- Recorded: 1972–73
- Genre: Spiritual jazz
- Length: 40:34
- Label: Impulse!
- Producer: Ed Michel

Pharoah Sanders chronology
Village of the Pharoahs (1973)	Love in Us All (1974)	Elevation (1974)

Love in Us All is an album by American saxophonist and composer Pharoah Sanders, released on the Impulse! label.

== Music ==
The first song, "Love is Everywhere", is an extension of a song first featured on Wisdom Through Music, and starts with a bass vamp and call and response vocal section. It then diverges from this version with a section featuring shakers, bells and tabla. It is a relatively harmonious song cycling through a constant ii-I chord progression. In contrast, the second song "To John" contains intense free jazz.

== Reception ==
Professional ratings
Review scores
Source	Rating
AllMusic	5/5 stars
DownBeat	1.5/5 stars
The Penguin Guide to Jazz Recordings	3/4 stars
The Virgin Encyclopedia of Jazz	3/5 stars

In his AllMusic review, Nathan Bush stated: "Love in Us All consists of two extended compositions. Together, they serve as an aural representation of the way Sanders' music polarized the jazz world at the time". He noted: "in a way, Coltrane himself never created a work as emotionally direct as 'Love Is Everywhere'."

The authors of The Penguin Guide to Jazz Recordings praised "Love Is Everywhere," calling it "lovely stuff," but noted that Sanders was "towards the end of his time at Impulse! and badly needing a fresh direction."

A writer for Billboard wrote: "The double pocket jacket is a waste. The music is not however, with the title tune a paraphrase of Coltrane on soprano sax."

Ted Davis of Paste included "Love Is Everywhere" in his list of "The 10 Best Pharoah Sanders Songs," stating that it "captures his sound at its most wonderfully cosmic, esoteric and enlightening—a perfect distillation of all the things that made him such a singular and unforgettable artist."

== Track listing ==
All compositions by Pharoah Sanders

1. "Love Is Everywhere" - 19:52
2. "To John" - 20:42

== Personnel ==
- Pharoah Sanders - tenor saxophone, soprano saxophone, flute
- Joe Bonner - piano
- James Branch - flute
- Cecil McBee - bass
- Norman Connors - drums
- Lawrence Killian, James Mtume, Badal Roy - percussion
