= Closer than Close (Jean Carne song) =

Single by Jean Carne

from the album Closer than Close
- B-side: "Lucky Charm"
- Released: 1986
- Genre: Soul; R&B
- Length: 5:53 (album version); 4:08 (single version)
- Label: Omni
- Songwriter(s): Brandi Wells; Terry Price
- Producer(s): Grover Washington Jr.

"Closer than Close" is a 1986 R&B ballad by former Norman Connors vocalist Jean Carne. The single was a number-one hit on the U.S. R&B chart for two weeks. "Closer than Close" was written by Terry Price and Brandi Wells and produced by Grover Washington Jr.
