= Romantic Journey =

Studio album by Norman Connors
- Released: 1977
- Recorded: 1977
- Studio: The Sound Labs and United-Western Recorders Hollywood, California
- Genre: Soul, jazz, jazz fusion
- Length: 43:15
- Label: Buddah
- Producer: Skip Drinkwater

Norman Connors chronology
You Are My Starship (1976)	Romantic Journey (1977)	This Is Your Life (1978)

Professional ratings
Review scores
Source	Rating
Allmusic	2.5/5 stars

Romantic Journey is an album released in 1977 by American jazz drummer Norman Connors, from Philadelphia, Pennsylvania. The album charted at number ten on the jazz albums chart.

== Track listing ==
Side one

1. "You Are Everything" (Thom Bell, Linda Creed) – 7:00
  Arranged and conducted by Jerry Peters
  Lead vocals – Eleanore Mills
2. "Once I've Been There" (Phillip Mitchell) – 5:49
  Arranged and conducted by Jerry Peters
  Lead vocals – Phillip Mitchell
3. "Destination Moon" (Phillip Mitchell) – 4:38
  Arranged by Hubert Eaves, Reggie Lucas, and Ian Underwood (synthesizer)
  Lead vocals – Phillip Mitchell
4. "Romantic Journey" (Norman Connors) 5:26
  Arranged by Hubert Eaves and Reggie Lucas
  Electric Guitar Solo – Ray Gomez

Side two

1. "Last Tango in Paris" (Gato Barbieri) – 6:43
  Arranged and conducted by Jerry Peters
2. "For You Everything" (Jerry Peters) – 5:52
  Arranged and conducted by Jerry Peters
  Lead vocals – Eleanore Mills and Phillip Mitchell
3. "Thembi" (Pharoah Sanders) – 8:04
  Arranged by Norman Connors
  Soprano saxophone – Pharoah Sanders

== Charts ==
Chart (1977)	Peak position
US Billboard Top LPs	94
US Top R&B Albums	24
US Jazz Albums	10

=== Singles ===
Year	Single	Chart positions		
Year	Single	US	US R&B	US Dance
1977	"Once I've Been There"	—	16	30

== Personnel ==
Musicians

- Norman Connors – main performer, timpani, drums, percussion
- Charles Veal Jr. – concertmaster
- Myrna Mathews, and Julia, Maxine and Orrin Waters – backing vocals
- Lee Ritenour – acoustic and electric guitar
- Reggie Lucas – electric guitar
- Hubert Eaves and Jerry Peters – acoustic and electric piano, clavinet
- Ian Underwood – synthesizer
- Gary Bartz – alto saxophone
- Fred Jackson – bass and alto flute, alto saxophone, clarinet
- Ernie Watts – bass and alto flute, tenor saxophone
- Bill Green – Bass, alto and piccolo flute, tenor saxophone, clarinet
- Oscar Brashear, Chuck Findley, Gene Goe, and Gary Grant – trumpet
- George Bohannon, Dick Hyde, and Charlie Loper – trombone
- Maurice Spears – bass trombone
- Sidney Muldrow and Marnie Robinson – French horn
- Jerry Peters – harpsichord
- Willie Weeks – bass
- Victor Feldman – percussion, bells, vibraphone
- Kenneth Nash – congas, percussion, Paiste cymbal, gong
- Bobbye Hall – congas and bongos

Production

- Jerry Schoenbaum – executive producer
- Skip Drinkwater – producer
- John Mills and Don Murray – audio engineers
- George Belle and Linda Tyler – engineers assistants
- Bernie Grundman – mastering
- Don Murray and Skip Drinkwater – mixing
