= Angel Eyes (Joe Bonner album) =

Studio album by Joe Bonner
- Released: 1976
- Recorded: October 1974 and January 1976
- Genre: Jazz
- Label: Muse; MR 5114
- Producer: Joe Bonner, Michael Cuscuna

Joe Bonner chronology
The Lifesaver (1975)	Angel Eyes (1976)	Parade (1979)

Angel Eyes is an album by pianist Joe Bonner which was recorded in 1974 and 1975 and released on the Muse label.

Professional ratings
Review scores
Source	Rating
AllMusic	3.5/5 stars

== Track listing ==
All compositions by Joe Bonner except where noted

1. "Angel Eyes" (Matt Dennis) – 6:00
2. "Love Dance" – 4:40
3. "I Do" – 6:08
4. "Variations on The Little Chocolate Boy" – 5:32
5. "Celebration" – 9:27
6. "Interlude" – 3:15

== Personnel ==
- Joe Bonner – piano, bamboo flute
- Billy Harper – tenor saxophone
- Leroy Jenkins – violin
- Juni Booth – bass
- Jimmy Hopps – drums
- Linda Sharrock – vocals
