= Impressions of Copenhagen =

Studio album by Joseph Bonner
- Released: 1981
- Recorded: 1981
- Studio: Northstar Studios, Boulder, Colorado
- Genre: Jazz
- Length: 43:40
- Label: Theresa TR 114
- Producer: J. Thomas Tilton

Joe Bonner chronology
Parade (1978)	Impressions of Copenhagen (1981)	Suburban Fantasies (1983)

Impressions of Copenhagen is an album by pianist Joseph Bonner recorded in 1981 and released on the Theresa label.

== Reception ==
Professional ratings
Review scores
Source	Rating
AllMusic	4.5/5 stars

In his review for AllMusic, Scott Yanow observed "Bonner is an underrated talent, and this is one of his finest recordings".

== Track listing ==
All compositions by Joseph Bonner except as indicated

1. "Impressions of Copenhagen/R.V." - 6:43
2. "The North Star" - 6:15
3. "I'll Say No This Time" - 6:42
4. "Quiet Dawn"" (Cal Massey) - 10:43
5. "Why Am I Here?" - 7:57
6. "Lush Life" (Billy Strayhorn) - 5:35 Bonus track on CD reissue

== Personnel ==
- Joe Bonner - piano, chimes
- Eddie Shu - trumpet
- Holly Hofmann - flute
- Carol Michalowski, Peggy Sullivan - violin
- Carol Garrett - viola
- Beverly Woolery - cello
- Paul Warburton - bass
- J. Thomas Tilton - drums
