= When I Find You Love =

Studio album by Jean Carn
- Released: October 1979
- Studio: Sigma Sound, Philadelphia, Pennsylvania
- Label: Philadelphia International
- Producer: Dexter Wansel, Jerry Butler, Eddie Levert

Jean Carn chronology
| Happy to Be with You (1978) | When I Find You Love (1979) | Sweet and Wonderful (1981) |

When I Find You Love is the third studio album by singer Jean Carn, released in 1979 on the Philadelphia International label.

== Reception ==
Professional ratings
Review scores
| Source | Rating |
|---|---|
| AllMusic | 4/5 stars |

Andrew Hamilton of AllMusic gave special recognition to the production talents of Dexter Wansel, Jack Faith, and the duo of Jerry Butler and John Usry, stating their tracks "...scored on many different levels. "My Love Don't Come Easy," with its come-hither groove, was a mid-charting R&B favorite. "What's on Your Mind," "Give It Up," and particularly "Was That All It Was" became dance club hits."

While lauded by Billboard for its "gently clipped disco shuffle", lead single "My Love Don't Come Easy" peaked at No. 43 on the R&B chart and did not cross over to the dance charts. A trio of second singles including standout "Was That All It Was" peaked at No. 22 on the dance charts.

== Track listing ==
Side One
| No. | Title | Writer(s) | Length |
|---|---|---|---|
| 1. | "When I Find You Love" | Jerry Butler, John Usry, Linda Conlon | 5:11 |
| 2. | "Intro / My Love Don't Come Easy" | Dennis Williams, Eddie Levert, Mike Jackson | 5:11 |
| 3. | "Start The Fire" | Phillip Pugh | 3:58 |
| 4. | "All I Really Need Is You" | Janice Gugliuzza | 3:45 |

Side Two
| No. | Title | Writer(s) | Length |
|---|---|---|---|
| 1. | "Lonely Girl In A Cold Cold World" | Cary Gilbert, Cynthia Biggs, Ted Wortham | 4:22 |
| 2. | "What's On Your Mind" | Dexter Wansel | 4:11 |
| 3. | "Give It Up" | D. Wansel | 4:06 |
| 4. | "Was That All It Was" | J. Butler, J. Usry, L. Conlon | 3:58 |

== Personnel ==
- Backing Vocals – Barbara Ingram, Carla Benson, Evette Benton, Jean Carn, Terri Wells
- Bass – Charles Collins, Jimmy Williams, Steve Green
- Design – Ed Lee, Phyllis H.B.
- Drums – Pete Cliff Rudd, David Williams, Keith Benson, Quinton Joseph
- Engineer – Dirk Devlin, Jeffrey Stewart, Jim Gallagher, Peter Humphreys
- Assistant Engineer – Bill Dorman, Bruce Bluestein, Darryl Rogers, Frank Luria, Michael Tarsia, Vincent Warsavage
- Executive Producer – Dexter Wansel
- Guitar – Darnell Jordon, Dennis Harris, James Herb Smith, Roland Chambers, T.J. Tindall
- Keyboards – Cotton Kent, Dennis Williams, Dexter Wansel, John L. Usry Jr., Theodore Wortham
- Keyboards, Trumpet – Phillip Pugh
- Percussion – David Cruse, Dexter Wansel, Ricky Hicks
- Photography By – Ronald G. Harris
- Strings, Horns – Don Renaldo
- Synthesizer – Dexter Wansel
- Tenor Saxophone – Bob Malach
- Vibraphone – Ed Shea

== Charts ==
=== Albums ===
| Chart (1979) | Peak position |
|---|---|
| US Billboard Soul LPs | 42 |
| US Jazz LPs | 28 |

=== Singles ===
| Year | Single | | |
| Year | Single | US R&B | US Dan |
|---|---|---|---|
| 1979 | "My Love Don't Come Easy" | 43 | — |
| 1980 | "Was That All It Was / What's on Your Mind / Give It Up" | — | 22 |
