= Live at the East =

Live album by Pharoah Sanders
- Released: October 1972
- Recorded: 1971
- Venue: The East, New York City
- Genre: Avant-garde jazz; drone
- Length: 43:07
- Label: Impulse! AS-9227
- Producer: Lee Young

Pharoah Sanders chronology
Black Unity (1971)	Live at the East (1972)	Wisdom Through Music (1973)

Live at the East is a live album by American saxophonist and composer Pharoah Sanders released on the Impulse! label.

== Reception ==
Professional ratings
Review scores
Source	Rating
AllMusic	4.5/5 stars

In the AllMusic review by Scott Yanow, he stated: "this live record gives one a good example of how the passionate tenor sounded in clubs during the early '70s... Sanders is heard in top form."

Writing for The Vinyl Press, Bill Hart commented: "The line up on this album is stellar... Sanders had already developed his signature sound- multiphonic, overblown, but never veering out of control, straddling a fine line between the intense and the serene... This is not the most popular Pharoah Sanders album, nor is it necessarily his best.... there are moments of brilliant playing here, and a killer band. This is a cheap entry into first generation spiritual jazz on a label that was one of the wellsprings for the movement."

In an article for Frieze, Harmony Holiday called "Healing Song" "Pharoah's jazz funeral for John Coltrane", and wrote: "Coltrane's spirit re-enters the earth plane through Pharoah and they have a conversation in brushes, whispers and a percussive bellow. Joe Bonner's accompaniment on piano stands out, responding to Coltrane's haunting presence with delight and meditative frenzy. This is a piece of music that heals and absolves and discloses the urgency of that reconciliation, the triumph of the heart that call and response between worlds is in Black musical tradition... This song heals by teaching us how to stand up and dance among ghosts, how to transition from haunted to empowered by simply deciding to raise the dead and let them speak, celebrating their lives through ours."

== Track listing ==
All compositions by Pharoah Sanders except as indicated

1. "Healing Song" (Joe Bonner, Pharoah Sanders) - 21:43
2. "Memories of J. W. Coltrane" - 12:51
3. "Lumkili" - 8:33

== Personnel ==
- Pharoah Sanders - tenor saxophone
- Marvin Peterson - trumpet
- Carlos Garnett - flute, voice
- Harold Vick - tenor saxophone, voice
- Joe Bonner - piano, harmonium
- Stanley Clarke, Cecil McBee - bass
- Norman Connors, Billy Hart - drums
- Lawrence Killian - congas, balafon
