= Jean Carn (album) =

Studio album by Jean Carn
- Released: 1976
- Recorded: 1976
- Studio: Sigma Sound, Philadelphia, Pennsylvania
- Genre: Philadelphia soul, disco, soul
- Label: Philadelphia International
- Producer: Gamble & Huff, Dexter Wansel, John Whitehead, Gene McFadden, Victor Carstarphen

Jean Carn chronology
Jean Carn (1976)	Happy to Be with You (1978)

Jean Carn is the self-titled debut album by American singer Jean Carn, released in 1976 on the Philadelphia International label.

== Reception and singles ==
Professional ratings
Review scores
Source	Rating
AllMusic	3/5 stars

Ed Hogan of AllMusic stated that "Jean Carn's self-titled debut for Gamble & Huff's Philadelphia International Records could be subtitled "Philly soul at its best."

Two singles were released from the album. The lead-off track, "Free Love", peaked at No. 23 on the Billboard Soul Singles chart in April 1977. The second single, "If You Wanna Go Back", failed to chart. The two songs, along with the track "You Got a Problem", had received enough combined play in dance clubs to peak together at No. 18 on the National Disco Action chart in February 1977.

== Track listing ==
Side one
No.	Title	Writer(s)	Length
1.	"Free Love"	Kenneth Gamble, Leon Huff	4:07
2.	"No Laughing Matter"	K. Gamble, L. Huff	4:52
3.	"I'm In Love Once Again"	Dexter Wansel	5:56
4.	"Don't You Know Love When You See It"	L. Huff, Gene McFadden, John Whitehead, Theodore Life	5:22

Side two
No.	Title	Writer(s)	Length
5.	"Where Did You Ever Go"	D. Wansel	5:00
6.	"You Are All I Need"	D. Wansel	5:31
7.	"If You Wanna Go Back"	K. Gamble, L. Huff	3:25
8.	"You Got a Problem"	Vinnie Barrett, Von Gray	3:21
9.	"Time Waits for No One"	J. Whitehead, G. McFadden, Victor Carstarphen	4:15

== Charts ==
Chart (1976)	Peak position
US Billboard Top LPs	122
US Billboard Soul LPs	46
US Jazz LPs	26

=== Singles ===
Year	Single	Chart positions	
Year	Single	US Soul	US Dance
1977	"Free Love"	23	18
1977	"You Got A Problem"	—	18
1977	"If You Wanna Go Back"	—	18
