= Izipho Zam (My Gifts) =

Studio album by Pharoah Sanders
- Released: 1973
- Recorded: January 14, 1969
- Studio: TownSound, Englewood, NJ
- Genre: Jazz
- Length: 50:23
- Label: Strata-East SES-19733
- Producer: Clifford Jordan

Pharoah Sanders chronology
Wisdom Through Music (1973)	Izipho Zam (My Gifts) (1973)	Village of the Pharoahs (1973)

Izipho Zam (My Gifts) is the third album led by American saxophonist Pharoah Sanders. The album was recorded in 1969 but not released on the Strata-East label until 1973. It features Sanders with a large ensemble.

== Reception ==
Professional ratings
Review scores
Source	Rating
AllMusic	4/5 stars
DownBeat	3.5/5 stars
The Penguin Guide to Jazz	3.5/4 stars

In his review for AllMusic, Thom Jurek wrote that "Izipho Zam is a wonderful recording, full of the depth of vision and heartfelt soul that has informed every recording of Sanders since," and called it "an exhilarating, indispensable out jazz experience". Marcus J. Moore, writing for The New York Times, included the album in his list of "15 Essential Black Liberation Jazz Tracks" and wrote that the title track is "a sprawling 28-minute collage of West African percussion, meditative chants and Mr. Sanders's screeching saxophone. Around the 15-minute mark, the arrangement settles into a hypnotic drum break that still sounds incredibly fresh and modern, 47 years after its release."

Mark Jones of UK Vibe wrote that Izipho Zam "brings together a stellar group of musicians" for "a sonic exploration featuring three compositions by Pharoah Sanders spread over 50 minutes with a free-flowing avant-garde perspective," and called the album "a tour de force... which epitomises the ensemble's collective spirit and understanding for the overall message that Pharaoh Sanders was wishing to convey." Chris May included the album in his list "An introduction to Strata-East in 10 records", calling it "a transitional album, between the unrelenting ferocity of Sanders's work with John Coltrane and the more blissed-out albums he went to make with [Lonnie Liston] Smith, [Leon] Thomas and Alice Coltrane." Andy Thomas, writing for the Red Bull Music Academy, included the album in his article "A Guide to Strata-East", declaring that "The spiritual intensity of Izipho Zam almost lifts you off your feet," and calling the title track "one of Sanders' deepest journeys to the east".

== Track listing ==
All compositions by Pharoah Sanders

1. "Prince of Peace" – 8:44
2. "Balance" – 12:15
3. "Izipho Zam" – 28:50

== Personnel ==
- Pharoah Sanders – tenor saxophone, flute, percussion, vocals
- Howard Johnson – tuba
- Sonny Fortune – alto saxophone, flute
- Lonnie Liston Smith – piano
- Sonny Sharrock – guitar
- Sirone (Norris Jones), Cecil McBee – bass
- Billy Hart – drums
- Chief Bey – African drums
- Nat Bettis, Tony Wiles – percussion
- Leon Thomas – percussion, vocals
