= Closer than Close (Jean Carn album) =

Closer Than Close

Studio album by Jean Carn
- Released: 1986
- Recorded: 1986
- Genres: Philadelphia soul, R&B, soul
- Label: Omni Records

Jean Carn chronology
Trust Me (1982)	Closer Than Close (1986)	You're a Part of Me (1988)

Closer Than Close is the sixth studio album by American singer Jean Carn, released in 1986 on Omni Records. This album peaked at No. 9 on the US Billboard Top R&B Albums chart.

== Critical reception ==
Professional ratings
Review scores
Source	Rating
Allmusic	4/5 stars

Jonathan Takiff of the Philadelphia Inquirer declared, "Carne owns one of the most pliant, expressive voices in soul-land, rivalling those of Patti LaBelle and Anita Baker for shivers-up-the-spine dramatic effect. And this time out, she's very well matched to grown-up ballad music and arrangements in the Al Jarreau crossover style. With (Grover) Washington adding some inspired sax work, "Closer Than Close" hits home from first track to last."

== Tracklisting ==
No.	Title	Length
1.	"Closer Than Close"	5:53
2.	"Flame Of Love"	3:58
3.	"Break Up To Make Up"	4:04
4.	"Lucky Charm"	4:56
5.	"Everything Must Change"	5:51
6.	"Anything For Money"	5:15
7.	"Candy Love"	4:41
8.	"It Must Be Love"	5:55
9.	"Sexy Eyes"	4:06
