= Invitation (Norman Connors album) =

Studio album by Norman Connors
- Released: 1979
- Recorded: 1979
- Genre: Soul; jazz; jazz fusion
- Label: Arista
- Producer: Norman Connors

Norman Connors chronology
This Is Your Life (1977)	Invitation (1979)	Take It to the Limit (1980)

Singles from Invitation
- 1. "Your Love" Released: 1979; 2. "Handle Me Gently" Released: 1979

Professional ratings
Review scores
Source	Rating
AllMusic	2/5 stars

Invitation is an album by Philadelphia, Pennsylvania jazz drummer Norman Connors, released in 1979. The album charted at number 137 on the Billboard top albums chart and number 34 on the Billboard soul albums chart.

== Track listing ==
1. Your Love – 5:06
2. Handle Me Gently – 3:47
3. Be There in the Morning – 4:15
4. Invitation – 4:06
5. Together – 3:14
6. Disco Land – 4:34
7. I Have a Dream – 6:18
8. Beijo Partido – 6:01
9. Kingston – 4:24

== Charts ==
Chart (1979)	Peak position
US Billboard 200	137
US Top R&B/Hip-Hop Albums (Billboard)	34
