= Village of the Pharoahs =

Studio album by Pharoah Sanders
- Released: November 1973
- Recorded: December 8, 1971, November 22, 1972 and September 14, 1973
- Genre: Jazz
- Length: 38:45
- Label: Impulse!
- Producer: Ed Michel

Pharoah Sanders chronology
Izipho Zam (My Gifts) (1973)	Village of the Pharoahs (1973)	Love in Us All (1973)

Village of the Pharoahs is the eighth album by American saxophonist and composer Pharoah Sanders, released in 1973 on the Impulse! label.

In 2011, Impulse! reissued the album, along with Wisdom Through Music, as part of a compilation titled Village of the Pharoahs/Wisdom Through Music.

== Reception ==
Professional ratings
Review scores
Source	Rating
AllMusic	2.5/5 stars
The Encyclopedia of Popular Music	3/5 stars

The AllMusic review by Scott Yanow stated that "there are many more significant Pharoah Sanders records than this one."

Writing for PopMatters, Sean Murphy commented: "The results are impressive and if they sound a bit dated, it's worth asking how this music stacks up with what is being made today. In this writer's opinion, it holds up quite nicely indeed... This is the work of a confident explorer willing to go anywhere and do anything, and a cursory glance at any of Sanders' unsmiling album covers from this period makes the conditions clear: strap in and come along for the ride because once we start we aren't slowing down... Village of The Pharoahs is a time machine that involves neither physics nor hot tubs... a more than solid outing from Sanders in his prime is nothing to shake a sax at."

== Track listing ==
All compositions by Pharoah Sanders

No.	Title	Recording date and studio	Length
1.	"Village of the Pharoahs Part 1"	September 14, 1973, Wally Heider Sound Studios	7:15
2.	"Village of the Pharoahs Part 2"	September 14, 1973, Wally Heider Sound Studios	5:00
3.	"Village of the Pharoahs Part 3"	September 14, 1973, Wally Heider Sound Studios	4:50
4.	"Myth"	September 14, 1973, Wally Heider Sound Studios	1:44
5.	"Mansion Worlds"	December 8, 1971, Van Gelder Studio	9:11
6.	"Memories of Lee Morgan"	November 22, 1972, A&R Recording Studios	5:34
7.	"Went Like It Came"	September 14, 1973, Wally Heider Sound Studios	5:11

== Personnel ==
- Pharoah Sanders – tenor saxophone, soprano saxophone, percussion, vocals, bells
- Joe Bonner – piano, shakuhachi, flute, percussion, vocals
- Stanley Clarke (track 5), Calvin Hill (tracks 1–4 & 7), Cecil McBee (track 5) – bass
- Norman Connors – drums (track 5)
- Kylo Kylo – tambura, percussion (tracks 1–3 & 7)
- Lawrence Killian – conga, percussion, vocals (tracks 1–5 & 7)
- Jimmy Hopps – drums, percussion, vocals (tracks 1–3 & 7)
- Kenneth Nash – sakara, murdunom, percussion, whistles (track 1–4 & 7)
- Sedatrius Brown – vocals (track 1–4 & 7)
