= Wisdom Through Music =

Studio album by Pharoah Sanders
- Released: 1973
- Recorded: 1972
- Studio: A&R, New York City; The Village Recorder, Los Angeles, California
- Genre: Free jazz
- Length: 30:58
- Label: Impulse! AS-9233
- Producer: Lee Young

Pharoah Sanders chronology
Live at the East (1971)	Wisdom Through Music (1973)	Izipho Zam (My Gifts) (1973)

Wisdom Through Music is an album by saxophonist Pharoah Sanders. It was recorded in New York City and Los Angeles, California, and was released in 1973 by Impulse! Records. On the album, Sanders is joined by flutist James Branch, pianist Joe Bonner, bassist Cecil McBee, drummer Norman Connors, and percussionists Badal Roy, James Mtume, and Lawrence Killian. The recording was produced by drummer Lee Young, the younger brother of saxophonist Lester Young.

In 2011, Impulse! reissued the album, along with Village of the Pharoahs, as part of a compilation titled Village of the Pharoahs/Wisdom Through Music.

== Reception ==
In a review for AllMusic, Thom Jurek praised the sense of jubilation on the album, noting "High Life"'s "roiling, celebratory drumming and singing," "Love Is Everywhere"'s "rawness and soulfulness" that "simply burst from the musical frame with celebration," and the "orgy of celebration" heard in "Selflessness."

Tim Niland of All About Jazz wrote that "percussion and strong beats keep the music from flying off into the cosmos," but noted that the album "does seem a little dated and time-locked at times, with bells and chanting recalling the 1970's in all its hazy glory." AAJ's Chris May called the music "sublime," but pointed out the "rather muddy sound, one that does the vocals... no favors."

Writing for PopMatters, Sean Murphy commented: "Wisdom Through Music would have done well with more wisdom and less shenanigans. The actual music is quite satisfactory, but all of the tracks are irredeemably soiled by the insufferable chanting and screeching." He did, however, remark that "Wisdom Through Music" and "The Golden Lamp" "redeem the proceedings..., both exhibiting restraint while expressing some original and attractive melodies."

A writer for Cosmic Jazz stated that the album "features some fine music," and noted that "High Life" "really does emulate the high life style with an stellar band."

== Track listing ==
1. "High Life" (Pharoah Sanders) – 4:20
2. "Love Is Everywhere" (Pharoah Sanders) – 5:23
3. "Wisdom Through Music" (Pharoah Sanders) – 5:40
4. "The Golden Lamp" (Joe Bonner) – 4:40
5. "Selflessness" (Pharoah Sanders) – 10:55

== Personnel ==
- Pharoah Sanders – tenor saxophone, soprano saxophone, flute
- James Branch – flute
- Joe Bonner – piano
- Cecil McBee – bass
- Norman Connors – drums
- Badal Roy – percussion
- James Mtume – percussion
- Lawrence Killian – percussion
