= Joe Bonner =

American jazz musician (1948–2014)

Joe Bonner (April 20, 1948 – November 20, 2014) was an American jazz pianist. Influenced by McCoy Tyner and Art Tatum, he specialized in the hard bop and modal jazz styles.

== Biography ==
Bonner was born in Rocky Mount, North Carolina and studied at Virginia State College, but indicated that he learned more about music from musicians he worked with. In the 1970s, he played with Roy Haynes, Freddie Hubbard, Woody Shaw, and Billy Harper, and Pharoah Sanders (with whom he made eight records), among others. He died of heart disease in Denver at the age of 66.

== Discography ==
=== As leader ===
Year recorded	Title	Label	Personnel/Notes
1974	The Lifesaver	Muse	Solo piano
1975	Triangle	Whynot	Trio, with Clint Houston (bass), Billy Hart (drums)
1974–76	Angel Eyes	Muse	With Billy Harper (tenor sax), Leroy Jenkins (violin), Juini Booth (bass), Jimmy Hopps (drums), Linda Sharrock (vocals)
1979	Parade	SteepleChase	Trio, with Johnny Dyani (bass), Billy Higgins (drums)
1981	Impressions of Copenhagen	Theresa	With Eddie Shu (trumpet), Holly Hofmann (flute), Carol Michalowski and Peggy Sullivan (violin), Carol Garrett (viola), Beverly Woolery (cello), Paul Warburton (bass), J. Thomas Tilton (drums)
1983	Devotion	SteepleChase	Solo piano
1983	Suburban Fantasies	SteepleChase	Duo, with Johnny Dyani (bass)
1985	Suite for Chocolate	SteepleChase	With Khan Jamal (vibraphone), Jesper Lundgaard (bass), Leroy Lowe (drums)
1987	The Lost Melody	SteepleChase	Quartet, with Bob Rockwell (tenor sax), Jesper Lundgaard (bass), Jukkis Uotila (drums)
1988	New Life	SteepleChase	Trio, with Hugo Rasmussen (bass), Aage Tanggaard (drums)
1988?	New Beginnings	Evidence	Most tracks solo piano; some tracks duo, with unknown (bass)
1991	Monkisms	Capri	Solo piano; released around 2001
2001?	Lights Out	Akashic	As The Bonner Party; quartet, with Prasanna Bishop (saxes), Artie Moore-Acoustic (bass), Charles Ayash (drums)
2003	The Art of Jazz Piano	Black Orchard	Solo piano
2013?	Current Events	Cherry Sound	

=== Compilation ===
- Two & One (Steeplechase); with Johnny Dyani (bass)

=== As sideman ===
With Richard Davis

- Epistrophy & Now's the Time (Muse, 1972)

With Billy Harper

- Black Saint (Black Saint, 1975)

With Azar Lawrence

- Bridge into the New Age (Prestige, 1974)

With Barbara Paris

- Where Butterflies Play (Perea Productions, 1992)
- P.S. I Love You (Perea Productions, 12/10/2000)
- Happy Talk (Perea Productions, 2002)

With Pharoah Sanders

- Black Unity (Impulse!, 1971)
- Live at the East (Impulse!, 1972)
- Village of the Pharoahs (Impulse!, 1973)
- Elevation (Impulse!, 1973)
- Love in Us All (Impulse!, 1972–73)
- Wisdom Through Music (Impulse!, 1973)
- Journey to the One (Theresa, 1980)
- Rejoice (Theresa, 1981)

With Woody Shaw

- Love Dance (Muse, 1975)

With Harold Vick

- Don't Look Back (Strata-East, 1974)

With The Visitors

- Motherland (Muse, 1975)

With Stephanie Hancock

- This Happy Madness (DaJazz, 2001)
