= The Lifesaver =

Studio album by Joe Bonner
- Released: 1975
- Recorded: November 1974
- Studio: Blue Rock Studio, NYC
- Genre: Jazz
- Label: Muse; MR 5065
- Producer: Joe Fields

Joe Bonner chronology
Triangle (1974)	The Lifesaver (1975)	Angel Eyes (1975)

The Lifesaver is an album by pianist Joe Bonner which was recorded in 1974 and released on the Muse label.

== Reception ==
Professional ratings
Review scores
Source	Rating
AllMusic	4/5 stars

The AllMusic review by Scott Yanow stated "This solo piano date is still one of Bonner's best. The influence of McCoy Tyner is strong but Bonner's six originals give the set an impressive amount of diversity and even at the relatively young age of 26, Joe Bonner had a lot to say. It is surprising that he has not become very well-known".

== Track listing ==
All compositions by Joe Bonner

1. "Bonner's Bounce" – 6:00
2. "Tatoo" – 4:40
3. "Little Chocolate Boy" – 6:08
4. "The Lifesaver" – 5:32
5. "Native Son" – 9:27
6. "The Observer" – 3:15

== Personnel ==
- Joe Bonner – piano
