= Life preserver =

Life preserver or life-preserver may refer to:

- Personal flotation device
- Lifebuoy, a ring-shaped flotation device
- Life preserver, a kind of club
