= James "Plunky" Branch =

American jazz musician

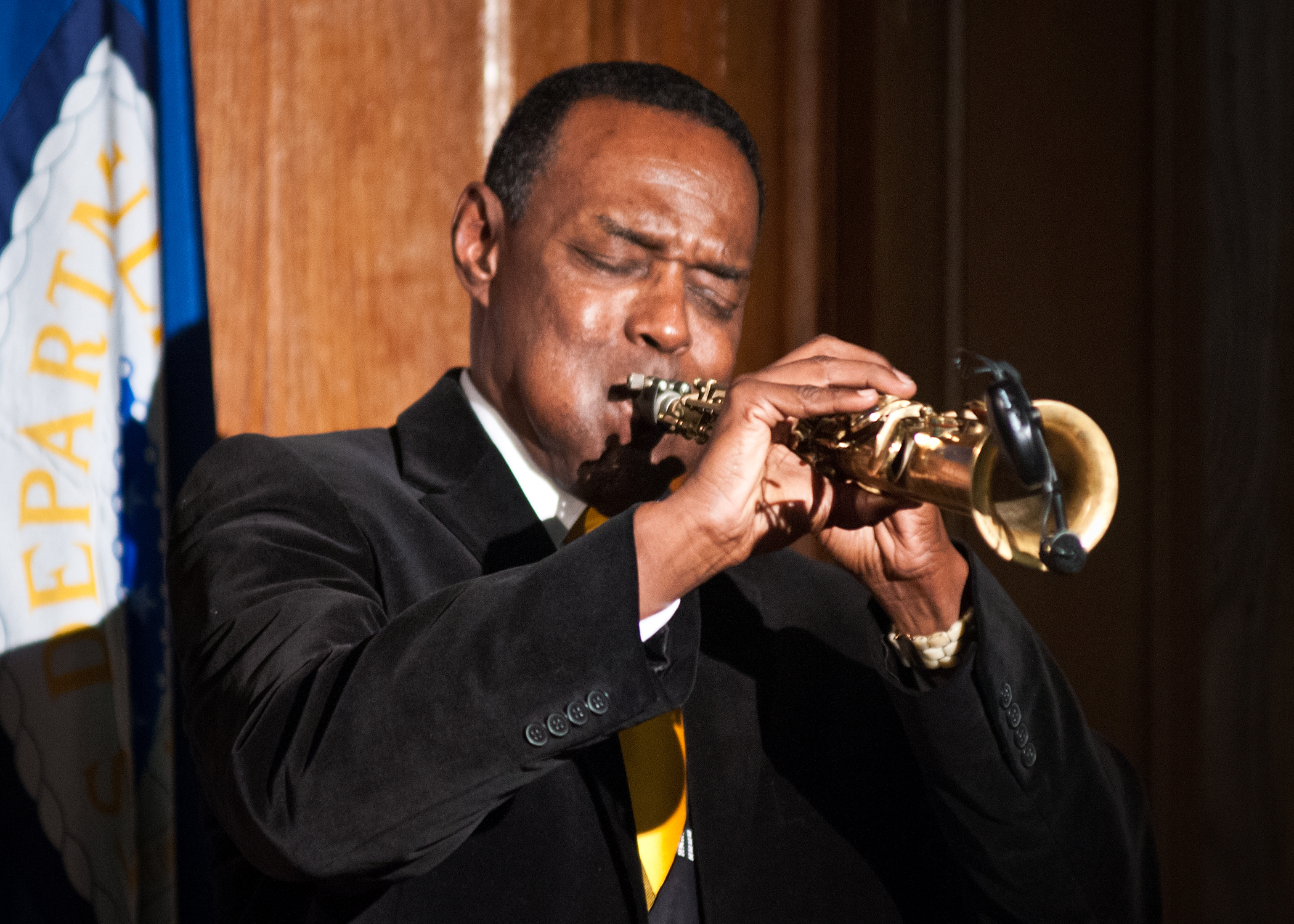
Branch performing in 2012

James "Plunky" Branch is an American jazz saxophonist, songwriter, and music and film producer. He was born on July 20,1947. He founded the band Plunky & Oneness, which began as Juju in 1971 and was renamed twice (Oneness of Juju, Plunky & the Oneness of Juju) before it was given its current name in 1988. Branch is the president and founder of the independent record label N.A.M.E. Brand Records, through which he has released 25 albums. He has worked as a studio musician for The Cosby Show and has appeared on several avant-garde jazz albums. He has been Director of the Jazz Ensemble at Virginia Union University as well as an instructor of Afro-American Music History at Virginia Commonwealth University.

One of Plunky & Oneness's songs, "Every Way But Loose", is featured on the video game Grand Theft Auto: Vice City Stories, playing on fictional radio station Paradise FM. In 2006 Plunky released the solo album Cold Heat, which featured the single "Drop."

Branch has received two NEA Jazz Fellowships and was appointed to the Governor's Task Force for the Promotion of the Arts in Virginia. In 1999 he was recognized by Richmond Magazine as Musician of the Year for 1999.

== Discography ==
=== As leader ===
- African Rhythms with Oneness of Juju (Black Fire, 1975)
- Space Jungle Luv with Oneness of Juju (Black Fire, 1976)
- Every Way But Loose [AKA Make a Change] with Oneness of Juju (Sutra, 1980)
- Electric Juju Nation / Keep It Moving (N.A.M.E. Brand, 1984)
- Tropical Chill (N.A.M.E. Brand, 1988)
- Move into the Light (N.A.M.E. Brand, 1990)
- One World One Music (N.A.M.E. Brand, 1992)
- Spiritual Sounds Within My Soul (N.A.M.E. Brand, 1993)
- Bush Brothers & Space Rangers with Oneness of Juju (Black Fire, 1996)
- X Marks the Spot with Oneness of Juju (Soulciety, 1996)
- Got to be Phunky (N.A.M.E. Brand, 2001)
- Got to Move Something (N.A.M.E. Brand, 2002)
- Live in Paris with Oneness of Juju (Corner Shop, 2006)
- Cold Heat (N.A.M.E. Brand, 2006)
- Drive It (N.A.M.E. Brand, 2008)

With Juju

- A Message from Mozambique (Strata-East, 1973)
- Chapter Two: Nia (Strata-East, 1974)
- Live at 131 Prince Street (P-Vine, 2019)
- Live at the East 1973 (Black Fire, 2019)
