= Gabrielle Goodman =

American jazz musician

Gabrielle Goodman (born 1964 in Baltimore, Maryland) is an American jazz singer, composer, author, and professor of voice at Berklee College of Music. She began working as a backup vocalist for Roberta Flack while at the Peabody Institute and later sang with Michael Bublé and Chaka Khan, and forged a career as a solo touring and recording artist.

== Early life ==
She was raised in Baltimore in a musical family. Her mother was a classical singer and her father was a jazz trombonist. She attended Peabody preparatory school and briefly Oberlin College. She transferred to the Peabody Institute conservatory, where she studied under the direction of Alice Gerstl Duschak and Gordon Hawkins and graduated in 1990.

== Career ==
Goodman, a protege of Roberta Flack began her international performance career as a backing singer for Flack in the mid-1980s and continued to tour and record with the legend for several years opening for Miles Davis, Ray Charles, the Crusaders and other legends in Japan, Switzerland, Brazil and other prestigious venues all over the world. Goodman's breakthrough as a solo recording artist happened when she appeared on producer Norman Connors 1988 album Passion on Capitol Records.Goodman appears in Norman Connors UNSUNG episode. She was the lead female singer on five songs, including a remake of Minnie Riperton's "Loving You" and "You're My One And Only Love". She later recorded two jazz albums Travelin' Light and Until We Love on the JMT/Verve label with German producer Stefan Winter that feature her with Kevin Eubanks, Christian Mcbride, Gary Bartz, Gary Thomas, and Terri Lyne Carrington.Goodman's gospel influence is apparent in her jazz recordings as she blends genres starting "On A Clear Day" with a rousing gospel introduction that gives way to full swing interpretation as the song continues. It was Gary Thomas who recommended Goodman for the recording contract with JMT/Verve. Her early years of singing in church in Baltimore allowed the singer to blend jazz and gospel. Goodman stated that she and the band: Christian Mcbride, Mulgrew Miller and Terri Lyne Carrington began to play the song between takes of another song and the performance was so strong that the producer Stefan Winter decided to record the song and add it to the "Until We Love"CD. Since then Goodman has recorded and produced three soul jazz CDs respectively entitled "Angel Eyes", "Songs From The Book" and "Spiritual Tapestry" for the Goodness label. She appears with Walter Beasley, Terri Lyne Carrington, David Bunn, Tony Bunn, Jeff Ramsey, Armsted Christian and Patrice Rushen on these recordings. In 2018 Goodman demonstrated her ability to sing and compose in the classical tradition with her self-produced recording Black Portraits. It is the only recording that offers an idea of Goodman's full throated classically trained soprano voice in the traditional sense. The versatile singer followed that recording with "Jazz Life" where she steps back into the jazz tradition as a singer and writer, scatting, scooping and purring as she does on her previous releases. She also plays the piano on the poignant, self-penned "Elgin Avenue", an homage to her childhood home in Baltimore.

As a touring and performing solo artist, she appeared in festivals such as the Montreux, North Sea, and Newport. She co-starred with Dee Dee Bridgewater in Montreal Canada 1998 and toured with Michael Bublé in the show Forever Swing 2001. In 2010, she appeared with the Boston Pops for eleven performances at Boston Symphony Hall as a soloist for Christmas shows under the direction of Keith Lockhart. The singer had previously appeared as a soloist with the Pops under the direction of Charles Floyd in 2001 for Pops Gospel performance that year. She has performed with the Baltimore, Syracuse, and Yamayuri Symphony Orchestras. She has a four-octave vocal range.

She has recorded for JMT, Verve, and Polygram and has written and arranged songs for Chaka Khan and Roberta Flack. She has worked as a professor of voice at Berklee College of Music since 1998.

Goodman has also provided vocals for Patti LaBelle, Nona Hendryx, Jennifer Hudson, Mary J. Blige, Patrice Rushen, Freddie Jackson, Bryan Ferry, and George Duke.

== Discography ==
=== As leader ===
- Travelin' Light (1993)
- Until We Love (1994)
- Angel Eyes (2004)
- Songs from the Book (2011)
- Spiritual Tapestry (2014)
- Black Portraits: (Slavery to Freedom) (2019)
- Jazz Life (2023)

=== As sidewoman ===
- I'll Keep Running (Robert Flack) 2018
- S.O.U.L. (Roberta Flack)
- "Softly With His Song" (Roberta Flack)
- More To Say (Terri Lyne Carrington)
- "Oasis" (Roberta Flack) 1988
- Passion (1988) Norman Connors
- Magic Lady (1991) Lonnie Liston Smith
- "Melba More (1986) It's Been So Long-backing vocals
- It's Too Late (The Strangers) 1983

=== Solo Appearances on Compilation Recordings ===
- Jazz Singing (Verve Jazz Vocal Collection) (1997)
- Verve Next Generation Volume 2

=== As a writer ===
- "You Can Make the Story Right" (Chaka Khan), The Woman I Am (1991)
- "Rap intro to A Prelude to a Kiss" (Roberta Flack), Roberta (1994)

== Publications ==
- Vocal Improvisation: Techniques in Jazz, R&B and Gospel Improvisation (2010)
