= Brandi Wells =

American singer (1955-2003)

- Born: Marguerite J. Pinder; May 13, 1955; Chester, Pennsylvania, U.S.
- Origin: Philadelphia, Pennsylvania, U.S.
- Died: March 24, 2003 (aged 47) Chester, Pennsylvania, U.S.
- Genres: Soul; Funk; R&B; Disco
- Occupations: Singer, songwriter, recording artist and entertainer.
- Years active: 1955–2003
- Labels: Fantasy Records; Omni Records
- Formerly of: Fat Larry's Band; Breeze; Slick

Brandi Wells (May 13, 1955 – March 24, 2003) was an American singer, songwriter, recording artist and entertainer.

Born Marguerite J. Pinder in Chester, Pennsylvania, one of the five daughters of Thomas and Dorothy (née Williams) Pinder, and educated in the Chester Upland School District. She sang with Fat Larry's Band, Breeze, and Slick before starting a solo career. Her debut album, Watch Out, appeared in 1981 on Fantasy Records and reached No. 37 on the US Billboard R&B chart. The title track charted at No. 27 on the US Hot R&B/Hip-Hop Songs chart and No. 16 on the US Hot Dance Club Songs chart. It also peaked at No. 74 in the UK Singles Chart in February 1982. "Watch Out" proved to be her only hit, though she released an album in 1985.

== Marriage ==
Wells married Ronald E. Bannister Jr., the couple had two children together, Nathaniel Brown Walker Pinder, and the late Shameka Pinder. Wells also had four stepchildren: Janay Graham, Janine Graham, Ronald E. Bannister III and Juakira Gordon, and one grandchild.

== Death ==
Brandi Wells was 47 years of age when she died at the Crozer-Chester Medical Center in Chester, Pennsylvania, on March 24, 2003, from breast cancer. She is interred at the Haven Memorial Cemetery in Chester, Pennsylvania.

== Discography ==
- Watch Out (Fantasy Records, 1981)
- 21st Century Fox (Omni Records, 1985)
