= Project Lifesaver =

American non-profit organization

- Formation: 1999; 27 years ago
- Type: 501(c)(3) non-profit organization
- Purpose: Provides care givers and first responders "with a program designed to protect, and when necessary, quickly locate individuals with cognitive disorders who are prone to the life threatening behavior of wandering".
- Headquarters: Port St. Lucie, Florida, U.S.
- Region served: Australia (coming soon), Canada, United States
- Founder CEO: Gene Saunders
- Website: projectlifesaver.org

Project Lifesaver International is a non-profit 501(c)(3) corporation founded in October 1998, by Chief Gene Saunders, in association with, the Chesapeake, Virginia Sheriff's Office. The organization was formed to develop a program for locating missing persons with dementia, epilepsy, Alzheimer's disease, autism, Down syndrome and other disabilities. The program involves attaching a radio transmitter device to the wrist or ankle of persons at-risk of wandering. The battery operated radio transmitter is attached with a wristband and emits an inaudible pulse once per second, in the FCC allocated and licensed 216 MHz frequency range, that can be picked up by a receiver operated by public safety officers. Project Lifesaver utilizes radio frequency tracking technology, which is tested by member agencies before being approved for field use.

As of October 15th, 2025, another milestone was reached with over 5,000 rescues in an average time of less than 30 minutes, normally using only two to three public safety responders.

== See also ==
- Direction finding
