= Al Johnson (musician) =

American R&B singer (1948–2013)

- Born: Alfred Orlando Johnson; February 11, 1948; Newport News, Virginia, US
- Died: October 26, 2013 (aged 65)
- Genres: Soul; R&B
- Occupation: Singer
- Years active: 1966–2013
- Labels: Columbia; Kapp; Clout; Marina
- Formerly of: The Unifics

Alfred Orlando Johnson (February 11, 1948 – October 26, 2013) was an American R&B singer, writer, arranger and producer. He co-wrote the song "We Have Love for You" with Deniece Williams for her 1977 album Songbird.

== Biography ==
Born in Newport News, Virginia, in 1948, Johnson attended Howard University in Washington, DC, and while there, co-founded the soul group, the Unifics. The group, with Johnson as lead singer, scored three hits on the Billboard Hot 100 in 1968 and 1969 for the Kapp Records label. The first, "Court of Love" climbed to #25, but reached #3 on the US Billboard R&B chart. The follow-up, "The Beginning of My End" got to #36 on the Hot 100 and #9 R&B. Two further releases in 1969 reached the R&B chart.

Johnson continued to write songs for other artists throughout the 70s including Sparkle star Lonette McKee, Tata Vega and Deniece Williams. In 1978 he recorded his debut solo album, Peaceful which he co-produced, as well as arranging and co-writing, for a small label, Marina, part-owned by former singer, Lloyd Price.

In 1980, Johnson collaborated with jazz/soul producer Norman Connors for his second solo album, Back For More, on Columbia Records. This came after he had sung on Norman Connors' album, Invitation for Arista Records in 1979, singing the lead track, "Your Love". Back for More peaked at #48 on the Billboard Black Albums chart. The lead single from the album, "I'm Back for More", a duet with Jean Carn, reached #26 on the R&B chart, whilst the follow-up, "I've Got My Second Wind", hit #58, both in 1980. That same year, "Second Wind" was covered in an up-tempo groove by Tata Vega featuring G. C. Cameron on Motown Records.

Around this time, Johnson was writing, arranging and also playing keyboards on recording sessions, including for the Willie Lester-Rodney Brown production team that released several successful disco/soul albums on Prelude in the early 1980s, with acts such as Sharon Redd, Bobby Thurston and Gayle Adams.

In the 1990s, Johnson worked with The Whispers on several albums and, in 1998, released his final solo album My Heart Is an Open Book for independent label, CLOUT Entertainment. Johnson re-formed the Unifics with original group member Tom Fauntleroy, and also toured with a solo gospel show. The group issued a new album, Unifics Return in 2005.

Johnson, aged 65, died on October 26, 2013.

== Discography ==
=== Albums ===
- Peaceful (Marina Records, 1978)
- Back for More (Columbia Records, 1980)
- My Heart Is an Open Book (CLOUT Entertainment, 1998)

=== Singles ===
Year	Title	US R&B
1967	"Bless Your Little Sweet Soul"	—
1967	"Love Waits For No Man"	—
1972	"You Got to Make It for Yourself" (with Angela Coulter)	—
1976	"Skateboard Superman"	—
1980	"You're a Different Lady"	—
1980	"I'm Back for More" (with Jean Carn)	26
1980	"I've Got My Second Wind"	58
"—" denotes releases that did not chart.
