= Norman Connors =

American jazz and R&B drummer (born 1947)

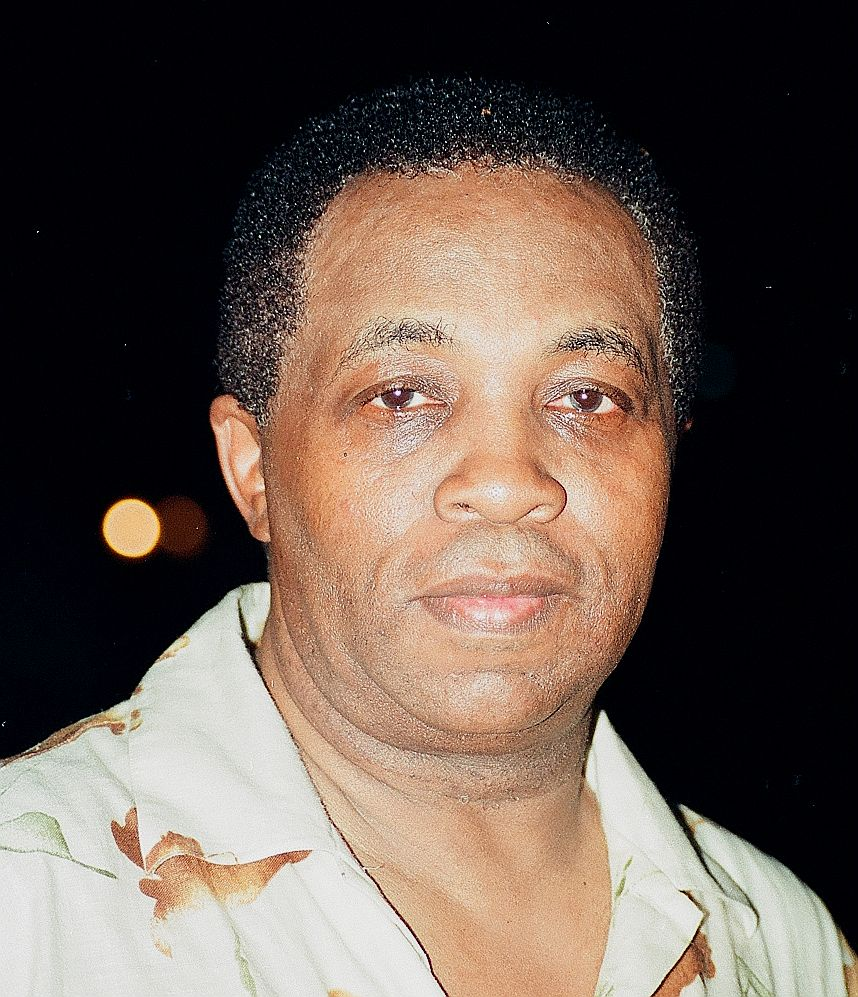
- Connors in 1997

Background information
- Born: Norman Connors; March 1, 1947 (age 79); Philadelphia, Pennsylvania, United States
- Genres: Jazz; jazz fusion; smooth jazz
- Occupations: Musician; composer; arranger; producer
- Instrument: Drums
- Years active: 1967–present
- Labels: Buddah; Arista; Capitol; Motown; Shanachie

Norman Connors (born March 1, 1947) is an American jazz drummer, composer, arranger, and producer who has led a number of influential jazz and R&B groups. He also achieved several big R&B hits of the day, especially with love ballads. He is possibly best known for the 1976 hit, "You Are My Starship" on which lead vocals were sung by Michael Henderson.

== Biography ==
Connors lived in the same Philadelphia neighbourhood as comedian/actor Bill Cosby and had an interest in jazz from a very early age when he began to play drums. Whilst at elementary school, Connors was exposed to jazz extensively and became heavily influenced by the drummer Lex Humphries and the younger brother of bassist and Jazz-Messenger player, Spanky DeBrest. He first met his idol, Miles Davis, aged just 13 in 1960.

He once sat in for Elvin Jones at a John Coltrane performance he attended while in middle school. Connors studied music at Temple University and Juilliard. His first recording was on Archie Shepp's 1967 release, Magic of JuJu. He played with Pharoah Sanders for the next few years until signing in 1972 with jazz label, Cobblestone Records, a division of Buddah Records, and releasing his first record as a bandleader.

Connors began to focus more on R&B material in the mid-1970s after signing with Buddah Records and then becoming the label's A&R manager. He scored several US hits with songs featuring guest vocalists such as Michael Henderson, Jean Carn, and Phyllis Hyman. The most successful of these was "You Are My Starship" (No. 4 R&B, No. 27 Pop), featuring Henderson in 1976, while "Valentine Love", his first chart success, made No. 10 R&B in 1975, with vocals from Henderson and Jean Carne. Dee Dee Bridgewater also performed with him on the jazz album "Love from the Sun". He has also produced recordings for various artists, including collaborators like Jean Carn, Phyllis Hyman, Al Johnson, Norman Brown, and saxophonist Marion Meadows.

Connors switched to the Arista label when Buddah was bought out in 1978 and achieved a crossover to the disco scene in 1980 when he had the hit "Take it to the Limit", which was released on 12" single. The B side, "Black Cow" (an instrumental) was written by Steely Dan's Walter Becker and Donald Fagen.

In 1988 he had a hit on Capitol Records with "I Am Your Melody" (with B-side "Samba for Maria") from his LP Passion which he produced featuring singer Spencer Harrison (1962–1994). Connors also introduced another up and coming singer on the Passion LP, Gabrielle Goodman who sang Minnie Riperton's "Lovin' You", "My One And Only Love", "Private Stock" and duets with Harrison on the LP.

His later work, Star Power, features smooth jazz and urban crossover music.

On October 30, 2022, Connors life was featured on a TV One episode of Unsung.

== Discography ==
=== Studio albums ===
Year	Album	Peak chart positions					Certifications	Record label
Year	Album	US	US R&B	US Jazz	US Cont Jazz	CAN	Certifications	Record label
1972	Dance of Magic	—	—	—	—	—		Cobblestone
1973	Dark of Light	—	—	—	—	—		Cobblestone
1974	Love from the Sun	—	—	—	—	—		Buddah
1974	Slewfoot	—	51	—	—	—		Buddah
1975	Saturday Night Special	150	35	—	—	—		Buddah
1976	You Are My Starship	39	5	—	—	—	RIAA: Gold	Buddah
1977	Romantic Journey	94	24	—	—	—		Buddah
1978	This Is Your Life	68	20	—	—	92		Arista
1979	Invitation	137	34	—	—	—		Arista
1980	Take It to the Limit	145	30	—	—	—		Arista
1981	Mr. C	197	51	—	—	—		Arista
1988	Passion	—	39	—	—	—		Capitol
1993	Remember Who You Are	—	70	—	19	—		MoJazz
1996	Easy Living	—	—	47	—	—		MoJazz
2000	Eternity	—	—	18	13	—		The Right Stuff
2009	Star Power	—	—	13	6	—		Shanachie
"—" denotes a recording that did not chart or was not released in that territory.

=== Compilation albums ===
Year	Album	Peak chart positions		Record label
Year	Album	US	US R&B	Record label
1978	The Best of Norman Connors & Friends	175	44	Buddah
1997	The Encore Collection	—	—	BMG
1998	The Very Best of Norman Connors	—	—	Camden
1999	Melancholy Fire - The Best of Norman Connors	—	—	Razor & Tie
2001	The Best of Norman Connors	—	—	Buddha
2017	Valentine Love - The Buddah/Arista Anthology	—	—	SoulMusic
"—" denotes a recording that did not chart or was not released in that territory.

=== Singles ===
Year	Single	Peak chart positions				Album
Year	Single	US	US R&B	US Dan	CAN	Album
1975	"Valentine Love" (featuring Michael Henderson & Jean Carn)	97	10	—	—	Saturday Night Special
1976	"We Both Need Each Other" (featuring Michael Henderson & Phyllis Hyman)	101	23	—	—	You Are My Starship
1976	"You Are My Starship" (featuring Michael Henderson)	27	4	—	70	You Are My Starship
1977	"Betcha by Golly, Wow" (featuring Phyllis Hyman)	102	29	—	—	You Are My Starship
1977	"Once I've Been There" (featuring Phillip Mitchell)	—	16	30	—	Romantic Journey
1977	"For You Everything" (featuring Phillip Mitchell & Eleanore Mills)	—	—	—	—	Romantic Journey
1978	"This Is Your Life" (featuring Eleanore Mills)	—	31	—	—	This Is Your Life
1978	"Wouldn't You Like to See" (featuring Eleanore Mills)	—	—	—	—	This Is Your Life
1979	"Your Love" (featuring Al Johnson)	—	—	—	—	Invitation
1979	"Handle Me Gently" (featuring Miss Adaritha)	—	—	—	—	Invitation
1980	"Take It to the Limit" (featuring Miss Adaritha)	—	28	—	—	Take It to the Limit
1980	"Melancholy Fire" (featuring Glenn Jones)	—	20	—	—	Take It to the Limit
1981	"She's Gone" (featuring Beau Williams)	—	86	—	—	Mr. C
1988	"I Am Your Melody" (featuring Spencer Harrison)	—	26	—	—	Passion
1988	"You're My One and Only Love" (featuring Gabrielle Goodman)	—	—	—	—	Passion
1988	"Lovin' You" (featuring Gabrielle Goodman)	—	—	—	—	Passion
1993	"Remember Who You Are" (featuring Phyllis Hyman)	—	86	—	—	Remember Who You Are
2000	"Cobra" (featuring Norman Brown)	—	—	—	—	Eternity
2000	"Didn't I (Blow Your Mind This Time)" (featuring Lisa Fischer)	—	—	—	—	Eternity
"—" denotes a recording that did not chart or was not released in that territory.

=== As sideman ===
With Carlos Garnett

- Black Love (Muse, 1974)

With Sam Rivers

- Streams (Impulse!, 1973)
- Hues (Impulse!, 1973)
- Emanation (NoBusiness, 2019) - Volume 1 of the Sam Rivers Archive Series; recorded in 1971

With Pharoah Sanders

- Live at the East (Impulse!, 1972)
- Village of the Pharoahs (Impulse!, 1973)
- Love in Us All (Impulse!, 1972–73)
- Wisdom Through Music (Impulse!, 1973)
- Love Will Find a Way (Arista, 1978)
- Beyond a Dream (Arista Novus, 1981)
