= Jean Carn =

American jazz and pop singer (born 1947)

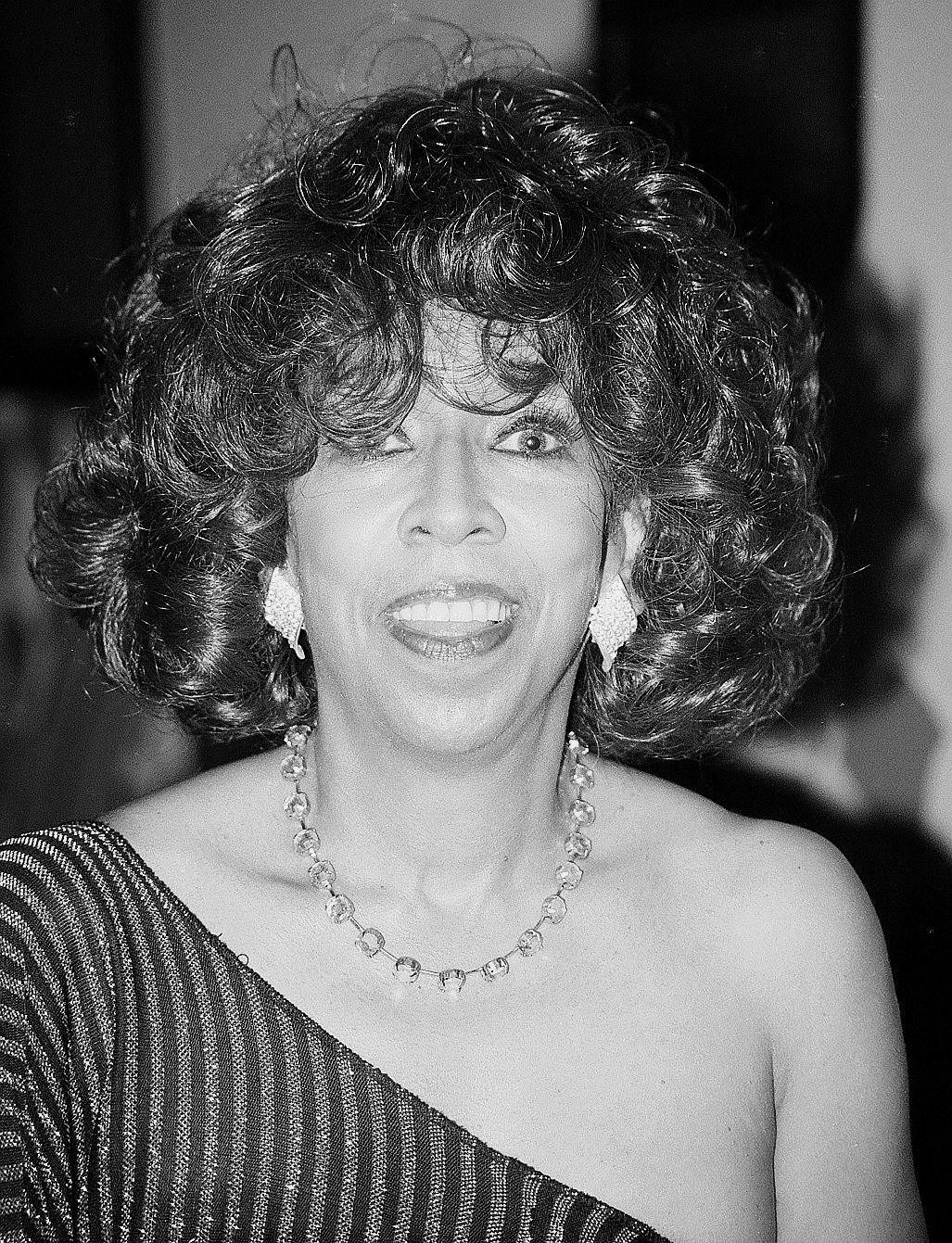
- Carn in 1997

Background information
- Also known as: Jean Carne
- Born: Sarah Jean Perkins; March 15, 1947 (age 79); Columbus, Georgia, U.S.
- Origin: Atlanta, Georgia, U.S.
- Genres: R&B; soul; Philadelphia soul; jazz; disco
- Occupation: Singer
- Instrument: Vocals
- Years active: 1969–present
- Labels: Buddah; Philadelphia International; Motown; Omni/Atlantic; Place One; Expansion

Jean Carn, also spelled Jean Carne (born Sarah Jean Perkins; March 15, 1947) is an American R&B/soul and jazz singer. In mid-career, she added a final e to her name. Carn is a vocalist credited with a five-octave vocal range.

== Biography ==
Carn was born Sarah Jean Perkins in Columbus, Georgia. At the age of four, she became a member of her church choir.

After graduating from Booker T. Washington High School in Atlanta, where she learned to speak fluent Russian, Perkins accepted a scholarship to Morris Brown College. At Morris Brown, she continued to study Russian and performed a wide genre of musical including musical theater and opera. Carn planned on furthering her studies at Juilliard School of Music in New York City when she met and married jazz pianist Doug Carn and became a featured vocalist in his jazz fusion band. The couple based themselves in Los Angeles, California, where Carn appeared on three of his four early albums, Infant Eyes, Spirit of the New Land, and Revelation on Black Jazz/Ovation. The couple later divorced.

In 1976, Carn was signed to Kenneth Gamble and Leon Huff's Philadelphia International Records. She released her debut album Jean Carn in 1976. The debut single "Free Love" went to number 23 R&B. In June 1978, her second album for the label, Happy to Be With You, was released. It included the hit single "Don't Let It Go to Your Head".

Carn's third Philadelphia International album When I Find You Love was issued in 1979. "My Love Don't Come Easy" peaked at number 43 on the R&B chart. The album included the Jerry Butler penned track "Was That All It Was?" which, despite not charting on the R&B charts, was a big disco hit in the UK clubs.

At this time, Carn moved from the Philadelphia International label to the subsidiary TSOP imprint for her 1981 album Sweet and Wonderful. Carn moved to Motown Records in 1982, making her label debut with her only album on the label, Trust Me. The single "If You Don't Know Me By Now," a cover of the Harold Melvin and the Blue Notes hit with backing vocals by The Temptations, went to number 49 on the R&B chart.

By 1986, Carn signed to Omni Records. Closer Than Close, produced by saxophonist Grover Washington Jr. went to number one on the R&B charts. Her 1988 album You're a Part of Me was her only release on Atlantic Records. In 2014, Carn was honored with a Lifetime Achievement Award present by the National R&B Music Society in Philadelphia, Pennsylvania. In 2020, Carn was one of the performers aboard on the Soul Train Cruise.

On October 16, 2022, Carn's life was featured on the documentary TV One series, Unsung.

On April 28, 2025 Carn was inducted into the National R&B Music Society's Atlantic City Walk of Fame at Brighton Park in Atlantic City, NJ. Stuart Bascombe of Black Ivory and producer Dave Wooley were the inductors. The Stylistics, Ray, Goodman & Brown, Blue Magic and the late Phyllis Hyman were also Inducted. Carn is the 11th inductee honored with a plaque into The Atlantic City Walk of Fame.

== Discography ==
=== Studio albums ===
Year	Title	Peak chart positions			Record label
Year	Title	US	US R&B	US Jazz	Record label
1976	Jean Carn	122	46	26	Philadelphia International
1978	Happy to Be with You	—	55	—	Philadelphia International
1979	When I Find You Love	—	42	28	Philadelphia International
1981	Sweet and Wonderful	176	38	—	TSOP
1982	Trust Me	—	37	—	Motown
1986	Closer Than Close	—	9	—	Omni
1988	You're a Part of Me	—	40	—	Atlantic
1995	Carn Sings McCoy	—	—	—	Vammi
1996	Love Lessons	—	—	—	Moja
"—" denotes a recording that did not chart or was not released in that territory.

=== Compilations ===
- The Best of Jean Carn & The Best of The Jones Girls (1998, Recall 2cd)
- Closer Than Close: The Best of Jean Carn (1999, Philadelphia International/The Right Stuff)
- Collaborations (2002, Expansion)
- Don't Let It Go to Your Head: The Anthology (2018, SoulMusic)

=== Singles ===
Year	Single	Peak chart positions				Album
Year	Single	US	US R&B	US Dan	UK	Album
1971	"Peace"	—	—	—	—	Infant Eyes
1975	"Valentine Love" (with Norman Connors & Michael Henderson)	97	10	—	—	Saturday Night Special
1977	"Free Love"	—	23	18	—	Jean Carn
1977	"You Got a Problem"	—	—	18	—	Jean Carn
1977	"If You Wanna Go Back"	—	—	18	—	Jean Carn
1978	"Happy to Be with You"	—	—	—	—	Happy to Be with You
1978	"Don't Let It Go to Your Head"	—	54	—	—	Happy to Be with You
1978	"There's a Shortage of Good Men"	—	—	—	—	Happy to Be with You
1979	"My Love Don't Come Easy"	—	43	—	—	When I Find You Love
1979	"Start the Fire"	—	—	—	—	When I Find You Love
1979	"Was That All It Was"	—	—	22	—	When I Find You Love
1979	"What’s On Your Mind"	—	—	22	—	When I Find You Love
1979	"Give It Up"	—	—	22	—	When I Find You Love
1980	"I'm Back for More" (with Al Johnson)	—	26	—	—	Back for More
1981	"Sweet and Wonderful" (with Glenn Jones)	—	—	—	—	Sweet and Wonderful
1981	"Love Don't Love Nobody (Part 1)"	—	35	—	—	Sweet and Wonderful
1982	"If You Don't Know Me by Now"	—	49	—	—	Trust Me
1982	"Let's Stay Together" (with Bobby Militello)	—	74	—	—	Blow
1986	"Closer Than Close"	—	1	—	—	Closer Than Close
1986	"Flame of Love"	—	21	—	—	Closer Than Close
1987	"Everything Must Change"	—	79	—	—	Closer Than Close
1988	"Heartache"	—	—	—	—	You're a Part of Me
1988	"Ain't No Way"	—	23	—	—	You're a Part of Me
1988	"Let Me Be the One"	—	—	—	95	You're a Part of Me
1996	"Don't Stop Doin' Whatcha Doin'"	—	109	—	—	Love Lessons
1998	"Make Love"	—	—	—	—	Love Lessons
2002	"Somebody Bigger" (with Jeff Majors)	—	111	—	—	Gotta Have Gospel
"—" denotes a recording that did not chart or was not released in that territory.

=== DVD ===
- Jean Carn & Friends: The Sound of Philadelphia: Live in Europe (Expansion, 2005)
- Ladies Night Out—Live (Steppin Muzak, 2007, also available as a CD)
